= List of marine bony fishes of South Africa =

Sublist of the List of marine fishes of South Africa

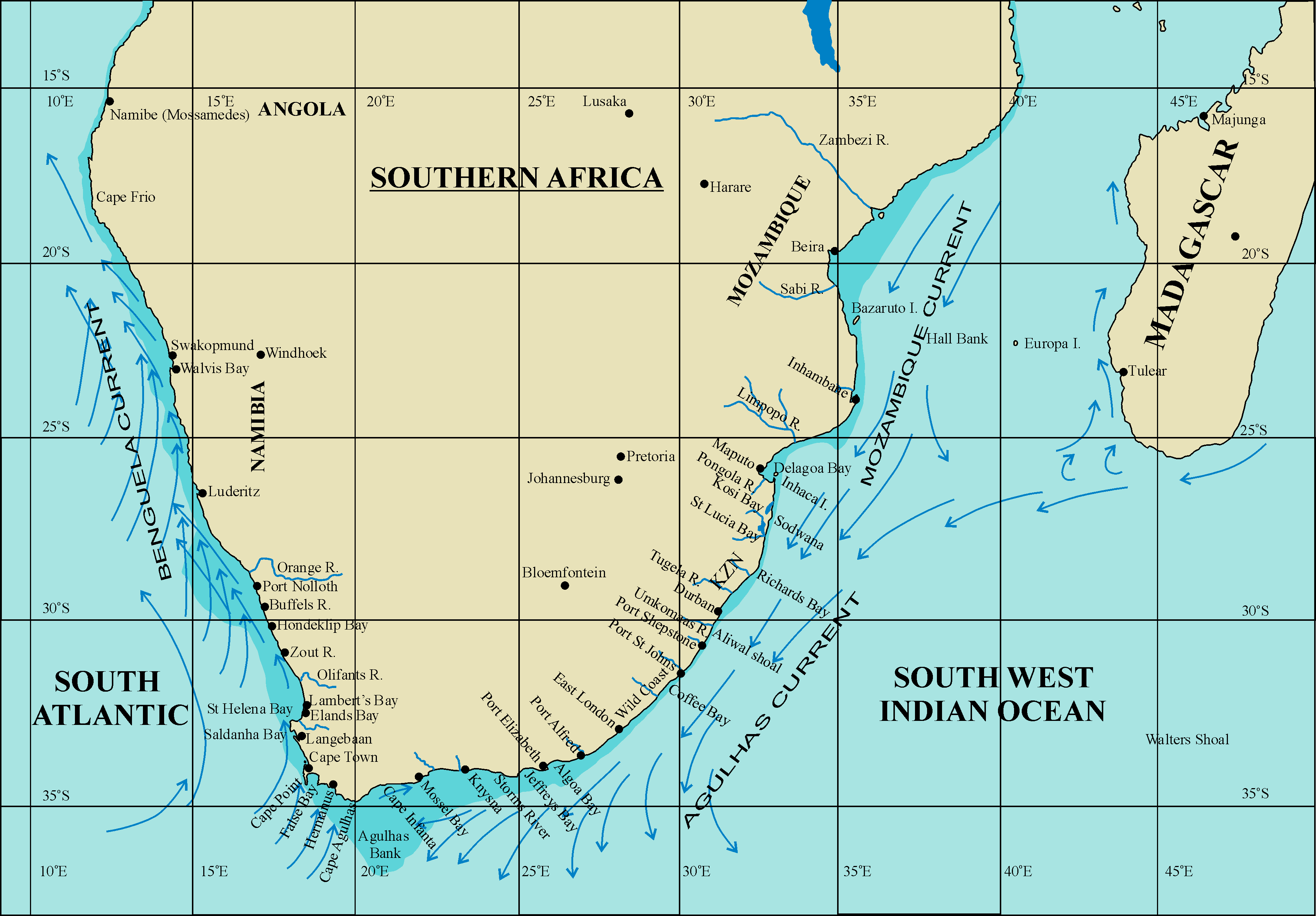
Map of the Southern African coastline showing some of the landmarks referred to in species range statements

This is a sublist of the List of marine fishes of South Africa for bony fishes recorded from the oceans bordering South Africa. This list comprises locally used common names, scientific names with author citation and recorded ranges. Ranges specified may not be the entire known range for the species, but should include the known range within the waters surrounding the Republic of South Africa.

List ordering and taxonomy complies where possible with the current usage in World Register of Marine Species (WoRMS), and may differ from the cited source, as listed citations are primarily for range or existence of records for the region. Sub-taxa within any given taxon are arranged alphabetically as a general rule. Details of each species may be available through the relevant internal links. Synonyms should be listed where relevant.

Osteichthyes (/ˌɒstiːˈɪkθiːz/ ost-ee-IK-theez; from Ancient Greek ὀστέον (ostéon) 'bone' and ἰχθύς (ikhthús) 'fish'), also known as osteichthyans or commonly referred to as the bony fish, is a diverse clade of vertebrate animals that have endoskeletons primarily composed of bone tissue, encompassing both the conventional bony fishes and, in a cladistic sense, all tetrapods, including mammals and reptiles. They can be contrasted with the Chondrichthyes (cartilaginous fish) and the extinct placoderms and acanthodians, which have endoskeletons primarily composed of cartilage. The vast majority of extant fish are members of Osteichthyes, being an extremely diverse and abundant group consisting of 45 orders, over 435 families and 28,000 species. (Full article...)

== Parvphylum Osteichthyes – Bony fishes ==
All entries in this list are included in this infraphylum of Gnathostomata. There are two gigaclasses represented: Actinopterygii and Sarcopterygii.

== Gigaclass Actinopterygii – Ray-finned fishes ==
=== Class Teleostei ===
==== Order Acanthuriformes ====
Family: Acanthuridae – Surgeonfishes and unicornfishes.

- Tailring surgeon, Acanthurus blochii Valenciennes, 1835 (Indo-Pacific south to Durban)
- Pencilled surgeon, Acanthurus dussumieri Valenciennes, 1835 (Port Alfred to Mozambique)(Algoa Bay to western Pacific)
- Powder-blue surgeonfish, Acanthurus leucosternon Bennett, 1832 (Sodwana Bay to Indonesia)
- Bluebanded surgeon, Acanthurus lineatus (Linnaeus, 1758) (Indo-Pacific south to Durban)
- Elongate surgeon, Acanthurus mata (Cuvier, 1829) (Indo-Pacific south to Durban)
- Epaulette surgeon, Acanthurus nigricauda Duncker and Mohr, 1929 (Indo-Pacific south to Durban)
- Brown surgeon, Acanthurus nigrofuscus (Forsskål, 1775) (Indo-Pacific south to Coffee Bay)
- Lieutenant surgeonfish, doubleband surgeonfish, Acanthurus tennentii Günther, 1861 (Western Indian Ocean from Natal to Sri Lanka)
- Chocolate surgeon, Acanthurus thompsoni (Fowler, 1923) (Indo-Pacific south to Sodwana Bay)
- Convict surgeon, Acanthurus triostegus (Linnaeus, 1758) (Indo-Pacific south to Bashee River, with postlarvae as far as Algoa Bay)
- Yellowfin surgeon, Acanthurus xanthopterus Valenciennes, 1835 (Durban to eastern Pacific)
- Twospot bristletooth, Ctenochaetus binotatus Randall, 1955 (Indo-Pacific south to Natal)
- Striped bristletooth, Ctenochaetus striatus (Quoy & Gaimard, 1825) (Indo-Pacific south to Natal)
- Spotted bristletooth, Ctenochaetus strigosus (Bennett, 1828) (Indo-Pacific south to Natal)
- Whitemargin unicornfish, Naso annulatus (Quoy & Gaimard, 1825)
- Humpback unicorn, Naso brachycentron (Valenciennes, 1835) (Indo-Pacific south to Natal)
- Spotted unicorn, Naso brevirostris (Valenciennes, 1835) (Indo-Pacific south to Durban, with juveniles drifting to Algoa Bay)
- Orange-spine unicorn, Naso lituratus (Forster, 1801) (Indo-Pacific south to Durban)
- Humpnose unicorn, Naso tuberosus Lacepède 1802 (Natal to Gilbert Islands)
- Bluespine unicornfish, Naso unicornis (Forsskål, 1775) (Indo-Pacific south to Natal)
- Bignose unicorn, Naso vlamingii (Valenciennes, 1835) (Indo-Pacific south to Natal)
- Palette surgeon, Paracanthurus hepatus (Natal to central Pacific)
- Spotted tang, Zebrasoma gemmatum (Valenciennes, 1835) (Mauritius, Madagascar, Sodwana Bay and 3 specimens from Durban)
- Twotone tang, Zebrasoma scopas (Cuvier, 1829) (Indo-Pacific south to Natal)
- Sailfin tang, Zebrasoma velifer (Bloch, 1797) (Indo-Pacific south to Natal)

Family: Antigoniidae – Boarfishes

- Boarfish, Antigonia rubescens (Günther, 1860) (Indo-West Pacific from Natal to Japan)

Family: Chaetodontidae – Butterflyfishes

- Threadfin butterflyfish, Chaetodon auriga Forsskål, 1775 (Tropical Ind-Pacific south to Mossel Bay)
- Brownburnie, Chaetodon blackburnii Desjardins, 1836 (Tropical Indo-Pacific south to Bashee River)
- Blackedged butterflyfish, Chaetodon dolosus Ahl, 1923 (East African coast south to Xora River)
- Gorgeous gussie or peppered butterflyfish, Chaetodon guttatissimus Bennett, 1833 (Durban to Red Sea)
- Whitespotted butterflyfish or sunburst butterflyfish, Chaetodon kleinii Bloch, 1790 (Red sea and Indian Ocean south to Coffee Bay)
- Lined butterflyfish, Chaetodon lineolatus Quoy and gaimard, 1831 (Red sea and Indian Ocean south to Durban)
- Raccoon butterflyfish or halfmoon butterflyfish, Chaetodon lunula (Lacepède, 1802) (South Africa to Hawaii, Japan and Australia. South to East London)
- Pearly butterflyfish or Seychelles butterflyfish, Chaetodon madagaskariensis Ahl, 1923 (Indian Ocean south to Port Elizabeth)
- Doublesash butterflyfish, Chaetodon marleyi Regan, 1921 (Lamberts Bay to Maputo. Endemic)
- Blackback butterflyfish, Chaetodon melannotus Bloch and Schneider, 1801 (Red Sea south to Durban)
- Maypole butterflyfish or scrawled butterflyfish, Chaetodon meyeri Bloch & Schneider, 1801 (Indo-Pacific south to Durban)
- Rightangle butterflyfish or chevron butterflyfish, Chaetodon trifascialis Quoy and Gaimard, 1825 (Red Sea south to Tugela River)
- Purple butterflyfish or melon butterflyfish, Chaetodon trifasciatus Mungo Park, 1797 (Indo-Pacific from Kosi Bay to Hawaii)
- Limespot butterflyfish or teardrop butterflyfish, Chaetodon unimaculatus Bloch, 1787 (Indian Ocean south to Port Alfred)
- Vagabond butterflyfish, Chaetodon vagabundus Linnaeus, 1758 (Red Sea south to Durban)
- Yellowhead butterflyfish, Chaetodon xanthocephalus Bennett, 1832 (Western Indian Ocean south to Durban)
- Zanzibar butterflyfish Chaetodon zanzibarensis Playfair, 1867 (Zanzibar to Durban)
- Yellow longnose butterflyfish, Forcipiger flavissimus Jordan & McGregor, 1898 (Red Sea to Durban)
- Brushtooth butterflyfish Hemitaurichthys zoster (Bennett, 1831) (Western Indian Ocean south to Sodwana Bay)
- Coachman or pennant coralfish, Heniochus acuminatus (Linnaeus, 1758) (Port Alfred to Mozambique) (Indo-West Pacific south to Durban)
- Schooling coachman or schooling bannerfish, Heniochus diphreutes Jordan, 1903 (Red Sea and Indo-West Pacific south to Durban))
- Masked coachman, Heniochus monoceros Cuvier, 1831 (Indo-West Pacific south to Cape Vidal)

Family: Drepaneidae – Sicklefishes

- Concertina-fish, Drepane longimana (Bloch and Schneider, 1801) (Tropical Indo-West Pacific south to East London)

Family: Ephippidae – Batfishes

- Orbicular batfish, Platax orbicularis (Forsskål, 1775) (Indo-West Pacific south to Knysna)
- Dusky batfish, Platax pinnatus (Linnaeus. 1758) (Indo-West Pacific south to Sodwana Bay, possibly Durban)
- Longfin batfish, Platax teira (Forsskål, 1775) (Indo-West Pacific south to Algoa Bay)
- African spadefish, Tripterodon orbis Playfair, 1867 (Port Elizabeth to Kenya)

Family: Leiognathidae – Soapies

- Slender soapy, Deveximentum insidiator (Bloch, 1787), recorded as syn. Secutor insidiator (Bloch, 1787), (Indo-West Pacific south to East London)
- Toothed soapy, Gazza minuta (Bloch, 1797) (Indo-Pacific south to Port Alfred)
- Slimy, Leiognathus equula (Forsskål, 1775) (Indo-Pacific south to East London)
- Pugnose soapy, Leiognathus ruconius (Hamilton, 1822), recorded as syn. Secutor ruconius (Hamilton-Buchanan, 1822), (Indo-West Pacific south to Transkei)

Family: Lobotidae – Tripletails

- Atlantic tripletail, Lobotes surinamensis (Bloch, 1790) (Cape St Francis northwards, all tropical and subtropical oceans)

Family: Luvaridae – Louvar

- Louvar, Luvarus imperialis Rafinesque, 1810 (All oceans and Mediterranean sea, Not reported in polar seas or near equator)

Family: Pomacanthidae – Angelfishes

- Tiger angelfish, Apolemichthys kingi Heemstra, 1984 (Only known from off Natal: Durban, Tongaat and Aliwal shoal)
- Threespot angelfish, Apolemichthys trimaculatus (Lacepède, 1831) (Indo-West Pacific to Natal)
- Jumping bean, orangeback angelfish, Centropyge acanthops (Norman, 1922) (Port Elizabeth to Somalia)
- Coral beauty, twospined angelfish, Centropyge bispinosa (Günther, 1860) (Indo-West Pacific south to Sodwana)
- Dusky cherub, Centropyge multispinis (Playfair, 1867) (Indo-West Pacific south to Natal)
- Goldtail angelfish, Pomacanthus chrysurus Cuvier, 1831 (Indo-West Pacific south to Aliwal Shoal)
- Emperor angelfish, Pomacanthus imperator (Bloch, 1787) (Indo-West Pacific south to East London)
- Old woman angelfish, Pomacanthus rhomboides (Gilchrist & Thompson, 1908) (Red Sea to Knysna) Previously known as Pomacanthus striatus Rüppell, 1836, but Rüppell's species is a synonym of P. maculosus (Forsskål, 1775)
- Semicircle angelfish, Pomacanthus semicirculatus (Cuvier, 1831) (Indo-West Pacific to Port Elizabeth)
- Royal angelfish, Pygoplites diacanthus (Boddaert, 1772) (Indo-West Pacific south to Sodwana Bay)

Family: Scatophagidae – Scatties

- Scatty, Scatophagus tetracanthus (Lacepède, 1802) (Indo-West Pacific south to Durban)

Family: Siganidae – Rabbitfishes

- Starspotted rabbitfish, Siganus stellatus (Forsskål, 1775) (Kosi Bay north to Red Sea)
- Whitespotted rabbitfish, Siganus sutor (Valenciennes, 1835) (Western Indian Ocean, stragglers as far south as Knysna)

Family: Zanclidae – Moorish idol

- Moorish idol, Zanclus cornutus (Linnaeus, 1758) (Africa to Mexico south to Mossel Bay) (syn. Zanclus canescens)

==== Order Acropomatiformes ====
Family: Acropomatidae – Lanternbellies

- Lanternbelly, Acropoma japonicum Günther, 1859 (off Natal)
- Japanese splitfin, Synagrops japonicus (Doderlein, 1884) (off Natal)
- Sombre splitfin or silver splitfin, Verilus cynodon (Regan, 1921), reported as syn. Neoscombrops annectens Gilchrist, 1922 (off Natal and southern Mozambique) and as syn. Neoscombrops cynodon (Regan, 1921) (Known from 2 specimens off Natal)

Family: Bathyclupeidae – Bathyclupeids

- Neobathyclupea elongata (Trunov, 1975), recorded as syn. Bathyclupea elongata Trunov, 1975 (Known only from holotype taken off Western Cape)

Family: Champsodontidae – Gapers

- Gaper, Champsodon capensis (Regan, 1908) (Cape of Good Hope to Durban)

Family: Creediidae – Sand burrowers

- Longfin burrower, Apodocreedia vanderhorsti de Beaufort, 1948 (Durban to Delagoa Bay)
- Sand submarine, Limnichthys nitidus Smith 1958 (Red Sea south to Chaka's Rock, KwaZulu-Natal)

Family: Epigonidae – Cardinal fishes

- Pencil cardinal, Epigonus denticulatus Dieuzeide, 1950 (Walvis Bay to Cape Point)
- Epigonus pandionis (Goode & Bean, 1881) (Gulf of Guinea to Agulhas Bank)
- Robust cardinalfish, Epigonus robustus (Barnard, 1927) (off west coast of South Africa)
- Telescope cardinal, Epigonus telescopus (Risso, 1810) (Walvis Bay to Cape Town)

Family: Howellidae

- Howella sherborni (Norman, 1930) (off Cape Town to Natal)

Family: Pempheridae – Sweepers

- Slender sweeper, Parapriacanthus ransonneti Steindachner, 1870 (Red Sea south to Transkei)
- Dusky sweeper, Pempheris adusta Bleeker, 1877 (Indo-West Pacific south to Transkei)
- Black-stripe sweeper, Pempheris schwenkii Bleeker, 1855 (Indo-West Pacific south to Natal)

Family: Pentacerotidae – Armourheads

- Sailfin armourhead, Histiopterus typus Temminck & Schlegel, 1844 (Cape Agulhas to Natal)
- Cape armourhead, Pentaceros capensis Cuvier, 1829 (Port Nolloth to Southern Mozambique)
- Pelagic armourhead, Pentaceros richardsoni, Smith, 1844, recorded as Pseudopentaceros richardsoni, (Smith, 1844) (Cape Town to Natal)

Family: Polyprionidae – Wreckfishes

- Atlantic wreckfish, Polyprion americanus (Schneider, 1801) (Norway to South Africa)

Family: Scombropidae – Gnomefishes

- Gnomefish, Scombrops boops (Houttuyn, 1782) (Cape of Good Hope to Delagoa Bay)

==== Order Albuliformes – Bonefishes ====
Family: Albulidae

- Bonefish, Albula vulpes (Linnaeus, 1758) (Algoa Bay to tropics)

==== Order Anguilliformes – Eels ====
Family: Anguillidae – Freshwater eels

- African mottled eel, Anguilla labiata (Peters, 1852), recorded as syn. Anguilla bengalensis labiata (Peters, 1852) (Knysna to Kenya)
- Shortfin eel or Indonesian shortfin eel, Anguilla bicolor, recorded as syn. Anguilla bicolor bicolor McClelland, 1844 (Knysna to Kenya)
- Madagascar mottled eel or giant mottled eel, Anguilla marmorata Quoy and Gaimard, 1824 (Western Cape to Kenya)
- Longfin eel or African longfin eel, Anguilla mossambica (Peters, 1852) (Most waters of the Cape northwards)

Family: Chlopsidae – False morays

- Plain false moray, Kaupichthys hyoproroides (Strömman, 1896) (Natal)

Family: Moringuidae – Spaghetti eels

- Spaghetti eel or lesser thrush eel, Moringua microchir (Bleeker, 1853) (Natal to Indo-West Pacific)

Family: Muraenidae – Moray eels

- Anarchias seychellensis Smith, 1962 (Sodwana Bay)
- Whiteface moray, Echidna leucotaenia Schultz, 1943 (Natal northwards and east to central Pacific)
- Floral moray or snowflake moray, Echidna nebulosa (Ahl, 1789) (Port Alfred to Mozambique)
- Barred moray, Echidna polyzona (Richardson, 1945) (Natal northwards, Indo-Pacific)
- Blackcheek moray eel, Gymnothorax breedeni McCosker and Randall, 1977 (Sodwana Bay))
- Latticetail moray, Gymnothorax buroensis (Bleeker, 1857) (Natal northwards, Indo-Pacific))
- Tiger moray, Gymnothorax enigmaticus McCosker and Randall, 1882 (Natal, Indo-Pacific))
- Salt and pepper moray or Abbott's moray eel, Gymnothorax eurostus (Abbott, 1861) (Transkei to Bazaruto))
- Honeycomb moray or laced moray, Gymnothorax favagineus Bloch & Schneider, 1801 (Port Elizabeth to Mozambique)) or reticulated moray, reported as syn. Gymnothorax permistus (Smith, 1962) (Transkei to Delagoa Bay)
- Yellow-edged moray, Gymnothorax flavimarginatus (Rüppell, 1830) (Transkei northwards, Indo-Pacific)
- Freckled moray, brown-spotted moray eel, Gymnothorax fuscomaculatus (Schultz, 1953) (Natal; Central Pacific)
- Geometric moray, Gymnothorax griseus (Lacepède, 1803) (Transkei to Red Sea)(syn. Sideria grisea)
- White-spotted moray eel, Gymnothorax johnsoni (Smith, 1962) (Algoa Bay to Sodwana Bay)
- Trunk-eyed moray or blotch-necked moray eel, Gymnothorax margaritophorus (Bleeker, 1865) (Transkei to Bazaruto, Indo-Pacific)
- Blackspot moray, Gymnothorax melatremus (Schultz, 1953) (Sodwana Bay)
- Guineafowl moray or turkey moray, Gymnothorax meleagris (Shaw and Nodder, 1795) (Algoa Bay to southern Mozambique; Indo-Pacific)
- Starry moray, Gymnothorax nudivomer (Günther, 1867)(Transkei to Zanzibar)
- Paintspotted moray, Gymnothorax pictus (Ahl, 1789) (Natal to Indo-Pacific)(syn. Siderea picta)
- Leopard moray or undulated moray, Gymnothorax undulatus (Lacepède, 1803) (Port Alfred to southern Mozambique; Indo-Pacific)
- Bar-tail moray or barred-fin moray, Gymnothorax zonipectis Seale, 1906 (Sodwana Bay, central Pacific)
- Zebra moray, Gymnomuraena zebra (Shaw, 1797), also reported as syn. Echidna zebra, (Transkei to Mozambique))
- Tiger reef-eel, Scuticaria tigrina (Lesson, 1828) (Natal to Southern Mozambique; Indo-Pacific)(syn. Uropterygius tigrinus(Lesson, 1829))
- Slender giant moray, Strophidon sathete (Hamilton, 1822) (Bashee River to tropical Indo-Pacific)(syn. Thyrsoidea macrura (Bleeker, 1854))
- Uniform reef-eel, Uropterygius concolor Rüppell, 1838 (Durban to Red Sea)
- Barlip reef eel, Uropterygius kamar McCosker and Randall, 1977 (Sodwana Bay; Indo-Pacific)
- Shortfinned reef eel, Uropterygius micropterus (Bleeker, 1852) (Durban northwards; Indo-Pacific)
- Freckleface reef eel, Uropterygius xanthopterus Bleeker, 1859 (Sodwana Bay to southern Mozambique: Indo-Pacific)

Family: Congridae – Conger eels

- Blunt-tooth conger, Ariosoma mauritianum (Pappenheim, 1914) (Natal to Indo-West Pacific)
- Tropical conger, Ariosoma scheelei (Stromman, 1896) (Natal to Mozambique and Indo-Pacific)
- Hairy conger, Bassanago albescens (Barnard, 1923) (Cape Point)
- Longnose conger, Bathycongrus wallacei (Castle, 1968), recorded as syn, Rhechias wallacei (Castle, 1968) (Natal to southern Mozambique)
- Large-toothed conger, Bathyuroconger vicinus (Vaillant, 1888) (off Cape Point)
- Indo-Pacific shorttail conger, Coloconger scholesi Chan, 1967 (Natal to southern Mozambique)
- Blackedged conger or longfin African conger, Conger cinereus Rüppell, 1830 (Mossel Bay to Mozambique)
- Cape conger, Conger wilsoni (Bloch and Schneider 1801) (Cape to southern Mozambique)
- Southern conger, Gnathophis capensis (Kaup, 1856) (False Bay to Plettenberg Bay)
- Strap conger, Gnathophis habenatus (Richardson, 1848) (Southern Cape to East London)
- Longtail conger or slender conger, Uroconger lepturus (Richardson, 1854) (Natal to Red Sea and Indo-Pacific)

Family: Derichthyidae – Longneck eels

- Narrownecked oceanic eel, Derichthys serpentinus Gill, 1884 (west of Cape Town; worldwide)
- Duckbill oceanic eel, Nessorhamphus ingolfianus (Schmidt, 1912) (off the Cape, also worldwide)

Family: Muraenesocidae – Pike congers

- Common pike conger, Muraenesox bagio (Hamilton-Buchanan, 1822) (Knysna to Indo-Pacific)

Family: Nettastomatidae – Witch eels

- Whipsnout sorcerer, Venefica proboscidea (Vaillant, 1888) (off the Cape)

Family: Ophichthidae – Snake-eels and worm-eels

- Snake eel, Apterichtus klazingai (Weber. 1913) (off Durban; Indonesia and western Pacific)
- Longtailed sand-eel, Bascanichthys kirkii (Günther, 1870) (Natal to Aden)
- Crocodile snake eel, Brachysomophis crocodilinus (Bennett, 1833) (Natal, Tanzania, Seychelles, Mauritius and Indo-Pacific)
- Marbled snake-eel, Callechelys marmorata (Bleeker, 1853) (Natal to central Indo-Pacific)
- Fringelip snake-eel, Cirrhimuraena playfairii (Günther, 1870) (Kosi Bay to Zanzibar)
- Sharpnose sand-eel, Ichthyapus acuticeps (Barnard, 1923) (Durban to Zululand)
- Finny sand-eel or oriental worm-eel, Lamnostoma orientale (McClelland, 1844) (Natal)
- Halfbanded snake-eel or saddled snake-eel, Leiuranus semicinctus (Lay and Bennett, 1839) (Knysna to Indo-Pacific)
- Ocellated snake-eel Myrichthys maculosus (Cuvier, 1816) (Port Alfred to Kenya, Indo-Pacific and eastern PacificM)
- Bluntnose snake eel, Ophichthus apicalis (Bennett, 1830) (St Francis Bay to Kenya, Madagascar and Indo-Pacific)
- Slender snake-eel, Ophichthus serpentinus Seale, 1917, recorded as syn. Ophichthus bennettai McCosker, 1986 (Cape Province west coast)
- Saddled snake-eel Ophichthus erabo (Jordan and Snyder, 1901) (off Durban; Indo-Pacific to Hawaii)
- Shorthead snake eel, Ophichthus marginatus (Peters, 1855) (Knysna; Aldabra to Inhaca)
- Plain snake eel, Ophichthus unicolor Regan, 1908 (Algoa Bay)
- Sand snake-eel or serpent eel, Ophisurus serpens (Linnaeus 1766) (Angola to southern Mozambique)
- Estuary snake-eel or rice-paddy eel, Pisodonophis boro (Hamilton-Buchanan, 1822) (Knysna to Indo-Pacific)
- Longfin snake-eel, Pisodonophis cancrivorus (Richardson, 1844) (Algoa Bay to Indo-Pacific)
- Slender worm-eel, Scolecenchelys gymnota (Bleeker, 1857) (Bredasdorp to Zululand, east Africa to central Pacific)(syn. Muraenichthys gymnotus Bleeker, 1864)
- Redfin worm-eel, Scolecenchelys laticaudata (Ogilby, 1897) (East London to Indo-Pacific)(syn. Muraenichthys laticaudata (Ogilby, 1897)
- Orangehead worm-eel, Scolecenchelys xorae (Smith, 1958) (Algoa Bay to Natal)(syn. Muraenichthys xorae Smith, 1958)
- Earthworm snake-eel, Yirrkala lumbricoides (Bleeker 1853) (off Durban; Northern Australia and Indo Pacific)
- Thin sand-eel, Yirrkala tenuis (Günther, 1870)(Natal to southern Mozambique, Red Sea and possibly Mauritius)

Family: Nemichthyidae – Snipe eels

- Avocettina acuticeps (Regan, 1916) (offshore Cape to Natal)
- Avocettina paucipora Nielsen and Smith, 1978 (off Durban)
- Nemichthys curvirostris (Strömman, 1896) (off the Cape)
- Nemichthys scolopaceus (Richardson, 1848) (off the Cape to Natal)

Family: Serrivomeridae – Sawtooth eels

- Serrivomer beanii Gill and Ryder, 1883 (off Cape and Natal)

Family: Synaphobranchidae – Cutthroat eels

- Diastobranchus capensis Barnard, 1923 (off Cape Point)
- Arrowtooth eel, Dysomma anguillare Barnard, 1923 (Off Tugela river, Natal)
- Histiobranchus bathybius (Günther, 1877) (off Durban)
- Ilyophis brunneus Gilbert, 1892 (Off the Cape)
- Simenchelys parasitica Gill, 1879 (off the Cape)
- Synaphobranchus affinis Günther, 1877 (off Durban)
- Synaphobranchus kaupii Johnson, 1862 (off the Cape)

==== Order Alepocephaliformes ====
Family: Alepocephalidae – Slickheads

- Alepocephalus australis Barnard 1923 (Off Cape Point; apparently widely distributed in temperate waters of southern hemisphere)
- Rouleina maderensis Maul, 1948 (3 specimens from off South Africa)
- Talismania kotlyari Sazonov & Ivanov, 1980 (One specimen from 24°55'S, 35°40'E)
- Bluntsnout smooth-head, Xenodermichthys copei (Gill, 1884) (common off South Africa)

==== Order Argentiniformes ====
Family: Argentinidae – Argentines

- Argentina euchus Cohen, 1961 (Natal to Kenya)

Family: Opisthoproctidae – Barreleyes

- Rhynchohyalus natalensis (Gilchrist and von Bonde, 1924) (off Cape Town to Bermuda)

Family: Microstomatidae

- Nansenia macrolepis (Gilchrist, 1922) (off Natal; West of Cape Peninsula)

Subfamily: Bathylaginae – Deep sea smelts

- Melanolagus bericoides (Borodin, 1929), recorded as syn. Bathylagus bericoides (Borodin, 1929) (off Cape Town; Throughout tropical and subtropical seas)

==== Order Ateleopodiformes ====
Family: Ateleopodidae – Tadpole fishes

- Ateleopus natalensis Regan, 1921 (Cape to Red sea)
- Guentherus altivela Osorio, 1917 (West coast of Africa from Cabo Blanco to the Cape)
- Ijimaia loppei Roule, 1922 (Morocco to Cape Peninsula)

==== Order Atheriniformes ====
Family: Atherinidae – Silversides

- Cape silverside, Atherina breviceps Valenciennes, 1835 (Luderitz to northern KwaZulu-Natal)
- Hardyhead silverside, Atherinomorus lacunosus (Forster, 1801) (East London to Indo-West Pacific)
- Pricklenose silverside, Atherion africanum Smith, 1965 (Natal to India)
- Slender silverside, Hypoatherina barnesi Schultz, 1953 (Natal to Comores)

Family: Notocheiridae – Surf sprites

- Surf sprite, Iso natalensis Regan, 1919 (Indian ocean south to Cape Agulgas)

==== Order Aulopiformes ====
Family: Alepisauridae – Lancetfishes

- Lancetfish or shortsnout lancetfish, Alepisaurus brevirostris Gibbs, 1960 (one specimen from off Algoa Bay; in all major oceans)
- Longsnout lancetfish, Alepisaurus ferox Lowe, 1833 (Walvis Bay to Sodwana Bay; in all major oceans)

Family: Evermannellidae – Sabretooth fishes

- Coccorella atlantica (Parr, 1928) (central water areas of all 3 major oceans; off western and south-western Cape coast, 1 specimen from 31°34'S, 30°09'E)
- Balbo sabretooth, Evermannella balbo (Risso, 1820) (4 specimens from off southern Natal, presumed to be circumglobal in transition region of southern oceans)

Family Omosudidae

- Hammerjaw, Omosudis lowii Günther, 1887 (1 specimen from not far off east coast at about 25°S; otherwise known from all oceans between 40°S and 40°N)

Family: Paralepididae – Barracudinas (incl. Anotopteridae – Daggertooths)

- Anotopterus pharao Zugmeyer, 1911 (off west coast; south of Cape Agulhas; off Transkei and in Mozambique channel; worldwide between 25°N and 65°S)
- Lestidiops jayakari (Boulenger, 1889) (worldwide in tropical to temperate waters)
- Lestidiops similis (Ege, 1933) (Tropical and temperate Atlantic between 45°N and 45°S)
- Lestidium atlanticum (Borodin, 1928) (Tropical to subtropical all oceans)
- Lestrolepis intermedia (Poey, 1868) (Tropical in all oceans; off South Africa only in Agulhas current)
- Macroparalepis affinis Ege, 1933 (anti-tropical in Atlantic Ocean)
- Macroparalepis macrogeneion Post, 1973 (South Atlantic sub-tropical convergence area from South Africa to continental slope off South America)
- Magnisudis prionosa (Rofen, 1963) (Circumglobal in southern oceans from 20°S to Antarctic)
- Spotted barracudina, Arctozenus risso (Bonaparte, 1840), recorded as syn. Notolepis rissoi (Bonaparte, 1840) (worldwide in temperate and tropical waters)
- Paralepis elongata (Brauer, 1906) (One specimen from Natal, now missing)
- Stemonosudis elegans (Ege, 1933) (tropical Indo-Pacific, off South Africa only in Agulhas current)
- Stemonosudis gracilis (Ege, 1933) (Tropical waters of Indian and Pacific oceans; Off South Africa only in Agulhas current)
- Sudis hyalina Rafinesque, 1810 (Atlantic Ocean from 50°N to South Africa)

Family: Scopelarchidae – Pearleyes

- Benthalbella infans Zugmayer, 1911 (off south-western Cape; tropical/subtropical in all 3 major oceans)
- Lagiacrusichthys macropinnis (Bussing & Bussing, 1966), recorded as Benthalbella macropinna Bussing and Bussing, 1966 (off south-western Cape coast; circumpolar in subantarctic and Antarctic waters)
- Short fin pearleye, Scopelarchus analis (Brauer, 1902) (Common off southern Africa; tropical/subtropical all oceans)
- Staring pearleye, Scopelarchus guentheri Alcock, 1896 (off Durban; mainly tropical in the Atlantic, tropical/subtropical in Indian and Pacific oceans)
- Bigfin pearleye, Scopelarchus michaelsarsi Koefoed, 1955 (South-east of Durban;tropical/subtropical in all oceans)

Family: Ipnopidae

- Black lizardfish, Bathysauropsis gracilis (Günther, 1878) (off Cape Point; circumglobal in southern oceans)

Family: Chlorophthalmidae – Greeneyes

- Chlorophthalmus punctatus Gilchrist, 1904 (both coasts of South Africa) (possibly a synonym of C.agassizii Bonaparte, 1840)

Family: Ipnopidae

- Bathymicrops regis Hjort and Koefoed, 1912 (once off Port Elizabeth in Agulhas basin)
- Bathypterois filiferus Gilchrist, 1906 (off Cape Point)
- Bathypterois guentheri Alcock, 1889 (off east coast between 22° - 33°S)
- Bathypterois phenax Parr, 1928 (off Cape Point)
- Bathytyphlops marionae Mead, 1959 (off Beira, Durban and Agulhas bank)
- Grideye fish, Ipnops agassizii Garman, 1899 (off Cape Point)

Family: Notosudidae – Notosudids

- Scopelosaurus ahlstromi Bertelsen, Krefft and Marshall, 1976 (all 3 oceans from about 32° to 45°S)
- Scopelosaurus hamiltoni (Waite, 1916) (Southern oceans from about 30° to 60°S)
- Scopelosaurus herwigi Bertelson, Krefft and Marshall, 1976 (slope areas of Southern Africa)
- Scopelosaurus meadi Bertelson, Krefft and Marshall, 1976 (from about 19° to 43°S)
- Scopelosaurus smithii Bean, 1925 (mainly tropical, larger juveniles and adults also subtropical in all 3 oceans)

Family: Bathysauridae

- Bathysaurus ferox Günther, 1878 (off Cape Province; Both sides of Atlantic; off New Zealand)

Family: Giganturidae – Telescopefish

- Gigantura indica Brauer, 1901, recorded as syn. Rosaura indica (Brauer, 1901) (Tropical/subtropical in all 3 major oceans; Indian Ocean from 35°49'S, 23°09'E northwards)

Family: Synodontidae – Lizardfishes

- Blotchy lizardfish, Saurida gracilis (Quoy and Gaimard, 1824) (Indo-West Pacific to Algoa Bay)
- Largescale lizardfish, Saurida undosquamis (Richardson, 1848) (Indo-West Pacific to Knysna)
- Spotnose lizardfish, Synodus binotatus Schultz, 1953 (Indo-West Pacific, south to Natal)
- Variegated lizardfish, Synodus dermatogenys Fowler, 1912 (Indo-West Pacific south to Algoa Bay)
- Indian lizardfish, Synodus indicus (Day, 1873) (Mossel Bay to Red Sea and Sri Lanka)
- Blacktail lizardfish, Synodus jaculum Russell and Cressey, 1979 (Indo-West Pacific south to Natal)
- Redband lizardfish, Synodus variegatus (Lacepède, 1803) (Central KwaZulu-Natal to Red Sea)
- Painted lizardfish, Trachinocephalus myops (Forster, 1801) (Tropical and warm temperate waters of all oceans, east coast south to Knysna)

==== Order Batrachoidiformes ====
Family: Batrachoididae – Toadfishes

- Puzzled toadfish, Austrobatrachus foedus (Smith, 1947) (Algoa Bay to Coffee Bay, Transkei)
- White-ribbed toadfish, Batrichthys albofasciatus Smith, 1934 (1 specimen, Great Fish Point)
- Snakehead toadfish, Batrichthys apiatus (Valenciennes, 1837) (Saldanha Bay to Umtata River, Transkei)
- Pleated toadfish, Batrichthys felinus Smith, 1952 (Cape to Port Alfred)
- Chocolate toadfish, Chatrabus hendersoni Smith, 1952 (Port Alfred to Storms River Mouth)
- Broadbodied toadfish, Riekertia ellisi Smith, 1952 (Durban to Port St. Johns)

==== Order Beloniformes ====
Family: Belonidae – Needlefishes

- Barred needlefish ot flat needlefish, Ablennes hians (Valenciennes, 1846) (Worldwide in tropical and subtropical waters, south to Algoa Bay)
- Cape needlefish, Petalichthys capensis Regan, 1904 (South African endemic, False Bay to Pondoland)
- Garfish or yellow needlefish or banded needlefish, Strongylura leiura (Bleeker, 1850) (Durban to Persian Gulf)
- Crocodile needlefish or houndfish, Tylosurus crocodilus crocodilus (Peron and Lesueur, 1821) (Indo-West Pacific south to Knysna)

Family: Exocoetidae – Flyingfishes

- Blackwing flyingfish, Cheilopogon cyanopterus (Valenciennes, 1846) (Tropical and subtropical Atlantic, Indian and Pacific oceans. One juvenile from Port Alfred, another from Natal)
- Spotfin flyingfish, Cheilopogon furcatus (Mitchill, 1815) (offshore in all tropical seas. Off South African coast from the Cape eastwards)
- Blackfin flyingfish, Cheilopogon nigricans (Bennett, 1840) (Tropical eastern Atlantic to Indo-West Pacific. One specimen known from South African waters)
- Smallhead flyingfish, Cheilopogon pinnatibarbatus altipinnis (Valenciennes, 1846) (Cape to Kosi Bay)
- Two-wing flyingfish, Exocoetus monocirrhus (Richardson, 1846) (Indo-West Pacific south to Durban)
- Tropical two-wing flyingfish, Exocoetus volitans (Linnaeus, 1758) (worldwide in tropical waters, occasionally seen in South African waters)
- Subtropical flyingfish, Hirundichthys rondeletii (Valenciennes, 1846) (widely distributed in subtropical waters of all oceans, common off the Cape)
- Mirrorwing flyingfish, Hirundichthys speculiger (Valenciennes, 1846) (worldwide in tropical waters, one juvenile from Mbibi, Zululand, another from False Bay)
- Sailfin flying fish, Parexocoetus brachypterus (Richardson, 1846) (Tropical Indo-Pacific, south to Natal)
- Shortfin flyingfish, Prognichthys brevipinnis (Valenciennes, 1846) (Tropical Indo-West Pacific, recorded from Lake St. Lucia and Indian Ocean off South Africa)
- Shortnose flyingfish, Prognichthys sealei (Abe, 1955) (Tropical Indo-West Pacific; one adolescent off Cape St. Lucia and a small juvenile from Port Elizabeth)

Family: Hemiramphidae – Halfbeaks

- Ribbon halfbeak, Euleptorhamphus viridis (van Hasselt, 1823) (reported from Table Bay, also known from Algoa bay and Kei river Mouth. Tropical and temperate waters of Indo-Pacific)
- Spotted halfbeak, Hemiramphus far (Forsskål, 1775) (Knysna to Delagoa Bay. a few records west to False Bay)
- Tropical halfbeak, Hyporhamphus affinis (Günther, 1866) (Sodwana Bay to tropical west Indo-Pacific)
- Cape halfbeak, Hyporhamphus capensis (Thominot, 1886) (False Bay to southern Mozambique)

Family: Scomberesocidae – Sauries

- Dwarf saury, Nanichthys simulans Hubbs and Wisner, 1980 (Warm temperate waters of the Atlantic and southern Indian oceans; Off the Cape up the west coast)

==== Order Beryciformes ====
Family: Barbourisiidae – Red whalefish

- Velvet whalefish, Barbourisia rufa Parr, 1954 (occasionally trawled off West Coast. Atlantic Ocean (56°N- 35°S))

Family: Berycidae – Berycids

- Beryx or alfonsino, Beryx decadactylus Cuvier, 1829 (Saldanha Bay to Natal)
- Slender beryx or splendid alfonsino, Beryx splendens Lowe, 1834 (Saldanha Bay to Natal)
- Short alfonsino, Centroberyx spinosus (Gilchrist, 1903) (Storms river to Durban) (also reported from False Bay)

Family: Cetomimidae – Whalefishes

- Cetichthys indagator (Rofen, 1959), recorded as syn. Cetomimus indagator Rofen, 1959 (1 specimen off Port St Johns, former Transkei)
- Cetomimus picklei (Gilchrist, 1922) (1 specimen off Cape Town)

Family: Melamphaidae – Bigscale fishes

- Melamphaes eulepis Ebeling, 1962 (Atlantic south of 13°S, around Africa, in Indian Ocean, throughout Indonesia and in central equatorial Pacific)
- Melamphaes microps (Günther, 1878) (off South Africa and New Zealand)
- Melamphaes simus Ebeling, 1962 (Tropical/subtropical regions of Atlantic, Indian and Pacific oceans)
- Poromitra crassiceps (Günther, 1878) (All oceans except Arctic and Mediterranean)
- Poromitra megalops (Lütken, 1877) (Eastern Atlantic, Indo-Pacific and eastern equatorial Pacific)
- Scopeloberyx robustus (Günther, 1887) (Tropical/subtropical regions of Atlantic, Indian and Pacific oceans)
- Scopelogadus beanii (Günther, 1887) (Atlantic, southern Indian and western south Pacific oceans)
- Sio nordenskjoldii (Lönnberg, 1905) (South Atlantic and Indian oceans south of 30°S; several records off South Africa)

Family: Rondeletiidae – Redmouth whalefish

- Rondeletia loricata Abe and Hotta, 1963 (3 specimens taken off Southern Cape coast of South Africa)

Family: Stephanoberycidae – Pricklefishes

- Acanthochaenus lutkeni Gill, 1884 (off mid Atlantic USA, Azores and off Durban (29°42'S, 33°19'E)

==== Order Blenniiformes ====
Family: Blenniidae – Blennies

- Dwarf blenny, Alloblennius parvus Springer & Spreitzar, 1978 (Comores and 1 specimen from Sodwana Bay)
- Moustached rockskipper, Antennablennius australis Fraser-Brunner, 1951 (Port Elizabeth to Red Sea)
- Horned rockskipper, Antennablennius bifilum (Günther, 1861) (Port Alfred to the Persian Gulf)
- Floating blenny, Aspidontus dussumieri (Valenciennes, 1836) (Red Sea south to Knysna)
- Mimic blenny or false cleanerfish, Aspidontus taeniatus Quoy & Gaimard, 1834 (Red Sea south to Durban) (syn. Aspidontus taeniatus tractus Fowler, 1903)
- Picture rockskipper, Blenniella gibbifrons (Quoy & Gaimard, 1824), recorded as syn. Istiblennius gibbifrons (Quoy & Gaimard, 1836) (Indo-West Pacific south to Sodwana Bay)
- Bullethead rockskipper, Blenniella periophthalmus (Valenciennes, 1836), recorded as syn. Istiblennius periophthalmus (Valenciennes, 1836) (Indo-Pacific south to Durban)
- Looseskin blenny, Chalaroderma capito (Valenciennes, 1836) (Saldanha Bay to East London)
- Two-eyed blenny, Chalaroderma ocellata (Gilchrist and Thompson, 1908) (Saldanha Bay to Port Elizabeth)
- Blackflap blenny, Cirripectes auritus (Carlson, 1981) (Line islands, Philippines, Grand Comoro, Kenya and Sodwana Bay)
- Muzzled rockskipper, Cirripectes castaneus (Valenciennes, 1836) (Indo-West Pacific south to Sodwana Bay)
- Golden blenny or Midas blenny, Ecsenius midas (Starck, 1969) (Red Sea to Sodwana Bay)
- Nalolo, Ecsenius nalolo Smith, 1959 (Red Sea to Sodwana Bay)
- Fringelip rockskipper, Entomacrodus epalzeocheilos (Bleeker, 1859) (Indo-Pacific, 1 specimen from Sodwana Bay)
- Pearly rockskipper, Entomacrodus striatus (Valenciennes, 1836), (Western Indian Ocean to 30°S)
- Leopard rockskipper, Exallias brevis (Kner, 1868) (Red Sea to Sodwana Bay)
- Highbrow rockskipper, Hirculops cornifer (Rüppell, 1830) (Red Sea to Pondoland)
- Impspringer, Istiblennius bellus (Günther, 1861) recorded as syn. Istiblennius impudens Smith, 1959 (Western Indian Ocean south to Sodwana Bay)
- Streaky rockskipper, Istiblennius dussumieri (Valenciennes, 1836) (Indo-Pacific south to Bashee River)
- Rippled rockskipper, Istiblennius edentulus (Forster & Schneider, 1801) (Indo-Pacific south to East London)
- Rusi blenny, Mimoblennius rusi Springer & Spreitzer, 1978 (Known only from Sodwana Bay area)
- Bandit blenny, Omobranchus banditus Smith, 1959, (Bazaruto to Port Alfred)
- Kappie blenny, Omobranchus woodi (Gilchrist & Thompson, 1908) (Eastern Cape estuaries, East London to Knysna)
- Horned blenny, Parablennius cornutus (Linnaeus, 1758) (Northern Namibia to Sodwana Bay, Endemic)
- Ringneck blenny, Parablennius pilicornis (Cuvier, 1829) (Knysna to Sodwana Bay)
- Kosi rockskipper, Pereulixia kosiensis (Regan, 1908) (Durban north to Pakistan)
- Sabretooth blenny, Petroscirtes breviceps (Valenciennes, 1836) (Natal to Japan and New Guinea)
- Twostripe blenny or bluestriped fangblenny, Plagiotremus rhinorhynchos (Bleeker, 1852) (Indo-Pacific south to Knysna)
- Piano blenny or mimic blenny, Plagiotremus tapeinosoma (Bleeker, 1857) (Indo-Pacific south to False Bay)
- Maned blenny, Scartella emarginata (Günther, 1861) (Southern Angola to India)
- Japanese snakeblenny, Xiphasia matsubarai Okada & Suzuki, 1952 (Western Indian Ocean south to False Bay)
- Snakeblenny, Xiphasia setifer Swainson, 1839 (Red Sea to False Bay)

Family: Clinidae – Klipfishes

- Lace klipfish, Blennioclinus brachycephalus (Valenciennes, 1836) (Melkboschstrand to Kei River)
- Silverbubble klipfish, Blennioclinus stella Smith, 1946 (Algoa Bay to north of Durban)
- Snaky klipfish, Blenniophis anguillaris (Valenciennes, 1836) (Lüderitz Bay to East London)
- Striped klipfish, Blenniophis striatus (Gilchrist & Thompson, 1908) (Saldanha Bay to East London)
- Slender platanna-klipfish, Cancelloxus burrelli Smith, 1961 (Orange River to Algoa Bay)
- Whiteblotched klipfish, Cancelloxus elongatus Heemstra and Wright, 1986 (Storms River mouth to Algoa Bay)
- Cancelloxus longior Prochazka & Griffiths, 1991,
- Barbelled klipfish, Cirrhibarbus capensis Valenciennes, 1836 (Lambert's Bay to East London)
- Fleet klipfish, Climacoporus navalis Barnard, 1935 (Still Bay to Port St. Johns. Once from False Bay)
- Ladder klipfish, Clinoporus biporosus (Gilchrist and Thompson, 1908) (Saldanha Bay to False Bay)
- Sad klipfish, Clinus acuminatus (Schneider, 1801) (Lüderitz Bay to west of Algoa Bay)
- Agile klipfish, Clinus agilis Smith, 1931 (Namibia (20°49'S) to Port Alfred)
- Clinus arborescens Gilchrist & Thompson, 1908, previously reported as C. supeciliosus (part of complex)
- Onrust klipfish, Clinus berrisfordi Penrith, 1967 (Weedy areas of False Bay to Skoenmakerskop, just west of Algoa Bay)
- Cape klipfish, Clinus brevicristatus Gilchrist & Thompson, 1908 (Lambert's Bay to False Bay)
- Clinus capensis (Valenciennes, 1836),
- Bluntnose klipfish, Clinus cottoides Valenciennes, 1836 (Olifants River (Namaqualand) to Kei River)
- Clinus exasperatus Holleman, von der Heyden & Zsilavecz, 2012, (Betty's Bay)
- Helen's klipfish, Clinus helenae (Smith, 1946) (Boknes (west of Port Alfred) to Bashee River)
- West coast klipfish, Clinus heterodon Valenciennes, 1836 (Orange River to Cape Agulhas)(Swakopmund to False Bay)
- False Bay klipfish, Clinus latipennis Valenciennes, 1836 (Table Bay to Cape Agulhas)
- Mosaic klipfish, Clinus musaicus Holleman, von der Heyden & Zsilavecz, 2012, (TMNP MPA).
- Chinese klipfish, Clinus nematopterus Günther, 1861 (False Bay and Algoa Bay)
- Ornate klipfish, Clinus ornatus Gilchrist & Thompson, 1908, (TMNP MPA), also previously recorded in C. superciliosus complex.
- Robust klipfish, Clinus robustus Gilchrist & Thompson, 1908 (Cape of Good Hope to East London)
- Kelp klipfish, Clinus rotundifrons Barnard, 1937 (Lüderitz Bay to Cape of Good Hope)
- Bot river klipfish, Clinus spatulatus Bennett, 1983 (Bot River and Kleinmond estuary)
- Super klipfish or highfin klipfish, Clinus superciliosus (Linnaeus, 1758) (Namibia (18°59'S) to Kei River) now recognised as a complex containing C. superciliosus, C. ornatus, C. arborescens, C. musaicus and C. exasperatus.
- Bull klipfish, Clinus taurus Gilchrist & Thompson, 1908 (Möwe Point (Namibia) to Port Alfred)
- Speckled klipfish, Clinus venustris Gilchrist & Thompson, 1908 (Orange River to East London)(Lüderitz Bay to Port Alfred)
- Oldman klipfish, Clinus woodi Smith, 1946 (Kei River to Inhambane)
- Mousey klipfish, Fucomimus mus (Gilchrist & Thompson, 1908) (False Bay to Coffee Bay)
- Nosestripe klipfish, Muraenoclinus dorsalis (Bleeker, 1860) (Orange River to Durban)(Lüderitz Bay to southern Natal)
- Bluespotted klipfish, Pavoclinus caeruleopunctatus Zsilavecz, 2001, (TMNP MPA).
- Grass klipfish, Pavoclinus graminis (Gilchrist & Thompson, 1908) (False Bay to Inhambane)
- Rippled klipfish, Pavoclinus laurentii (Gilchrist & Thompson, 1908) (Port Elizabeth to Maputo) (Port Alfred to Inhambane)
- Slinky klipfish, Pavoclinus litorafontis Penrith, 1965 (False Bay; Strandfontein intertidal caulerpa beds, and Onrust river mouth)
- Bearded klipfish, Pavoclinus mentalis (Gilchrist & Thompson, 1908) (Algoa Bay to St. Lucia)
- Mya's klipfish, Pavoclinus myae Christensen, 1978 (East London to Algoa Bay)
- Peacock klipfish, Pavoclinus pavo (Gilchrist & Thompson, 1908) (Lüderitz Bay to Kei River)
- Deepwater klipfish, Pavoclinus profundus Smith, 1961 (Off Knysna to Algoa Bay)
- Deep reef klipfish, Pavoclinus smalei Heemstra & Wright, 1986 (off Storms River mouth)
- Leafy klipfish, Smithichthys fucorum (Gilchrist & Thompson, 1908) (Cape Point to Bashee River)
- Platanna klipfish, Xenopoclinus kochi Smith, 1948 (Lambert's Bay to Algoa Bay)
- Leprous platanna klipfish, Xenopoclinus leprosus Smith, 1961 (Orange River mouth to Algoa Bay)

Family: Tripterygiidae – Threefin blennies or Triplefins

- Cape triplefin, Cremnochorites capensis (Gilchrist & Thompson, 1908) (False Bay to Port Alfred)
- Yellow triplefin, Enneapterygius abeli (Klausewitz, 1960) (Red Sea to northern Natal)
- Barred triplefin, Enneapterygius clarkae (Holleman, 1982) (Red Sea to Natal)
- Highcrest triplefin, Enneapterygius pusillus Rüppell, 1835 (Red Sea to northern Natal)
- Blotched triplefin, Enneapterygius ventermaculus Holleman, 1982 (Natal to Pakistan)
- Blackfin triplefin, Helcogramma fuscopinna Holleman, 1982 (Indian Ocean south to Durban)
- Hotlips triplefin, Helcogramma obtusirostris (Klunzinger, 1871) (Red Sea to Coffee Bay)
- Rough-head triplefin, Norfolkia brachylepis (Schultz, 1960) recorded as syn. Norfolkia springeri Clark, 1979 (Natal to Red Sea)

==== Order Callionymiformes ====
Family: Callionymidae – Dragonets

- Longtail dragonet, Callionymus gardineri Regan, 1908 (Indian Ocean south to Natal)
- Sand dragonet, Callionymus marleyi Regan, 1919 (Cape of Good Hope eastward to Persian Gulf)
- Dainty dragonet, Draculo celetus (Smith, 1963) (Known only from Eastern Cape, Durban and Inhaca island)
- Ladder dragonet, Paracallionymus costatus (Boulenger, 1898) (Lüderitz Bay to Inhaca)
- Deep-water dragonet, Synchiropus monacanthus Smith, 1935 (Port Alfred to Zanzibar)
- Dwarf dragonet, Synchiropus postulus Smith, 1963 (Sodwana Bay to Tanzania)
- Starry dragonet, Synchiropus stellatus Smith, 1963 (Sodwana Bay to northern Mozambique)

==== Order Carangaria incertae sedis ====
Family: Menidae – Moonfish

- Moonfish, Mene maculata (Bloch & Schneider, 1801) (Tropical Indo Pacific south to Durban)

Family: Polynemidae – Threadfins

- Indian threadfin, Leptomelanosoma indicum (Shaw, 1804), recorded as syn. Polydactylus indicus (Shaw, 1804) (Indo-West Pacific south to Durban)
- Striped threadfin, Polydactylus plebeius (Broussonet, 1782) (Red Sea to Knysna)
- Sixfinger threadfin, Polydactylus sextarius (Bloch & Schneider, 1801) (Indo-West Pacific south to Algoa Bay)

Family: Sphyraenidae – Barracudas

- Sharpfin barracuda, Sphyraena acutipinnis Day, 1876 (Indo-Pacific south to Mossel Bay)
- Great barracuda, Sphyraena barracuda (Edwards, 1771) (Natal and all tropical seas except eastern Pacific)
- Yellowstripe barracuda, Sphyraena chrysotaenia Klunzinger, 1884 (Indo-Pacific south to East London)
- Yellowtail barracuda, Sphyraena flavicauda Rüppell, 1838 (Indo-Pacific south to Durban)
- Pickhandle barracuda, Sphyraena jello Cuvier, 1829 (Western Indian Ocean south to Knysna)
- Sawtooth barracuda, Sphyraena putnamiae Jordan & Seale, 1905 (Red Sea to Natal)
- Blackfin barracuda, Sphyraena qenie Klunzinger, 1870 (Indo-Pacific, reported from Natal)

==== Order Carangiformes ====
Family: Carangidae – Kingfishes

- Threadfin mirrorfish or African pompano, Alectis ciliaris (Bloch 1787) (Algoa Bay northwards, cicumtropical)
- Indian mirrorfish or Indian threadfish, Alectis indica (Rüppell, 1830) (Durban northwards throughout Indian Ocean)
- Shrimp scad, Alepes djedaba (Forsskål, 1775) (Durban northwards to Red Sea)
- Longfin kingfish or longfin trevally, Carangoides armatus (Rüppell, 1830) (East London northwards throughout Indian Ocean to Gulf of Thailand and Japan)
- Longnose kingfish or longnose trevally, Carangoides chrysophrys (Cuvier, 1833) (Algoa Bay northward, and eastward to Japan and Australia)
- Coastal kingfish or coastal trevally, Carangoides coeruleopinnatus (Rüppell, 1830) (Durban northwards, and eastwards to Japan and Australia)
- Shadow kingfish or shadow trevally, Carangoides dinema Bleeker, 1851 (Durban northward to Tanzania)
- Whitefin kingfish or whitefin trevally, Carangoides equula (Temminck & Schlegel, 1844) (Algoa Bay northward to Somalia and Gulf of Oman)
- Blue kingfish or blue trevally, Carangoides ferdau (Forsskål, 1775) (Indo-West Pacific south to Port Elizabeth)
- Yellowspotted kingfish or yellowspotted trevally, Carangoides fulvoguttatus (Forsskål, 1775) (Indo-West Pacific south to Durban)
- Bludger, Carangoides gymnostethus (Cuvier, 1833) (Indo-West Pacific to Algoa Bay)
- Bumpnose kingfish or bumpnose trevally, Carangoides hedlandensis (Whitley, 1934) (Durban northwards in coastal waters)
- Malabar kingfish or malabar trevally, Carangoides malabaricus (Bloch & Schneider, 1801) (Tropical Indo-West Pacific south to Durban)
- Coachwhip kingfish or coachwhip trevally, Carangoides oblongus (Cuvier, 1833) (Western Indian Ocean south to Durban)
- Barcheek kingfish or barcheek trevally, Carangoides plagiotaenia (Bleeker, 1857) (Indo-West Pacific south to Durban)
- Blacktip kingfish or blacktip trevally, Caranx heberi (Bennett, 1830), also reported as syn. Caranx sem Cuvier, 1833, (Durban north to Zanzibar)
- Giant kingfish or giant trevally, Caranx ignobilis (Forsskål, 1775) (Indo-West Pacific south to Port Elizabeth)
- Black kingfish, Caranx lugubris Poey, 1860 (Circumtropical. Taken off East London)
- Bluefin kingfish or bluefin trevally, Caranx melampygus Cuvier, 1833 (Tropical Indo-Pacific south to Natal)
- Brassy kingfish or brassy trevally, Caranx papuensis Alleyne & Macleay, 1877 (Port Alfred north to Zanzibar)
- Bigeye kingfish or bigeye trevally, Caranx sexfasciatus Quoy & Gaimard, 1825 (Tropical Ind-Pacific south to Natal)
- Tille kingfish or tille trevally, Caranx tille Cuvier, 1833 (Durban north to Zanzibar)
- Mackerel scad, Decapterus macarellus (Cuvier, 1833) (Knysna northward, Circumtropical)
- Slender scad, Decapterus macrosoma Bleeker, 1851 (Indo-Pacific south to Knysna)
- Indian scad, Decapterus russelli (Rüppell, 1830) (Durban northwards to Japan and Australia)
- Rainbow runner, Elagatis bipinnulata (Quoy & Gaimard, 1825) (Durban northwards, Circumtropical)
- Golden kingfish or golden trevally, Gnathanodon speciosus (Forsskål, 1775), also recorded as syn. Gnathodon speciosus, (Tropical Indo-Pacific south to Northern KwaZulu-Natal)
- Leervis or leerfish or garrick, Lichia amia (Linnaeus, 1758) (Mediterranean sea south along west coast of Africa and around Cape to Delagoa Bay)
- Torpedo scad, Megalaspis cordyla (Linnaeus, 1758) (Tropical Indo-West Pacific south to East London)
- Pilot fish, Naucrates ductor (Linnaeus, 1758) (Circumtropical, common throughout Indian Ocean)
- White kingfish or white trevally, Pseudocaranx dentex (Bloch & Schneider, 1801) (Durban southwards, anti-tropical on both sides of Atlantic, Mediterranean, Indo-West Pacific)
- Talang queenfish, Scomberoides commersonnianus Lacepède, 1801 (Indian Ocean south to Port Elizabeth)
- Doublespotted queenfish, Scomberoides lysan (Forsskål, 1775) (Indo-West Pacific south to Durban)
- Needlescaled queenfish, Scomberoides tol (Cuvier, 1832) (Indian Ocean south to Natal)
- Greater yellowtail or greater amberjack, Seriola dumerili Risso, 1810 (Algoa Bay to Persian Gulf)
- Giant yellowtail or yellowtail amberjack, Seriola lalandi Valenciennes, 1833 (Most common on Atlantic Cape waters, but follows the pilchard migration to Transkei and Natal. Circumglobal in subtropical waters)
- Longfin yellowtail, Seriola rivoliana Valenciennes, 1833 (Knysna northward. Circumtropical entering temperate waters in some places)
- Blackbanded kingfish or black-banded trevally, Seriolina nigrofasciata (Rüppell, 1829) (Indian Ocean south to Algoa Bay)
- Southern pompano, Trachinotus africanus Smith, 1967 (Knysna to Delagoa Bay)
- Smallspotted pompano or smallspotted dart, Trachinotus baillonii (Lacepède, 1801) (Indo-West Pacific south to Natal)
- Snubnose pompano, Trachinotus blochii (Lacepède, 1801) (Indo-West Pacific south to Durban)
- Largespotted pompano, Trachinotus botla (Shaw, 1803) (Algoa Bay to Kenya)
- African maasbanker or Atlantic horse mackerel, Trachurus delagoa Nekrasov, 1970 (Eastern Cape province to Mozambique)
- Maasbanker, Trachurus trachurus (Linnaeus, 1758) (Norway south and round the Cape of Good Hope to Delagoa Bay
- Cottonmouth kingfish or cottonmouth jack, Uraspis secunda (Poey, 1860) (Algoa Bay)

Family: Coryphaenidae – Dolphinfish or Dorades

- Dolphinfish, Coryphaena hippurus Linnaeus, 1758 (all tropical and subtropical waters to 35°S)

Family: Echeneidae – Remoras

- Shark remora, Echeneis naucrates Linnaeus, 1758 (Namibia to Mozambique) (all warm waters except eastern Pacific)
- Slender remora, Phtheirichthys lineatus (Menzies, 1791) (Worldwide in tropical and subtropical waters)
- White remora, Remora albescens (Temminck & Schlegel, 1850) (Worldwide, prefers Manta rays)
- Whale remora, Remora australis (Bennett, 1840) (Worldwide, pelagic: found only on cetaceans)
- Spearfish remora, Remora brachyptera (Lowe, 1839) (Worldwide, prefers billfishes)
- Remora, Remora remora (Linnaeus, 1758) (Worldwide, prefers sharks)

Family: Istiophoridae – Sailfish, spearfishes and marlins

- Sailfish, Indo-Pacific sailfish, Istiophorus platypterus (Shaw, 1792) (Mossel Bay to Mozambique)
- Black marlin, Istiompax indica (Cuvier, 1832), recorded as syn. Makaira indica (Cuvier, 1832) (Primarily Indo-Pacific to off Cape of Good Hope)
- White marlin, Kajikia albida (Poey, 1860), recorded as syn. Tetrapturus albidus Poey, 1861 (Atlantic Ocean)
- Striped marlin, Kajikia audax (Philippi, 1887), recorded as syn. Tetrapturus audax (Philippi, 1887) (Primarily Indo-Pacific, but have been caught off Cape Town)
- Blue marlin, Makaira nigricans (Lacepède, 1802) (Worldwide in all oceans)
- Shortbill spearfish, Tetrapturus angustirostris Tanaka, 1915, (Off Cape Point and Durban northwards throughout Indo-Pacific)
- Longbill spearfish, Tetrapturus pfluegeri Robins & de Sylva, 1963 (Apparently restricted to the Atlantic Ocean)

Family: Rachycentridae – Cobia

- Prodigal son or cobia, Rachycentron canadum (Linnaeus, 1766) (Warm waters of the Atlantic and Indo-Pacific, occasionally reaching False Bay)

Family: Xiphiidae – Swordfishes

- Swordfish, Xiphias gladius Linnaeus, 1758 (Namibia to Natal)

==== Order Centrarchiformes ====
Family: Cheilodactylidae – Fingerfins

- Redfingers, Cheilodactylus fasciatus Lacepède, 1803 (Kunene river, Namibia to Durban)
- Barred fingerfin, Cheilodactylus pixi Smith, 1980 (Knysna to Coffee Bay)(False Bay to Coffee Bay)
- Twotone fingerfin, Chirodactylus brachydactylus (Cuvier, 1830) (Walvis Bay to Delagoa Bay)
- Bank steenbras, Chirodactylus grandis (Günther, 1860) (Walvis Bay to possibly Natal)
- Natal fingerfin, Chirodactylus jessicalenorum Smith, 1980 (Coffee Bay Transkei to Sodwana Bay)

Family: Cirrhitidae – Hawkfishes

- Twospot hawkfish, Amblycirrhitus bimacula (Jenkins, 1903) (Indo-Pacific south to Durban)
- Spotted hawkfish or coral hawkfish, Cirrhitichthys oxycephalus (Bleeker, 1855) (Indo-Pacific south to East London)
- Marbled hawkfish, Cirrhitus pinnulatus (Schneider, 1801) (Indo-Pacific south to Port Alfred)
- Blackspotted hawkfish, Cristacirrhitus punctatus (Cuvier, 1829), recorded as syn. Cirrhitus punctatus (Cuvier, 1829) (Mauritius, Madagascar, Mozanbique and South Africa south to Bizana)
- Swallowtail hawkfish, Cyprinocirrhites polyactis (Bleeker, 1875) (East Africa south to Algoa Bay)
- Horseshoe hawkfish or arc-eye hawkfish, Paracirrhites arcatus (Cuvier, 1829) (Indo-Pacific south to the Transkei)
- Freckled hawkfish or blackside hawkfish, Paracirrhites forsteri (Schneider, 1801) (Indo-Pacific south to Northern KwaZulu-Natal)

Family: Dichistiidae – Galjoens

- Galjoen, Dichistius capensis (Cuvier, 1831) (Southern Angola to Sodwana Bay) (syn. Coracinus capensis)
- Banded galjoen, Dichistius multifasciatus (Pellegrin, 1914) (Port Alfred to Mozambique) (Still Bay to Madagascar) (syn. Coracinus multifaciatus)

Family: Kuhliidae – Flagtails

- Barred flagtail, Kuhlia mugil (Forster in Bloch and Schneider, 1801)(Cape Agulhas to Indo-Pacific)
- Rock flagtail, Kuhlia rupestris (Lacepède, 1802) (Indo-Pacific south to Durban)

Family: Kyphosidae – Sea chubs

- Grey chub, Kyphosus bigibbus Lacepède, 1801 (Red Sea to Cape Point)
- Blue chub, Kyphosus cinerescens (Forsskål, 1775) (Read Sea to East London)
- Brassy chub, Kyphosus vaigiensis (Quoy & Gaimard, 1825) (Indo-Pacific south to Algoa Bay)
- Stone bream, Neoscorpis lithophilus (Gilchrist & Thompson, 1908) (False Bay to southern Mozambique)

Family: Oplegnathidae – Knifejaws

- Cape knifejaw, Oplegnathus conwayi Richardson, 1840 (False Bay to Durban)
- Natal knifejaw, Oplegnathus robinsoni Regan, 1916 (Central KwaZulu-Natal to Mozambique)

Family: Parascorpididae – Jutjaw

- Jutjaw, Parascorpis typus Bleeker, 1875 (Known only from False Bay to Maputo)

Family: Terapontidae – Thornfishes

- Trumpeter, Pelates quadrilineatus (Bloch, 1790) (tropical Indo-Pacific south to Transkei)
- Thornfish, Terapon jarbua (Forsskål, 1775) (Indo-West Pacific to Knysna)
- Straight lined thornfish, Terapon theraps (Cuvier, 1829) (Tropical Indo-Pacific south to Durban)

==== Order Cichliformes ====
Family: Cichlidae – Cichlids

- Mozambique tilapia, Oreochromis mossambicus (Peters, 1852) (Estuaries and rivers from Bushmans River north)

==== Order Clupeiformes ====
Family: Alosidae

- Pilchard or sardine, Sardinops sagax (Jenyns, 1842) (Namibia to Mozambique)

Family: Chirocentridae – Wolfherrings

- Wolfherring or dorab wolf-herring, Chirocentrus dorab (Forsskål, 1775) (Durban to Mozambique)

Family: Dorosomatidae

- Blueline herring or bluestripe herring, Herklotsichthys quadrimaculatus (Rüppell, 1837) (Algoa Bay to Indo-Pacific)
- Razorbelly or Kelee shad, Hilsa kelee (Cuvier, 1829) (Transkei to Mozambique and Indo-Pacific)
- Gizzard shad, Nematalosa nasus (Bloch, 1795) (off Durban Bay; Gulf of Aden to Hong Kong)

Family: Dussumieriidae – Round herrings

- East coast roundherring or red-eye round herring, Etrumeus sadina (Mitchill, 1814), recorded as syn. Etrumeus teres (De Kay, 1842) (Durban to Mozambique border)
- Roundherring or Whitehead's round herring, Etrumeus whiteheadi Wongratana, 1983 (Walvis Bay to KwaZulu-Natal)

Family: Ehiravidae

- Estuarine round herring or Gilchrist's round-herring, Gilchristella aestuaria (Gilchrist, 1913) (Knysna to Kosi bay, Saldanha Bay and possibly north to Orange River mouth)

Family: Engraulidae – Anchovies

- Buccaneer anchovy, Encrasicholina punctifer Fowler, 1938, recorded as syn. Stolephorus punctifer (Fowler, 1938) (St Lucia, possibly Durban, to Indo-Pacific to Hawaii)
- Cape anchovy or Japanese anchovy, Engraulis japonicus Temminck & Schlegel, 1846 (Walvis Bay to Mozambique and Indo-Pacific)
- Thorny anchovy or natal anchovy, Stolephorus holodon (Boulenger, 1900) (Swartkops estuary to northern Mozambique)
- Indian anchovy, Stolephorus indicus (van Hasselt, 1823) (Natal to Indo-Pacific)
- Longjaw glassnose, Thryssa setirostris (Broussonet, 1782) (Transkei through Indian Ocean to Indonesia and China)
- Orangemouth glassnose or bony, Thryssa vitrirostris (Gilchrist & Thompson, 1908) (Port Elizabeth to Mozambique)

Family: Pristigasteridae

- Indian pellona, Pellona ditchela Valenciennes 1847 (Durban to Indo-Pacific)
- White sardinella, Sardinella albella (Valenciennes 1847) (Durban to Indo-Pacific, possibly East London)
- Round sardinella, Sardinella aurita Valenciennes, 1847 (Walvis Bay to Saldanha Bay)
- Goldstripe sardinella, Sardinella gibbosa (Bleeker, 1849) (Port Alfred to Mozambique)

Family: Spratelloididae

- Delicate roundherring, Spratelloides delicatulus (Bennett, 1831) (Zululand to Indo-Pacific)

==== Order Dactylopteriformes ====
Family: Dactylopteridae – Helmet gurnards

- Helmet gurnard or oriental flying gurnard, Dactyloptena orientalis (Cuvier, 1829) (Port Elizabeth northwards; east to central Pacific)
- Starry helmet gurnard, Dactyloptena peterseni (Nyström, 1887) (East London and Delagoa Bay)

Family: Pegasidae – Seamoths

- Seamoth or little dragonfish, Eurypegasus draconis (Linnaeus, 1766) (Indo-West Pacific south to Algoa Bay)
- Longtail seamoth, Pegasus volitans Linnaeus, 1758 (Tropical Indo-West Pacific south to Durban)

==== Order Elopiformes ====
Family: Elopidae – Ladyfishes

- Atlantic ladyfish or West African ladyfish, Elops lacerta Valenciennes, 1846 (Atlantic coast to 23°S)
- Ladyfish or springer, Elops machnata (Forsskål, 1775) (Mossel Bay to Mozambique)

Family: Megalopidae – Tarpons

- Oxeye tarpon or Indo-Pacific tarpon, Megalops cyprinoides (Broussonet, 1782) (Port Alfred to Mozambique)

==== Order Eupercaria incertae sedis ====
Family: Callanthiidae – Goldies

- Goldie, Callanthias legras Smith, 1947 (Dassen Island (Western Cape) to Natal)

Family: Caesionidae – Fusiliers

- Blue-and-gold fusilier, Caesio caerulaurea Lacepède, 1801 (Port Elizabeth to Mozambique)
- Lunar fusilier, Caesio lunaris Ehrenberg, 1830 (Red Sea south to Natal)
- Beautiful fusilier, Caesio teres Seale, 1906 (Sodwana Bay to Kenya)
- Yellowback fusilier, Caesio xanthonota Bleeker, 1853 (Indian Ocean south to Sodwana Bay)
- Dark-banded fusilier, Pterocaesio tile Cuvier, 1830 (East Africa south to Sodwana Bay, juvenile found at Haga Haga just north of East London)

Family: Cepolidae – Bandfishes

- Bandfish, Acanthocepola indica (Day, 1888) (Occasionally taken by trawl in coastal waters from Natal to Japan)
- Owstonia weberi (Gilchrist, 1922) (Natal to Kenya)

Family: Dinopercidae

- Cavebass, Dinoperca petersi (Day, 1875) (Port Elizabeth to Mozambique)

Family: Emmelichthyidae – Rovers

- Southern rover, Emmelichthys nitidus Richardson 1845 (occasionally taken off western Cape coast)
- Japanese rubyfish, Erythrocles schlegelii (Richardson, 1846) (one specimen from off Durban)
- Rubyfish, Plagiogeneion rubiginosum (Hutton, 1875) (off Algoa Bay, off Vema Seamount)

Family: Gerreidae – Pursemouths

- Threadfin pursemouth, Gerres filamentosus Cuvier, 1829 (Indo-Pacific south to Algoa Bay)
- Smallscale pursemouth, Gerres longirostris (Lacepède, 1801) (Port Elizabeth to Mozambique)(syn. Gerres acinaces)
- Oblong pursemouth or slender silver-biddy, Gerres oblongus Cuvier, 1830 (Tropical Indo-Pacific south to Kosi Bay)
- Slenderspine pursemouth or common silver-biddy, Gerres oyena (Forsskål, 1775) (Tropical Indo-Pacific south to Kosi Bay)
- Evenfin pursemouth or striped silverbiddy, Gerres methueni Regan, 1920, recorded as syn. Gerres rappi (Barnard, 1927) (Algoa Bay to southern Mozambique)

Family: Haemulidae – Rubberlips and grunters

- Sailfin rubberlip or painted sweetlips, Diagramma pictum (Thunberg, 1792) (Indo-West Pacific to south Natal)
- Dusky rubberlip, Plectorhinchus chubbi (Regan, 1919) (Transkei to Kenya and India)
- Lemonfish, Plectorhinchus flavomaculatus (Ehrenberg, 1830) (Transkei to Red Sea)
- Blackspotted rubberlip, Plectorhinchus gaterinus (Forsskål, 1775) (Natal to Red Sea)
- Harry hotlips, Plectorhinchus gibbosus (Lacepède, 1802) (Indo-West Pacific, south to Natal)
- Barred rubberlip, Plectorhinchus plagiodesmus Fowler, 1935 (Somalia to Madagascar and Natal)
- Whitebarred rubberlip, Plectorhinchus playfairi (Pellegrin, 1914) (Western Indian Ocean to Port St. Johns)
- Minstrel, Plectorhinchus schotaf (Forsskål, 1775) (Indo-West Pacific south to Port St. Johns)
- Redlip rubberlip, Plectorhinchus sordidus (Klunzinger, 1870) (Red Sea to Transkei)
- Spotted grunter, Pomadasys commersonnii (Lacepède, 1801) (False Bay to India)
- Grey grunter, Pomadasys furcatus (Bloch and Schneider, 1801) (Madagascar to Natal, rare south of Durban)
- Javelin grunter, Pomadasys kaakan (Cuvier, 1830) (Indo-Pacific south to Transkei)
- Saddle grunter, Pomadasys maculatus (Bloch, 1797) (Indo-West Pacific south to Transkei)
- Cock grunter, Pomadasys multimaculatus (Playfair, 1866) (Algoa Bay to Zanzibar)
- Pinky or piggy, Pomadasys olivaceus (Day, 1875) (Cape Agulhas to Mozambique)
- Striped grunter, Pomadasys striatus (Gilchrist and Thompson, 1908) (Knysna to Beira)
- Lined piggy, Pomadasys stridens (Forsskål, 1775) (Red Sea to Natal)

Family: Labridae – Wrasses

- Bluespotted tamarin or blue-spotted wrasse, Anampses caeruleopunctatus Rüppell, 1829 (Red Sea to Algoa Bay)
- Lined tamarin or lined wrasse, Anampses lineatus Randall, 1972 (Red Sea south to Natal)
- Yellowtail tamarin or spotted wrasse, Anampses meleagrides Valenciennes, 1840 (Red Sea south to Sodwana Bay)
- Natal wrasse, Anchichoerops natalensis (Gilchrist & Thompson, 1908) (Known only from Natal and Transkei)
- Lyretail hogfish, Bodianus anthioides (Bennett, 1830) (Red Sea south to Sodwana Bay)
- Turncoat hogfish, Bodianus axillaris (Bennett, 1831) (Indo-Pacific south to Natal)
- Saddleback hogfish, Bodianus bilunulatus (Lacepède, 1801) (Indo-Pacific south to Durban)
- Diana's hogfish, Bodianus diana (Lacepède, 1801) (Port Elizabeth northwards)(Indo-Pacific south to Transkei)
- Lined hogfish, Bodianus leucosticticus (Bennett, 1831) (Somalia south to Natal)
- Goldsaddle hogfish, Bodianus perditio (Quoy & Gaimard, 1834) (Northern Mozambique to Natal)
- Floral wrasse, Cheilinus chlorourus (Bloch, 1791) (Indo-Pacific south to Sodwana Bay)
- Snooty wrasse, Cheilinus oxycephalus (Bleeker, 1853) (Indo-Pacific south to Natal)
- Tripletail wrasse, Cheilinus trilobatus Lacepéde, 1801 (Indo-Pacific south to Sodwana Bay)
- Cigar wrasse, Cheilio inermis (Forsskål, 1775) (Red sea south to Transkei)
- Exquisite wrasse, Cirrhilabrus exquisitus Smith, 1957 (East Africa south to Sodwana Bay)
- Clown coris, Coris aygula Lacepéde, 1801 (Indo-Pacific south to Transkei)
- Spottail coris Coris caudimacula (Quoy & Gaimard, 1834) (Red Sea south to East London)
- Queen coris, Coris formosa (Bennett, 1830) (Indian Ocean south to Durban)
- African coris, Coris cuvieri (Bennett, 1831), recorded as syn. Coris gaimard africana Smith, 1957 (Western Indian Ocean to 30°S)
- Knife wrasse, Cymolutes praetextatus (Quoy & Gaimard, 1834) (Indo-Pacific south to Natal)
- Birdfish, Gomphosus caeruleus Lacepède, 1801 (Port Alfred northwards)(Indian Ocean south to southern Natal)
- Adorned wrasse, Halichoeres cosmetus Randall and Smith, 1982 (Western Indian Ocean south to Aliwal Shoal)
- Bubblefin wrasse, Halichoeres nigrescens (Bloch & Schneider, 1801), recorded as syn. Halichoeres dussumieri (Valenciennes, 1839) (Indo-West Pacific south to Durban)
- Checkerboard wrasse, Halichoeres hortulanus (Lacepède, 1801) (Indo-Pacific south to Sodwana Bay)
- Rainbow wrasse, Halichoeres iridis Randall & Smith 1982 (East African coast to Natal (30°S))
- Jewelled wrasse, Halichoeres lapillus Smith, 1947 (Mauritius, Madagascar and southern Mozambique to Natal)
- Picture wrasse or nebulous wrasse, Halichoeres nebulosus (Valenciennes, 1839) (Indo-West Pacific south to Algoa Bay)
- Zigzag sand wrasse, Halichoeres scapularis(Bennett, 1831) (Red Sea to Natal)
- Ringed wrasse, Hologymnosus doliatus (Lacepéde, 1801) (Central Pacific to East Africa and south to southern Natal)
- Bicoloured cleaner wrasse, Labroides bicolor Fowler and Bean, 1928 (Indo-Pacific south to Natal)
- Bluestreak cleaner wrasse, Labroides dimidiatus (Valenciennes, 1839) (Indo-Pacific south to Algoa Bay)
- Divided wrasse, Macropharyngodon bipartitus Smith, 1957 (Western Indian Ocean south to Natal)
- Bluespotted wrasse, Macropharyngodon cyanoguttatus Randall, 1978 (Known only from Mauritius, Reunion and north coast of Natal)
- Madagascar wrasse, Macropharyngodon vivienae Randall, 1978 (Known only from Madagascar and Natal coast south to Durban)
- Seagrass wrasse, Novaculoides macrolepidotus (Bloch, 1791), recorded as syn. Novaculichthys macrolepidotus (Bloch 1791), (Red Sea south to Durban)
- Rockmover wrasse Novaculichthys taeniourus (Lacepéde, 1801) (Indo-Pacific south to Natal)
- Two-spot wrasse, Oxycheilinus bimaculatus (Valenciennes, 1840), recorded as syn. Cheilinus bimaculatus Valenciennes, 1840 (Indo-Pacific south to Sodwana Bay)
- Cheek-lined wrasse, Oxycheilinus digramma (Lacepède, 1801), recorded as Cheilinus digrammus (Lacepède, 1801) (Red Sea south to Natal)
- Striated wrasse, Pseudocheilinus evanidus (Jenkins, 1901) (Indo-Pacific south to Natal)
- Sixstripe wrasse or six-line wrasse, Pseudocheilinus hexataenia (Bleeker, 1857) (Indo-Pacific south to Natal)
- Eightstripe wrasse or eight-lined wrasse, Pseudocheilinus octotaenia Jenkins, 1900 (Indo-Pacific south to Natal)
- Chiseltooth wrasse, Pseudodax moluccanus (Valenciennes, 1839) (Indo-Pacific south to Sodwana Bay)
- Smalltail wrasse, Pseudojuloides cerasinus (Snyder, 1904) (Indo-Pacific south to Sodwana Bay)
- Cocktail wrasse, Pteragogus flagellifer (Valenciennes, 1839) (Indian Ocean south to Natal)
- Sideburn wrasse, Pteragogus pelycus Randall, 1981 (Western Indian Ocean south to Durban)
- Bluelined wrasse, Stethojulis albovittata Bonnaterre, 1788 (Red Sea to Natal)
- Cutribbon wrasse, Stethojulis interrupta (Bleeker, 1851) (Western Pacific to East Africa and south to Algoa Bay)
- Three-ribbon wrasse, Stethojulis strigiventer (Bennett, 1832) (Central Pacific to east Africa and south to Algoa Bay)
- Twotone wrasse, Thalassoma amblycephalum (Bleeker, 1856) (Indo-Pacific south to Transkei)
- Red-cheek wrasse, Thalassoma genivittatum (Valenciennes, 1839) (Mauritius and Natal, where it is known from Aliwal Shoal)
- Sixbar wrasse, Thalassoma hardwicke (Bennett, 1828) (Indo-Pacific south to Bashee River)
- Goldbar wrasse, Thalassoma hebraicum (Lacepède, 1801) (Indian Ocean south to Algoa Bay)
- Crescent-tail wrasse or moon wrasse, Thalassoma lunare (Linnaeus, 1758) Indo-Pacific south to Algoa Bay)
- Rainbow wrasse or surge wrasse, Thalassoma purpureum (Forsskål, 1775) (Indo-Pacific south to Algoa Bay)
- Fivestripe wrasse, Thalassoma quinquevittatum (Lay and Bennett, 1839) (Indo-Pacific south to Transkei (32°S))
- Ladder wrasse or Christmas wrasse, Thalassoma trilobatum (Lacepéde, 1801) (Indo-Pacific south to Transkei)
- Pearly razorfish, Xyrichtys novacula (Linnaeus, 1758) (Both sides of the Atlantic, 1 doubtful record from Cape of Good Hope)
- Peacock wrasse, Iniistius pavo (Valenciennes, 1840), recorded as syn. Xyrichtys pavo Valenciennes, 1840 (Red sea to Natal)
- Fivefinger wrasse, Iniistius pentadactylus (Linnaeus, 1758), recorded as syn. Xyrichtys pentadactylus (Linnaeus 1758), (Red Sea to Natal)

Family: Lethrinidae – Emperors

- Glowfish, Gnathodentex aureolineatus (Lacepède, 1802) (Indo-West Pacific to Durban)
- Grey barenose, Gymnocranius griseus (Temminck & Schlegel, 1843) (Indo-West Pacific south to Natal)
- Rippled barenose, Gymnocranius grandoculis (Valenciennes, 1830), recorded as syn. Gymnocranius robinsoni (Gilchrist & Thompson, 1908) (Indo-West Pacific south to Sodwana Bay)
- Yellowfin emperor, Lethrinus crocineus (Smith, 1959) (Western Indian Ocean south to Natal)
- Longnose emperor, Lethrinus microdon Valenciennes, 1830, recorded as syn. Lethrinus elongatus Valenciennes, 1830, (Indo-West Pacific south to Natal)
- Blackspot emperor, Lethrinus harak (Forsskål, 1775) (Indo-West Pacific south to Natal)
- Redspot emperor, Lethrinus lentjan (Lacepède, 1802) (Indo-West Pacific south to Sodwana Bay)
- Sky emperor, Lethrinus mahsena (Forsskål, 1775) (Indo-West Pacific south to Sodwana Bay)
- Snubnose emperor, Lethrinus lentjan (Lacepède, 1802), recorded as syn. Lethrinus mahsenoides Valenciennes, 1830 (Indo-West Pacific south to Sodwana Bay)
- Blue emperor, Lethrinus nebulosus (Forsskål, 1775) (Indo-West Pacific to Algoa Bay)
- Orange striped emperor, Lethrinus obsoletus (Forsskål, 1775), recorded as syn. Lethrinus ramak (Forsskål, 1775) (Indo-West Pacific to Natal)
- Spotcheek emperor, Lethrinus rubrioperculatus Sato, 1978 (Indo-West Pacific south to Natal)
- Cutthroat emperor, Lethrinus mahsena (Forsskål, 1775), recorded as syn. Lethrinus sanguineus Smith, 1955 (Western Indian Ocean south to Sodwana Bay)
- Variegated emperor, Lethrinus variegatus Ehrenberg, 1830 (Indo-West Pacific south to Natal)
- Bigeye barenose, Monotaxis grandoculis (Forsskål, 1775) (Indo-Pacific south to Natal)

Family: Lutjanidae – Snappers

- Blue smalltooth job, Aphareus furca (Forsskål, 1775) (Tropical Indo-Pacific to Sodwana Bay)
- Red smalltooth job, Aphareus rutilans Cuvier, 1830 (Tropical Indo-Pacific south to Durban)
- Kaakap or green jobfish, Aprion virescens Valenciennes, 1830 (Central KwaZulu-Natal to Mozambique)
- Ruby snapper, Etelis coruscans Valenciennes, 1862 (Tropical/subtropical Indo-Pacific south to Bashee River)
- River snapper, Lutjanus argentimaculatus (Forsskål, 1775) (Red sea and tropical Indo-Pacific south to East London)
- Twinspot snapper, Lutjanus bohar (Forsskål, 1775) (Red Sea and tropical Indo-West Pacific south to Durban)
- Blackspot snapper, Lutjanus ehrenbergii (Peters, 1869) (Red Sea and tropical Indo-West pacific south to Natal)
- Dory snapper, Lutjanus fulviflamma (Forsskål, 1775) (Red Sea and tropical Indo-West Pacific south to East London)
- Yellow striped snapper, Lutjanus fulvus (Schneider, 1801) (Tropical Indo-West Pacific south to Bashee River)
- Humpback snapper, Lutjanus gibbus (Forsskål, 1775) (Red Sea and tropical Indo-West Pacific south to Durban)
- Bluebanded snapper, Lutjanus kasmira (Forsskål, 1775) (Red Sea and tropical Indo-West Pacific south to East London)
- Sweetlip snapper, Lutjanus lemniscatus (Valenciennes, 1828) (Tropical Indian Ocean to Durban)
- Bluestriped snapper, Lutjanus notatus (Cuvier, 1828) (East African coast south to Durban)
- Speckled snapper, Lutjanus rivulatus (Cuvier, 1828) (Tropical Indo-West Pacific south to Durban)
- Russell's snapper, Lutjanus russellii (Bleeker, 1849) (Central KwaZulu-Natal to Mozambique)
- Blood snapper, Lutjanus sanguineus (Cuvier, 1828) (Western Indian Ocean south to Algoa Bay)
- Emperor snapper, Lutjanus sebae (Cuvier, 1816) (Tropical Indo-West Pacific south to Durban)
- Black beauty, Macolor niger (Forsskål, 1775) (Tropical Indo-Pacific south to Sodwana Bay, 1 juvenile from Durban)
- Yellowtail fuselier, Paracaesio xanthura (Bleeker, 1869) (Tropical Indo-West Pacific south to Durban)
- Rosy jobfish, Pristipomoides filamentosus (Day, 1870) (Tropical Indo-Pacific south to East London)

Family: Malacanthidae – Tilefishes

- Ribbed tilefish, Branchiostegus doliatus (Cuvier, 1830) (Durban to Maputo)
- Spotted tilefish, Branchiostegus sawakinensis Amirthalingam, 1969 (Off Durban; Red sea)
- Forktail tilefish, Hoplolatilus fronticinctus (Günther, 1887) (Postlarvae collected off Cape Peninsula; India and Western Pacific)
- Stripetail filefish, Malacanthus brevirostris Guichenot, 1848 (Tropical Indo-Pacific south to Sodwana Bay. Postlarvae drift to near Port Alfred)

Family: Monodactylidae – Moonies

- Natal moony, Monodactylus argenteus (Linnaeus, 1758) (Red Sea to Cape Infanta)
- Cape moony, Monodactylus falciformis Lacepède, 1801 (Red Sea to False Bay)

Family: Nemipteridae – Butterfly breams, spinecheeks

- Silverflash spinecheek, Scolopsis vosmeri (Bloch, 1792) (Tropical Indo-West Pacific south to Durban)

Family: Priacanthidae – Bigeyes

- Bulleye or glass bigeye, Heteropriacanthus cruentatus (Lacepède, 1801), also recorded as syn. Cookeolus boops Schneider, 1801 (Algoa Bay to Beira)
- Crescent-tail bigeye, Priacanthus hamrur (Forsskål, 1775) (Knysna to Mozambique)
- Japanese bigeye, Pristigenys niphonia (Cuvier, 1829) (Indian Ocean south to Algoa Bay)

Family: Scaridae – Parrotfishes

- Christmas parrotfish, Calotomus carolinus (Valenciennes, 1840) (Eastern Pacific to Natal)
- Blue moon parrotfish, Chlorurus atrilunula (Randall & Bruce, 1983), recorded as syn. Scarus atrilunula Randall and Bruce, 1983 (Kenya to Natal)
- Blue humphead parrotfish, Chlorurus cyanescens (Valenciennes, 1840) (Mauritius, Madagascar, Zanzibar and Natal to 30°S)(syn. Scarus cyanescens)
- Bullethead parrotfish, Chlorurus sordidus (Forsskål, 1775), recorded as syn. Scarus sordidus Forsskål, 1775 (Indo-Pacific south to Natal)
- Marbled parrotfish, Leptoscarus vaigiensis (Quoy and Gaimard, 1824) (East Africa south to Transkei)
- Redbarred parrotfish, Scarus caudofasciatus (Günther, 1862) (Western Indian Ocean to Sodwana Bay)
- Lunate parrotfish, Scarus festivus Valenciennes, 1840 (French Polynesia to east Africa; observed off Sodwana Bay)
- Bluebarred parrotfish, Scarus ghobban Forsskål, 1775 (Red sea to Algoa Bay)
- Roundhead parrotfish, Scarus globiceps Valenciennes, 1840 (Indo-Pacific south to Sodwana Bay)
- Dusky parrotfish, Scarus niger Forsskål, 1775 (Indo-Pacific south to Sodwana Bay)
- Palenose parrotfish, Scarus psittacus Forsskål, 1775 (Red Sea south to Sodwana Bay)
- Ember parrotfish, Scarus rubroviolaceus Bleeker, 1847 (Eastern Pacific to Durban)
- Eclipse parrotfish, Scarus russelii (Tropical and subtropical Indian Ocean from India westwards but not Persian Gulf or Red Sea. One specimen from Sodwana Bay)
- Fivesaddle parrotfish, Scarus scaber Valenciennes, 1840 (East Africa south to Natal)
- Tricolour parrotfish, Scarus tricolor Bleeker, 1847 (East Africa south to Natal)

Family: Sciaenidae – Kobs

- Kob or giant kob or kabeljou, Argyrosomus japonicus (Temminck & Schlegel, 1843) (Namibia to Natal) previously misidentified as Argyrosomus hololepidotus (Lacepède, 1801)
- Squaretail kob, Argyrosomus thorpei Smith, 1977 (Algoa Bay to Tugela River)
- Geelbek, Atractoscion aequidens (Cuvier, 1830) (Angola to northern KwaZulu-Natal)
- Longfin kob, Atrobucca nibe (Jordan and Thompson, 1911) (Natal)
- Bellfish or small kob, Johnius amblycephalus (Bleeker, 1855), also recorded as syn. Johnius dussumieri (Cuvier, 1830) (Indo-West Pacific to Algoa Bay)
- Snapper kob, Otolithes ruber (Bloch & Schneider, 1801) (Indo-West Pacific south to Durban)
- Baardman or belman, Umbrina canariensis Valenciennes, 1843 (Morocco to the Cape of Good Hope through to Pakistan)
- Slender baardman, Umbrina ronchus Valenciennes, 1843 (KwaZulu-Natal)

Family: Sillaginidae – Sillagos

- Clubfoot sillago, Sillaginopodys chondropus (Bleeker, 1849), recorded as syn. Sillago chondropus Bleeker, 1849 (Indo-West Pacific south to Durban)
- Blotchy sillago, Sillago maculata Quoy and Gaimard, 1824 (China to South Africa)
- Silver smelt or silver sillago, Sillago sihama (Forsskål, 1775) (Indo-West Pacific south to Knysna)

Family: Sparidae – Seabreams

- River bream, Acanthopagrus berda (Forsskål, 1775) (Tropical Indo-Pacific south to Knysna)
- Two-bar seabream, Acanthopagrus bifasciatus (Forsskål, 1775) (Red Sea to Natal)
- Soldier bream, Argyrops filamentosus (Valenciennes, 1830) (Red Sea to Natal)
- King soldierbream, Argyrops spinifer (Forsskål, 1775) (Tropical Indo-West Pacific south to Knysna))
- Carpenter, Argyrozona argyrozona (Valenciennes, 1830) (Cape Columbine to central KwaZulu-Natal)
- Fransmadam, Boopsoidea inornata Castelnau, 1861 (Cape Columbine to central KwaZulu-Natal)
- Santer, Cheimerius nufar (Valenciennes, 1830) (Mossel Bay to Mozambique)
- Englishman, Chrysoblephus anglicus (Gilchrist & Thompson, 1908) (Port Elizabeth to Mozambique)
- Dageraad, Chrysoblephus cristiceps (Valenciennes, 1830) (Cape Point to Durban)
- Red stumpnose or Miss Lucy, Chrysoblephus gibbiceps (Valenciennes, 1830) (Cape Point to East London)
- Roman, Chrysoblephus laticeps (Valenciennes, 1830) (Cape Point to southern KwaZulu-Natal)(Cape to Mauritius)
- False Englishman, Chrysoblephus lophus (Fowler, 1925) (Transkei to Northern KwaZulu-Natal)(Natal)
- Slinger, Chrysoblephus puniceus (Gilchrist & Thompson, 1908) (Knysna to Mozambique)
- White karanteen, Crenidens crenidens (Forsskål, 1775) (Red Sea to East London)
- Poenskop or black musselcracker, Cymatoceps nasutus (Castelnau, 1861) (Cape Columbine to Durban)
- Blacktail, Diplodus capensis (Smith, 1844) (Angola to Madagascar) (syn. Diplodus sargus capensis)
- Zebra, Diplodus hottentotus (Smith, 1844) recorded as syn. Diplodus cervinus hottentotus (Smith, 1844) (Cape Point to Sodwana Bay)
- Janbruin, Gymnocrotaphus curvidens Günther, 1859 (Cape Point to Durban)
- West coast steenbras, Lithognathus aureti Smith, 1962 (West coast; Cape Town to Angola)
- White steenbras, Lithognathus lithognathus (Cuvier, 1829) (Orange River to Durban)
- Sand steenbras, Lithognathus mormyrus (Linnaeus, 1758)(Mediterranean to the Cape of Good Hope and round to Mozambique)
- Blue hottentot, Pachymetopon aeneum (Gilchrist & Thompson, 1908) (Cape Point to Sodwana Bay)
- Hottentot, Pachymetopon blochii (Valenciennes, 1830) (Angola to Cape Agulhas)
- Bronze bream, Pachymetopon grande Günther, 1859 (Mossel Bay to Mozambique)(Cape to Madagascar)
- Red tjor-tjor or sand soldier, Pagellus natalensis Steindachner, 1903 (Mossel Bay to Madagascar)(syn. Pagellus bellottii natalensis)
- Red steenbras, Petrus rupestris (Valenciennes, 1830) (Cape Point to Durban)
- German, Polyamblyodon germanum (Barnard, 1934) (East London to Maputo)
- Christie, Polyamblyodon gibbosum (Pellegrin) (Natal to Beira)
- Blueskin, Polysteganus coeruleopunctatus Klunzinger, 1870 (Red Sea to Natal south coast)
- Scotsman, Polysteganus praeorbitalis (Günther, 1859) (Port Elizabeth to Beira)
- Seventy-four, Polysteganus undulosus (Regan, 1908) (Port Elizabeth to Maputo)(Cape of Good Hope to Delagoa Bay)
- Dane, Porcostoma dentata (Gilchrist & Thompson, 1908) (Central KwaZulu-Natal to Mozambique)(Knysna to Beira)
- Panga, Pterogymnus laniarius (Valenciennes, 1830) (Cape Point to Transkei)(Cape to Beira)
- White stumpnose, Rhabdosargus globiceps (Valenciennes, 1830) (Namibia to East London)(Angola to Natal)
- Cape stumpnose, Rhabdosargus holubi (Steindachner, 1881) (Cape Agulhas to Maputo)(Cape to Natal)
- Natal stumpnose, Rhabdosargus sarba (Forsskål, 1775) (Port Elizabeth to Mozambique)(Red sea to Knysna)
- Bigeye stumpnose, Rhabdosargus thorpei Smith, 1979 (Durban to southern Mozambique)
- Strepie, Sarpa salpa (Linnaeus, 1758) (Cape Columbine to Maputo)(Mediterranean and eastern Atlantic round South Africa to southern Mozambique)
- Musselcracker, Sparodon durbanensis (Castelnau, 1861) (Cape Columbine to Durban)
- Picarel, Spicara australe (Regan, 1921) (Known only from off Natal)
- Windtoy, Spicara axillare (Boulanger, 1900) (Known only from Cape Town to Natal)
- Steentjie, Spondyliosoma emarginatum (Valenciennes, 1830) (Saldanha Bay to Durban) Spondyliosoma emarginatum

==== Order Gadiformes ====
Family: Bregmacerotidae – Codlets

- Antenna codlet, Bregmaceros atlanticus Goode and Bean, 1886 (Off south Cape and Natal coasts; Circumtropical)
- Bregmaceros macclellandii Thompson, 1840 (from Cape eastwards; circumtropical but not known from east Pacific)
- Bregmaceros nectabanus Whitley, 1941 (Cape eastwards to tropical Indo-West Pacific; Tropical eastern Atlantic)

Family: Lotidae – Lings and rocklings

- Cape rockling, Gaidropsarus capensis (Kaup, 1858) (Cape Town to East London)
- Comb rockling, Gaidropsarus insularum Sivertsen, 1945 (Cape Peninsula and West coast)

Family: Macrouridae – Grenadiers

- Bathygadus favosus Goode and Bean, 1886 (off Cape Town)
- Bathygadus melanobranchus Vaillant, 1888 (Table Bay and Natal coast. Unverified, specimens missing)
- Bathygadus sp. (cf. favosus Goode and Bean) (Mozambique and Agulhas Bank)
- Coelorinchus acanthiger Barnard, 1925 (off Namibia to Cape Point)
- Coelorinchus braueri Barnard, 1925 (Saldanha and Table Bay, Cape Point, East London; Angola to Mozambique)
- Coelorinchus denticulatus Regan, 1921 (Natal coast to Tanzania)
- Coelorinchus fasciatus (Günther, 1878) (off south coast)
- Coelorinchus flabellispinis (Alcock, 1894) (Indian Ocean. Specimens from southern Africa differ somewhat from those off India and may be a different species)
- Mahia whiptail, Coelorinchus matamua (McCann & McKnight, 1980) (apparently abundant off South Africa, also found off New Zealand and southern Australia) (syn. Mahia matamua McCann and McKnight, 1980)
- Abyssal grenadier, Coryphaenoides armatus (Hector, 1875) (abyssal, all oceans except Arctic. One Atlantic record off South Africa)
- Coryphaenoides striaturus Barnard, 1925 (off Cape Point)
- Longrayed whiptail, Coryphaenoides subserrulatus Makushok, 1976 (Agulhas bank)
- Gadomus capensis (Gilchrist and von Bonde, 1924) (Table Bay to Mozambique)
- Macrourus holotrachys Günther, 1878 (Cape Point and Prince Edward Island; also off New Zealand and southwestern Australia)
- Kuronezumia leonis (Barnard, 1925), recorded as syn. Nezumia leonis(Barnard, 1925) (off Cape Point); Namibia; southwestern Atlantic)
- Lucigadus ori (Smith, 1968), recorded as syn. Ventrifossa ori (Smith, 1968) (off Agulhas bank, Durban and East London)
- Malacocephalus laevis (Lowe, 1843) (off South Africa; widespread in Atlantic and Indian oceans)
- Mesovagus antipodum (Hubbs & Iwamoto, 1977), recorded as syn. Mesobius antipodum Hubbs and Iwamoto, 1977 (off south coast of SA; New Zealand, eastern Indian Ocean and Madagascar plateau)
- Nezumia brevibarbata (Barnard, 1925) (Cape Point; Known only off the Cape, where it is common)
- Trachyrincus scabrus (Rafinesque, 1810) (Namibia, west coast of South Africa; eastern North Atlantic and Mediterranean sea)
- Ventrifossa aff. divergens Gilbert and Hubbs, 1920 (off East London, Durban, Natal and southern Mozambique)
- Ventrifossa nasuta (Smith, 1935) (Durban to Mozambique)

Family: Melanonidae – Melanonids

- Pelagic cod, Melanonus gracilis Günther, 1878 (Circum-Antarctic south of Subtropical convergence; off Cape Peninsula)

Family: Merlucciidae – Hakes

- Lyconodes argenteus (Gilchrist, 1922) (west of Cape of Good Hope)
- Straptail or cape grenadier or South African straptail, Macruronus capensis Davies, 1950 (off Algoa Bay)
- Shallow water hake, Merluccius capensis Castelnau, 1861 (Namibia to East London)
- Deep water hake, Merluccius paradoxus Franca, 1960 (Cape Frio to East London)

Family: Moridae – Deepsea cods

- Blue antimora, Antimora rostrata (Günther, 1878) (Locally abundant, found in most oceans)
- Guttigadus globiceps (Gilchrist, 1906), recorded as syn. Laemonema globiceps Gilchrist, 1906 (off south-western Cape coast)
- Laemonema compressicauda (Gilchrist, 1904) (2 small specimens off Transkei)
- Lepidion capensis Gilchrist, 1922 (Cape to East London)
- Lepidion natalensis Gilchrist, 1922 (continental slope off Natal)
- Physiculus capensis Gilchrist, 1922 (Cape Peninsula to East London)
- Physiculus natalensis Gilchrist, 1922 (upper slope off Natal)
- Grenadier cod, Tripterophycis gilchristi Boulenger, 1902 (upper slope off the Cape and Durban)

==== Order Gobiesociformes ====
Family: Gobiesocidae – Clingfishes

- Chubby clingfish, Apletodon pellegrini (Chabanaud, 1925) (Senegal (west Africa) to Port Alfred)
- Rocksucker, Chorisochismus dentex (Pallas, 1769) (Port Nolloth to northern KwaZulu-Natal)
- Bigeye clingfish, Diplecogaster megalops Briggs, 1955 (False Bay to Durban)
- Weedsucker, Eckloniaichthys scylliorhiniceps Smith, 1943 (Lüderitz to Kei River mouth)
- Pale clingfish, Lepadichthys caritus Briggs, 1969 (Sodwana Bay to Seychelles)
- Eyestripe clingfish, Lepadichthys coccinotaenia Regan, 1921 (Southern KwaZulu-Natal (31°S) to Tanzania)
- Doubleline clingfish, Lepadichthys lineatus Briggs, 1966 (Sodwana Bay and Red sea)
- Mini-clingfish, Pherallodus smithi Briggs, 1955 (Durban)

==== Order Gobiiformes ====
Family: Eleotridae – Sleepers

- Duckbill sleeper or crazy fish, Butis butis (Hamilton, 1822) (Tropical Indo-West pacific south to Mgeni Beachwood estuary)
- Blackspot sleeper, Butis melanostigma (Bleeker, 1849) (Port St Johns. Also tropical western Pacific)
- Dusky sleeper, Eleotris fusca (Forster, 1801) (Tropical Indo-West Pacific south to Coffee Bay)
- Widehead sleeper, Eleotris mauritiana (Bennett, 1832) (Umtata River to Mozambique)
- Broadhead sleeper, Eleotris melanosoma Bleeker, 1853 (Tropical Indo-West Pacific south to Qora River)
- Golden sleeper, Hypseleotris cyprinoides (Valenciennes, 1837), recorded as syn, Hypseleotris dayi Smith, 1950 (Fresh and brackish water, St. Lucia and Empangeni, Natal)
- Flathead sleeper, Ophiocara porocephala (Valenciennes, 1837) (Durban to Shimoni)

Family: Gobiidae – Gobies

Subfamily: Amblyopinae

- Bulldog eelgoby, Taenioides esquivel Smith, 1946 (Delagoa Bay to Transkei)
- Bearded eelgoby, Taenioides jacksoni Smith, 1943 (Estuaries of Natal)
- Comb goby, Paratrypauchen microcephalus (Bleeker, 1860), recorded as syn. Trypauchen microcephalus Bleeker, 1860 (Indo-West Pacific south to Natal)

Subfamily: Gobiinae

- Mangrove goby, Acentrogobius audax Smith, 1959 (Natal)
- Shadow goby, Acentrogobius nebulosus (Forsskål, 1775), recorded as syn. Yongeichthys nebulosus (Forsskål, 1775). (Western tropical Pacific and Indian oceans south to Durban)
- Pinkbar goby, Amblyeleotris aurora (Polunin & Lubbock, 1977) (Islands of western Indian Ocean from Maldives southwards and northern Natal)
- Gorgeous goby, gorgeous prawn goby, Amblyeleotris wheeleri (Polunin & Lubbock, 1977) (Indo-West Pacific south to Sodwana Bay)
- Butterfly goby, Amblygobius albimaculatus (Rüppell, 1830) (Read sea south to Durban)
- Starryfin goby, Asterropteryx semipunctata Rüppell, 1830 (Ind-Pacific south to Durban)
- Bearded goby, cryptic bearded goby, Barbuligobius boehlkei Lachler & McKinney, 1974 (Tropical Indo-West Pacific south to Sodwana Bay)
- Whitespotted goby, Bathygobius coalitus (Bennett, 1832), recorded as syn. Bathygobius albopunctatus (Valenciennes, 1837), (Inhaca south to Transkei)
- Cocos frillgoby, Bathygobius cocosensis (Bleeker, 1854) (Indo-Pacific south to Transkei)
- Cheekscaled frillgoby, Bathygobius cotticeps (Steindachner, 1880) (Indo-Pacific south to Coffee Bay)
- Spotted frillgoby, Bathygobius cyclopterus (Valenciennes, 1837) (Tropical Indo-West Pacific south to Transkei)
- Brownboy goby, Bathygobius laddi (Fowler, 1931) (Inhaca to Coffee Bay)
- Black minigoby, Bathygobius niger (Smith, 1960) (Transkei to Natal, also India and Sri-Lanka)
- Brownlined goby, Bathygobius sp. (Indo-West Pacific south to Xora River)
- Agulhas goby, Caffrogobius agulhensis (Barnard, 1927) (False Bay to East London)
- Banded goby, Caffrogobius caffer (Günther, 1874) (Natal to False Bay)
- Prison goby, Caffrogobius gilchristi (Boulenger, 1898), also recorded as syn. Caffrogobius multifasciatus (Smith, 1959), (Table Bay to Mozambique Island)
- Baldy, Caffrogobius natalensis (Günther, 1874) (Knysna to Natal)
- Barehead goby, Caffrogobius nudiceps (Valenciennes, 1827) (Walvis Bay to East London)
- Commafin goby, Caffrogobius saldanha (Barnard, 1927) (Saldanha Bay to southern Transkei)
- Pacific goby, Callogobius sclateri (Steindachner, 1880) (Sodwana Bay and tropical Pacific)
- Kaalpens goby, Coryogalops william (Smith, 1948), also recorded as syn. Monishia william (Smith, 1947), (Inhaca to Still Bay)
- Naked goby, Croilia mossambica Smith, 1955 (Southern Mozambique to south of Durban)
- Sailfin goby, Myersina pretoriusi (Smith, 1958), recorded as syn. Cryptocentrus pretoriusi Smith, 1958 (Known only from Pondoland)
- Blackthroat goby, Favonigobius melanobranchus (Fowler, 1934) (Indo-West Pacific south to Natal)
- Tropical sand goby, Favonigobius reichei Bleeker, 1953 (Indo-West Pacific south to Natal)
- Barenape goby, Fusigobius duospilus Hoese & Reader, 1985 (Indo-West Pacific south to Sodwana Bay)
- Longspine goby, Fusigobius longispinus Goren, 1978 (Kenya to Durban)
- Sleepy goby, Psammogobius biocellatus (Valenciennes, 1837), recorded as syn. Glossogobius biocellatus (Valenciennes, 1837) (Indo-Pacific south to East London)
- River goby, Glossogobius callidus (Smith, 1937) (Aldabra, Mozambique, south to Port Elizabeth)
- Tank goby, Glossogobius giuris (Hamilton, 1822) (Indo-West Pacific south to Port St. Johns)
- Rippled coralgoby, Gobiodon rivulatus (Rüppell) (Indo-West Pacific south to Sodwana Bay)
- Poreless goby, Hetereleotris apora (Hoese and Winterbottom, 1979) (Sodwana Bay)
- Smoothscale goby, Hetereleotris margaretae Hoese, 1986 (Known only from Sodwana Bay)
- Locusthead, Hetereleotris tentaculata (Seychelles and Sodwana Bay)
- Goggles, Hetereleotris zonata (Fowler, 1934) (Natal to Port Alfred)
- Decorated goby, Istigobius decoratus (Herre, 1927) (Indo-West Pacific south to Durban)
- Pearl goby, Istigobius spence (Smith, 1946) (Indo-West Pacific south to Sodwana Bay)
- Taileyed goby, Parachaeturichthys polynema (Bleeker, 1953) (Indo-West Pacific south to Natal)
- Redhead goby, Paragobiodon echinocephalus (Rüppell, 1830) (Indo-West Pacific, associated with Stylophora coral)
- Backfin goby, Paragobiodon lacunicolus (Kendall & Goldsborough, 1911) (Indo-Pacific)
- Emerald goby, Paragobiodon xanthosoma (Bleeker, 1852) (Indo-West Pacific, associated with the coral Seriatopora hystrix)
- Scalynape goby, Pleurosicya annandalei (Hornell & Fowler, 1922) (Sodwana Bay)
- Toothy goby, Pleurosicya mossambica (Smith, 1959) (Sodwana Bay, Mozambique, Seychelles and tropical Indo-West Pacific)
- Pleurosicya sp. 1 (Sodwana Bay, Seychelles, Chagos archipelago, tropical Indian Ocean and western tropical Pacific)
- Convict goby, Priolepis cincta (Regan, 1908) (Indo-West Pacific south to Natal)
- Sodwana goby, Priolepis sp. (Indo-West Pacific south to Sodwana Bay)
- Knysna sandgoby, Psammogobius knysnaensis Smith, 1935 (Port Nolloth to northern KwaZulu-Natal)
- Barebreast goby or sibayi goby, Silhouettea sibayi Farquharson, 1970 (Known only from Lake Sibayi and Kosi Bay)
- Pelagic goby, Sufflogobius bibarbatus (von Bonde, 1923) (Port Nolloth to Saldanha Bay)
- Polkadot goby, Trimma corallinum (Smith, 1969) (Phinda to Sodwana Bay)
- Flame goby, Trimma macrophthalmum (Tomiyama, 1936) (Indo-West Pacific south to Sodwana Bay)
- Pennant glider, Valenciennea strigata (Broussonet, 1787) (Indo-Pacific south to Sodwana Bay

Subfamily: Gobionellinae

- Freshwater goby, Awaous aeneofuscus (Peters, 1852) (Estuaries and freshwaters from Algoa Bay to Zambezi)
- Weeper, Gnatholepis sp. 1 (Western Indian Ocean south to Transkei)
- Slender weeper, Gnatholepis sp. 2 (Indo-Pacific south to Sodwana Bay)
- Durban goby, Mugilogobius durbanensis (Barnard, 1927) (Southern Mozambique to Coffee Bay)
- Meander goby, Mugilogobius mertoni (Weber, 1911), recorded as syn. Mugilogobius inhacae (Smith, 1959) (Southern Mozambique to Natal)
- Sharptail goby, Oligolepis acutipennis(Valenciennes, 1837) (Indo-West Pacific south to Great Fish River)
- Kei goby, Oxyurichthys keiensis (Smith, 1938), recorded as syn. Oligolepis keiensis (Smith, 1938) (Seychelles, Madagascar and Inhaca to Fish River Mouth)
- Maned goby, Oxyurichthys microlepis (Bleeker, 1849) (Indo-West Pacific south to Xora River mouth)
- Eyebrow goby, Oxyurichthys ophthalmonema (Bleeker, 1857) (Indo-West Pacific south to Xora River mouth)
- Dwarfgoby, Pandaka silvana (Barnard, 1943) (Northern Mozambique to Knysna)
- Bigmouth goby, Redigobius bikolanus (Herre, 1927) (Indo-Pacific south to Coffee Bay)
- Checked goby, Redigobius dewaali (Weber, 1897) (Freshwater and estuarine, Southern Mozambique to Knysna)

Subfamily: Oxudercinae

- African mudhopper or common mudskipper, Periophthalmus kalolo Lesson, 1831, also recorded as syn. Periophthalmus koelreuteri, (Seychelles, Kenya to Transkei)
- Bigfin mudhopper or barred mudskipper, Periophthalmus argentilineatus Valenciennes, 1837, also recorded as syn. Periophthalmus sobrinus Eggert, 1935, (Port Alfred to Red Sea)

Family: Microdesmidae – Gobies

Subfamily: Ptereleotrinae

- Fire goby, Nemateleotris magnifica Fowler, 1938 (Sodwana Bay and Comores to Marquesas islands)
- Scissortail, Ptereleotris evides (Jordan & Hubbs, 1925) (Red Sea south to Natal)
- Blacktail goby, Ptereleotris heteroptera (Bleeker, 1855) (Indo-Pacific south to Natal)
- Sad glider, Ptereleotris lineopinnis (Fowler, 1935) (Umzumbi, Natal, 1 specimen)

Family: Trichonotidae – Sand divers

- Sand diver, Trichonotus marleyi (Smith, 1936) (Known only from Durban to Delagoa Bay)

==== Order Gonorynchiformes ====
Family: Chanidae

- Milkfish, Chanos chanos (Forsskål, 1775) (Krom river to tropical Indo-West Pacific)

Family: Gonorynchidae – Beaked sandfish

- Beaked sandfish, Gonorynchus gonorynchus (Linnaeus 1766) (Cape of Good Hope)

==== Order Holocentriformes ====
Family: Holocentridae – Squirrelfishes and Soldierfishes

Subfamily: Holocentrinae – Squirrelfishes

- Spotfin squirrelfish, Neoniphon sammara (Forsskål, 1775) (Tropical Indo-Pacific south to Durban)
- Tailspot squirrelfish, Sargocentron caudimaculatum (Rüppell, 1838) (Red sea and Indo-Pacific south to Xora river mouth, Transkei)
- Crown squirrelfish, Sargocentron diadema (Lacepède, 1802) (Durban to Mozambique) (Indo-Pacific south to East London)
- Dark-striped squirrelfish, Sargocentron praslin (Lacepède, 1802) (Indo-West Pacific reported by Smith to reach Durban, but no specimens available from south of Mozambique)
- Speckled squirrelfish, Sargocentron punctatissimum (Cuvier, 1829) (Indo-Pacific south to Algoa Bay)
- Sabre squirrelfish, Sargocentron spiniferum (Forsskål, 1775) (Red sea and east coast of Africa south to Natal)

Subfamily: Myripristinae – Soldierfishes

- Shadowfin soldier, Myripristis adusta Bleeker, 1853 (Indo-Pacific south to Natal)
- Bigscale soldier or blotcheye soldierfish, Myripristis berndti Jordan and Evermann, 1903 (Indo-Pacific south to Natal)
- Pale soldier, Myripristis botche Cuvier, 1829, recorded as sym. Myripristis melanosticta Bleeker, 1863, (Indian ocean (Sri Lanka, Maldives and Sodwana Bay) to Japan and New Hebrides)
- Yellowfin soldier, Myripristis chryseres Jordan and Evermann, 1903 (Aliwal shoal)
- Epaulette soldier, Myripristis kuntee (Cuvier, 1831) (Indo-Pacific south to Natal)
- Blotcheye soldier, Myripristis murdjan (Forsskål, 1775) (Transkei to Mozambique)(Red Sea and Ind-Pacific south to Natal)
- Lattice soldier, Myripristis violacea Bleeker, 1851, (Indo-Pacific south to Natal)
- Shy soldier, Plectrypops lima (Valenciennes, 1831) (Indo-West Pacific south to Natal)

==== Order Kurtiformes ====
Family: Apogonidae – Cardinal fishes (see also Epigonidae)

Subfamily: Apogoninae

- Ruby cardinal, Apogon coccineus Rüppell, 1838 (Red Sea south to Durban)
- Threeband cardinal Apogon semiornatus Peters, 1876 (Indo-West Pacific south to Durban)
- Sad cardinal, Apogonichthyoides timorensis (Bleeker, 1854), recorded as syn. Apogon timorensis Bleeker, 1854 (Indo-West Pacific, Red Sea south to Sodwana Bay)
- Ocellated cardinal, Apogonichthys ocellatus (Weber, 1913) (Indo-West Pacific south to Coffee Bay)
- Speckled cardinal, Apogonichthys Bleeker, 1954 (Indo-West Pacific, Red Sea to Sodwana Bay)(check source)
- Tiger cardinal, Cheilodipterus macrodon (Lacepède, 1802), recorded as syn. Cheilodipterus lineatus Lacepède, 1801 (Sodwana Bay to Red Sea)
- Masked cardinal, Fibramia thermalis (Cuvier, 1829), recorded as syn. Apogon thermalis Cuvier, 1829 (Indo-West Pacific to southern Natal)
- Foa, Foa brachygramma (Jenkins, 1903) (Indo-Pacific south to Natal)
- Crosseyed cardinal, Fowleria aurita (Valenciennes, 1831) (Natal to Red Sea)
- Spotfin cardinal, Jaydia queketti (Gilchrist, 1903), recorded as syn. Apogon queketti Gilchrist, 1903, (Natal coast to southern Red Sea)
- Smallscale cardinal, Lepidamia multitaeniata (Cuvier, 1828), recorded as syn. Apogon multitaeniatus Ehrenberg, 1828 (Red Sea to Durban)
- Broadstriped cardinal, Ostorhinchus angustatus (Smith & Radcliffe, 1911), recorded as syn. Apogon angustatus (Smith and Radcliffe, 1911) (Red Sea to Natal)
- Diamond cardinal or short tooth cardinal, Ostorhinchus apogonoides (Bleeker, 1856), recorded as syn. Apogon apogonides (Bleeker, 1856) (Indo-Pacific south to Durban) and as syn. Apogon enigmaticus (Smith, 1961) (1 specimen off Durban)
- Bandtail cardinal oe ring-tailed cardinalfish, Ostorhinchus aureus (Lacepède, 1802), recorded as syn. Apogon aureus (Lacepède, 1802) (Red Sea south to Durban)
- Blackbanded cardinal, Ostorhinchus cookii (MacLeay, 1881), recorded as syn. Apogon cookii Macleay, 1881 (Western Indian Ocean south to Durban)
- Coachwhip cardinal, Ostorhinchus flagelliferus Smith, 1961, recorded as syn. Apogon flagelliferus (Smith, 1961) (Sodwana Bay and Mozambique)
- Blackfoot cardinal, Ostorhinchus nigripes (Playfair, 1867), recorded as syn. Apogon nigripes Playfair, 1867 (Lake St. Lucia northwards, probably to Red Sea)
- Ninestripe cardinal, Ostorhinchus taeniophorus (Regan, 1908), recorded as syn. Apogon taeniophorus Regan, 1908 (Indian Ocean south to Sodwana Bay)
- Spurcheek cardinal, Pristiapogon fraenatus (Valenciennes, 1832), recorded as syn. Apogon fraenatus Valenciennes, 1832 (Durban to Red Sea)
- Spinyhead cardinal, Pristiapogon kallopterus (Bleeker, 1856), recorded as syn. Apogon kallopterus Bleeker, 1856 (Algoa Bay to Red Sea)
- Arrow cardinal, Rhabdamia gracilis (Bleeker, 1856) (Indo-West Pacific south to Sodwana Bay)
- Sea urchin cardinal, Siphamia mossambica Smith, 1955 (Kenya to Sodwana Bay)
- Shimmering cardinal, Taeniamia lineolata, (Cuvier, 1828) Archamia lineolata (Ehrenberg, 1828) (Indo-Pacific, Red sea to Durban)
- Mozambique cardinal, Taeniamia mozambiquensis (Smith, 1961), recorded as syn. Archamia mozambiquensis Smith, 1961 (Zanzibar to Sodwana Bay)

Subfamily: Pseudaminae

- Jelly cardinal, Pseudamia gelatinosa Smith, 1955 (Indo-Pacific south to Sodwana Bay)
- Limpid cardinal, Pseudamiops pellucidus (Smith, 1954) (East Africa south to Sodwana Bay)

==== Order Lampriformes ====
Family: Lamprididae – Opahs (Lampridae in Smiths)

- Spotted opah, Lampris guttatus (Brünnich, 1788) (all oceans but not in polar waters, occurs throughout South African waters, usually well offshore)
- Southern opah Lampris immaculatus Gilchrist, 1904 (Circumglobal south of 30°S)

Family: Lophotidae – Crestfishes

- Unicorn crestfish, Eumecichthys fiski (Günther, 1890) (1 specimen, Kalk Bay in False Bay)
- Crestfish, Lophotus lacepede Giorna, 1809 (Cape to Plettenberg Bay, rare but widely distributed in all oceans)

Family: Radiicephalidae – Tapertail

- Tapertail, Radiicephalus elongatus Osorio, 1917 (70 miles SW of Cape Point)

Family: Regalecidae – Oarfishes

- Streamer fish, Agrostichthys parkeri Giorna, 1809 (Southeast Atlantic, New Zealand and Tasmania)
- Oarfish, Regalecus glesne Ascanius, 1772 (worldwide distribution)

Family: Trachipteridae – Ribbonfishes

- Polka-dot ribbonfish, Desmodema polystictum (Ogilby, 1898) (1 juvenile washed ashore at Xora river and 1 found at Simon's Town, False Bay)
- Blacktail ribbonfish, Trachipterus jacksonensis (Ramsay, 1881) (East London and off Cape Town)
- Peregrine ribbonfish, Trachipterus trachypterus (Gmelin, 1789) (off Table Bay)
- Scalloped ribbonfish, Zu cristatus (Bonelli, 1819), (prejuveniles collected at Luderitz, Algoa bay and Durban)
- Taper tail ribbonfish, Zu elongatus (Heemstra and Kannemeyer, 1984) (4 specimens trawled off the western Cape coast)

==== Order Lophiiformes – Anglerfishes ====
Family: Antennariidae – Anglers

- Big angler, Antennarius commersoni (Latreille, 1804) (Natal, Red Sea and tropical Indo-West Pacific to Hawaiian islands)
- Shaggy angler or shaggy frogfish, Antennarius hispidus (Bloch and Schneider, 1801) (Indo-West Pacific, south to Knysna)
- Painted angler or painted frogfish, Antennarius pictus (Shaw and Nodder, 1794) (Durban to Zanzibar and tropical Indo-West Pacific to Hawaii)
- Striped angler or striated frogfish, Antennarius striatus (Shaw and Nodder, 1794) (Algoa Bay through Indo-West Pacific to Hawaiian islands)
- Freckled angler, Antennatus coccineus (Lesson, 1831), recorded as syn. Antennarius coccineus (Lesson, 1831), (Natal; throughout Indian Ocean, Red Sea and tropical Pacific to Hawaiian islands; Tropical and eastern Pacific off Costa Rica and Cocos and Galapagos islands)
- Pygmy angler, Antennatus tuberosus (Cuvier, 1817), recorded as syn. Antennarius tuberosus (Cuvier, 1817) (Natal, Maputo, Madagascar, Aldabra islands, and throughout Indo-West Pacific including Hawaiian and Line islands, and Taumotu Archipelago to Pitcairn island)
- Sargassum fish, Histrio histrio (Linnaeus, 1758) (Cape Point to Mozambique)

Family: Ceratiidae – Seadevils

- Ceratias holboelli Krøyer, 1845 (single specimen off Cape Town at 34°12'S, 16°35'E; Nearly cosmopolitan in the world's oceans)
- Ceratias tentaculatus (Norman, 1930) (Specimens from off Dealagoa bay, off southern Natal, off Saldanha bay. Throughout southern oceans)
- Cryptopsaras couesii Gill, 1883 (off Cape of Good Hope, all major oceans)

Family: Chaunacidae – Coffinfishes

- Chaunax penicillatus McCulloch, 1915 (Natal and Southern Mozambique)
- Chaunax pictus Lowe, 1846 (Knysna to Natal)

Family: Himantolophidae – Footballfish

- Himantolophus groenlandicus Reinhardt, 1837 (all major oceans)

Family: Linophrynidae – Dwarf anglers

- Linophryne lucifer Collett, 1886, recorded as syn. Linophryne digitopogon Balushkin and Trunov, 1988, (1 specimen off Hondeklipbaai on west coast)
- Linophryne parini Bertelsen, 1980 (1 specimen off Port Alfred)

Family: Lophiidae – Monks

- Natal monk, Lophiodes insidiator (Regan, 1921) (Natal to northern Madagascar)
- Lophiodes mutilus (Alcock, 1893) (Indo-West Pacific south to Natal)
- Lophiomus setigerus (Vahl, 1797) (Indo-West Pacific south to False Bay)
- Monk, Lophius vomerinus (Valenciennes, 1837), also recorded as syn. Lophius upsicephalus Smith, 1841 (off Cape of Good Hope; Eastern South Atlantic and South western Indian Ocean off South Africa; Bay of Bengal off Burma)

Family: Melanocetidae – Devil-anglers

- Melanocetus johnsonii Günther, 1864 (off all coasts of South Africa; all major oceans)

Family: Ogcocephalidae – Seabats

- Coelophrys micropus (Alcock, 1891), recorded as Halieutopsis micropus (Alcock, 1891) (off Durban; South Africa to Philippines)
- Circular seabat, Halieutaea fitzsimonsi (Gilchrist and Thompson, 1916) (Plettenberg bay to Tugela river, Natal)
- Hairy seabat, Halieutaea hancocki Regan, 1908 (Tropical Indian Ocean; off Natal)
- Spiny seabat, Halieutaea indica Annandale & Jenkins, 1910, recorded as syn. Halieutaea spicata Smith, 1965 (1 specimen, Isipingo, Natal)
- Longnose seabat, Malthopsis lutea Alcock, 1891 (off Knysna; Eastern Indian Ocean and Japan)
- Malthopsis mitrigera Gilbert and Cramer, 1897 (Natal to the Philippines, Japan and Hawaii)
- Spearnose seabat, Malthopsis tiarella Jordan, 1902 (Natal and Japan)
- Solocisquama stellulata (Gilbert, 1905), recorded as syn. Dibranchus stellulatus Gilbert, 1905 (Off Natal; Hawaii)

==== Order Mugiliformes ====
Family: Mugilidae – Mullets

- Groovy mullet, Chelon dumerili (Steindachner, 1870), recorded as syn. Liza dumerili (Steindachner, 1870) (Breede River to Bazaruto)
- Southern mullet, Chelon richardsonii (Smith, 1846), recorded as syn. Liza richardsonii (Smith, 1846) (Kunene River to St. Lucia Estuary)
- Striped mullet, Chelon tricuspidens (Smith, 1935), recorded as syn. Liza tricuspidens (Smith, 1935) (Mossel Bay to northern Kosi estuary)
- Bluetail mullet, Crenimugil buchanani (Bleeker, 1853), recorded as syn. Valamugil buchanani (Bleeker, 1854) (Knysna to Indo-West Pacific)
- Bluespot mullet, Crenimugil seheli (Fabricius, 1775), recorded as syn. Valamugil seheli (Forsskål, 1775) (Indo-West Pacific south to Transkei)
- Squaretail mullet, Ellochelon vaigiensis (Quoy & Gaimard, 1825), recorded as syn. Liza vaigiensis (Quoy and Gaimard, 1825) (Indo-West Pacific, south to Durban)
- Flathead mullet, Mugil cephalus Linnaeus, 1758 (All warm and temperate seas, estuaries and rivers)
- Longarm mullet, Osteomugil cunnesius (Valenciennes, 1836), recorded as syn. Valamugil cunnesius (Valenciennes, 1836) (Indo-West Pacific, occasionally reaches Natal)
- Diamond mullet, Planiliza alata (Steindachner, 1892), recorded as syn. Liza alata (Steindachner, 1892), (Indo-West Pacific to Algoa Bay)
- Large-scale mullet, Planiliza macrolepis (Smith, 1846), recorded as syn. Liza macrolepis (Smith, 1846) (Indo-West Pacific to Port Alfred)
- St. Lucia mullet or giantscale mullet or otomebora mullet, Planiliza melinoptera (Valenciennes, 1836) recorded as syn. Liza luciae (Penrith & Penrith, 1967), and as syn. Liza melinoptera (Valenciennes, 1836) (Northern Transkei to southern Mozambique, Indo-West Pacific,)
- Freshwater mullet, Pseudomyxus capensis (Valenciennes, 1836), recorded as syn. Myxus capensis (Valenciennes, 1836) (Knysna to KwaZulu-Natal)

==== Order Mulliformes ====
Family: Mullidae – Goatfishes

- Yellowstripe goatfish, Mulloidichthys flavolineatus (Lacepède, 1801) (Red Sea to Knysna)(syn. Mulloides flavolineatus Lacepède, 1801)
- Flame goatfish or yellowfin goatfish, Mulloidichthys vanicolensis (Valenciennes, 1831) (Northern KwaZulu-Natal to Indo-West Pacific)(syn. Mulloides vanicolensis)
- Dash-dot goatfish or dash-and-dot goatfish, Parupeneus barberinus (Lacepède, 1801) (Indo-West Pacific south to Mossel Bay)
- Goldsaddle goatfish, Parupeneus cyclostomus (Lacepède, 1801) (Red Sea to Durban)
- Redspot goatfish, Parupeneus heptacanthus (Lacepède, 1802), recorded as syn. Parupeneus cinnabarinus (Cuvier, 1829) (Red Sea south to Transkei)
- Indian goatfish, Parupeneus indicus Shaw, 1803 (Indo-West Pacific to Port Alfred)
- Band dot goatfish, Parupeneus macronemus (Lacepède, 1801) (Red Sea to Sodwana Bay)
- Blacksaddle goatfish, Parupeneus rubescens (Lacepède, 1801) (Cape Agulhas to Mozambique)
- Two-saddle goatfish, Parupeneus trifasciatus (Lacepède, 1801), recorded as syn. Parupeneus bifasciatus (Lacepède, 1801) (Indo-West Pacific south to Sodwana Bay)
- Blackstriped goatfish, Upeneus tragula Richardson, 1846 (Indo-West Pacific south to Durban)
- Yellowbanded goatfish, Upeneus vittatus (Forsskål, 1775) (Red Sea to East London)

==== Order Myctophiformes ====
Family: Myctophidae – Lanternfishes

- Benthosema fibulatum (Gilbert and Cramer, 1897) (Indian Ocean (18°N - 20°S), to 42°S in Agulhas current)
- Benthosema suborbitale (Gilbert, 1913) (tropical distribution in 3 major oceans, extensions to 50°S and 50°N in western boundary currents)
- Bolinichthys indicus (Nafpaktitis and Nafpaktitis, 1969) (Indian Ocean (20° - 45°S); Atlantic (20° - 50°N and 20° - 40°S))
- Stubby lanternfish, Bolinichthys supralateralis (Parr, 1928) (off Cape Peninsula and in Agulgas current; Atlantic (40°N - 02°S and 32° to 40°S); Indian Ocean (21° - 30°S); west coast of Australia and near Hawaii)
- Roundnose lanternfish, Centrobranchus nigroocellatus (Günther, 1873) (Atlantic (40°N - 36°S); Indian Ocean (08° - 34°S) and off Chile and New Zealand)
- Warming's lantern fish, Ceratoscopelus warmingii (Lütken, 1892) (Atlantic(42°N - 40°S); Indian Ocean (20°N - 45°S);tropical/subtropical Pacific)
- Bright lanternfish, Ctenoscopelus phengodes (Lütken, 1892), recorded as syn. Myctophum phengodes (Lütken, 1892) (Off all South African coasts)
- Dasyscopelus asper (Richardson, 1845), recorded as syn. Myctophum asperum Richardson, 1845, (off east coast and in Agulhas water pockets off west coast.)
- Dasyscopelus obtusirostris (Tåning, 1928), recorded as syn. Myctophum obtusirostre Tåning, 1928 (In Agulhas current and off west coast in pockets of Agulhas water)
- Wisner's lanternfish, Dasyscopelus selenops (Tåning, 1928), recorded as syn. Myctophum selenops Tåning, 1928 (West of Cape Peninsula in Agulhas water pockets)
- Spiny lanternfish, Dasyscopelus spinosus (Steindachner, 1867), recorded as syn. Myctophum spinosum (Steindachner, 1867) (In Agulhas current and off west coast in Agulhas water pockets)
- Short-headed lantern fish, Diaphus brachycephalus Tåning, 1928 (In Agulhas current and off west coast in Agulhas water pockets; broadly tropical in Atlantic and Indo-Pacific)
- Crown lanternfish. Diaphus diadematus Tåning, 1928 (in Agulhas current and off west coast in Agulhas water pockets and warmed upwelled central water northwards to 18°S; Indian Ocean (02°N - 38°S, and in Mozambique channel, but absent in central sector)
- Dumeril's lanternfish, Diaphus dumerilii (Bleeker, 1856) (off west coast as pseudoceanic pelagic species southward to 23°S)
- Headlight fish, Diaphus effulgens (Goode and Bean, 1896) (off all SA coasts)
- Garman's lanternfish, Diaphus garmani (Gilbert, 1906)(east coast continental shelf/slope southwards to about 26°S)
- Hudson's lanternfish, Diaphus hudsoni (Zubrigg and Scott, 1976) (From 18°S off west coast to 27°S off east coast)
- Jensen's lanternfish, Diaphus jenseni Tåning, 1932 (one record at 33°49'S, 27°48'E; Indo-Pacific)
- Spotlight lanternfish, Diaphus lucidus (Goode and Bean, 1896) (In Agulhas current and off west coast in Agulhas water pockets. Atlantic(40°N - 38°S, but absent in Benguela upwelling region); also Indo-Pacific)
- Luetken's lanternfish, Diaphus luetkeni (Brauer, 1904) (In Agulhas current to 37°S. Atlantic (42°N - 11°S) also Indo-Pacific)
- Mead's lanternfish, Diaphus meadi Nafpaktitis, 1978 (In upwelled waters off west coast northwards to at least 21°S. Circumglobal convergence species (32° - 41°S))
- Spothead lantern fish, Diaphus metopoclampus Cocco, 1829 South of 29°S off west coast and 27°S off east coast. Mediterranean, Atlantic, Indo-West Pacific)
- Soft lanternfish, Diaphus mollis Tåning, 1928 (off all SA coasts, Broadly tropical distribution in all major oceans)
- Diaphus nielseni Nafpaktitis, 1978 (taken once from Agulhas current (30°17'S, 31°25'E); off east coast of Madagascar, in Mozambique channel, and from southeast Asian seas to southern Japan)
- Ostenfeld's lanternfish, Diaphus ostenfeldi Tåning, 1932 (off west coast northwards to about 23°S; Circumglobal convergence species (35° - 45°S))
- Parr's lanternfish, Diaphus parri Tåning, 1932 (in Agulhas current and off west coast in Agulhas water pockets, Indian Ocean (10°N - 12°S with extension to 25°S in Mozambique channel), southeast Asian seas and Pacific (tropical waters west of 95°W))
- Transparent lanternfish, Diaphus perspicillatus (Ogilby,1898) (In Agulhas current and off west coast in Agulhas water pockets. Broadly tropical species in Atlantic (45°N - 36°S, but absent in southeastern sector); Indo-Pacific)
- Problematic lanternfish, Diaphus problematicus Parr, 1928 (In Agulhas current and off west coast in Agulhas water pockets. Atlantic(40°N - 39°S but absent south of 13°S in eastern sector); tropical Indo-Pacific with extensions into higher latitudes in western boundary currents)
- Diaphus richardsoni Tåning, 1932 (Agulhas current and off west coast in Agulhas water pockets)
- Horned lanternfish, Diaphus splendidus (Brauer, 1904) (in Agulhas current southward to 31°S; Atlantic (40°N to 28°S, but absent south of 10°S in eastern sector); Indo-Pacific)
- Slopewater lanternfish, Diaphus taaningi Norman, 1930 (over west coast continental shelf/slope southward to 24°S. Amphitropical species in Atlantic(western sector; tropical waters to 42°N; eastern sector: southward from Mauretanian upwelling region to South African region)
- Watases lanternfish, Diaphus watasei Jordan and Starks, 1904 (Over east coast continental shelf/slope southwards to about 30°S)
- Longfin lanternfish, Diogenichthys atlanticus (Tåning, 1928) (Atlantic (50°N - 48°S), Indian Ocean (22° - 45°S) and Pacific (35°N - 35°S, but absent in equatorial waters west of 130°W and near Hawaii)
- Diogenichthys panurgus Bolin, 1946 (In Agulhas current to about 38°S and in Indian Ocean (19°N - 05°S))
- Risso's lanternfish, Electrona risso (Cocco, 1829) (off east and west coasts of South Africa. Widespread in Atlantic (55°N - 40°S), Mediterranean, Indian Ocean (0° - 40°S), Tasman sea and Cook Strait, and eastern Pacific (42°N - 20°S))
- Barne's lanternfish, Gonichthys barnesi Whitley, 1943 (Off east and west coasts, south of 30°S. Convergence species in all 3 oceans (30° - 40°S))
- Gymnoscopelus braueri (Lönnberg, 1905) (Circumglobal between Subtropical convergence and Antarctica)
- Southern blacktip lanternfish, Gymnoscopelus piabilis (Whitley, 1931) (off west coast in Benguela upwelling region)
- Hansen's lanternfish, Hygophum hanseni (Tåning, 1932) (From 30°S on west coast to 33°S on east coast. Convergence species (30° to 43°S) in all 3 oceans)
- Bermuda lanternfish, Hygophum hygomii (Lütken, 1892) (West of Cape Peninsula and off east coast (25° - 37°S))
- Hygophum proximum Bekker, 1965) (South to about 37°S in Agulhas current; Indian Ocean (25°N - 10°S))
- Luminous lanternfish, Lampadena luminosa (Garman, 1899) (In Agulhas current. In all 3 oceans (20°N - 20°S) with extensions into higher latitudes in western boundary currents)
- Lampadena notialis Nafpaktitis and Paxton, 1968 (Off east coast and cape peninsula; convergence species in all 3 oceans)
- Mirror lanternfish, Lampadena speculigera Goode and Bean, 1896 (Off west and southeast coasts. Atlantic (66° - 35°N and 35° - 45°S), Indian Ocean (30° to 45°S) and Pacific Ocean (30° - 45°S))
- Onderbaadjie, Hector's lanternfish, Lampanyctodes hectoris (Common in Benguela uprising region)
- Lampanyctus achirus Andriashev, 1962 (Southern Benguela upwelling region, off south and east coasts, north to about 31°S)
- Lampanyctus alatus Goode and Bean, 1896 (Off all South African coasts; Atlantic (46°N - 38°S), Indian Ocean (0° - 39°S)
- Lampanyctus ater Tåning, 1928 (Off all South African coasts; Atlantic (58° - 17°N and 15° - 40°S) and Indian Ocean (12° - 44°S))
- Southern lanternfish, Lampanyctus australis Tåning, 1932 (Off all South African coasts; Circumglobal convergence species(33° - 43°S with northern extension to about 27°S in eastern boundary currents))
- Lampanyctus festivus Tåning, 1928 (off all South African coasts. Atlantic(53° - 18°N and 28° - 40°S with northern extension to 12°S in Benguela current and Indo-West Pacific.)
- Lampanyctus intricarius Tåning, 1928 (In southern Benguela upwelling region. Atlantic (65° - 32°N and region of subtropical convergence) and Indo-Pacific (region of subtropical convergence, with northern extension to 18°S in eastern boundary currents)
- Lampanyctus lepidolychnus Bekker, 1967 (off all South African coasts, circumglobal convergence species (23° - 48°S))
- Lampanyctus lineatus Tåning, 1928 (Taken once at 34°12'S, 16°35'E)
- Lampanyctus macdonaldi (Goode and Bean, 1896) (West of Cape Peninsula, Circumglobal between subtropical convergence and Antarctic polar front)
- Lampanyctus nobilis Tåning, 1928 (In agulhas current and off west coast in Agulhas water pockets. Atlantic (40°N - 21°S), Indo-Pacific)
- Lampanyctus pusillus (Johnson, 1890) (Off all South African coasts. Bisubtropical species in all major oceans)
- Lampanyctus turneri (Fowler, 1934) (In Agulhas current and off west coast in Agulhas water pockets. Tropical and subtropical waters between south China sea and western Indian Ocean)
- Lampichthys procerus (Brauer, 1904) (Off Cape Peninsula, circumglobal convergence species (32° - 48°S) with extensions into lower latitudes in eastern boundary currents)
- Lobianchia dofleini (Zugmayer, 1911) (Off all South African coasts. Mediterranean, Atlantic (50°N - 40°S), Indian Ocean (23° - 38°S), Tasman sea and south Pacific(region of subtropical convergence))
- Cocco's lantern fish, Lobianchia gemellarii (Cocco, 1838) (off all South African coasts. Worldwide in tropical/subtropical waters.)
- Flaccid lanternfish, Metelectrona ventralis (Bekker, 1063) (West of Cape Peninsula in Southern Benguela upwelling region; Curcumglobal subantarctic species (36°-51°S))
- Myctophum aurolaternatum Garman, 1899 (in Agulhas current south to about 31°S)
- Myctophum nitidulum Garman, 1809 (In Agulhas current and off west coast in Agulhas water pockets)
- Notolychnus valdiviae (Brauer, 1904) (off all South African coasts)
- Notoscopelus caudispinosus (Johnson, 1863) (in Agulhas current south to 34°S. Broadly tropical in Atlantic (42°N - 37°S) and Indian oceans)
- Notoscopelus resplendens (Richardson, 1845) (off all South African coasts)
- Protomyctophum subparallelum Tåning, 1932 (off west coast at Vema seamount, Circumglobal in region of subtropical convergence with northern extension to 30°S in eastern boundary currents)
- Protomyctophum normani Tåning, 1932 (once west of Slangkop lighthouse; Circumglobal convergence species (36° - 43°S))
- Scopelopsis multipunctatus Brauer, 1906 (off all South African coasts)
- Symbolophorus barnardi (Tåning, 1932) (occurs off all South African coasts)
- Symbolophorus boops (Richardson, 1845) (Southern Benguela upwelling region north to 25°S; circumglobal in and south of subtropical convergence)
- Symbolophorus evermanni (Gilbert, 1905) (Agilhas current south to about 33°S; tropical Indo-Pacific)
- Taaningichthys bathyphilus (Tåning, 1928) (off east coast (30° - 33°S); widespread in all three oceans)
- Taaningichthys minimus (Tåning, 1928) (taken at 34°15'S, 16°00'E; Atlantic (40° - 20°N and 08° - 38°S), Indian Ocean (20° - 30°S); central and eastern North Pacific)
- Triphoturus nigrescens (Brauer, 1904) (In Agulhas current south to about 40°S; Indian Ocean (08°N - 15°S) and Pacific Ocean (30°N - 30°S))

Family: Neoscopelidae – Blackchins

- Neoscopelus macrolepidotus Johnson, 1863 (off Natal between 27° and 30°S)
- Neoscopelus microchir Matsubara, 1943 (one record off Natal (27°45'S, 32°44'E), both sides of the Atlantic and western Pacific)
- Scopelengys tristis Alcock, 1890 (one record at 33°25'S, 27°54'E; also all 3 major oceans)

==== Order Notacanthiformes ====
Family: Halosauridae – Halosaurs

- Gilbert's halosaur, Aldrovandia affinis (Günther, 1877) (Both coasts of SA; cicumglobal tropical and temperate)
- Hawaiian halosaurid, Aldrovandia phalacra (Vaillant, 1888) (off Cape Point)
- Abyssal halosaur, Halosauropsis macrochir (Günther, 1878) (off Cape Point)
- Oven's halosaur, Halosaurus ovenii Johnson, 1863 (off Cape Point to Walvis Bay)

Family: Notacanthidae – Spiny eels

- Spiny-back eel, Notacanthus sexspinis Richardson, 1846 (Walvis Bay to Durban)
- Polyacanthonotus africanus (Gilchrist and von Bonde, 1924) (off Cape Point)
- Smallmouth spiny eel, Polyacanthonotus rissoanus (De Filippi & Verany, 1857) (off Cape Point to Table Bay)

==== Order Ophidiiformes ====
Family: Aphyonidae – Aphyonids

- Aphyonus brevidorsalis Nielsen, 1969 (1 specimen 34°09'S, 30°45'E)
- Gelatinous blindfish, Aphyonus gelatinosus Günther, 1878 (1 specimen off Natal, all oceans)
- Barathronus bicolor Goode and Bean, 1886 (off Cape Point, specimen lost, identification dubious)
- Spotted gelatinous cusk, Barathronus maculatus Shcherbachev, 1976 (off Durban, northern Madagascar and Japan)

Family: Bythitidae – Bythitids or Brotulas

- Freetail brotula, Bidenichthys capensis Barnard, 1934 ((East London to the Cape)
- Cataetyx chthamalorhynchus Cohen, 1981 (1 specimen off Saldanha Bay)
- Cataetyx niki Cohen, 1981 (2 specimens from off the Cape)
- Orange brotula, Dermatopsoides kasougae (Smith, 1943) (Algoa bay to Port Alfred)
- Lesser orange brotula, Dermatopsoides talboti Cohen, 1966 (Saldanha Bay to Algoa Bay)
- Diplacanthopoma nigripinnis Gilchrist and von Bonde, 1924 (Off Natal)
- Bighead brotula, Grammonus opisthodon (Smith, 1934) (Port Alfred and off Storms River Mouth)

Family: Carapidae – Pearlfishes

- Star pearlfish, Carapus mourlani (Petit, 1934) (Indo-West Pacific south to Natal)
- Giant pearlfish, pinhead pearlfish, Encheliophis boraborensis (Kaup 1856) (Indo-West Pacific to Natal)
- Speckled pearlfish, Encheliophis gracilis (Bleeker, 1856) (Indo-West Pacific to Natal)
- Eel pearlfish, Eurypleuron owasianum (Matsubara, 1953) (Japan, Papua New Guinea, Australia, New Zealand, southeastern Pacific, Mozambique and South Africa)
- Pearlfish, Onuxodon fowleri (Smith, 1955) (Indo-West Pacific from Durban to Hawaii)
- Oyster pearlfish, Onuxodon parvibrachium (Fowler, 1927) (Indo-West Pacific south to Durban)
- Dogtooth pearlfish, Pyramodon punctatus (Regan, 1914) (New Zealand, Australia and South Africa (one adult from off East London))

Family: Ophidiidae – Cuskeels

- Bassogigas gillii Goode and Bean, 1896 (1 specimen off Agulhas Bank)
- Robust assfish, Bassozetus robustus Smith and Radcliffe, 1913 (One specimen off Natal)
- Goatsbeard brotula, Brotula multibarbata Temminck and Schlegel, 1846 (Red Sea to Port Alfred and east to central Pacific)
- Brotulataenia crassa Parr, 1934 (Tropical Atlantic off South Africa and southwest Indian Ocean)
- Dicrolene multifilis (Alcock, 1889) (Off Table Bay and east coast of South Africa)
- Needletooth cusk, Epetriodus freddyi Cohen and Nielsen, 1978 (between about 18° and 35°S in western Indian Ocean)
- Kingklip, Genypterus capensis (Smith, 1847) (Walvis Bay to Algoa Bay)
- Holcomycteronus aequatoris (Smith and Radcliffe, 1913) (3 specimens from off east coast)
- False kingklip, Hoplobrotula gnathopus Regan, 1921 (Natal)
- Lamprogrammus niger Alcock, 1891 (off Natal, probably circumtropical)
- Luciobrotula bartschi (Smith and Radcliffe, 1913) (one specimen trawled off Natal; known from Hawaii, Philippines and western Indian Ocean))
- Monomitopus nigripinnis (Alcock, 1889) (Eleven specimens from off Natal; several localities in Indian Ocean)
- Black-edged cuskeel, Neobythites analis Barnard, 1927 (Algoa Bay to Natal coast)
- Ophidion smithi (Fowler, 1934) (Red Sea to Natal)
- Penopus microphthalmus (Vaillant, 1888) (one specimen off the Cape)
- Slender cusk eel, Porogadus miles Goode and bean, 1886 (One specimen off the Cape; relatively common both sides of the Atlantic; also recorded from Indian Ocean)
- Barbed brotula, Selachophidium guentheri Gilchrist, 1903 (Angola to Mozambique)
- Pudgy cusk-eel, Spectrunculus grandis (Günther, 1877) (a few specimens off west coast of South Africa; also known from Japan)

Family: Parabrotulidae – False brotulas

- False cusk, Parabrotula plagiophthalma Zugmayer, 1811 (off East London; Both sides North Atlantic)

==== Order Osmeriformes ====
Family Leptochilichthyidae

- Leptochilichthys pinguis (Vaillant, 1886) (one specimen from off South Africa 36°40'S, 20°10E)

==== Order Ovalentaria incertae sedis ====
Family: Ambassidae – Glassies

- Longspine glassy, Ambassis ambassis (Lacepède, 1802), recorded as syn. Ambassis productus Guichenot, 1866 (Madagascar and east African coast south to southern Natal)
- Glassy or bald glassy, Ambassis gymnocephalus (Lacepède, 1802) (Port Elizabeth to tropical Indian Ocean)
- Slender glassy Ambassis natalensis Gilchrist & Thompson, 1908 (Natal south to Umtata River)

Family: Opistognathidae – Jawfishes

- Halfscaled jawfish, Opistognathus margaretae Smith-Vaniz, 1983 (Natal to Shimoni, Kenya)
- Robust jawfish, Opistognathus muscatensis Boulenger, 1887 (Durban to the Persian gulf)
- Bridled jawfish, Opistognathus nigromarginatus Rüppell, 1830 (Natal to south China Sea)

Family: Plesiopidae – Longfins Subfamily: Acanthoclininae – Spiny basslets

- Scotty, Acanthoplesiops indicus (Day, 1888) (Tropical Indian Ocean from India to Durban)

Subfamily: Plesiopinae

- Spotted longfin, Plesiops multisquamata Inger, 1955 (Known only from Natal)

Family: Pomacentridae – Damselfishes

- Fourbar damsel, Abudefduf natalensis Hensley & Randall, 1983 (Transkei to Kosi Bay)
- Dusky damsel, Abudefduf notatus (Day, 1869) (Indo-West Pacific south to Kosi Bay)
- Sevenbar damsel, Abudefduf septemfasciatus (Cuvier, 1830) (Tropical Indo-West Pacific south to Durban)
- Stripetail damsel, scissortail sergeant Abudefduf sexfasciatus (Lacepède, 1801)
- Spot damsel, Abudefduf sordidus (Forsskål, 1775) (Indo-Pacific south to Port Alfred)
- False-eye damsel Abudefduf sparoides (Cuvier, 1830) (Kenya to Transkei)
- Sergeant major, Indo-Pacific sergeant, Abudefduf vaigiensis (Quoy & Gaimard, 1825) (Indo-West Pacific south to Port Alfred)
- Nosestripe clownfish, Amphiprion akallopisos Bleeker, 1853 (Tropical Indian Ocean south to Aliwal Shoal)
- Twobar clownfish, Allard's clownfish, Amphiprion allardi Klausewitz, 1970 (East Africa south to Durban)
- Brown chromis, Azurina lepidolepis (Bleeker, 1877), recorded as syn. Chromis lepidolepis Bleeker, 1877 (Tropical Indo-Pacific south to Durban)
- Bluespotted chromis, Chromis dasygenys (Fowler, 1935) (Delagoa Bay to Durban)
- Doublebar chromis, Chromis opercularis (Günther, 1867) (Tropical Indian Ocean south to Sodwana Bay)
- Darkbar chromis, Chromis weberi Fowler and Bean, 1928 (Tropical Indo-West Pacific south to Aliwal Shoal)
- Footballer, Chrysiptera annulata (Peters, 1855) (Red Sea to Durban)
- Blue damsel, Chrysiptera glauca (Cuvier, 1830) ((Indo-West Pacific south to Sodwana Bay)
- Onespot damsel, Chrysiptera unimaculata (Cuvier, 1830) (Indian Ocean south to Transkei)
- Zebra humbug, whitetail dascyllus, Dascyllus aruanus (Linnaeus, 1758) (Tropical Indo-West Pacific south to Durban)
- Two-bar humbug, Dascyllus carneus Fischer, 1885 (Tropical Indian Ocean south to Durban)
- Domino, threespot dascyllus, Dascyllus trimaculatus (Rüppell, 1829) (Tropical Indo-West Pacific south to Great Fish Point))
- Redwing coral damsel, fusilier damselfish, Lepidozygus tapeinosoma (Bleeker, 1856) (Tropical Indo-West Pacific south to Durban)
- Crescent damsel, Neopomacentrus cyanomos (Bleeker, 1856) (Tropical Indian Ocean south to Kosi Bay)
- Narrowbar damsel Plectroglyphidodon dickii (Liénard, 1839) (Tropical Indo-West Pacific south to Sodwana Bay)
- Dark damsel, Plectroglyphidodon fasciolatus (Ogilby, 1889), recorded as syn. Stegastes fasciolatus (Ogilby, 1889) (Kenya to Durban)
- Stop-start damsel, Plectroglyphidodon imparipennis (Vaillant and Sauvage, 1875) (Tropical Indo-West Pacific south to Sodwana Bay)
- Widebar damsel, Plectroglyphidodon johnstonianus Fowler and Ball, 1924 (Tropical Indo-West Pacific south to Sodwana Bay)
- Sash damsel, Plectroglyphidodon leucozonus (Bleeker, 1859) (Tropical Indo-West Pacific to Transkei)
- Phoenix damsel, Plectroglyphidodon phoenixensis (Schultz, 1943) (Scattered localities in tropical Indo-West Pacific; Sodwana Bay)
- Blue Pete, Pomacentrus caeruleus Quoy & Gaimard, 1825 (Western Indian Ocean south to Durban)
- Sapphire damsel, Pomacentrus pavo (Bloch, 1787) (Tropical Indo-West Pacific south to Durban)
- Yellowtail damsel, Pomacentrus trichrourus (Günther, 1867) (Red Sea south to Sodwana Bay)
- Chocolate dip, Pycnochromis dimidiatus (Klunzinger, 1871), recorded as syn. Chromis dimidiata (Klunzinger, 1871) (Tropical Indo-Pacific to Durban)
- Blacktail chromis, Pycnochromis nigrurus (Smith, 1960), recorded at syn. Chromis nigrura (Smith, 1960) (Tropical western Indian Ocean south to Transkei)
- Jewel damsel, Stegastes lacrymatus (Quoy & Gaimard, 1825), recorded as syn. Plectroglyphidodon lacrymatus (Quoy & Gaimard, 1825) (Tropical Indo-West Pacific south to Sodwana Bay)

Family: Pseudochromidae – Dottybacks

Subfamily: Congrogadinae – Snakelets

- Snakelet, Halidesmus scapularis Günther, 1872 (Cape Columbine to Transkei)(False Bay to Coffee Bay)
- Zulu snakelet, Halimuraena shakai Winterbottom, 1978 (Sodwana Bay)
- Pencil snakelet, Natalichthys leptus Winterbottom, 1980 (Natal, off Umhlangankulu River)
- Natal snakelet, Natalichthys ori Winterbottom, 1980 (Natal, off Umhlangankulu River)
- Nail snakelet, Natalichthys sam Winterbottom, 1980 (Natal, off Port Shepstone)

Subfamily: Pseudochrominae

- Dutoiti, Pseudochromis dutoiti Smith, 1955 (Durban to Persian gulf)
- Dark dottyback, Pseudochromis melas Lubbock, 1977 (1 specimen from Sodwana Bay, 2 from Kenya)
- Natal dottyback, Pseudochromis natalensis Regan, 1916 (Durban to Kenya)
- Bicoloured dottyback, Pseudochromis pesi Lubbock, 1975 (Sodwana Bay and Gulf of Aqaba)
- Redlip dottyback, Pseudochromis sp. (Kenya to Aliwal Shoal)
- Lightheaded dottyback, Pseudochromis tauberae Lubbock, 1977 (Sodwana Bay to Madagascar and Kenya)

Subfamily: Pseudoplesiopinae

- Chlidichthys pembae Smith, 1954 (Tanzania, Ibo (Mozambique), Comoros and Sodwana Bay)

==== Order Perciformes ====
6 suborders and 20 families are represented:

- Suborder: Cottoidei
  - Family: Psychrolutidae — Fatheads
  - Family: Liparidae — Snailfishes
- Suborder: Percophoidei
  - Family: Percophidae — Duckbills
- Suborder: Scorpaenoidei
  - Family: Apistidae — Wasp scorpionfishes
  - Family: Bembridae — Deep-water flatheads
  - Family: Congiopodidae — Horsefishes
  - Family: Hoplichthyidae — Spiny flatheads
  - Family: Peristediidae — Armoured gurnards
  - Family: Platycephalidae — Flatheads
  - Family: Scorpaenidae — Scorpionfishes
  - Family: Sebastidae — Rockfishes
  - Family: Setarchidae — Deep-sea bristly scorpionfishes
  - Family: Synanceiidae — Stonefish
  - Family: Tetrarogidae — Waspfishes
  - Family: Triglidae — Gurnards
- Suborder: Serranoidei
  - Family: Serranidae — Rockcods (groupers) and seabasses
- Suborder: Uranoscopoidei
  - Family: Ammodytidae — Sandlances
  - Family: Pinguipedidae — Sandsmelts
  - Family: Uranoscopidae — Stargazers
- Suborder: Zoarcoidei
  - Family: Zoarcidae — Eelpouts

==== Order Pleuronectiformes – Flatfishes ====
Family: Achiropsettidae

- Neoachiropsetta milfordi (Penrith, 1965) (off Cape Town, Argentina, Falkland Islands and New Zealand)(syn. Mancopsetta milfordi Penrith, 1965)

Family: Bothidae – Lefteye flounders

- Cape flounder, Arnoglossus capensis Boulenger, 1898 (Angola to Natal)
- East coast flounder, Arnoglossus dalgleishi (von Bonde, 1922) (Natal, Zanzibar, Mombasa and northern Indian Ocean)
- Tropical flounder, peacock flounder, Bothus mancus (Broussonet, 1782) (Durban to Hawaii and Easter Island)
- Disc flounder, Bothus myriaster (Temminck & Schlegel, 1846) (Definitely known from Inhambane, juveniles and larvae possibly occur south to Cape St. Blaize. Southeast Africa to Taiwan and Japan)
- Leopard flounder, Bothus pantherinus (Rüppell, 1830) (Confirmed records from Port Alfred northward, juveniles possibly south to Cape St. Blaize. Indo-West Pacific from South Africa to Hawaii)
- Pelican flounder, Chascanopsetta lugubris Alcock, 1894 (Natal to Delagoa Bay, Indo-Pacific and Atlantic Oceans)
- Broadbrow flounder, Crossorhombus valderostratus (Alcock, 1890) (Durban to St. Lucia Bay, possibly reaches East London)
- Warthog flounder, Engyprosopon grandisquama (Temminck & Schlegel, 1848) (Indo-Pacific, Durban to Japan)
- Natal flounder, Engyprosopon natalense (Regan, 1920) (Known only from off Amatikulu River, Natal)
- Khaki flounder, Laeops natalensis Norman, 1931 (Known only from Natal)
- Blackspotted flounder, Laeops nigromaculatus von Bonde, 1922 (Natal, Delagoa Bay and Japan)
- Longarm flounder, Laeops pectoralis (von Bonde, 1922) (Natal, Delagoa Bay and Mombasa)
- Crosseyed flounder, Neolaeops microphthalmus (von Bonde, 1922) (One specimen from Natal, also known from Japan, Taiwan and Indo-Australian Archipelago)
- Psettina brevirictis (Alcock, 1890) (Record from South Africa based on juvenile collected off Port St. Johns)
- Tosarhombus smithi (Nielsen, 1964), recorded as syn. Engyprosopon smithi Nielsen, 1964 (Known only from 3 specimens from off Durban and Kenya)

Family: Citharidae – Largescale flounders

- Largescale flounder Citharoides macrolepis (Gilchrist, 1905) (Known only from Natal to Kenya)

Family: Paralichthyidae

- Largetooth flounder, Pseudorhombus arsius (Hamilton-Buchanan, 1822) (Indo-West Pacific south to Algoa Bay and possibly to Knysna)
- Ringed flounder, Pseudorhombus elevatus Ogilby, 1912 (Indian Ocean south to Algoa Bay)
- Smalltooth flounder, Pseudorhombus natalensis Gilchrist, 1904 (Durban and off Tugela River)

Family: Pleuronectidae – Righteye flounders

- Comb flounder, Marleyella bicolorata (von Bonde, 1922) (Natal to India)
- Measles flounder, peppered flounder, Paralichthodes algoensis Gilchrist, 1902 (Known only from Mossel Bay to Delagoa Bay)
- Poecilopsetta natalensis Norman, 1931 (Natal to Kenya)
- Crested flounder, Samaris cristatus Gray, 1831 (Natal to Red Sea and China)
- Threespot flounder, Samariscus triocellatus Woods, 1966 (Sodwana Bay)

Family: Cynoglossidae – Tonguefishes

- Natal tonguefish, Cynoglossus acaudatus Gilchrist, 1906 (Natal to Somalia)
- Fourline tonguefish, Cynoglossus attenuatus Gilhrist, 1904 (Durban to Delagoa Bay)
- Sand tonguefish, Cynoglossus capensis (Kaup, 1858)(Kunene River (Namibia) to Port Elizabeth)(to Natal)
- Durban tonguefish, Cynoglossus durbanensis Regan, 1921 (Natal to Kenya)
- Ripplefin tonguefish, Cynoglossus gilchristi Ogilby, 1910 (Natal and Delagoa Bay)
- Roughscale tonguefish, Cynoglossus lida (Bleeker, 1851) (Philippines to Mozambique, south to Durban)
- Threeline tonguefish, Cynoglossus marleyi Regan, 1921 (Durban to Delagoa Bay)
- Redspotted tonguefish, Cynoglossus zanzibarensis Norman, 1939 (Saldanha Bay to Kenya)
- Fringelip tonguefish, Paraplagusia bilineata (Bloch, 1787) (Tropical Indo-Pacific: East coast of Africa south to Durban)
- Symphurus ocellatus von Bonde, 1922 (Durban to Mozambique)
- Symphurus variegatus (Gilchrist, 1903) (Known only off East London)

Family: Soleidae – Soles

- Unicorn sole, Aesopia cornuta Kaup, 1858 (Natal to Mozambique)
- Dwarf sole, Aseraggodes xenicus (Matsubara & Ochiai, 1963), recorded as syn. Parachirus xenicus Matsubara & Ochiai, 1963 (Sodwana Bay)
- West coast sole, Austroglossus microlepis (Bleeker, 1863)(Cape to KwaZulu-Natal)(Northern Namibia to False Bay)
- East coast sole, Austroglossus pectoralis (Kaup, 1858) (Cape Point to Durban)
- Lemon sole, Barnardichthys fulvomarginata (Gilchrist, 1904), recorded as syn. Solea fulvomarginata Gilchrist, 1904 (False Bay to Transkei)
- Shallow-water sole, Dagetichthys marginatus (Boulenger, 1900), recorded as syn. Synaptura marginata Boulenger, 1900 (Knysna to Delagoa Bay)
- Cape sole, Heteromycteris capensis Kaup, 1858 (Walvis Bay to Maputo)
- Foureye sole, Microchirus ocellatus (Linnaeus, 1758), recorded as syn. Monochirus ocellatus (Linnaeus, 1758) (Natal)
- Speckled sole, Pardachirus marmoratus (Lacepède, 1802) (Red Sea and western Indian Ocean from Sri Lanka and Persian Gulf to Durban)
- Persian carpet sole, Pardachirus morrowi (Chabanaud, 1954) (Kenya to Sodwana Bay)
- Blackhand sole, Pegusa nasuta (Pallas, 1814), recorded as syn. Solea bleekeri Boulenger, 1898 (Cape Columbine to Maputo)(False Bay to Maputo)
- Lace sole, Synapturichthys kleinii (Risso, 1833) (Eastern Atlantic and Mediterranean to South Africa and round south coast to Durban)
- Zebra sole, Zebrias regani (Gilchrist, 1906) (Known only from Natal)

==== Order Polymixiiformes ====
Family: Polymixiidae – Beardfishes

- Pacific beardfish, Polymixia berndti Gilbert, 1905 (Off Natal, Kenya, Philippines, Japan and Hawaii)

==== Order Saccopharyngiformes ====
Family: Cyematidae – Arrow eels

- Bobtail eel or snipe eel or scissorjaw eel or arrow eel, Cyema atrum Günther, 1878 (Off southwest coast)
- Neocyema erythrosoma Castle, 1978 (west of Cape Town)

==== Order Scombriformes ====
Family: Ariommatidae

- Indian driftfish, Ariomma indica (Day, 1870) (Mossel Bay eastwards to Southern Japan)

Family: Centrolophidae – Ruffs

- Black ruff, Centrolophus niger (Gmelin, 1789) (Temperate waters of Australia, New Zealand, South America and South Africa, also North Atlantic and Mediterranean)
- Antarctic butterfish, Hyperoglyphe antarctica (Carmichael, 1818) (Temperate waters; islands of south Atlantic and southern Indian oceans; New Zealand, southern Australia and South Africa)
- New Zealand ruffe, Schedophilus huttoni (Waite, 1910) (Circumglobal in southern ocean, taken off Cape Town, common off Namibia)
- Black butterfish or Peregrine driftfish, Schedophilus velaini (Sauvage, 1879) (Gulf of Guinea, to South Africa)(syn. Hyperoglypha moselii (Cunningham, 1910))
- Flabby driftfish or Tasmanian ruffe, Tubbia tasmanica Whitley, 1943 (Temperate waters of Southern Ocean; New Zealand, Tasmania and South Africa off Natal)

Family: Chiasmodontidae – Swallowers

- Black swallower, Chiasmodon niger Johnson, 1863 (Tropical/subtropical in the three major oceans)
- Kali macrodon (Norman, 1929) (Tropical/subtropical in the three major oceans, taken off Cape Town and Natal)

Family: Gempylidae – Snake mackerels

- Snake mackerel, Gempylus serpens Cuvier, 1829 (Worldwide in tropical and subtropical waters, sometimes in temperate latitudes)
- Escolar, Lepidocybium flavobrunneum (Smith, 1849) (Tropical and subtropical waters of all oceans)
- Sackfish, Neoepinnula orientalis (Gilchrist & von Bonde, 1924) (All oceans near edge of continental shelf and islands)
- Oilfish, Ruvettus pretiosus Cocco, 1879 (Tropical and temperate parts of all oceans)
- Snoek, Thyrsites atun (Euphrasen, 1791) (Namibia to Port Elizabeth)
- Black snoek or black snake mackerel, Thyrsitoides marleyi Fowler, 1929 (Indo-West Pacific south to Algoa Bay)

Family: Nomeidae – Driftfishes

- Black fathead, Cubiceps baxteri McCulloch, 1923 (Atlantic, Pacific and Indian Oceans)
- Blue fathead, Cubiceps caeruleus Regan, 1914 (Southern Atlantic and Pacific Oceans)
- Cape fathead, Cubiceps capensis (Smith, 1845) (Probably circumglobal in southern hemisphere)
- Longfin fathead, Cubiceps pauciradiatus Günther, 1872 (Atlantic, Pacific and Indian Oceans)
- Shadow driftfish, Cubiceps whiteleggii (Waite, 1894), recorded as syn. Psenes whiteleggi Waite, 1894 (Indian Ocean and Australia)
- Bluebottle fish or man-of-war fish, Nomeus gronovii Gmelin, 1789 (Circumglobal in warm waters)
- Banded driftfish, Psenes arafurensis Günther, 1889 (Atlantic, Pacific and Indian Ocean)
- Freckled driftfish, Psenes cyanophrys Valenciennes, 1883 (Atlantic, Pacific and Indian Oceans)
- Silver driftfish, Psenes maculatus Lütken, 1880 (Atlantic, Pacific and Indian Oceans)
- Blackrag or bluefin driftfish, Psenes pellucidus Lütken, 1880 (Atlantic, Pacific and Indian Oceans)

Family: Pomatomidae – Elf

- Elf or shad or bluefish, Pomatomus saltatrix (Linnaeus, 1766)(Namibia to Maputo)

Family: Scombridae – Tunas, mackerels and bonitos

Subfamily: Gasterochismatinae

- Bigscale mackerel or butterfly kingfish, Gasterochisma melampus Richardson, 1845 (Worldwide in southern ocean, mostly between 35° and 50° S, recorded from Table Bay)

Subfamily: Scombrinae

- Wahoo, Acanthocybium solandri (Cuvier, 1831) (Worldwide in tropical and subtropical waters. From South Africa: Algoa Bay, off Durban, and Sodwana Bay. one record west of Cape Point)
- Slender tuna, Allothunnus fallai Serventy, 1948 (Worldwide between 20° and 50° S. From South Africa: Miller's Point and Rooikrans in False Bay)
- Bullet tuna, Auxis rochei Risso, 1810 (Cosmopolitan in warm waters. From South Africa: Hout Bay, Mossel Bay and Natal)
- Frigate tuna, Auxis thazard (Lacepède, 1800)
- Eastern little tuna, Euthynnus affinis (Cantor, 1849) (Mossel Bay to Delagoa Bay)
- Dogtooth tuna, Gymnosarda unicolor (Rüppell, 1836) (Tropical Indo-West Pacific. Recorded from off St. Lucia)
- Skipjack tuna, Katsuwonus pelamis (Linnaeus, 1758) (False Bay, Algoa Bay to Delagoa Bay)
- Indian mackerel, Rastrelliger kanagurta (Cuvier, 1816) (Durban to Red Sea)
- Striped bonito, Sarda orientalis (Temminck & Schlegel, 1844) (Cape St. Francis to Natal coast, Indo-Pacific)
- Atlantic bonito, Sarda sarda (Bloch, 1793) (Angola to Mossel Bay, perhaps as far as Durban)
- Mackerel or chub mackerel, Scomber japonicus Houttuyn, 1782 (Namibia to Maputo)(Cape to Natal, cosmopolitan in warm waters)
- King mackerel or narrow-barred Spanish mackerel, Scomberomorus commerson (Lacepède, 1800) (Indo-West Pacific to Mossel Bay. Once recorded from False Bay)
- Queen mackerel, Kanadi kingfish, Scomberomorus plurilineatus Fourmanoir, 1966 (Tsitsikamma to Kenya)
- Albacore or longfin tunny, Thunnus alalunga (Bonnaterre, 1788) (Off Western Cape, Cosmopolitan between 45°-50°N and 30°-40°S)
- Yellowfin tuna, Thunnus albacares (Bonnaterre, 1788) (Angola to Natal)
- Southern bluefin tuna, Thunnus maccoyii (Castelnau, 1872) (Off Cape region in winter, probably throughout southern oceans south of 30°S)
- Bigeye tuna, Thunnus obesus (Lowe, 1839) (Off Cape region, Worldwide in tropical and subtropical waters)
- Bluefin tuna or Atlantic bluefin tuna, Thunnus thynnus (Linnaeus, 1758) (Agulhas Bank and False Bay)

Family: Stromateidae

- Blue butterfish, Stromateus fiatola Linnaeus, 1758 (Eastern Atlantic and Mediterranean round the Cape to Natal)

Family: Tetragonuridae – Squaretails

- Bigeye squaretail, Tetragonurus atlanticus Lowe, 1839 (Atlantic Pacific and Indian oceans)
- Smalleye squaretail, Tetragonurus cuvieri Risso, 1810 (off Natal)

Family: Trichiuridae – Frostfishes

- Aphanopus mikhailini Parin, 1983 (Walters shoal)
- Slender frostfish, Benthodesmus elongatus (Clarke, 1879), recorded as syn. Benthodesmus elongatus elongatus (Clarke, 1879) (New Zealand, Australia and South Africa, once found off Natal)
- Buttersnoek or silver scabbardfish, Lepidopus caudatus (Euphrasen, 1788) (Mediterranean, eastern Atlantic from Norway to South Africa, Australia and new Zealand)
- Cutlass fish, Trichiurus lepturus Linnaeus, 1758 (Cosmopolitan in tropical and temperate waters)

==== Order Siluriformes – Catfishes ====
Family: Ariidae – Sea catfishes

- Black seacatfish, Galeichthys ater Castelnau, 1861 (South coast to Port Alfred)
- White seacatfish, Galeichthys feliceps Valenciennes, 1840 (Walvis Bay to Natal)
- Natal seacatfish, Galeichthys sp. (Transkei to Mozambique)

Family: Plotosidae – Eel catfishes

- Striped eel-catfish, Plotosus lineatus (Thunberg, 1787) (Port Elizabeth to Mozambique)
- Stinging eel-catfish, Plotosus nkunga Gomon & Taylor, 1982 (Knysna to Kosi Bay)

==== Order Stomiiformes ====
Family: Gonostomatidae – Bristlemouths

- Benttooth bristlemouth, Cyclothone acclinidens Garman, 1899 (off Cape Point; tropical/subtropical in all three major oceans)
- Bristlemouth, Cyclothone alba Brauer, 1906 (off Saldanha; all three major oceans)
- Veiled anglemouth, Cyclothone microdon (Günther, 1878) (inshore from Saldanha to Mossel Bay; All 3 major oceans)
- Tan bristlemouth, Cyclothone pallida Brauer, 1902 (all three major oceans)
- Slender bristlemouth, Cyclothone pseudopallida Mukhacheva, 1964 (Off Cape Agulhas; all three major oceans)
- Rebain's portholefish, Diplophos rebainsi Krefft and Parin, 1972 (off south western Cape coast; Southern Atlantic and south-eastern Pacific Oceans)
- Diplophos taenia Günther, 1873 (all three major oceans; all around SA coast)
- Gonostoma atlanticum Norman, 1930 ( 25°26'S, 38°11'E and 39°01'S, 20°04'E; tropical/subtropical all oceans)
- Gonostoma denudatum Rafinesque, 1810 (Temperate/subtropical Atlantic; off Southern Africa to ca. 37°S)
- Margrethia obtusirostra Jespersen & Tåning, 1919 (off Cape Agulhas and 25°26'S, 38°11'E; all three major oceans)
- Margrethia valentinae Parin, 1982 (off South Africa (c. 37°S, 20°;E -20°W; probably part of Circumglobal Subtropical Convergence fauna)
- Sigmops bathyphilus (Vaillant, 1884), recorded as syn. Gonostoma bathyphilum (Vaillant, 1884) (off Cape Point; temperate/subtropical Atlantic and Pacific oceans)
- Elongated bristlemouth fish, Sigmops elongatus (Günther, 1878), recorded as syn. Gonostoma elongatum Günther, 1878 (off Saldanha; all three major oceans)

Family: Phosichthyidae – Lightfishes

- Ichthyococcus australis Mukhacheva, 1980 (Circumglobal in subtropical convergence region of southern hemisphere with records between 30° and 40°S in Atlantic sector of our region)
- Phosichthys argenteus Hutton, 1873 (South-east Atlantic, south-east of Cape Agulhas and off Natal coast)
- Rendezvous fish, Polymetme corythaeola (Alcock, 1898) (off Natal; all three major oceans)
- Slender lightfish, Vinciguerria attenuata (Cocco, 1838) (off Cape Point; all three major oceans)
- Oceanic lightfish, Vinciguerria nimbaria (Jordan and Williams, 1896) (tropical/subtropical waters in all three major oceans; East London to Delagoa Bay)

Family: Sternoptychidae – Hatchetfishes

Subfamily: Maurolicinae

- Mueller's pearlside, Maurolicus muelleri (Gmelin, 1788) (all oceans, more common in colder regions)
- Valenciennellus tripunctulatus (Esmark, 1871) (all oceans, tropical, subtropical and temperate waters)

Subfamily: Sternoptychinae

- Argyropelecus aculeatus Valenciennes, 1849 (worldwide in tropical and temperate seas)
- Argyropelecus gigas Norman, 1930 (Southeast of Cape of Good Hope; Indian Ocean to 40°S and south Atlantic to 38°S)
- Argyropelecus hemigymnus Cocco, 1829 (worldwide distribution, common on SA waters to 35°S)
- Polyipnus indicus Schultz, 1961 (east coast from 30°S to 5°N)
- Sternoptyx diaphana Hermann, 1981 (worldwide in tropical and temperate seas)
- Sternoptyx pseudodiaphana Borodulina, 1977 (Indian Ocean south of 35°S; circumglobal in Southern Ocean; Benguela current)

Family: Stomiidae

Subfamily: Astronesthinae – Snaggletooths

- Astronesthes boulengeri Gilchrist, 1902 (southeast of Cape Point, Circumpolar between 30° and 40°S)
- Astronesthes indicus Brauer, 1902 (Circumglobal in tropical waters, Taken between 33° and 35°S on Atlantic side)
- Astronesthes martensii Klunzinger, 1871 (Indonesia to Red Sea and south to Durban)
- Borostomias mononema (Regan and Trewavas, 1929) (mainly in tropical waters of Atlantic and Indian oceans, Reported from Atlantic side at about 28°S and from Indian Ocean to about 25°S)
- Neonesthes capensis (Gilchrist and von Bonde, 1924) (off South Africa, Subtropical/temperate waters of all oceans)

Subfamily: Idiacanthinae – Sawtail-fishes

- Idiacanthus atlanticus Brauer, 1906 (Circumglobal between about 26°S and Subtropical convergence
- Ribbon sawtail fish, Idiacanthus fasciola Peters, 1877 (off east coast and in Agulhas water pockets in eastern south Atlantic. 24°-26°S)

Subfamily: Malacosteinae – Loosejaws

- Aristostomias polydactylus Regan and Trewavas, 1930 (Taken once on Atlantic side, once on Indian Ocean side of the area, occurs in all three major oceans)
- Malacosteus niger Ayres, 1848 (Tropical and subtropical in all three major oceans)

Subfamily: Melanostomiinae – Scaleless dragonfishes

- Bathophilus digitatus (Welsh, 1923) (single specimen from off Cape Town; North Atlantic, Indian and pacific oceans)
- Bathophilus longipinnis (Pappenheim, 1912) (off Cape Town; occurs widely in all three major oceans)
- Bathophilus nigerrimus Giglioli, 1884 (Off Cape Town and off Port Elizabeth to Mozambique channel)
- Echiostoma barbatum Lowe, 1843 (Southeast of Algoa Bay and off Cape Town; widespread in tropical/subtropical waters of all oceans)
- Eustomias bulbornatus Gibbs, 1960 (south and west of Cape of Good Hope; Tropical Indian and Pacific oceans)
- Eustomias filifer (Gilchrist, 1906) (off Cape Point; tropical and subtropical Atlantic)
- Eustomias grandibulbus Gibbs, Clarke and Gomon, 1983 (off Cape Town)
- Eustomias lipochirus Regan and Trewavas, 1930 (2 specimens from south west of Cape of Good Hope; Tropical/subtropical Atlantic)
- Eustomias schmidti Regan and Trewavas, 1930 (off Cape Town; occurs widely in all three major oceans)
- Eustomias trewavasae Norman, 1930 (circumglobal between about 33° and 40°S)
- Leptostomias gladiator (Zugmayer, 1911) (Tropical, subtropical and temperate Atlantic, also Indian and Pacific oceans)
- Melanostomias bartonbeani Parr, 1927 (once off Cape Columbine; widespread in Atlantic and southern Indian oceans)
- Melanostomias niger Gilchrist and von Bonde, 1924 (widespread in Atlantic between 20° and 50°S)
- Melanostomias valdiviae Brauer, 1902 (off Cape Town and northeast of Durban; all three major oceans)
- Opostomias micripnus (Günther, 1878) (northwest of Cape Town; occurs across the Atlantic, Pacific and possibly Indian Ocean south of about 33°S) (syn. Opostomias gibsonpacei Barnard, 1948)
- Pachystomias microdon (Günther, 1878) (off Western Cape coast; widespread in all three major oceans)(Günther, 1878)
- Photonectes braueri (Zugmayer, 1913) (off Cape Town; Atlantic and western Indian Ocean)
- Photonectes parvimanus Regan and Trewavas, 1930 (off west coast; north Atlantic and central Pacific)
- Trigonolampa miriceps Regan and Trewavas, 1930 (off west coast; apparently circumglobal in Southern Ocean south of 30°S)

Subfamily: Stomiinae – Scaly dragonfishes

- Stomias longibarbatus (Brauer, 1902), recorded as syn. Macrostomias longibarbatus Brauer, 1902 (Taken once off Cape of Good Hope, Widespread in subtropical and tropical Atlantic and tropical Indian and Pacific oceans)
- Stomias boa (Risso, 1810), recorded as syn. Stomias boa boa (Risso, 1810) (Taken offshore throughout the area)
- Sloane's viperfish, Chauliodus sloani Schneider, 1801 (Taken offshore throughout the area)

==== Order Stylephoriformes ====
Family: Stylephoridae – Tube-eye

- Stylephorus chordatus Shaw, 1791 (Three specimens taken off the east coast between 31°51'S - 33°10'S, 28°17'E - 30°01'E)

==== Order Syngnathiformes ====
Family: Aulostomidae – Trumpetfishes

- Trumpetfish or Chinese trumpetfish, Aulostomus chinensis (Linnaeus, 1766), (Indo-West Pacific south to East London)

Family: Centriscidae – Snipefishes and shrimpfishes

- Razorfish or shrimpfish, Aeoliscus punctulatus (Bianconi, 1855) (Port Elizabeth to Kenya)
- Banded snipefish or banded bellowsfish, Centriscops humerosus (Richardson, 1846), recorded as syn. Centriscops obliquus Waite, 1911 (Cape Columbine to False Bay)
- Slender snipefish or longspine snipefish, Macroramphosus scolopax (Linnaeus, 1758) (Table Bay to Durban)
- Round bellowsfish or crested bellowsfish, Notopogon lilliei Regan, 1914 (Single specimen off Natal)
- Longsnout bellowsfish, Notopogon macrosolen Barnard, 1925 (Northwest of Cape Town to Saldanha Bay)
- Longspine bellowsfish, Notopogon xenosoma Regan, 1914 (Algoa Bay to Natal)

Family: Fistulariidae – Flutemouths

- Smooth flutemouth or bluespotted cornetfish, Fistularia commersonii Rüppell, 1938 (widespread Indo-Pacific south to Mossel Bay)
- Serrate flutemouth or red cornetfish, Fistularia petimba Lacepède, 1803 (Atlantic, Indian and western Pacific oceans; east coast of Africa south to Mossel bay; also reported from Walvis Bay and False Bay)

Family: Solenostomidae – Ghost pipefishes

- Ghost pipefish or robust ghost pipefish, Solenostomus cyanopterus Bleeker 1854 (Indo-Pacific region including India, Japan and Australia, and south to East London)(one specimen reported from False Bay)

Family: Syngnathidae – Seahorses and pipefishes

- Roughridge pipefish, Cosmocampus banneri (Herald and Randall, 1972) (Two specimens from Sodwana Bay)
- Narrowstripe pipefish, Doryrhamphus bicarinatus Dawson, 1981 (Sodwana Bay)
- Bluestripe pipefish, Doryrhamphus excisus Kaup, 1856, recorded as syn. Doryrhamphus excisus excisus Kaup, 1856 (Xora river mouth to Mozambique)
- Banded pipefish, Dunckerocampus dactyliophorus (Bleeker, 1853), recorded as syn. Doryrhamphus dactyliophorus (Bleeker, 1853) (one specimen at Aliwal shoal)
- Many-banded pipefish, Dunckerocampus multiannulatus (Regan, 1903, recorded as syn. Doryrhamphus multiannulatus (Regan, 1903), (one subadult taken at Sodwana bay)
- Dusky pipefish, Halicampus dunckeri (Chabanaud, 1929) (One specimen taken in Sodwana bay)
- Brown pipefish, Halicampus mataafae (Jordan and Seale, 1906) (one specimen taken in Sodwana Bay)
- Belly pipefish, Hippichthys heptagonus Bleeker, 1849 (Durban, St Lucia and 'nHtunga lakes, Natal)
- Bellybarred pipefish, Hippichthys spicifer (Rüppell, 1838) (Durban and Xora river mouth)
- Giraffe seahorse or crowned seahorse, Hippocampus camelopardalis Bianconi, 1854 (Durban to Inhambane)
- Knysna seahorse, Hippocampus capensis Boulenger, 1900 (South coast estuaries: Knysna, Keurbooms, Mossel Bay and Plettenberg Bay)
- Thorny seahorse, spiny seahorse, Hippocampus histrix Kaup, 1853 (vicinity of Durban)
- Yellow seahorse Hippocampus kuda Bleeker, 1852 (Mossel bay to Mozambique)
- Longnose seahorse, flat-faced seahorse, Hippocampus trimaculatus Leach, 1814 (Morgan Bay near kei river mouth)
- Crowned seahorse, New Holland seahorse, Hippocampus whitei Bleeker, 1855 (Natal and southern Mozambique)
- Shortnose pipefish, Micrognathus andersonii Bleeker, 1858 (Knysna to Xora river)
- Short-tailed pipefish, Microphis brachyurus (Bleeker, 1853) (Durban and Sodwana estuary to Kenya)
- Freshwater pipefish, Microphis fluviatilis (Peters, 1852) (Coffee Bay and Mtata river)
- Elegant pipefish, Nannocampus elegans Smith, 1961 (Great Fish point to Inhaca, Mozambique)
- Reef pipefish, Nannocampus pictus (Duncker, 1915) (one specimen from Sodwana Bay)
- Rock pipefish, Phoxocampus belcheri (Kaup, 1856) (one specimen from Bizana coast (31.5°S), Transkei)
- Alligator pipefish, Syngnathoides biaculeatus (Bloch, 1785) (Knysna northwards; Northern Red sea to Japan, Guam and Samoa)
- Longsnout pipefish, Syngnathus temminckii Kaup, 1856 (Namibia to northern KwaZulu-Natal),
- River pipefish, estuarine pipefish, Syngnathus watermeyeri Smith, 1963 (Tidal areas of Kariega, Kasouga and Bushmans rivers)
- Double-ended pipefish, Trachyrhamphus bicoarctatus (Bleeker, 1857) (Durban northwards to Kenya)

==== Order Tetraodontiformes ====
Family: Balistidae – Triggerfishes

- Starry triggerfish, Abalistes stellatus (Anon. in Lacepède, 1798) (Red Sea to Mossel Bay)
- Orangestriped triggerfish or orange-lined triggerfish, Balistapus undulatus (Mungo Park, 1797) (Red Sea south to Natal)
- Queen triggerfish, Balistes vetula Linnaeus, 1758 (Tropical Atlantic to southern Angola; recorded from Cape of Good Hope by Günther. Doubtful records from Port Alfred and Durban)
- Clown triggerfish, Balistoides conspicillum (Bloch & Schneider, 1801) (Indo-West Pacific south to Durban)
- Rough triggerfish, Canthidermis maculata (Bloch, 1786) (Orange River mouth to Natal)
- Indian triggerfish, Melichthys indicus Randall and Klausewitz, 1973 (Tropical Indian Ocean south to Sodwana Bay
- Black triggerfish, Melichthys niger (Bloch, 1786), (Circumtropical, has been found at Durban)
- Pinktail triggerfish, Melichthys vidua (Solander, 1844), (Tropical Indo-Pacific south to Durban)
- Redfang triggerfish or redtoothed triggerfish, Odonus niger (Rüppell, 1836), (Tropical Indo-West Pacific south to Durban and once to Port Alfred)
- Yellowface triggerfish or yellowmargin triggerfish, Pseudobalistes flavimarginatus (Rüppell, 1829) (Red Sea south to Natal)
- Rippled triggerfish, Pseudobalistes fuscus (Bloch & Schneider, 1801), (Red Sea south to Durban)
- Blackbar triggerfish or lagoon triggerfish, Rhinecanthus aculeatus (Linnaeus, 1758) (Indo-West Pacific south to Algoa Bay)
- Patchy triggerfish or reef triggerfish, Rhinecanthus rectangulus (Bloch & Schneider, 1801), (Tropican Indo-West Pacific south to East London)
- Boomerang triggerfish, Sufflamen bursa (Bloch & Schneider, 1801), (Tropical Indo-West Pacific south to Sodwana Bay))
- Halfmoon triggerfish, Sufflamen chrysopterum (Bloch & Schneider, 1801), (Indo-West Pacific south to Durban)
- Bridle triggerfish or masked triggerfish, Sufflamen fraenatum (Latrielle, 1804), (Indo-West Pacific south to Natal)
- Striped triggerfish, Xanthichthys lineopunctatus (Hollard, 1854), (Indo-West Pacific south to Port Alfred)
- Outrigger triggerfish, Xanthichthys caeruleolineatus Randall, Matsuura & Zama, 1978, recorded as syn. Xenobalistes punctatus Heemstra & Smith, 1983, (One specimen from west of Algoa Bay)

Family: Diodontidae – Burrfishes and porcupinefishes

- Spotfin burrfish, Chilomycterus reticulatus (Linnaeus, 1758), (Only juveniles reported from Cape to Salt Vlei, worldwide in warm temperate waters)
- Birdbeak burrfish, Cyclichthys orbicularis (Bloch, 1785) (Knysna to South China Sea, Philippines and Australia)
- Yellow-spotted burrfish or spotbase burrfish, Cyclichthys spilostylus (Leis & Randall, 1982), (Cape to Port Alfred and northwards to South China Sea, Philippines and Australia)
- Pelagic porcupinefish, Diodon eydouxii Brisout de Barneville, 1846 (Known from Algoa Bay. pelagic, circumtropical)
- Balloon porcupinefish or long-spine porcupinefish, Diodon holocanthus Linnaeus, 1758, (Cape to Knysna and northward. Circumtropical)
- Porcupinefish or spot-fin porcupinefish, Diodon hystrix Linnaeus, 1758, (Tsitsikamma Coastal National Park to Umtata river, Circumtropical)
- Shortspine porcupinefish or black-blotched porcupinefish, Diodon liturosus Shaw, 1804, (Port Elizabeth to Japan, French Polynesia and Australia)
- Fourbar porcupinefish, Lophodiodon calori (Bianconi, 1855), (Continental shelf from the Cape to South China Sea and Australia)

Family: Molidae – Ocean sunfishes

- Sharptail sunfish or sharptail mola, Masturus lanceolatus (Lienard, 1840), (Warm temperate waters of all oceans; recorded from the Cape to East London)
- Ocean sunfish, Mola mola (Linnaeus, 1758), (All oceans but not polar seas)
- Southern sunfish or giant sunfish, Mola alexandrini (Ranzani, 1839), recorded as syn. Mola ramsayi (Giglioli, 1883), (Known only from New Zealand, Australia and South Africa. Collected from near East London to Port St. Johns)
- Trunkfish or slender sunfish, Ranzania laevis (Pennant, 1776), (Cape to Transkei; All oceans)

Family: Monacanthidae – Filefishes

- Unicorn leatherjacket, Aluterus monoceros Linnaeus, 1758, (Saldanha Bay to Beira)
- Scribbled leatherjacket, Aluterus scriptus (Osbeck, 1765), (Worldwide in tropical and subtropical seas, south to Knysna)
- White-spotted filefish, Cantherhines dumerilii (Hollard, 1854), (Tropical Indo-Pacific south to Algoa Bay)
- Spectacled filefish, Cantherhines fronticinctus (Günther, 1867), (Tropical Indo-West Pacific south to Durban)
- Honeycomb filefish, Cantherhines pardalis (Rüppell, 1837), (Tropical/subtropical Indo-West Pacific, south to Mossel Bay)
- Blacksaddle mimic, blacksaddle filefish, Paraluteres prionurus (Bleeker, 1851), (Tropical Indo-West Pacific south to Aliwal Shoal, Natal)
- Wedgetail filefish, Paramonacanthus frenatus (Peters, 1855), recorded as syn. Paramonacanthus barnardi Fraser-Brunner, 1941, (East coast of Africa south to Durban)
- Blackstriped filefish, Paramonacanthus pusillus (Rüppell, 1829), recorded as syn. Paramonacanthus cingalensis (Fraser-Brunner, 1941), (Tropical Indian Ocean south to Umgazi River, Transkei)
- Redtail filefish, Pervagor janthinosoma (Bleeker, 1854), (Indo-West Pacific, juveniles reach Algoa Bay)
- Rhino leatherjacket, Pseudalutarius nasicornis (Temminck & Schlegel, 1850), (Tropical/subtropical Indo-West Pacific; has been found at Port Alfred, East London and Bazaruto)
- Porky, Stephanolepis aurata (Castelnau, 1861), (Known only from Knysna to Zanzibar)
- Sandy filefish, Thamnaconus arenaceus(Barnard, 1927), (Known from only 3 specimens, 1 possibly from Natal, 2 from Madagascar)
- Modest filefish, Thamnaconus modestoides (Barnard, 1927), (Indian Ocean south to Algoa Bay)

Family: Ostraciidae – Boxfishes

Subfamily: Aracaninae

- Chubby basketfish, Anoplocapros inermis (Fraser-Brunner, 1935), recorded as syn. Anoplocapros robustus (Fraser-Brunner, 1941) and syn. Strophiurichthys robustus Fraser-Brunner, 1941, (one specimen from Algoa Bay)

Subfamily: Ostraciinae

- Longhorn cowfish, Lactoria cornuta (Linnaeus, 1758), (Indo-West Pacific to Mossel Bay)
- Spiny cowfish, Lactoria diaphana (Bloch & Schneider, 1801) (Indo-West Pacific south to the Cape)
- Backspine cowfish, thornback cowfish, Lactoria fornasini (Bianconi, 1846) (Indo-West pacific south to Algoa Bay)
- Boxy or yellow boxfish, Ostracion cubicum Linnaeus, 1758, (Indo-West Pacific south to Knysna)
- Whitespotted boxfish, spotted boxfish Ostracion meleagris Shaw, 1796, (Indo-Pacific south to Algoa Bay)
- Triangular boxfish, Tetrosomus concatenatus (Bloch, 1786), (From the Cape eastwards through Indo-West Pacific)
- Hunchback boxfish, Tetrosomus gibbosus (Linnaeus, 1758), (Red Sea south to Durban)

Family: Tetraodontidae – Blaasops or Puffers

- Evileye blaasop, Amblyrhynchotes honckenii (Bloch, 1785), (Cape Point to Mozambique. Tropical Indo-West Pacific from South Africa to China)
- Whitespotted blaasop or white-spotted puffer, Arothron hispidus Linnaeus, 1758, (Tropical Indo-West Pacific south to Knysna)
- Blackedged blaasop, Arothron immaculatus (Bloch & Schneider, 1801) (Indo-West Pacific south to Knysna)
- Bellystriped blaasop, Arothron inconditus (Smith, 1958) (Knysna to East London)
- Map blaasop or map puffer, Arothron mappa (Lesson, 1827) (Indo-West Pacific south to Natal)
- Guineafowl blaasop, Arothron meleagris (Anon. 1798?), (Indo-Pacific south to Durban)
- Blackspotted blaasop or blackspotted puffer, Arothron nigropunctatus (Bloch & Schneider, 1801), (Indo-West Pacific south to Algoa BayMossel Bay)
- Star blaasop, Arothron stellatus (Anonymous, 1798), recorded as Arothron stellatus (Bloch & Schneider, 1801), (Indo-West Pacific, occasionally reaches Knysna)
- Spotted toby, Canthigaster amboinensis (Bleeker, 1864) (Tropical Indo-Pacific south to Durban)
- Exquisite toby, Canthigaster bennetti (Bleeker, 1854), (Tropical Indo-West Pacific south to Port Alfred)
- Saddle toby, Canthigaster coronata (Vaillant & Sauvage, 1875), (Red Sea to Sodwana Bay)
- Honeycomb toby, Canthigaster janthinoptera (Bleeker, 1855), (Indo-West Pacific south to Transkei)
- Doubleline toby, Canthigaster rivulata (Schlegel, 1850), (Indo-West Pacific south to Algoa Bay)
- Bicoloured toby, Canthigaster smithae Allen & Randall, 1977, (Southwestern Indian Ocean south to Durban)
- False-eye toby Canthigaster solandri (Richardson, 1844) (Indo-West Pacific south to Port Elizabeth)
- Model toby or Valentin's sharpnose puffer, Canthigaster valentini (Bleeker, 1853), (Indo-West Pacific south to Durban)
- Bluespotted blaasop, Chelonodontops laticeps (Smith, 1948), recorded as syn. Chelonodon laticeps Smith, 1948, (6°S to Xora River mouth)
- Blaasop beauty, Chelonodontops pleurospilus (Regan, 1919), recorded as syn. Chelonodon pleurospilus Regan, 1919, (Xora River mouth to Durban)
- Blackback blaasop, Lagocephalus guentheri Miranda Ribeiro, 1915, (off Tugela River to Algoa Bay)
- Smooth blaasop, Lagocephalus inermis (Schlegel, 1850), (Indo-Pacific south to Algoa Bay)
- Oceanic blaasop or oceanic puffer, Lagocephalus lagocephalus (Linnaeus, 1758), (Circumglobal in warm and temperate seas, Walvis Bay to Beira)
- Moontail blaasop or lunartail puffer, Lagocephalus lunaris (Bloch & Schneider, 1801), (Indo-West Pacific south to Knysna)
- Silverstripe blaasop, Lagocephalus sceleratus (Forster, 1788), (Indo-West Pacific, occasional specimens occur between the Cape and Natal)
- Rippled blaasop, Pelagocephalus marki Heemstra & Smith 1981, (Port Alfred to Knysna)
- Blunthead blaasop or blunthead puffer, Sphoeroides pachygaster (Müller & Troschel, 1848), (Circumglobal, deep water from the Cape to Beira)
- Lattice blaasop, Takifugu oblongus (Bloch, 1786), (Indo-West Pacific south to Natal)
- Dwarf blaasop, Torquigener hypselogeneion (Bleeker, 1852), (Indo-West Pacific from Knysna to Samoa)
- Slender blaasop, Torquigener sp., (known from South Africa only from 2 specimens collected off Durban)
- Spiny blaasop, Tylerius spinosissimus Regan, 1908, (Indo-West Pacific south to East London)

Family: Triacanthodidae – Spikefishes

- Trumpetsnout, Macrorhamphosodes uradoi (Kamohara, 1933), (1 record from off Port Elizabeth; Kenya to Japan)
- Sawspine spikefish, Paratriacanthodes retrospinis (Fowler, 1934), (Japan and China to Mozambique and Natal)
- Shortsnout spikefish, Triacanthodes ethiops Alcock, 1894, (Japan to South Africa)
- Fleshy lipped spikefish, Tydemania navigatoris Weber, 1913, (Japan to east coast of Africa; several records from South Africa)

==== Order Trachichthyiformes ====
Family: Anoplogastridae – Fangtooth

- Fangtooth, Anoplogaster cornuta (Valenciennes, 1839) (In Agulhas current to about 29°S; north of 35°S off west coast. Worldwide between 46&degN and 46°S)

Family: Diretmidae – Spinyfins

- Diretmichthys parini (Post & Quéro, 1981), recorded as syn. Diretmoides parini Post and Quéro, 1981 (Tropical to temperate in Atlantic ocean with gap between 7°N -17°S; probably curcumglobal in southern oceans)

Family: Monocentridae – Pineapple fishes

- Pineapple fish, Monocentris japonica (Houttuyn, 1782) (Indo-West Pacific and Red Sea south to Mossel Bay)(Recorded from False Bay on at least two occasions)

Family: Trachichthyidae – Slimeheads

- Gephyroberyx darwinii (Johnson, 1866) (all round South African coast)
- Orange roughy, Hoplostethus atlanticus Collett, 1896 (From Iceland to Morocco and Walvis Bay to off Durban)
- Black slimehead, Hoplostethus cadenati Quero, 1974 (West coast of Africa from 36°N - 26°S, and off Transkei)
- Silver roughy, Hoplostethus mediterraneus Cuvier, 1829 (Namibia to Natal)
- Blackfin roughy, Hoplostethus melanopterus Fowler, 1938 (known from off Transkei, Somalia and the Philippines)
- Smallscale slimehead, Hoplostethus melanopus (Weber, 1913) (Indo-West pacific from Indonesia to Natal, also off Namibia and Cape Town)

==== Order Zeiformes ====
Family: Grammicolepididae – Tinselfishes

- Thorny tinselfish, Grammicolepis brachiusculus Poey, 1873 (Saldanha Bay to Durban)
- Tinselfish, Xenolepidichthys dalgleishi Gilchrist, 1922 (Walvis Bay to Natal)

Family: Oreosomatidae – Oreos

- Warty oreo, Allocyttus verrucosus (Gilchrist, 1906) (Walvis Bay to Mozambique channel)
- Spiky oreo, Neocyttus rhomboidalis Gilchrist, 1906 (Walvis Bay to Cape)
- Oxeye dory, Oreosoma atlanticum Cuvier, 1829 (Around South Africa between 30° - 35°S)
- Pseudocyttus maculatus Gilchrist, 1906 (Walvis Bay to the Cape)

Family: Zeidae – Dories

- Cyttopsis rosea (Lowe, 1843) (off Natal, Eastern Atlantic from France to Southern Angola, Caribbean and Gulf of Mexico, Southwest coast of India, Maldives and Japan)
- King dory, Cyttus traversi Hutton, 1872 (Walvis ridge and off cape town to Algoa bay, south coast of Australia and New Zealand)
- Buckler dory, Zenopsis conchifer (Lowe, 1850) (Walvis Bay to Natal and north to India)
- Cape dory, Zeus capensis Valenciennes, 1835 (St Helena Bay to Natal)
- John Dory, Zeus faber Linnaeus, 1758 (common along whole SA coast)

Family: Zenionidae – Zeniontids

- Elongate dory, Zenion leptolepis (Gilchrist and von Bonde, 1924) (Natal, Delagoa Bay and Kenya)

== Gigaclass Sarcopterygii – Lobefin fishes ==
=== Class Actinista ===
==== Order Coelacanthiformes – Coelacanths ====
Family: Latimeriidae

- West Indian Ocean coelacanth, Latimeria chalumnae Smith, 1939 (northern KwaZulu-Natal to Pumula)
