= Stemonosudis gracilis =

Conservation status
- Least Concern (IUCN 3.1)

Scientific classification
- Kingdom: Animalia
- Phylum: Chordata
- Class: Actinopterygii
- Order: Aulopiformes
- Family: Paralepididae
- Genus: Stemonosudis
- Species: S. gracilis

Binomial name
- Stemonosudis gracilis (Ege, 1933)

Synonyms
- Macroparalepis gracilis Ege, 1933

Species of fish

Stemonosudis gracilis is a species of barracudina found in tropical waters of the Atlantic, Indian, and western Pacific Oceans.

== Description ==
This species reaches a length of 9.9 cm (3.9 in).
