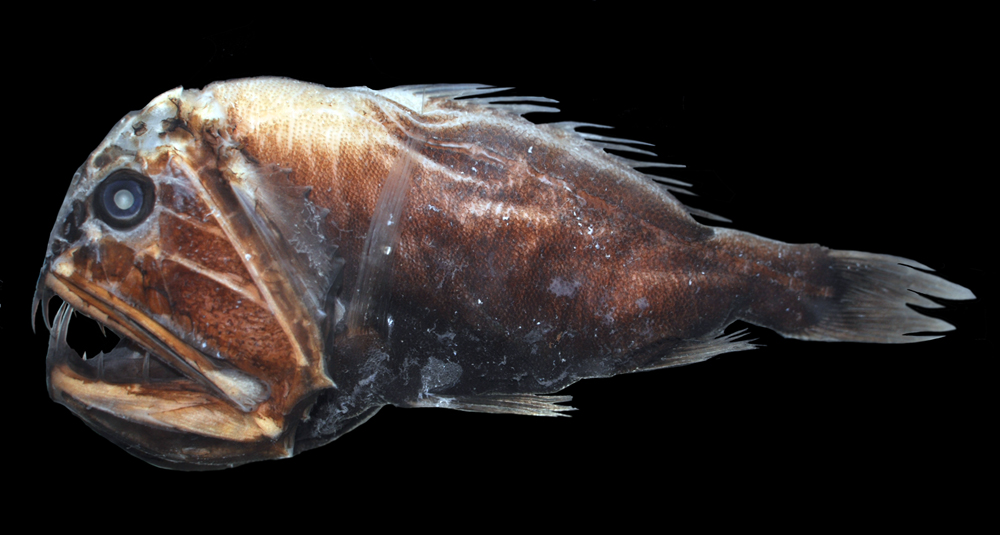
- Anoplogaster cornuta

Scientific classification
- Kingdom: Animalia
- Phylum: Chordata
- Class: Actinopterygii
- Order: Trachichthyiformes
- Suborder: Anoplogastroidei
- Family: Anoplogastridae; T. N. Gill, 1893
- Genus: Anoplogaster; Günther, 1859

= Fangtooth =

Fangtooths

Genus of fishes

Fangtooths are beryciform fish of the family Anoplogastridae (sometimes spelled "Anoplogasteridae") that live in the deep sea. The name comes from Ancient Greek ἄνοπλος (ánoplos), meaning "shieldless", and γαστήρ (gastḗr), meaning "belly". With a worldwide distribution in tropical and cold-temperate waters, the family contains only two very similar species in one genus, with no known close relatives.

== Species ==
The currently recognized species in this genus are:

- Anoplogaster brachycera (Kotlyar, 1986) (shorthorn fangtooth)
- Anoplogaster cornuta (Valenciennes, 1833) (common fangtooth)

== Description ==
Fangtooths are named for their disproportionately large, fang-like teeth and unapproachable visage, although they are quite small and harmless to humans. The larger of the two species, the common fangtooth, reaches a maximum length of just 16 cm (6.3 in); the shorthorn fangtooth is less than half this size though currently known only from juvenile specimens.

Anoplogaster cornuta are in the smaller size range of fishes. They are well known for their large sharp teeth when having their jaws closed. With the help of their teeth they are able to kill fishes much larger than themselves. The head is small with a large jaw and appears haggard, riddled with mucous cavities delineated by serrated edges and covered by a thin skin. The eyes are relatively small, set high on the head; the entire head is a dark brown to black and is strongly compressed laterally, deep anteriorly and progressively more slender towards the tail. In adults, the largest two fangs of the lower jaw are so long, the fangtooths have evolved a pair of opposing sockets on either side of the brain to accommodate the teeth when the mouth is closed. According to BBC's Blue Planet, episode "The Deep", the fangtooth has the largest teeth of any fish in the ocean, proportionate to body size, and are so large, they can never close their mouths. The juveniles are morphologically quite different - unlike the adults, they possess long spines on the head and preoperculum, larger eyes, a functional gas bladder, long and slender gill rakers, much smaller and depressible teeth, and are a light gray in colour. These differences once caused the two life stages to be classed as distinct species, with one in another genus; Caulolepis.

Unlike many other fish, the fangtooth's large, fang-like teeth are permanently attached to their jaw bones without replacement. These teeth also lack the typical calcium-phosphate layer seen in other fish teeth, a feature that may contribute to the fangtooth's survival in the extreme conditions of the deep sea. The fins are small, simple, and spineless; the scales are embedded in the skin and take the form of thin plates. As compensation for reduced eyes, the lateral line is well-developed and appears as an open groove along the flanks.

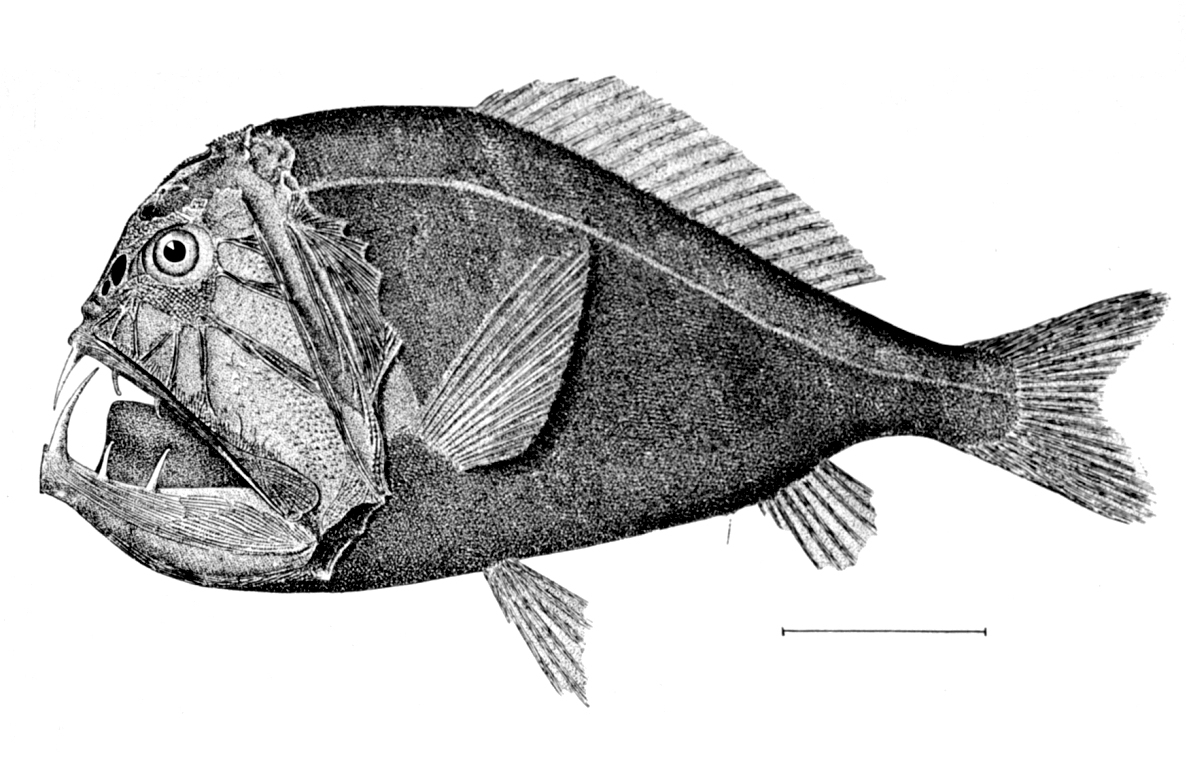
A. cornuta

== Ecology ==
The pelagic fangtooths are among the deepest-living fish, found as far as 5,000 m (16,000 ft) down. They are more commonly found between 200 and 2,000 m (660 and 6,560 ft), however, and juveniles apparently stay within the upper reaches of this range. They may undergo diel migrations as is common with many deep-sea fish: by day these fish remain in the gloomy depths and towards evening they rise to the upper layers of the water column to feed by starlight, returning to deep water by daybreak. Fangtooths may form small schools or go alone. They are thought to use contact chemoreception to find prey.

The smaller teeth and longer gill rakers of juveniles suggest they feed primarily by filtering zooplankton from the water, while the deeper-living adults target other fish and squid. The fangtooths' oversized teeth and mouths are a common feature among the miniature beasts of the deep (cf. viperfishes, daggertooths, bristlemouths, barracudinas, anglerfishes), thought to be an advantage in these lean waters where anything encountered (even if it is larger than the fish) must be considered a possible meal. The fangtooths in turn are preyed upon by other large pelagic fish, such as tuna and marlin and some species of sharks.

Fangtooths are known to be robust when compared to many other deep-sea fish; they have been kept alive for months in aquariums despite conditions which are significantly different from their usual deep-sea habitat.

== Reproduction ==
Fangtooths have planktonic larvae and are assumed to not be egg guarders; spawning frequency and time are not certain, but some activity has been reported from June–August. The juveniles of common fangtooths begin to assume adult form from about 8 cm (3.1 in) in length, at which time they begin to descend into deeper water. Onset of maturity is not known, but common fangtooths are known to be mature at 16 cm (6.3 in). They are likely slow-growing, as are most deep-sea fish.
