= Stemonosudis elegans =

Conservation status
- Least Concern (IUCN 3.1)

Scientific classification
- Kingdom: Animalia
- Phylum: Chordata
- Class: Actinopterygii
- Order: Aulopiformes
- Family: Paralepididae
- Genus: Stemonosudis
- Species: S. elegans

Binomial name
- Stemonosudis elegans (Ege, 1933)

Synonyms
- Macroparalepis elegans Ege, 1933

Species of fish

Stemonosudis elegans, the tailspot barracudina, is a species of fish found in the Indo-Pacific.

== Size ==
This species reaches a length of 5.5 cm (2.2 in).

== See also ==
- List of marine bony fishes of South Africa
