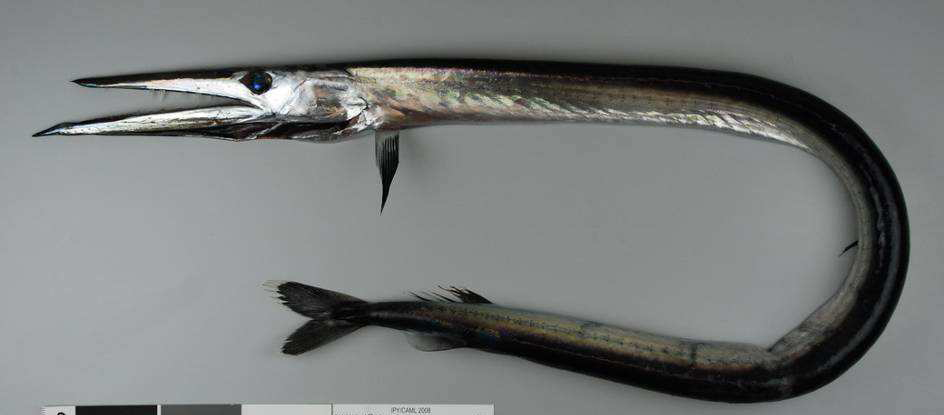

Scientific classification
- Domain: Eukaryota
- Kingdom: Animalia
- Phylum: Chordata
- Class: Actinopterygii
- Order: Aulopiformes
- Family: Anotopteridae
- Genus: Anotopterus
- Species: A. vorax

Binomial name
- Anotopterus vorax (Regan, 1913)

Synonyms
- Anotopterus antarcticus Nybelin, 1946

= Anotopterus vorax =

Species of fish

Anotopterus vorax, the Southern Ocean daggertooth, is a species of daggertooth. It inhabits the Southern Ocean circumglobally.

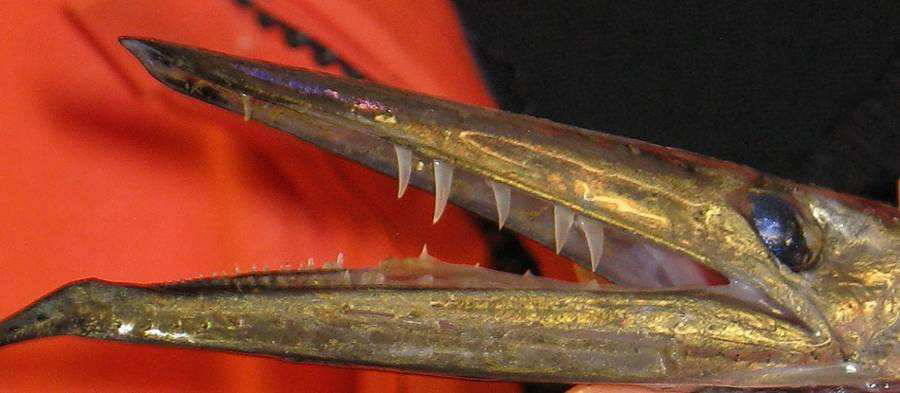
A daggertooth soon after being caught, before its colours fade

== Description ==
It commonly grows to 90 cm length, and can grow to 105 cm. It has an iridescent skin, and sapphire blue eyes. The colours fade quickly when the fish is removed from the water.

It has unusual forward-curved teeth in the upper jaw. It bites fish prey then pulls backwards, often cutting the spine and paralysing the prey. It eats mostly small fish, particularly Notolepis coatsi, a barracudina.

== Biology ==
Prior to spawning, the species sheds its teeth, while its gastrointestinal tract atrophies. They are monocyclic, dying after spawning. This reproductive strategy may have been the result of the great distance between spawning and feeding areas.
