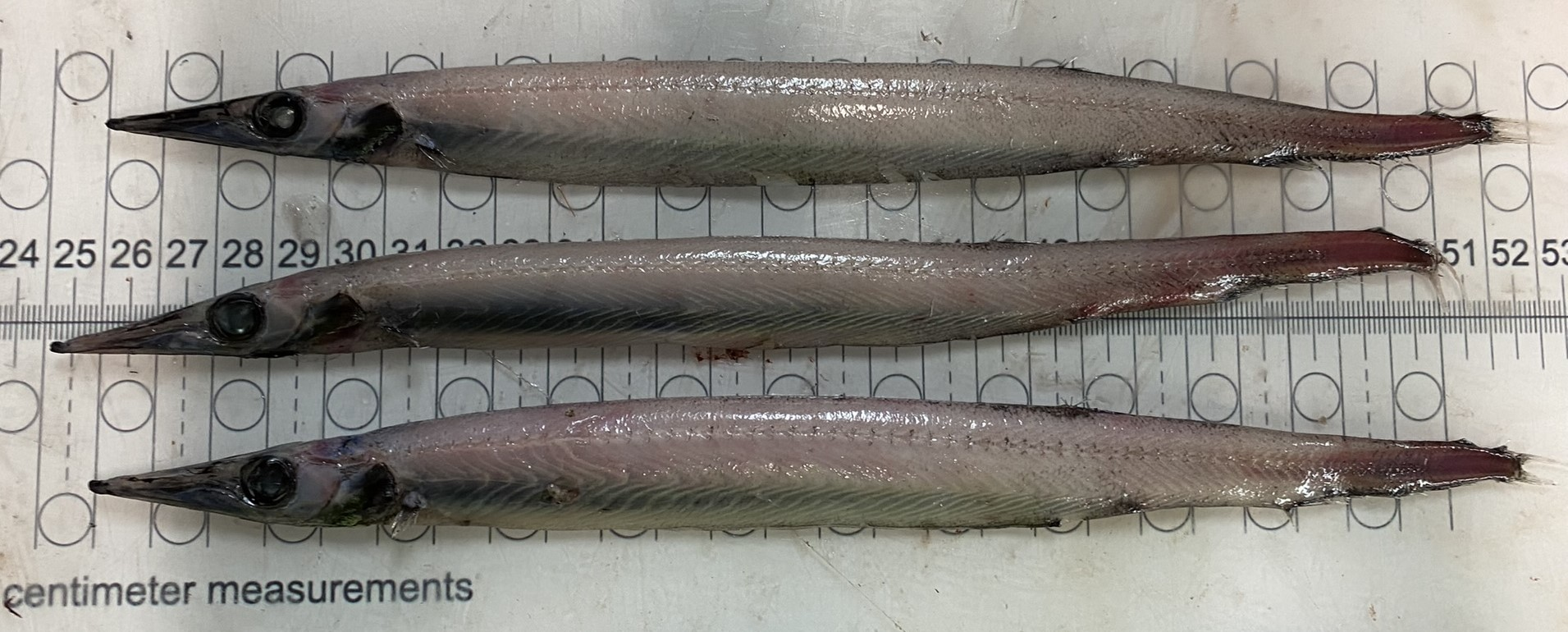

Conservation status
- Least Concern (IUCN 3.1)

Scientific classification
- Kingdom: Animalia
- Phylum: Chordata
- Class: Actinopterygii
- Order: Aulopiformes
- Family: Paralepididae
- Genus: Arctozenus
- Species: A. risso

Binomial name
- Arctozenus risso (Bonaparte, 1840)

Synonyms
- Paralepis risso Bonaparte, 1840; Notolepis rissoi (Bonaparte, 1840); Prymnothonus hookeri Richardson, 1845; Paralepis coruscans D. S. Jordan & Gilbert, 1881; Paralepis kroyeri Lütken, 1892

= Spotted barracudina =

Species of fish

Arctozenus risso, the spotted barracudina or ribbon barracudina, is a species of marine ray-finned fish belonging to the family Paralepididae, the barracudinas. This fish is found worldwide, but not in the Southern Ocean.

== Taxonomy ==
The spotted barracudina was first formally described as Paralepis risso by the French naturalist and art collector Charles Lucien Bonaparte. Bonaparte reported its type locality as waters off the Faroe Islands in the North Atlantic Ocean, at 62°16'58.8"N, 10°10'1.2"W, from a depth of 676 to 696 m (2,218 to 2,283 ft). In 1864, Theodore Gill proposed the monospecific genus Arctozenus, with Paralepis borealis as its only species and designated as its type species. However, Gill may have based this genus on a misidentified type, as he cites Kroyer, 1847 instead of Reinhardt, 1837. In 2017, a second species, Arctozenus australis, was described from the Kerguelen Islands. The genus Arctozenus belongs to the family Paralepidae, the barracudinas, in the order Aulopiformes, the grinners, lizardfishes and allies.

== Etymology ==
The spotted barracudina is the type species of the genus Arctozenus. This name combines the Greek arktos, which means "north", and zenus, a word derived from xenicus, meaning "strange" or "foreign", as this was proposed as a subgenus of Paralepis, through a misidentified holotype, which was otherwise only then known from the Mediterranean. The specific name, risso, honours the French naturalist Antoine Risso, who described Paralepis coregonoides in 1820. P. coregonoides was considered to be in the same genus as this species at the time of its description.

== Description ==
The spotted barracudina is an elongate fish with a bright silvery body. It has a maximum standard length of 30 cm (12 in).

== Distribution and habitat ==
The spotted barracudina has a worldwide distribution from the northern Atlantic as far north as Greenland, south into the South Atlantic, and in the Pacific Ocean from British Columbia south to Chile, and from Japan south to the seas around southern Australia and Tasmania. This is an oceanic species found in the epipelagic to bathypelagics.

== Biology ==
The spotted barracudina is a predator of fishes and shrimps. It may be found as single fishes or in small schools. This species is hermaphroditic and oviparous, spawning on continental slopes and oceanic banks, the eggs hatching into planktonic larvae.
