= Stemonosudis elongata =

Conservation status
- Least Concern (IUCN 3.1)

Scientific classification
- Kingdom: Animalia
- Phylum: Chordata
- Class: Actinopterygii
- Order: Aulopiformes
- Family: Paralepididae
- Genus: Stemonosudis
- Species: S. elongata

Binomial name
- Stemonosudis elongata (Ege, 1933)

Synonyms
- Macroparalepis elongata Ege, 1933

Species of fish

Stemonosudis elongata is a species of barracudina found in the Indo-Pacific from East Africa across to the Philippines, Fiji, the Marquesas, and the Hawaiian Islands.

== Description ==
This species reaches a length of 11.7 cm (4.6 in).
