= Sudis =

Sudis may refer to:

- Sudis (fish), a genus of barracudinas
- Sudis (stake), a stake used by Roman soldiers for constructing field fortifications.
