= Stemonosudis distans =

Conservation status
- Data Deficient (IUCN 3.1)

Scientific classification
- Kingdom: Animalia
- Phylum: Chordata
- Class: Actinopterygii
- Order: Aulopiformes
- Family: Paralepididae
- Genus: Stemonosudis
- Species: S. distans

Binomial name
- Stemonosudis distans (Ege, 1957)

Synonyms
- Macroparalepis distans Ege, 1957

Species of fish

Stemonosudis distans is a species of barracudina found in the western-central Pacific Ocean.

== Description ==
This species reaches a length of 2.3 cm (0.91 in).
