= Stemonosudis miscella =

Conservation status
- Least Concern (IUCN 3.1)

Scientific classification
- Kingdom: Animalia
- Phylum: Chordata
- Class: Actinopterygii
- Order: Aulopiformes
- Family: Paralepididae
- Genus: Stemonosudis
- Species: S. miscella

Binomial name
- Stemonosudis miscella (Ege, 1933)

Synonyms
- Macroparalepis miscellus Ege, 1933

Species of fish

Stemonosudis miscella is a species of barracudina found in the eastern Indian Ocean near Sumatra, Indonesia.

== Description ==
This species reaches a length of 5.5 cm (2.2 in).
