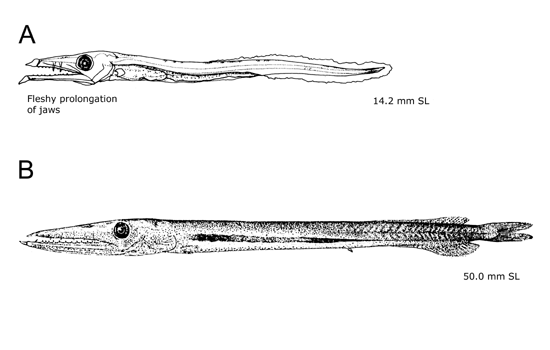
- Juvenile (top) and adult (bottom) specimens of Anotopterus pharao.

Scientific classification
- Kingdom: Animalia
- Phylum: Chordata
- Class: Actinopterygii
- Order: Aulopiformes
- Family: Anotopteridae
- Genus: Anotopterus
- Species: A. pharao

Binomial name
- Anotopterus pharao Zugmayer, 1911

Synonyms
- Anotopterus arcticus Nybelin, 1946

= Anotopterus pharao =

Daggertooth

Species of fish

The daggertooth (Anotopterus pharao, meaning "without fins on its back, of the Pharaoh") is a species of daggertooth. Its distribution includes the North Atlantic Ocean and west of Africa. The record size for this species is 96 cm and was hermaphroditic. Daggertooths are occasionally found dead in bottom trawls used for firefly squid or shrimp. They are similar to needlefish or gars. However, they are distinct. Netted daggertooth specimens are rarely identifiable, mostly because of their soft bodies, which are easily torn or flattened. This is typical of benthic animals of the deep ocean, like some transparent squids. In fact, the bodies are so soft, when pushed against the back of a trawl net, they often die because their organs are crushed and they rip. The habitat of the daggertooth is the open abyss, where few obstacles occur with which to come into physical contact.

== Metamorphosis ==
The species undergoes metamorphosis, whereupon they become black in colour, become toothless, stop feeding, develop very large gonads and the gastrointestinal tract atrophies. This was discovered in 1971, after German ichthyologist Günther Maul caught such a specimen off Madeira that measured 75.9 cm. It was posited that there may be a vertical downwards migration at this final short stage of life. The reduced light at this increased depth may have selected for the black colouration. As Anotopterus quickly shed and replace their teeth, it was hypothesized that by halting the replacement of shed teeth (which is potentially linked to the reduced exposure to Vitamin D at increased depths), toothlessness occurs quite rapidly. The phenomenon of a downwards migration paired with a colour change to black is also seen in species such as the common fangtooth, although during this process, that species develops fangs for feeding instead of losing them. The apparent rarity of specimens caught during this last stage of life may be a result of the combination of the cessation of feeding and the migration to deeper depths, making them difficult to catch.
