= Uncisudis posteropelvis =

Conservation status
- Least Concern (IUCN 3.1)

Scientific classification
- Kingdom: Animalia
- Phylum: Chordata
- Class: Actinopterygii
- Order: Aulopiformes
- Family: Paralepididae
- Genus: Uncisudis
- Species: U. posteropelvis

Binomial name
- Uncisudis posteropelvis Fukui & Ozawa, 2004

Synonyms
- Pontosudis posteropelvis Rofen, 1963

Species of fish

Uncisudis posteropelvis is a species of barracudina. It is found in the north-western Pacific Ocean.

== Description ==
This species reaches a length of 1.8 cm (0.71 in).
