= Uncisudis advena =

Conservation status
- Least Concern (IUCN 3.1)

Scientific classification
- Kingdom: Animalia
- Phylum: Chordata
- Class: Actinopterygii
- Order: Aulopiformes
- Family: Paralepididae
- Genus: Uncisudis
- Species: U. advena

Binomial name
- Uncisudis advena (Rofen, 1963)

Synonyms
- Pontosudis advena Rofen, 1963

Species of fish

Uncisudis advena is a species of barracudina. It is found in the western-central Atlantic Ocean, and from the eastern Gulf of Mexico off the coast of Florida.

== Description ==
This species reaches a length of 6.2 cm (2.4 in).
