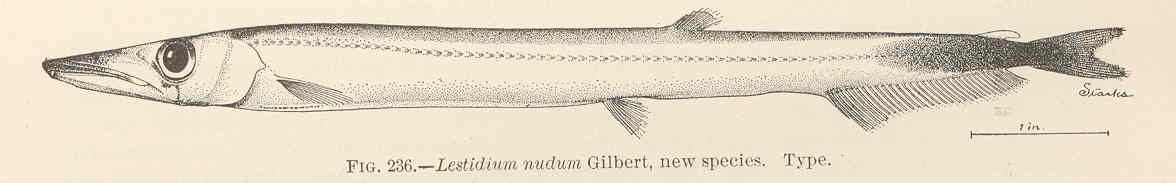

Conservation status
- Least Concern (IUCN 3.1)

Scientific classification
- Kingdom: Animalia
- Phylum: Chordata
- Class: Actinopterygii
- Order: Aulopiformes
- Family: Paralepididae
- Genus: Lestidium
- Species: L. nudum

Binomial name
- Lestidium nudum C. H. Gilbert, 1905

= Lestidium nudum =

Species of fish

Lestidium nudum, the deep water pike smelt or naked barracudina, is a species of fish. It is found in the Pacific Ocean. This species reaches a length of 24.7 cm (9.7 in).
