= Stemonosudis intermedia =

Conservation status
- Least Concern (IUCN 3.1)

Scientific classification
- Kingdom: Animalia
- Phylum: Chordata
- Class: Actinopterygii
- Order: Aulopiformes
- Family: Paralepididae
- Genus: Stemonosudis
- Species: S. intermedia

Binomial name
- Stemonosudis intermedia (Ege, 1933)

Synonyms
- Macroparalepis intermedius Ege, 1933; Stemonosudis intermedius (Ege, 1933)

Species of fish

Stemonosudis intermedia is a species of barracudina found in tropical and subtropical waters of the Atlantic Ocean from the US to southern Brazil.

== Description ==
This species reaches a length of 15.2 cm (6.0 in).
