= Lestidium rofeni =

Scientific classification
- Kingdom: Animalia
- Phylum: Chordata
- Class: Actinopterygii
- Order: Aulopiformes
- Family: Paralepididae
- Genus: Lestidium
- Species: L. rofeni

Binomial name
- Lestidium rofeni H. C. Ho, Graham & Russell, 2020

Species of fish

Lestidium rofeni is a species of fish. It is found in Taiwan and the Philippines.

== Etymology ==
The fish is named in honor of Robert R. Rofen, a former research director of the George Vanderbilt Foundation at Stanford University.
