= Stemonosudis bullisi =

Conservation status
- Data Deficient (IUCN 3.1)

Scientific classification
- Kingdom: Animalia
- Phylum: Chordata
- Class: Actinopterygii
- Order: Aulopiformes
- Family: Paralepididae
- Genus: Stemonosudis
- Species: S. bullisi

Binomial name
- Stemonosudis bullisi Rofen, 1963

Species of fish

Stemonosudis bullisi is a species of barracudina found in the western-central Atlantic Ocean and the north-eastern Gulf of Mexico.

== Description ==
This species reaches a length of 6.2 cm (2.4 in).

== Etymology ==
The fish is named in honor of marine biologist Harvey R. Bullis, Jr. (1924-1992), to whom many American ichthyologists, the author included, are indebted for supplying valuable marine collections from the cruises of the Oregon and other vessels of the United States Fish and Wildlife Service, including the type specimen of this species.
