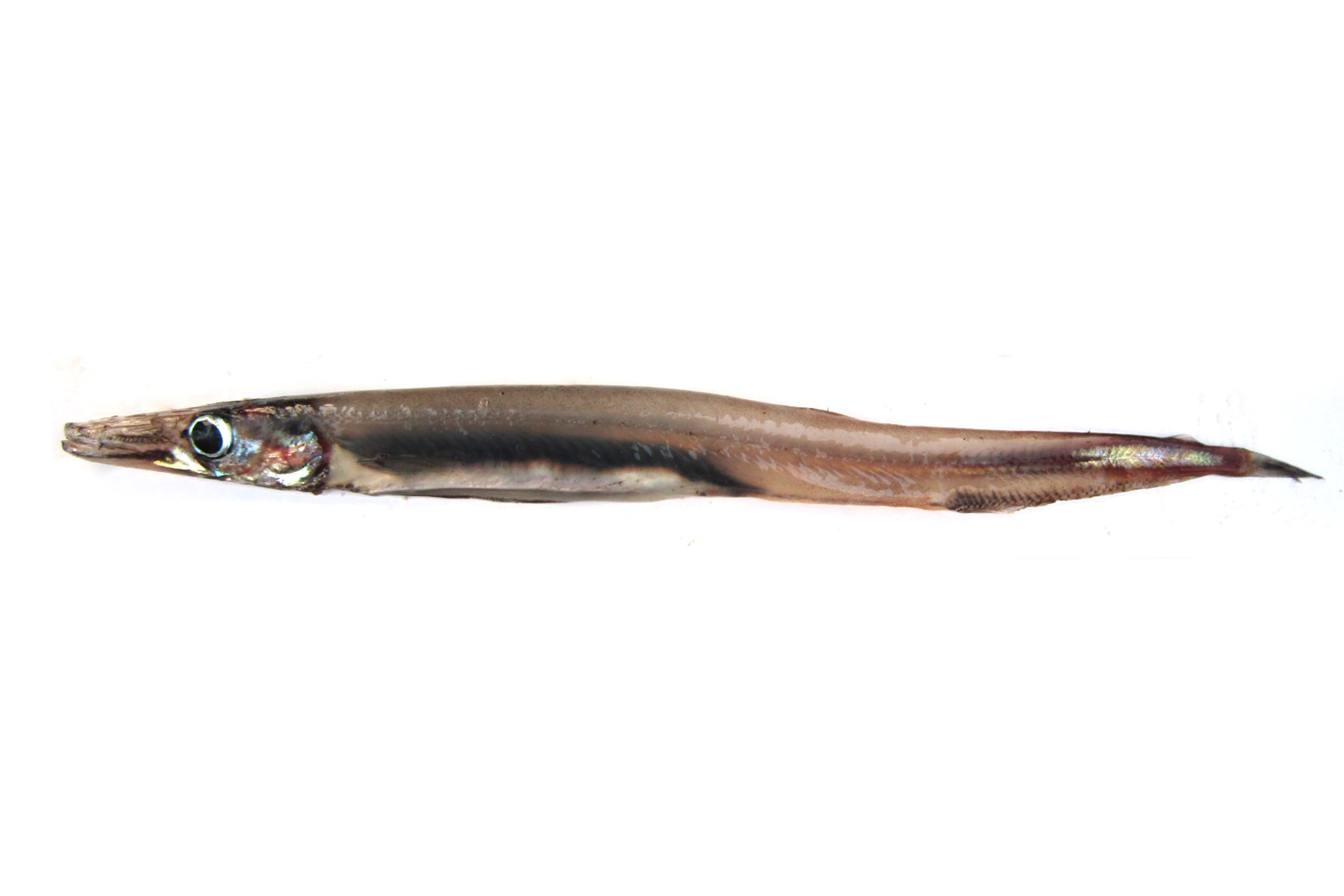
- From the Arabian Sea

Conservation status
- Least Concern (IUCN 3.1)

Scientific classification
- Kingdom: Animalia
- Phylum: Chordata
- Class: Actinopterygii
- Order: Aulopiformes
- Family: Paralepididae
- Genus: Stemonosudis
- Species: S. macrura

Binomial name
- Stemonosudis macrura (Ege, 1933)

= Stemonosudis macrura =

Species of fish

Stemonosudis macrura is a species of deep-water marine, bathypelagic fish living at the depth range 18 to 330 m (59 to 1,083 ft), member of the barracudina family Paralepididae. The fish is known to distributed in Indo-Pacific and eastern Pacific Ocean from around Point Conception State Marine Reserve in California in the north to Chile in the south.

== Description ==
The reported maximum length an unsexed male was 15 cm (5.9 in). and it has seven to nine soft dorsal rays and 33 to 38 soft anal rays. It is oviparous with planktonic larvae.

== Taxonomy ==
It was first formally described in 1933 by Vilhelm Ege.
