= Lestrolepis luetkeni =

Conservation status
- Data Deficient (IUCN 3.1)

Scientific classification
- Kingdom: Animalia
- Phylum: Chordata
- Class: Actinopterygii
- Order: Aulopiformes
- Family: Paralepididae
- Genus: Lestrolepis
- Species: L. luetkeni

Binomial name
- Lestrolepis luetkeni (Ege, 1933)

Species of fish

Lestrolepis luetkeni is a species of fish in the family Paralepididae.
