= Uncisudis longirostra =

Conservation status
- Data Deficient (IUCN 3.1)

Scientific classification
- Domain: Eukaryota
- Kingdom: Animalia
- Phylum: Chordata
- Class: Actinopterygii
- Order: Aulopiformes
- Family: Paralepididae
- Genus: Uncisudis
- Species: U. longirostra

Binomial name
- Uncisudis longirostra Maul, 1956

Species of fish

Uncisudis longirostra is a species of barracudina. It is found in the eastern-central Atlantic Ocean.

== Description ==
This species reaches a length of 18.7 cm (7.4 in).
