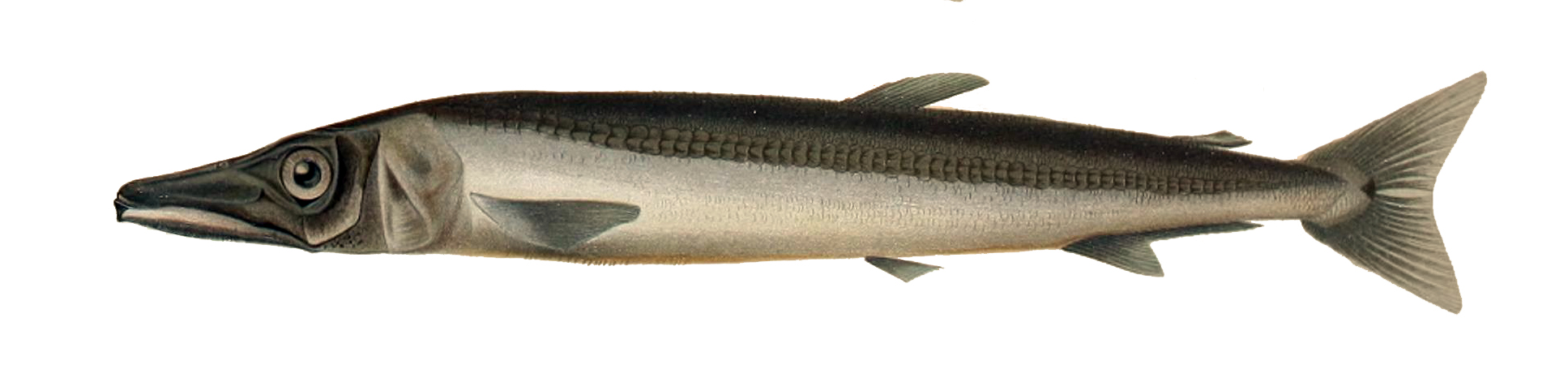
- Magnisudis atlantica, drawn by Emma Freytag-Kissling

Conservation status
- Least Concern (IUCN 3.1)

Scientific classification
- Domain: Eukaryota
- Kingdom: Animalia
- Phylum: Chordata
- Class: Actinopterygii
- Order: Aulopiformes
- Family: Paralepididae
- Genus: Magnisudis
- Species: M. atlantica

Binomial name
- Magnisudis atlantica (Krøyer, 1868)

Synonyms
- Paralepis atlantica Krøyer,1868; Paralepis atlantica atlantica Krøyer,1868; Paralepis brevis Zugmayer,1911; Paralepis bronsoni Parr, 1928; Sudis bronsoni Parr, 1928; Magnisudis barysoma Harry,1953

= Magnisudis atlantica =

Species of fish

Magnisudis atlantica, the duckbill barracudina, is a fish belonging to the genus Magnisudis of the family Paralepididae. It is a carnivorous fish that is endemic to the Atlantic Ocean (with the exception of the Southern Ocean and Arctic Ocean) and to much of the southern and northern Pacific Ocean.

== Taxonomy ==
The species was first described by the Danish zoologist Henrik Nikolai Krøyer in 1868. Its genus name Magnisudis is derived from the Latin words magnus ("large") and sudis ("stake"), while the species name atlantica refers to the fish being predominantly found in the Atlantic Ocean. The fish's common name is a reference to the shape of its jaw being similar to that of a duck's bill.

== Description and appearance ==
Magnisudis atlantica can grow as large as 56 centimeters in length however they generally average around 43 centimeters.

Fishes of this species vary mildly in color from a dark gray or light black to a pale sandy beige. They have a line of similarly colored and well defined scales running down their lateral line. The gill slits, mouth and jaws are a silvery metallic color.

== Distribution and habitat ==
All oceans with the exception of the Arctic and Southern oceans are suitable environments for M. atlantica. However, the majority of specimens have been found within the northern Atlantic. Additionally there is a sizable minority of specimens which have been recorded along the Pacific coast of the Americas. A small amount of specimens have been found off the east coast of Japan and the Kamchatka Peninsula as well as the east coast of Australia off New South Wales.

Magnisudis atlantica is generally pelagic and can be found in the mesopelagic to bathypelagic zone at depths of 66–2166 meters. It often lives closer to the coast in colder waters.

== Reproduction ==
Magnisudis atlantica spawns year round in subtropical and tropical waters.

== Diet and predation ==
Magnisudis atlantica feeds on small fish and shrimp and is in turn preyed upon by sharks, tuna and fish-eating whales.
