= Lestidium prolixum =

Conservation status
- Least Concern (IUCN 3.1)

Scientific classification
- Kingdom: Animalia
- Phylum: Chordata
- Class: Actinopterygii
- Order: Aulopiformes
- Family: Paralepididae
- Genus: Lestidium
- Species: L. prolixum

Binomial name
- Lestidium prolixum Harry, 1953

Species of fish

Lestidium prolixum, the Japanese naked barracudina, is a species of fish. It is found in the waters of Japan and China. This species reaches a length of 27 cm (11 in).
