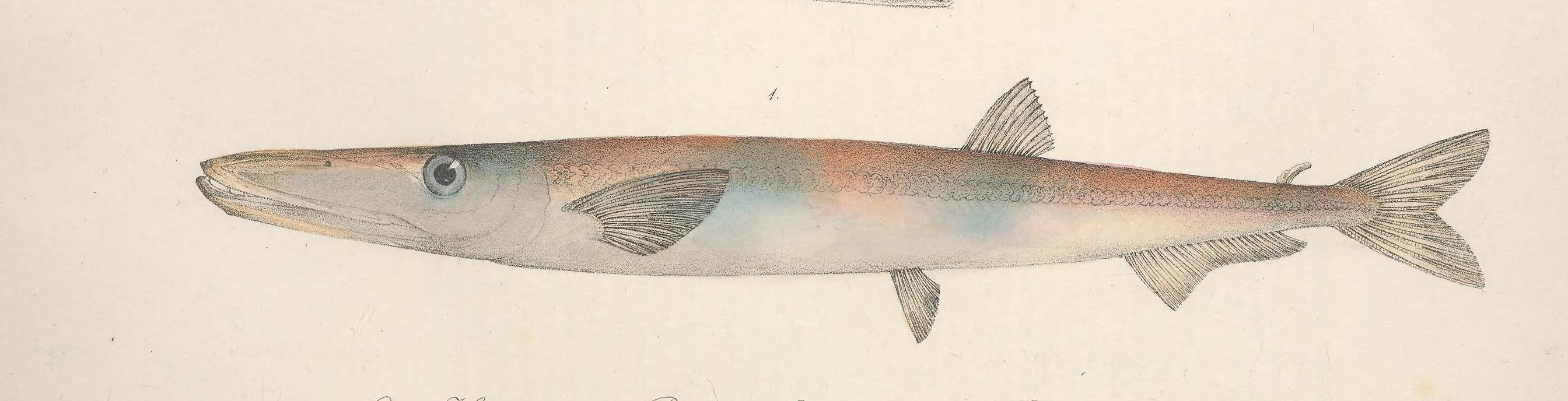

Conservation status
- Data Deficient (IUCN 3.1)

Scientific classification
- Kingdom: Animalia
- Phylum: Chordata
- Class: Actinopterygii
- Order: Aulopiformes
- Family: Paralepididae
- Genus: Sudis
- Species: S. hyalina

Binomial name
- Sudis hyalina (Rafinesque, 1810)

Synonyms
- Paralepis hyalina Rafinesque, 1810; Paralepis hyalinus Rafinesque, 1810; Sudis hyaline Rafinesque, 1810; Sudis hyalinus Rafinesque, 1810

= Sudis hyalina =

Species of fish

Sudis hyalina is a species of fish in the family Paralepididae (barracudinas).

== Name ==
Its specific name hyalina is from the Ancient Greek ὑάλῐνος (hyalinos, "crystal, glass").

It has no common name in English, but is known in Turkish as yalanci zargana ("false garfish") or derin deniz turna baligi ("deep-sea pike") and in Hebrew as ליסטים ארוך-סנפיר (listim aroch-snapir, "long-fin bandit"); this name refers to its long pectoral fins.

== Description ==
Sudis hyalina is elongated, maximum 1 m (3.3 ft) long, and silvery-pink in colour. It has large teeth in the lower jaw, fixed and armed with serrated edges. It has 59 or 60 vertebrae.

== Habitat ==
Sudis hyalina lives in the Atlantic Ocean and Mediterranean Sea. It is mesopelagic to bathypelagic, living at 200–2,000 m (660–6,560 ft).

== Behaviour ==
Sudis hyalina spawns near the surface in temperate to tropical waters.

It is believed to be one of the fish responsible for chewing at submarine communications cable.
