= Lestidium australis =

Scientific classification
- Kingdom: Animalia
- Phylum: Chordata
- Class: Actinopterygii
- Order: Aulopiformes
- Family: Paralepididae
- Genus: Lestidium
- Species: L. australis

Binomial name
- Lestidium australis H. C. Ho, Graham & Russell, 2020

Species of fish

Lestidium australis is a species of fish. It is found in Eastern Australia.
