= Lestidium longilucifer =

Scientific classification
- Kingdom: Animalia
- Phylum: Chordata
- Class: Actinopterygii
- Order: Aulopiformes
- Family: Paralepididae
- Genus: Lestidium
- Species: L. longilucifer

Binomial name
- Lestidium longilucifer H. C. Ho, Graham & Russell, 2020

Species of fish

Lestidium longilucifer is a species of fish. It is found in Western Australia and Taiwan.
