= Macroparalepis affinis =

Conservation status
- Least Concern (IUCN 3.1)

Scientific classification
- Kingdom: Animalia
- Phylum: Chordata
- Class: Actinopterygii
- Order: Aulopiformes
- Family: Paralepididae
- Genus: Macroparalepis
- Species: M. affinis

Binomial name
- Macroparalepis affinis Ege, 1933

Species of fish

Macroparalepis affinis is a species of fish which belongs to the Paralepididae (barracudinas) family. The scientific name of this species was first published in 1933 by Ege
