= Uncisudis quadrimaculata =

Conservation status
- Least Concern (IUCN 3.1)

Scientific classification
- Kingdom: Animalia
- Phylum: Chordata
- Class: Actinopterygii
- Order: Aulopiformes
- Family: Paralepididae
- Genus: Uncisudis
- Species: U. quadrimaculata

Binomial name
- Uncisudis quadrimaculata (Post, 1969)

Synonyms
- Pontosudis quadrimaculata Post, 1969

Species of fish

Uncisudis quadrimaculata is a species of barracudina. It is found in the Atlantic Ocean.

== Description ==
This species reaches a length of 9.9 cm (3.9 in).
