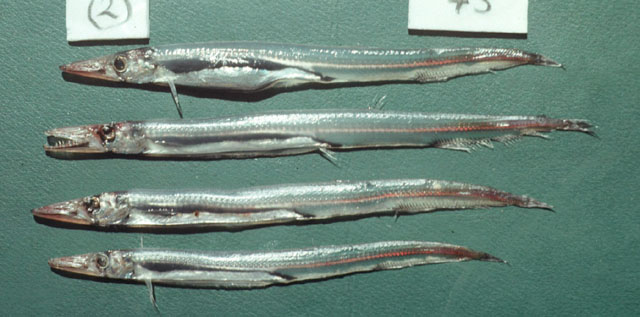
- Lestrolepis japonica specimines

Conservation status
- Least Concern (IUCN 3.1)

Scientific classification
- Kingdom: Animalia
- Phylum: Chordata
- Class: Actinopterygii
- Order: Aulopiformes
- Family: Paralepididae
- Genus: Lestrolepis
- Species: L. japonica

Binomial name
- Lestrolepis japonica (Tanaka, 1908)

= Lestrolepis japonica =

Species of Actinopterygii

Lestrolepis japonica is a species of fish in the family Paralepididae.
