= Drimys (disambiguation) =

Drimys may refer to:

- Drimys (fish), an extinct fish genus in the order Alepisauriformes
- Drimys (plant), a plant genus in the family Winteraceae
