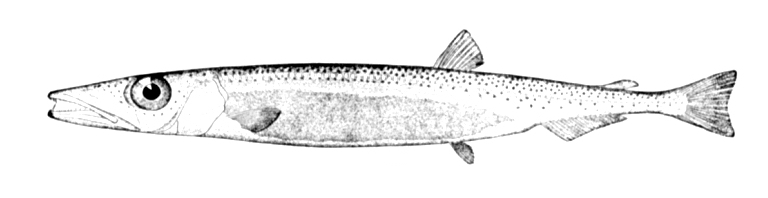

Conservation status
- Least Concern (IUCN 3.1)

Scientific classification
- Kingdom: Animalia
- Phylum: Chordata
- Class: Actinopterygii
- Order: Aulopiformes
- Family: Paralepididae
- Genus: Paralepis
- Species: P. coregonoides

Binomial name
- Paralepis coregonoides (Risso, 1820)

Synonyms
- Paralepis barracudina Fowler & Phillips, 1910; Paralepis borealis Reinhardt, 1837; Paralepis coregonoides borealis Reinhardt, 1837; Paralepis coregonoides coregonoides Risso, 1820; Sudis coregonoides Risso, 1820

= Sharpchin barracudina =

Species of fish

The sharpchin barracudina (Paralepis coregonoides) is a species of fish in the family Paralepididae (barracudinas).

== Description ==
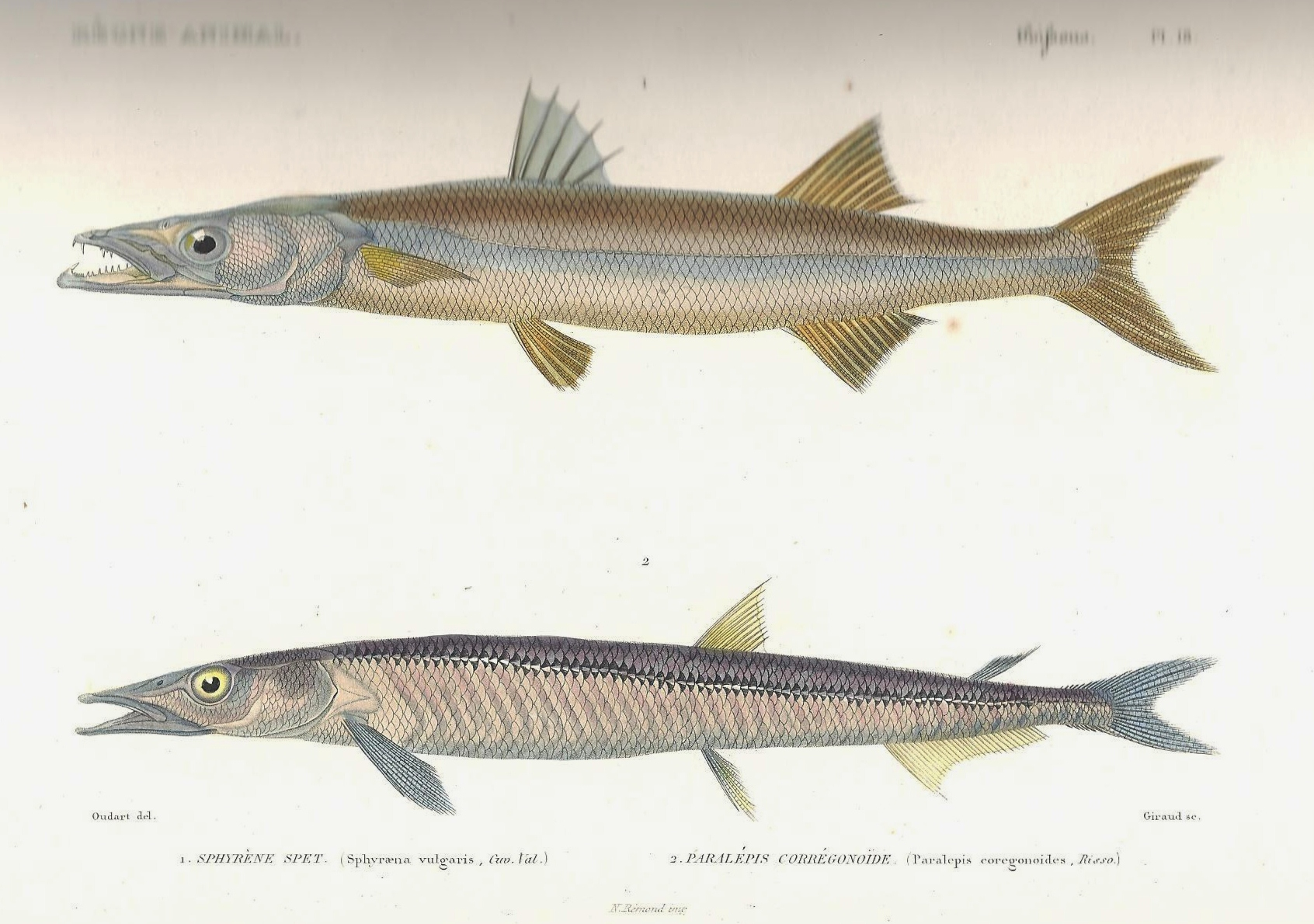
Drawing of sharpchin barracudina (bottom)

The sharpchin barracudina has a body up to 30 cm (12 in) long, brownish in colour, lighter below. It has 67–73 vertebrae The dorsal fin is well behind the midpoint; the anal fin is far back, with 22–24 finrays.

== Habitat ==
The sharpchin barracudina is bathypelagic and oceanodromous, living in the North Atlantic Ocean and Mediterranean Sea at depths of 50–600 m (160–1,970 ft), occasionally below 1,000 m (3,300 ft).

== Behaviour ==
The sharpchin barracudina feeds on fish and crustaceans. It spawns in March to September. It is eaten by tuna, cod, lancetfish, Atlantic salmon and seals.
