= Arctozenus =

Scientific classification
- Kingdom: Animalia
- Phylum: Chordata
- Class: Actinopterygii
- Order: Aulopiformes
- Family: Paralepididae
- Genus: Arctozenus; Gill, 1864

Genus of fishes

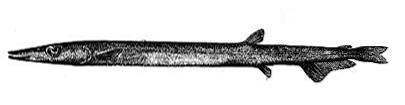
Arctozenus risso

Arctozenus is a genus of barracudinas.

== Species ==
There are currently two recognized species in this genus:

- Arctozenus australis Ho & Duhamel, 2019 (Southern spotted barracudina)
- Arctozenus risso (Bonaparte, 1840) (Spotted barracudina)
