= Uncisudis =

Scientific classification
- Kingdom: Animalia
- Phylum: Chordata
- Class: Actinopterygii
- Order: Aulopiformes
- Family: Paralepididae
- Genus: Uncisudis; Maul, 1956

Genus of fishes

Uncisudis is a genus of barracudinas.

== Species ==
There are currently four recognized species in this genus:

- Uncisudis advena (Rofen, 1963)
- Uncisudis longirostra Maul, 1956
- Uncisudis posteropelvis Fukui & Ozawa, 2004
- Uncisudis quadrimaculata (Post, 1969)
