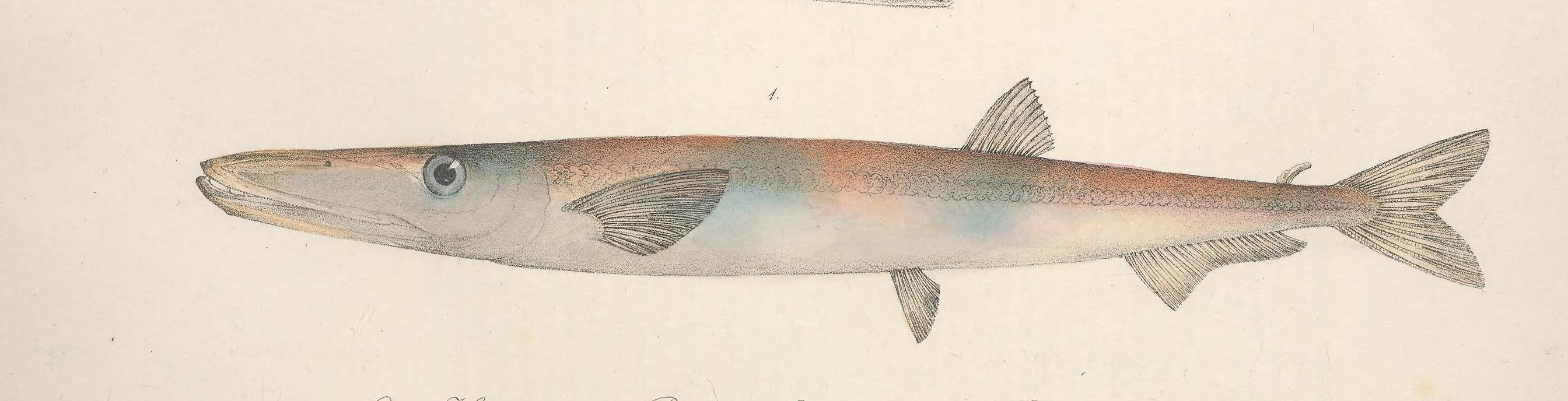
- Sudis hyalina

Scientific classification
- Kingdom: Animalia
- Phylum: Chordata
- Class: Actinopterygii
- Order: Aulopiformes
- Family: Paralepididae
- Genus: Sudis; Rafinesque, 1810

= Sudis (fish) =

Genus of fishes

Sudis is a genus of barracudinas, with two currently recognized species:

- Sudis atrox Rofen, 1963 (fierce pike smelt)
- Sudis hyalina Rafinesque, 1810

The generic name is from Latin sudis, which referred to a wooden stake, but was also used by Pliny the Elder to describe a barracuda-like fish.
