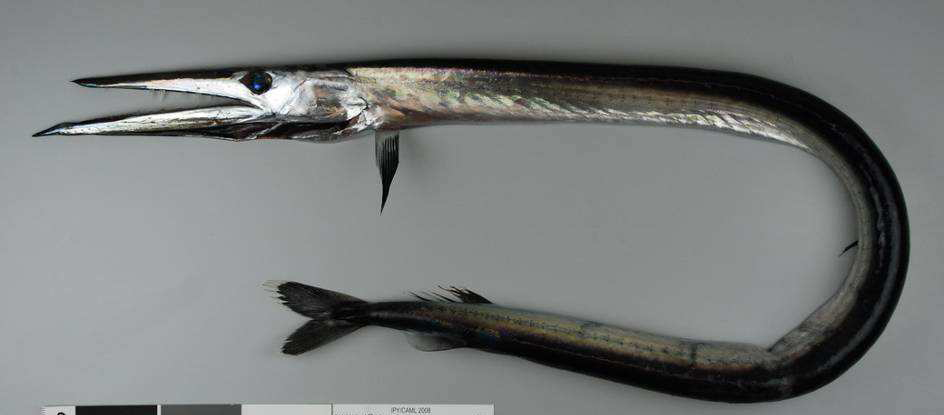
- Anotopterus vorax

Scientific classification
- Kingdom: Animalia
- Phylum: Chordata
- Class: Actinopterygii
- Order: Aulopiformes
- Family: Anotopteridae; Zugmayer, 1911
- Genus: Anotopterus; Zugmayer, 1911

= Anotopterus =

Genus of fishes

The daggertooths (genus Anotopterus) are a genus of marine mesopelagic fish in the order Aulopiformes, the sole genus of the family Anotopteridae. They are found in oceans worldwide, but prefer cooler waters.

== Description ==
Daggertooths are similar in appearance to the related lancetfishes and barracudina. They are elongate, silvery, predatory marine fishes that lack scales and have sharp teeth likely used for hunting fishes. However, as their scientific name (meaning "without fins on its back") suggests, they lack dorsal fins which easily differentiates them from their close allies, especially the similar-looking lancetfishes. Another feature that distinguishes daggertooths from lancetfishes is the placement of the large, fang-like teeth. In lancetfishes, the fangs appear on both the upper and lower jaws while in daggertooths the fangs are only seen along the upper jaw. Whether the fangs or the distinctly protruding mandible inspired the common name "daggertooth" remains unclear. Anotopterus spp. have been reported to grow to as long as 147 cm (4.82 ft). The skin of daggertooths makes them highly refractive to light. Like their close relatives, they lack swim bladders.

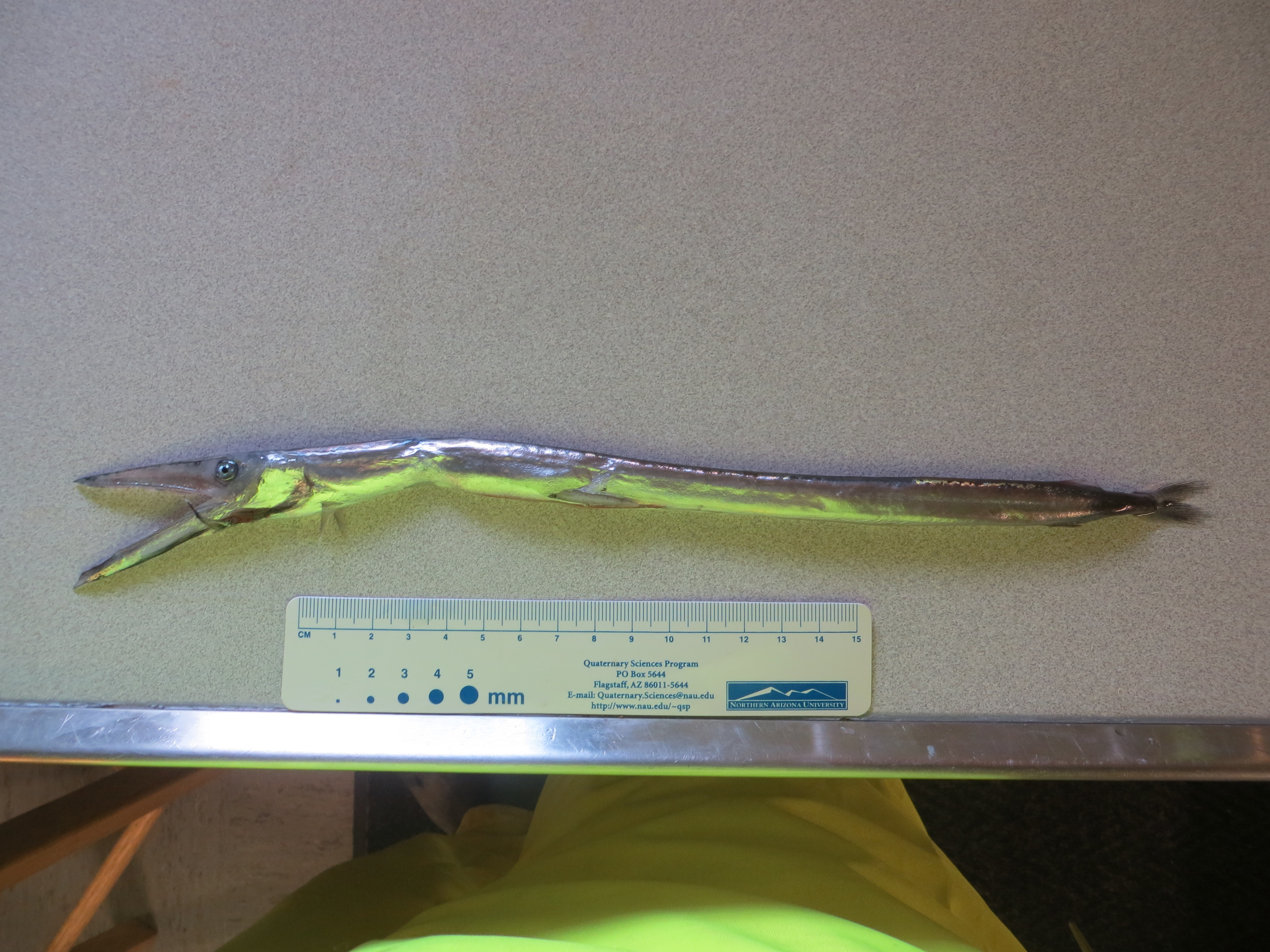
A daggertooth trawled from the mesopelagic near Bear's Seamount in the North Atlantic. The Yellow coloration in this photo is the yellow of a hi-vis life jacket reflecting off this fish's silvery skin. Photo by Dr. Jon A. Moore

== Species and taxonomy ==
The currently recognized species in this genus are:

- Anotopterus nikparini, Kukuev, 1998 (North Pacific daggertooth)
- Anotopterus pharao, Zugmayer, 1911 (daggertooth)
- Anotopterus vorax, Regan, 1913 (south ocean daggertooth)

Anotopterus has long been considered a unique taxonomic family with close affinity to the families Paralepididae and Alepisauridae. Recent Bayesian assessment of fossil records, taxonomic relationships and four key molecular markers have determined a much closer kinship between Anotopterus to basal Paralepididae, like Magnisudis spp., with the implication being that the genus Anotopterus might more appropriately be considered a member of the barracudina family, Paralepididae.

== Ecology and life history ==
The form of Anotopterus suggests that of a swift swimmer, at least of a fish that can dart through water quickly for short distances, like some of its closest relatives in Paralepididae have been reported to do. Like its close cousins, it is likely that these fishes readily avoid collecting nets at the depths they most frequently occur in the mesopelagic, especially larger individuals. Daggertooth are predators of other fishes and are prey to larger fishes including its close cousins the lancetfishes.

=== Feeding ===
Very little is known about the feeding habits of daggertooths, although they have been said to eat young Pacific salmon, barracudina, and other mesopelagic fishes and it is generally assumed that they predate the most abundant fishes available. This ignorance of diet is partly due to the potential prevalence of regurgitation among net caught specimens, where nearly 100% of net caught daggertooths were documented with completely empty stomachs, the supposed reason being the regurgitation of freshly eaten food upon capture in nets as a defense mechanism. They are likely visually based predators and adult individuals can easily engulf relatively large prey, fishes with 20–30 cm fork length, whole due to their unattached pectoral girdles and distensible stomachs. Observations of slash marks on numerous young Pacific salmon in the northern Pacific prompted an investigation into the potential impact of daggertooth depredation on young salmon stocks by assessment of the tooth marks left on the salmon and estimations of daggertooth abundance. The subsequent findings showed that slashes from failed daggertooth attacks could be distinguished from failed lancetfish attacks by the placement of the tooth marks, as daggertooths only have fang-like teeth along their upper jaw while lancetfish have fang like teeth along both the upper and lower jaws. Whether daggertooth have a significant impact on northern Pacific Salmon stock remained inconclusive.

=== Metamorphosis ===
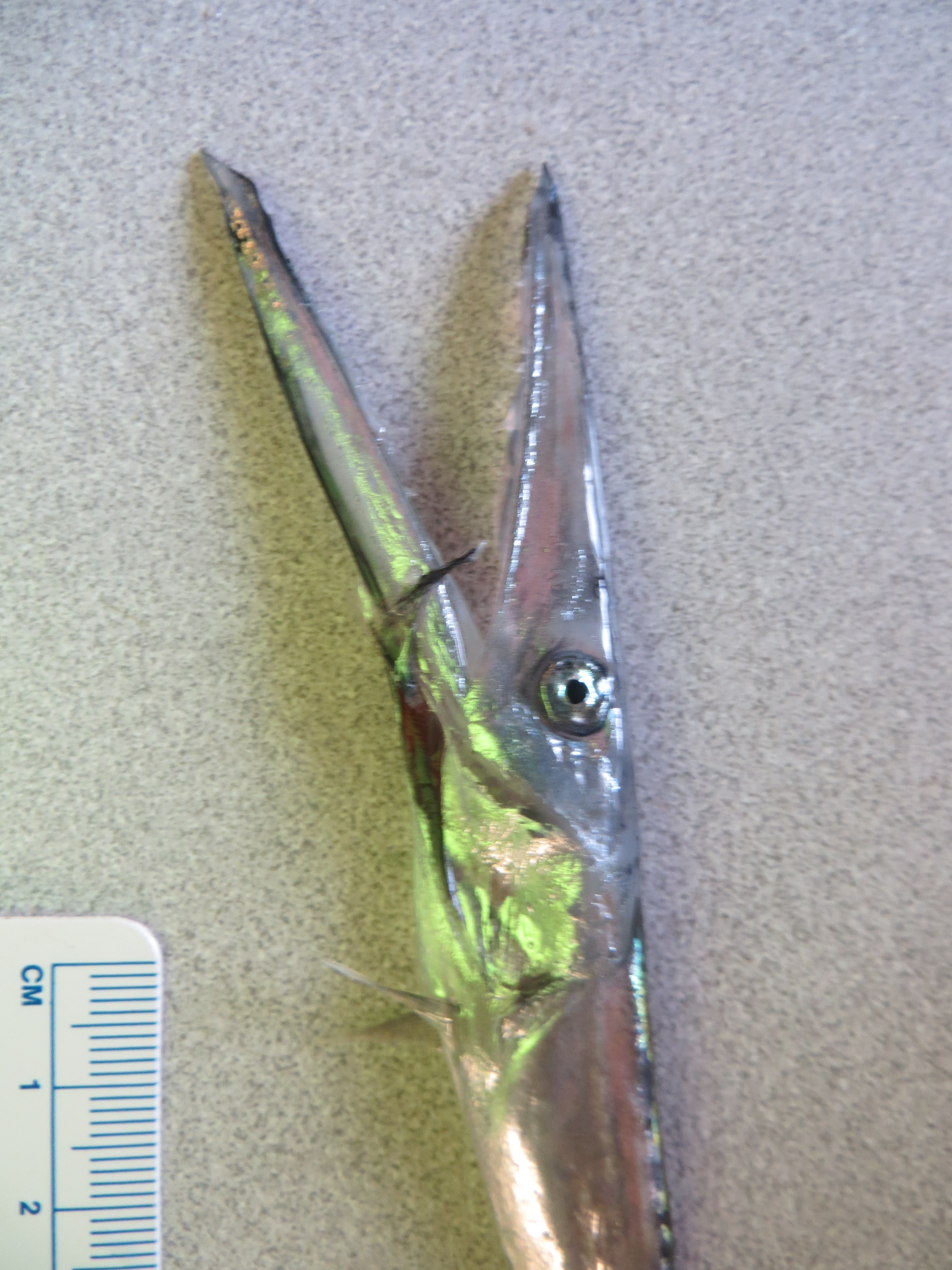
Close up of Anotopterus pharao and its "daggertooth". Collected from Bear's Seamount in the western North Atlantic. Photo by Dr. Jon A. Moore

It has been noted that as daggertooths age their teeth begin to diminish and their stomachs and intestines atrophy while their gonads increase greatly in size. This was discovered in 1971, after German ichthyologist Günther Maul caught a black toothless A. pharao off Madeira that measured 75.9 cm. It was posited that there may be a vertical downwards migration at this final short stage of life. The reduced light at this increased depth may have selected for the black colouration. As Anotopterus quickly shed and replace their teeth, it was hypothesized that by halting the replacement of shed teeth (which is potentially linked to the reduced exposure to Vitamin D at increased depths), toothlessness occurs quite rapidly. The phenomenon of a downwards migration paired with a colour change to black is also seen in species such as the common fangtooth, although during this process, that species develops fangs for feeding instead of losing them. This observed ontogenetic shift hints to a potentially semelparous reproductive modality, while this aspect of life history has not yet been fully substantiated. Like their relatives, it is thought that daggertooths are simultaneous hermaphrodites while their spawning and actual reproductive behavior remains a mystery.

=== Distribution ===
Hubbs et al., (1953) speculated that daggertooths have an anti-tropical distribution and live in temperate and boreal latitudes at either pole. Later work investigating the distributional overlap between daggertooths and Pacific salmon (Oncorhynchus sp.) seemed to verify this assertion although some lack of findings pointed to a spotty distribution in certain pole-ward regions. Counter to this assumption, however, are the findings of Kim et al. (1997) who discovered that daggertooths can comprise a sizable portion of the diets of deep diving tuna in certain areas of the tropical, west Pacific. It is possible that the latitudinal distribution of daggertooths is anti-tropical in the epipelagic with preferred temperatures being available at depth worldwide, which would also explain the conservation of such few species with near global distributions.
