= Shorthorn fangtooth =

Scientific classification
- Kingdom: Animalia
- Phylum: Chordata
- Class: Actinopterygii
- Order: Trachichthyiformes
- Family: Anoplogastridae
- Genus: Anoplogaster
- Species: A. brachycera

Binomial name
- Anoplogaster brachycera Kotlyar, 1986

Species of fish

The shorthorn fangtooth (Anoplogaster brachycera) is a species of fangtooth found in the tropical waters of the Atlantic and Pacific Oceans at depths down to 1,500 metres (4,900 ft).

== Etymology ==
The genus name Anoplogaster comes from Ancient Greek ἄνοπλος (ánoplos), meaning "shieldless", and γαστήρ (gastḗr), meaning "belly". The specific epithet brachycera comes from Ancient Greek βραχύς (brakhús), meaning "short", and κέρας (kéras), meaning "horn".

== Information ==
This species grows to a length of 6 centimetres (2.4 in) SL. The shorthorn fangtooth is known to be found in a marine environment within a bathypelagic depth range of about 0 – 1500 meters. This species is native to a deep-water area. The maximum recorded length of this species as an unsexed male is about 6 centimeters or about 2.36 inches. The shorthorn fangtooth is native to the areas of Pacific and Atlantic oceans, tropical waters, the Sulu Sea, the western Pacific, the Gulf of Mexico, Bahamas Islands, the western Atlantic, and off of the southeastern United States of America.

== Notes ==
- Froese, Rainer; Pauly, Daniel (eds.). "Anoplogaster brachycera". FishBase. October 2012 version.
