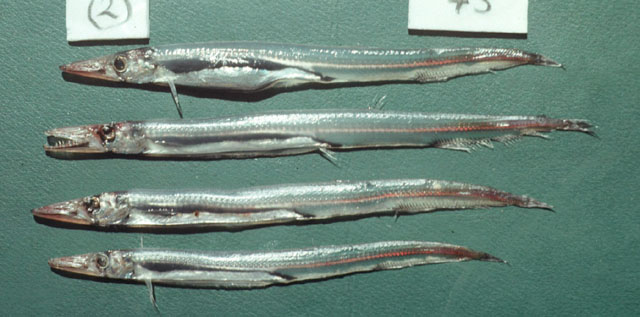
- Japanese Barracudina (L. japonica)

Scientific classification
- Domain: Eukaryota
- Kingdom: Animalia
- Phylum: Chordata
- Class: Actinopterygii
- Order: Aulopiformes
- Family: Paralepididae
- Genus: Lestrolepis; Harry, 1953

= Lestrolepis =

Genus of fishes

Lestrolepis is a genus of barracudina.

== Species ==
There are currently four recognized species in this genus:

- Lestrolepis intermedia (Poey, 1868)
- Lestrolepis japonica (S. Tanaka (I), 1908) (Japanese barracudina)
- Lestrolepis luetkeni (Ege, 1933) (Naked barracuda)
- Lestrolepis pofi (Harry, 1953) (Christmas Island pike smelt)
