= Lestidiops =

Scientific classification
- Kingdom: Animalia
- Phylum: Chordata
- Class: Actinopterygii
- Order: Aulopiformes
- Family: Paralepididae
- Genus: Lestidiops; C. L. Hubbs, 1916

Genus of fishes

Lestidiops is a genus of barracudinas.

== Species ==
There are currently 15 recognized species in this genus:

- Lestidiops affinis (Ege, 1933) (Barracudina)
- Lestidiops bathyopteryx (Fowler, 1944)
- Lestidiops cadenati (Maul, 1962)
- Lestidiops distans (Ege, 1953)
- Lestidiops extrema (Ege, 1953)
- Lestidiops gracilis (Ege, 1953)
- Lestidiops indopacifica (Ege, 1953) (Indo-Pacific barracudina)
- Lestidiops jayakari (Boulenger, 1889)
  - Lestidiops jayakari jayakari (Boulenger, 1889) (Pacific barracudina)
  - Lestidiops jayakari pseudosphyraenoides (Ege, 1918)
- Lestidiops mirabilis (Ege, 1933) (Strange pike smelt)
- Lestidiops neles (Harry, 1953)
- Lestidiops pacificus (A. E. Parr, 1931)
- Lestidiops ringens (D. S. Jordan & C. H. Gilbert, 1880) (Slender barracudina)
- Lestidiops similis (Ege, 1933)
- Lestidiops sphyraenopsis C. L. Hubbs, 1916
- Lestidiops sphyrenoides (A. Risso, 1820)
