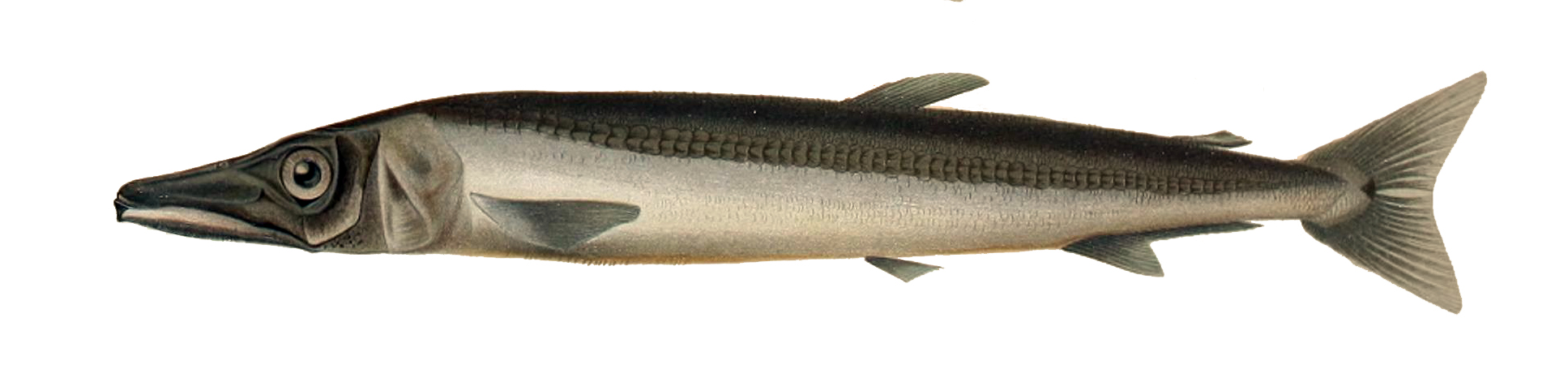
- Magnisudis atlantica

Scientific classification
- Domain: Eukaryota
- Kingdom: Animalia
- Phylum: Chordata
- Class: Actinopterygii
- Order: Aulopiformes
- Family: Paralepididae
- Genus: Magnisudis; Harry, 1953

= Magnisudis =

Genus of fishes

Magnisudis is a genus of barracudinas.

== Species ==
There are currently three recognized species in this genus:

- Magnisudis atlantica (Krøyer, 1868) (duckbill barracudina)
- Magnisudis indica (Ege, 1953)
- Magnisudis prionosa (Rofen, 1963) (southern barracudina)
