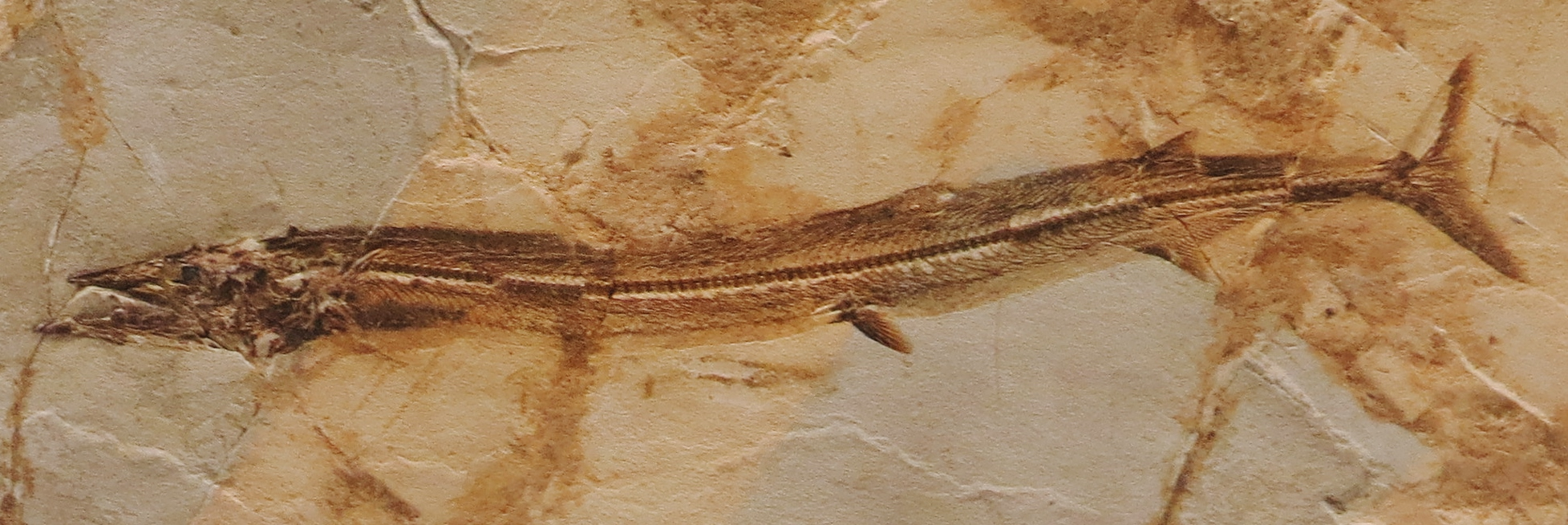
- Specimen of H. esocinus, Museo di Storia Naturale di Verona

Scientific classification
- Kingdom: Animalia
- Phylum: Chordata
- Class: Actinopterygii
- Order: Aulopiformes
- Family: Paralepididae
- Subfamily: †Holosteinae
- Genus: †Holosteus; Agassiz, 1835
- Species: †H. esocinus

Binomial name
- †Holosteus esocinus Agassiz, 1835

= Holosteus =

Holosteus Temporal range: Early Eocene, 56–49 Ma

Extinct genus of fishes

Holosteus (meaning "complete skeleton") is a genus of prehistoric barracudina known from the Eocene of Europe. It contains a single species, H. esocinus from the Early Eocene of Italy (Monte Bolca). Indeterminate specimens are also known from the earlier Eocene-aged Fur Formation of Denmark.

It was previously presumed to be a needlefish by Louis Agassiz or potentially a lanternfish by Arthur Smith Woodward, but is now known to be one of the few barracudinas known from the fossil record. Due to several unique morphological traits, it appears to belong to its own subfamily Holosteinae, alongside the closely related Pavlovichthys from the Early Oligocene of eastern Europe. Pavlovichthys was previously synonymized with Holosteus, extending the range of the latter genus to the Oligocene, but more recent studies have again split the two genera.

Due to the excellent preservation of specimens, the coloration of Holosteus is known; it appears to have had a dark-pigmented band extending across the dorsum from the head to caudal fin. This coloration is also seen in modern barracudinas such as Lestidium.

It is the only barracudina known to have inhabited a shallow-water environment, as modern barracudinas are primarily deepwater fish. Like modern barracudinas, it was likely an ambush predator, and the first member of the family known to have evolved such a lifestyle.
