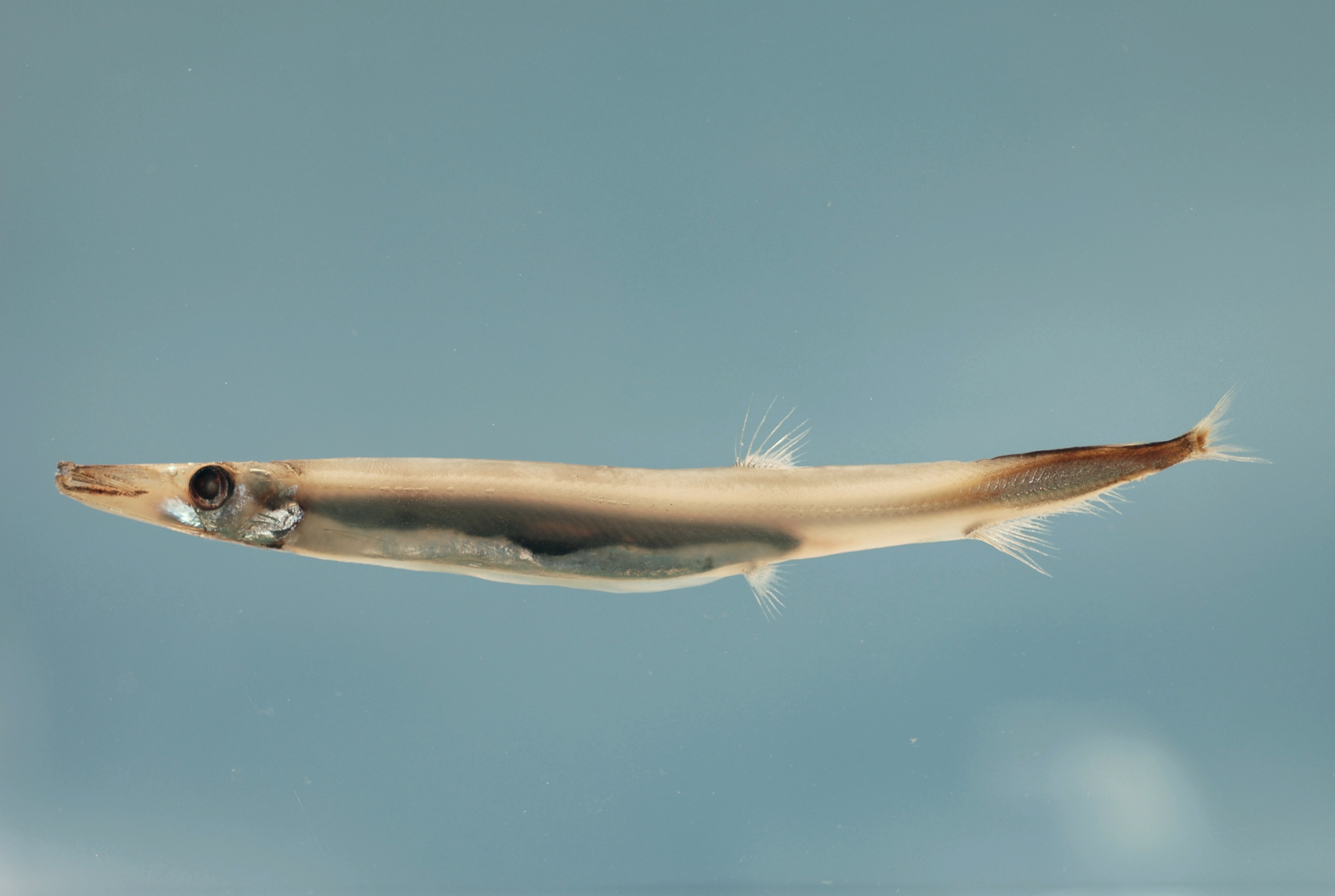
- Atlantic Barracudina (L. atlanticum)

Conservation status
- Least Concern (IUCN 3.1)

Scientific classification
- Kingdom: Animalia
- Phylum: Chordata
- Class: Actinopterygii
- Order: Aulopiformes
- Family: Paralepididae
- Genus: Lestidium
- Species: L. atlanticum

Binomial name
- Lestidium atlanticum Borodin, 1928

Synonyms
- Lestidium elegans Parr, 1928

= Lestidium atlanticum =

Species of fish

Lestidium atlanticum, the Atlantic barracudina, is a species of fish. It is widely distributed in tropical and subtropical waters of the three major oceans. This species reaches a length of 25 cm (9.8 in).

== See also ==
- List of fish of the Mediterranean Sea
