= Dolichosudis =

Conservation status
- Least Concern (IUCN 3.1)

Scientific classification
- Kingdom: Animalia
- Phylum: Chordata
- Class: Actinopterygii
- Order: Aulopiformes
- Family: Paralepididae
- Genus: Dolichosudis; Post, 1969
- Species: D. fuliginosa

Binomial name
- Dolichosudis fuliginosa Post, 1969

Species of fish

Dolichosudis fuliginosa is a species of barracudina found in the Atlantic Ocean and Western Pacific Ocean at a depths of around 1,200 metres (3,900 ft). This species grows to a length of 24.4 centimetres (9.6 in) SL. This species is the only known member of its genus.
