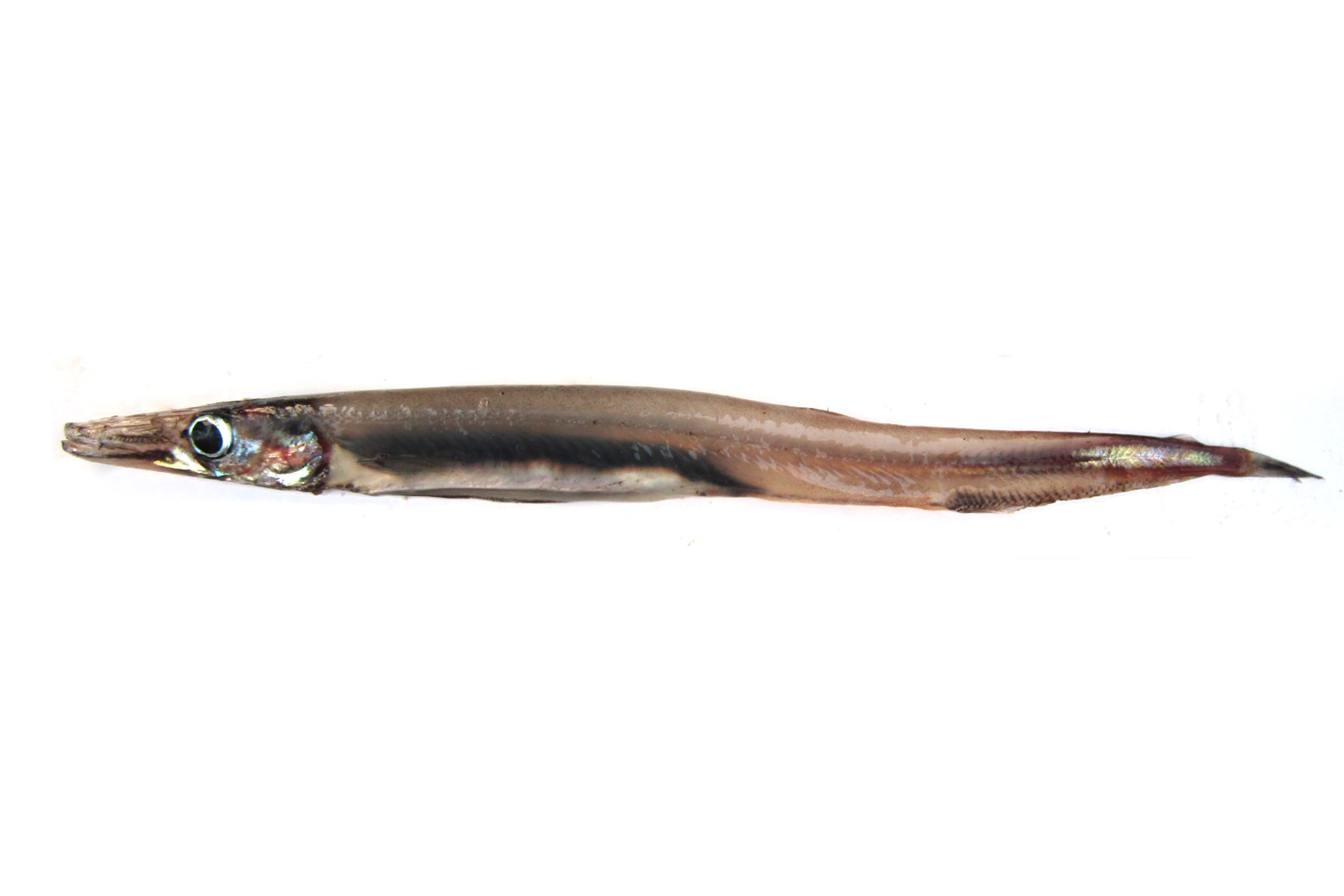
- Stemonosudis macrura

Scientific classification
- Kingdom: Animalia
- Phylum: Chordata
- Class: Actinopterygii
- Order: Aulopiformes
- Family: Paralepididae
- Genus: Stemonosudis; Harry, 1951

= Stemonosudis =

Genus of fishes

Stemonosudis is a genus of barracudinas. These are deep water fish that resemble but are not related to barracuda. They are long and slender with pointed snouts. They are hunters with large eyes and sharp teeth. Unlike barracuda, these fish have no swim bladder.

== Species ==
There are currently 11 recognized species in this genus:

- Stemonosudis bullisi Rofen, 1963
- Stemonosudis distans (Ege, 1957)
- Stemonosudis elegans (Ege, 1933) (Tailspot barracudina)
- Stemonosudis elongata (Ege, 1933)
- Stemonosudis gracilis (Ege, 1933)
- Stemonosudis intermedia (Ege, 1933)
- Stemonosudis macrura (Ege, 1933)
- Stemonosudis miscella (Ege, 1933)
- Stemonosudis molesta (N. B. Marshall, 1955)
- Stemonosudis rothschildi Richards, 1967 (Rothschild's barracudina)
- Stemonosudis siliquiventer Post, 1970
