= Anotopterus nikparini =

Conservation status
- Least Concern (IUCN 3.1)

Scientific classification
- Kingdom: Animalia
- Phylum: Chordata
- Class: Actinopterygii
- Order: Aulopiformes
- Family: Anotopteridae
- Genus: Anotopterus
- Species: A. nikparini

Binomial name
- Anotopterus nikparini Kukuev, 1998

Species of fish

The North Pacific Daggertooth, Anotopterus nikparini is a species of fish in the family Anotopteridae, the daggertooths. It is native to the northern Pacific Ocean, where it occurs as far north as the Bering Sea and as far south as Japan and Baja California.

== Etymology ==
The fish is named in honor of ichthyologist Nikolai Vasil’evich Parin (1932–2012), of the Russian Academy of Sciences.

== Distribution ==
This fish can be found near the surface to depths below 2000 meters. Populations in colder regions are mainly larger, older adults.

== Food chain ==
This species feeds on molluscs, crustaceans, marine worms, salps, and fish. It is an important predator of Pacific salmon. In turn, it is a prey item for whales and large fish such as albacore, lancetfish, halibut, steelhead, pomfret, and blue shark.
