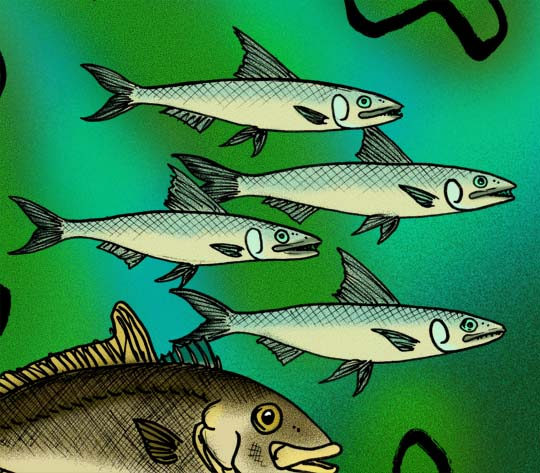
- Comparison of D. defensor and Seriola sanctaebarbarae

Scientific classification
- Kingdom: Animalia
- Phylum: Chordata
- Class: Actinopterygii
- Order: Aulopiformes
- Family: Paralepididae
- Genus: †Drimys; Jordan, 1925
- Species: †D. defensor

Binomial name
- †Drimys defensor Jordan, 1925

= Drimys (fish) =

Drimys Temporal range: Late Miocene (Tortonian), 11.6–7.3 Ma

Extinct genus of fishes

Drimys defensor is an extinct species of barracudina from the Late Miocene-aged Monterey Formation of Southern California, USA. It is known from a fossil specimen discovered in Tortonian-aged diatomite deposits near Lompoc. It was closely related to species of the extinct genus Holosteus.
