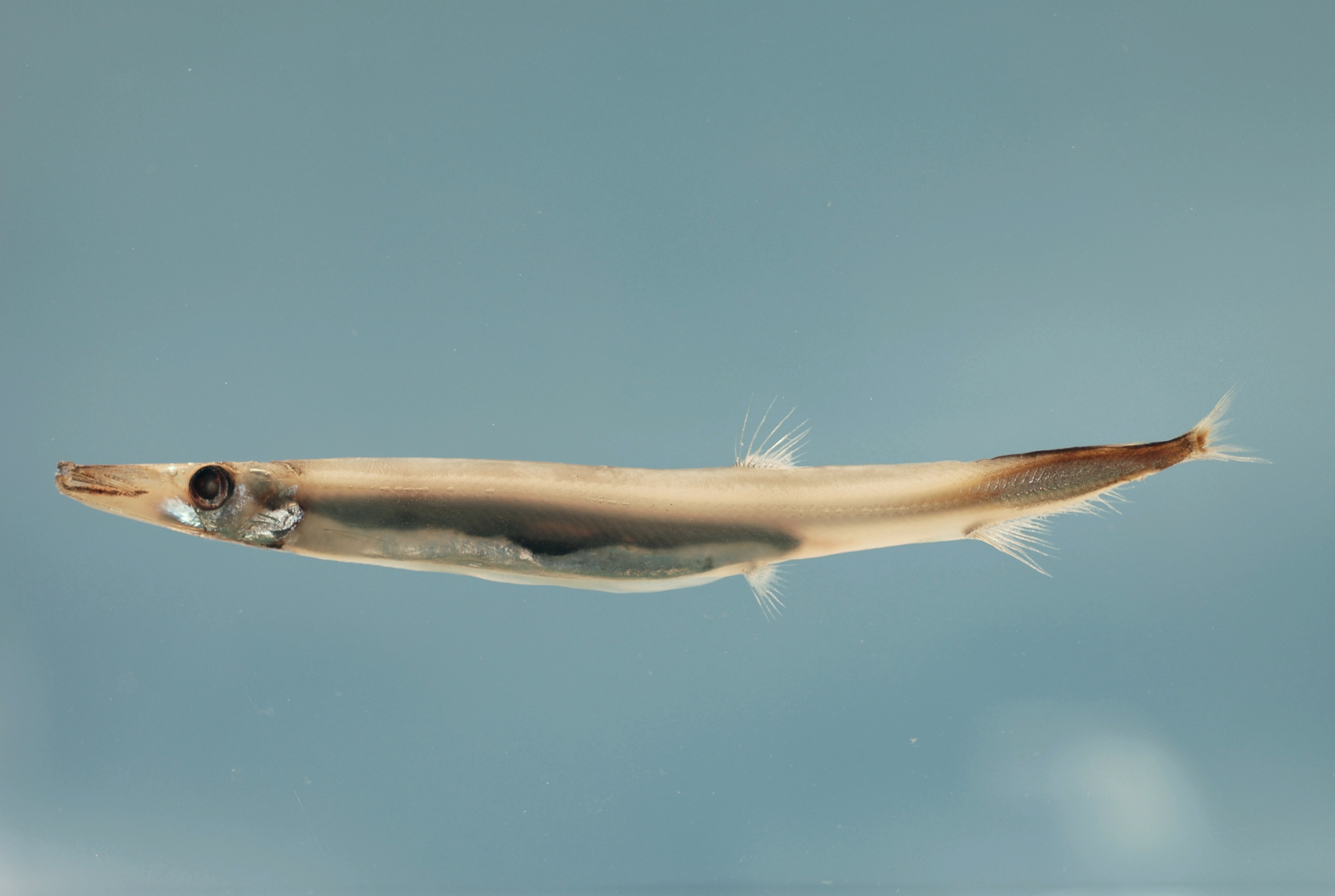
- Atlantic Barracudina (L. atlanticum)

Scientific classification
- Kingdom: Animalia
- Phylum: Chordata
- Class: Actinopterygii
- Order: Aulopiformes
- Family: Paralepididae
- Genus: Lestidium; C. H. Gilbert, 1905

Type species
- Lestidium nudum C.H. Gilbert, 1905

= Lestidium =

Genus of fishes

Lestidium is a genus of barracudina. They are sometimes referred to as pike smelt.

== Species ==
There are currently three recognized species in this genus:

- Lestidium atlanticum Borodin, 1928 (Atlantic barracudina)
- Lestidium australis H. C. Ho, Graham & Russell, 2020
- Lestidium longilucifer H. C. Ho, Graham & Russell, 2020
- Lestidium nudum C. H. Gilbert, 1905 (Deep water pike smelt)
- Lestidium prolixum Harry, 1953
- Lestidium rofeni H. C. Ho, Graham & Russell, 2020
