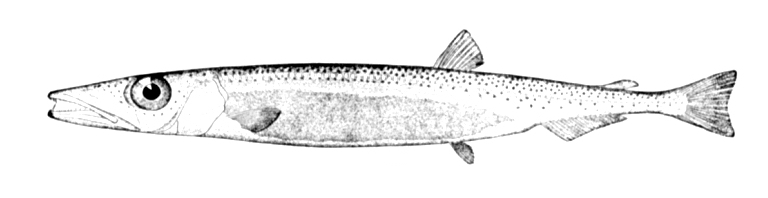
- Sharpchin Barracudina (P. coregonoides)

Scientific classification
- Kingdom: Animalia
- Phylum: Chordata
- Class: Actinopterygii
- Order: Aulopiformes
- Family: Paralepididae
- Genus: Paralepis; G. Cuvier, 1816

= Paralepis =

Genus of fishes

Paralepis is a genus of barracudinas.

== Species ==
There are currently four recognized species in this genus:

- Paralepis brevirostris (A. E. Parr, 1928)
- Paralepis coregonoides A. Risso, 1820 (Sharpchin barracudina)
- Paralepis elongata (A. B. Brauer, 1906)
- Paralepis speciosa Bellotti, 1878
