= Notolepis =

Scientific classification
- Domain: Eukaryota
- Kingdom: Animalia
- Phylum: Chordata
- Class: Actinopterygii
- Order: Aulopiformes
- Family: Paralepididae
- Genus: Notolepis; Dollo, 1908

Genus of fishes

Notolepis is a genus of barracudinas.

== Species ==
There are currently two recognized species in this genus:

- Notolepis annulata Post, 1978 (Ringed barracudina)
- Notolepis coatsi Dollo, 1908 (Antarctic jonasfish)
