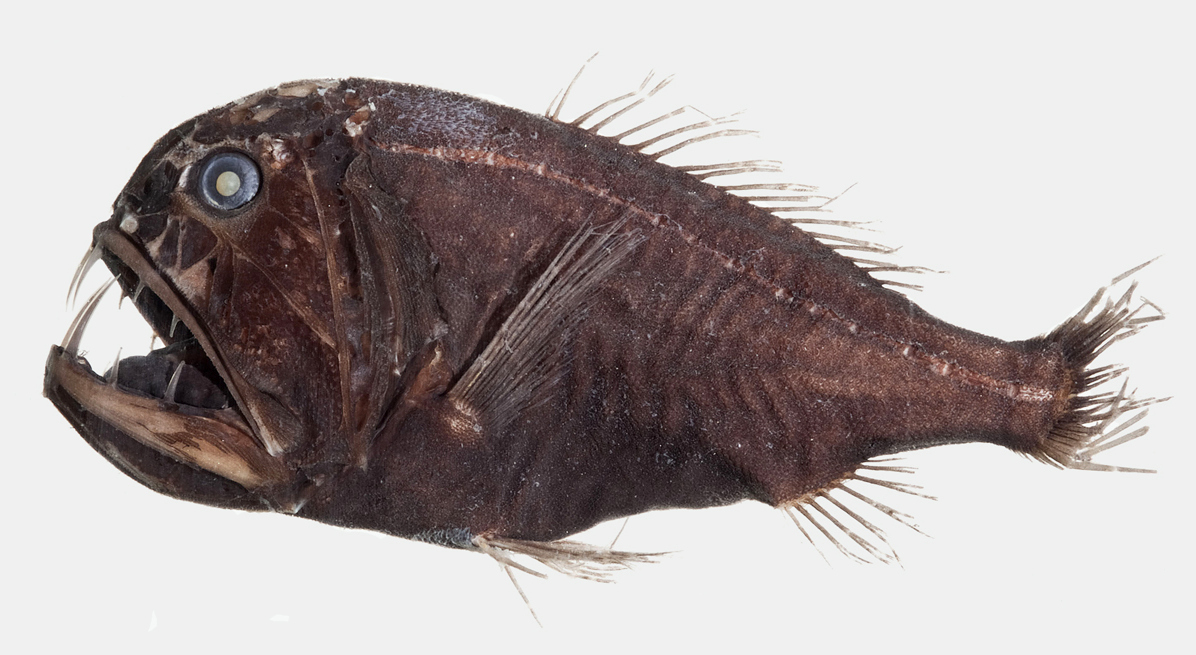

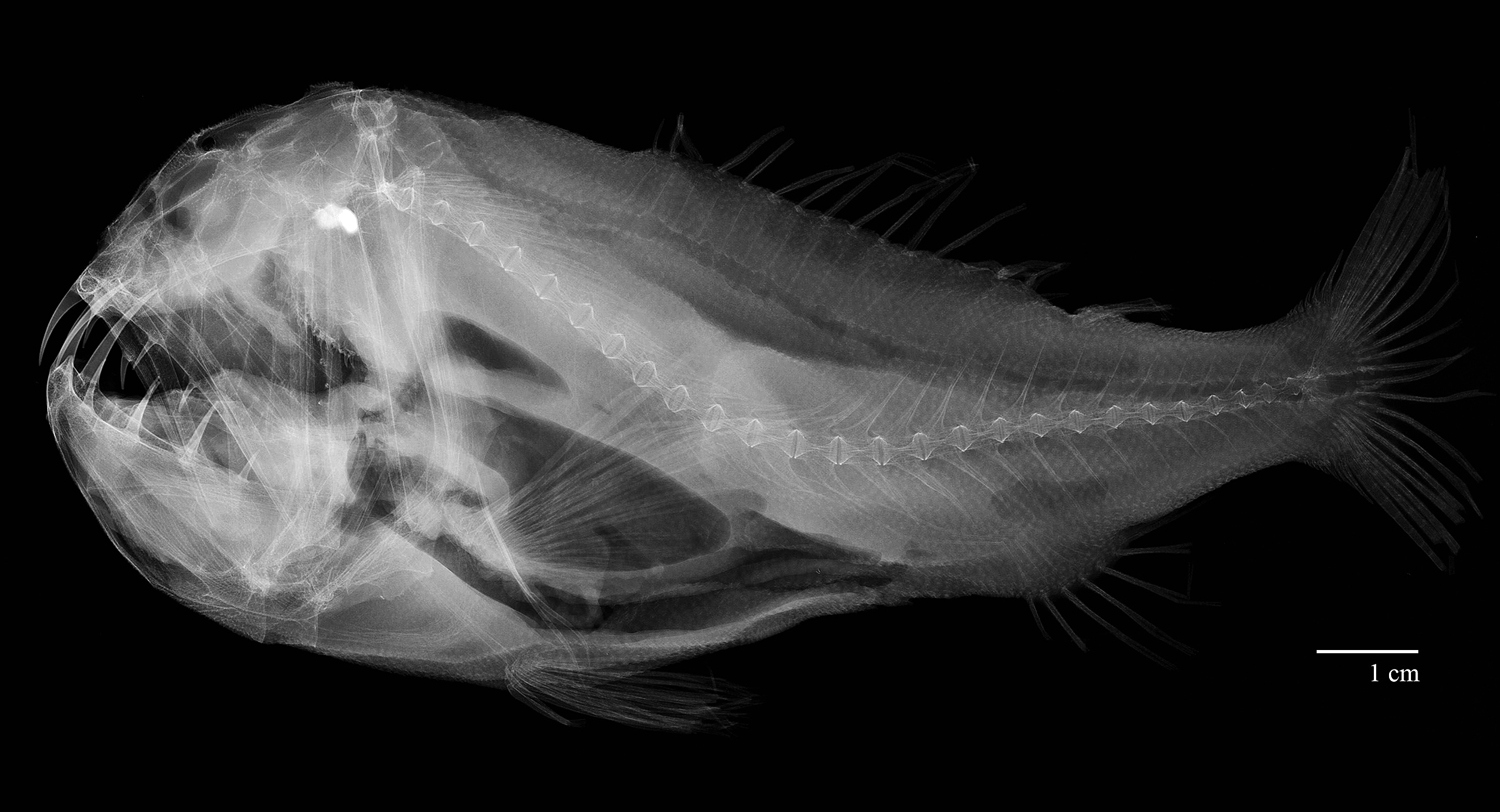
- Anoplogaster cornuta, conventional and X-ray images

Conservation status
- Least Concern (IUCN 3.1)

Scientific classification
- Domain: Eukaryota
- Kingdom: Animalia
- Phylum: Chordata
- Class: Actinopterygii
- Order: Trachichthyiformes
- Family: Anoplogastridae
- Genus: Anoplogaster
- Species: A. cornuta

Binomial name
- Anoplogaster cornuta (Valenciennes, 1833)

= Anoplogaster cornuta =

Common fangtooth

Species of fish

Anoplogaster cornuta, the common fangtooth, is a species of deep sea fish found in temperate and tropical oceans worldwide. It is found at depths of from 2 to 5,000 metres (10 to 16,400 ft) with the adults usually found from 500 to 5,000 metres (1,640 to 16,400 ft) and the young usually found near the surface. This species grows to a total length of about 18 cm (7 in). While a source of food for pelagic carnivorous fishes, this species is of no interest for human fisheries.

== Description ==
The common fangtooth has a distinctive appearance and grows to a total length of about 18 cm (7 in). Adults are dark brown to black, the head is very large, bony and finely sculptured but does not bear any spines. The eye is small and the gill rakers have bony bases and are tooth-like. The body is deepest just behind the head, tapering rapidly to the caudal peduncle. The mouth is well-armed with sharp fangs and the skin is granular. The dorsal fin has no spines and 17 to 20 soft rays while the anal fin has no spines and 7 to 9 soft rays. The lateral line takes the form of an open groove, bridged in places by overlapping scales. Many deep sea fish do not have swim bladders, but the common fangtooth does.

Juveniles look very different from adults, so much so that they were at one time believed to be a different species. The juveniles were first described as Anoplogaster cornuta by the French zoologist Achille Valenciennes in 1833, and it was fifty years later that the adults were described and given the name Caulolepis longidens. Not until 1955 was it appreciated that the two were the same species. The juveniles are a much paler colour and somewhat triangular in cross section. They have several long spines on the head, large eyes and slender, pointed gill rakers, but have small teeth and lack the fangs of the adult fish. The skin is largely unpigmented and clad in unpigmented scales, but there is a black patch on the belly formed by dark-coloured cup-like scales. As the juvenile reaches adulthood, it becomes darker as black scales grow to cover its still-unpigmented skin.

== Distribution and habitat ==
The common fangtooth has a global distribution being found in tropical and temperate waters in both the eastern and western Atlantic Ocean, the Indian Ocean and the Pacific Ocean. Off the western seaboard of America its range extends from British Columbia southwards to south of the equator. It is a pelagic fish occurring between 2 and 5,000 metres (10 and 16,400 ft), with adults between 500 and 5,000 metres (1,640 and 16,400 ft); adults occur in deep water and are often caught in trawls at about 2,000 m (6,560 ft). Juveniles are found at lesser depths.

== Behaviour ==
The common fangtooth is a predator and feeds on other fish, crustaceans and cephalopods. They are themselves preyed on by such fish as tuna, marlin and albacore. It is a schooling fish and is often found in small groups, though it may be solitary. Off the west coast of North America, the common fangtooth seems to breed in the summer months. The fish are oviparous and the developing larvae are planktonic. From examination of the otoliths (bony structures behind the eyes), it appears that this fish lives for at least three years.

== Research ==
These fish were tested to see how pressure affects their respiration as compared to other fish. Researchers found that these fish are able to regulate their respiratory system according to their environment and that the respiration rate was directly proportional to the size of the fish.

Although almost no light penetrates to the deep sea from the surface, the common fangtooth has evolved features that make it practically invisible. Like other deep sea fish, it needs to avoid being seen by predators, some of which hunt for prey by creating their own light by means of bioluminescence. The common fangtooth achieves invisibility by absorbing light with great efficiency. The pigment melanin is crammed into granules which are grouped into melanophores which cover virtually the whole of the dermis. This absorbs almost all of the incoming light, and any remaining light that scatters sideways is absorbed by neighbouring granules. Altogether, the absorption of light is 99.5% efficient, a fact that makes photographing this fish in its natural habitat very difficult.
