= Sudis (stake) =

Roman legionary field fortification

The sudis (pl.: sudes) was a stake carried by Roman legionaries for employment as a field fortification, sometimes also called vallus. It is frequently, but incorrectly, called a pilum murale (lit. 'wall spear'). Typically, two such stakes were carried by each soldier.

== Construction ==
Each stake was made of hardwood, usually oak, about 150–180 cm (5–6 ft) long and about 50–100 mm (2–4 in) wide at the thickest point. Square in section, the shape tapers to a point at both ends. The central part is narrowed in a way that strongly suggests the function of a handle, although this may not be its actual purpose. Examples that have been found are rough hewn.

== Usage ==
It seems clear that the stakes were used to form a temporary defence. However, the exact manner in which stakes were used is the subject of debate among experts.

It is possible that the stakes were incorporated into the ramparts of a Roman marching camp (castra). Projecting from the ramparts at an angle, they would present a barrier to an attacker attempting to climb up. Alternatively, they could have been placed vertically at the top of the rampart as a fence. Experiments with reconstructions have been disappointing in that such barriers are not strong, as the symmetry of the stakes makes them easy to pull out of the ground.

It has been proposed that the stakes were lashed in pairs at intervals along a log or beam to form a Cheval de frise. This could be used, for example, as a moveable barrier to bar a gateway. Alternatively, three stakes might be roped together into a defence resembling the Czech hedgehog—a sort of giant caltrop. Defences of this type, employed en masse, can be pushed aside only with difficulty and cannot be collapsed. The advantage of such suggested modes of use is that they are consistent with the symmetry of the stakes and account for the "hand grip" at the centre which is required to bind the stakes together.

In the Battle of Mount Algidus (458 BC), Cincinnatus ordered his men to provide twelve valli each, and used them to build a fortification around the camp of the Aequi, who were, at the time, surrounding a Roman camp.

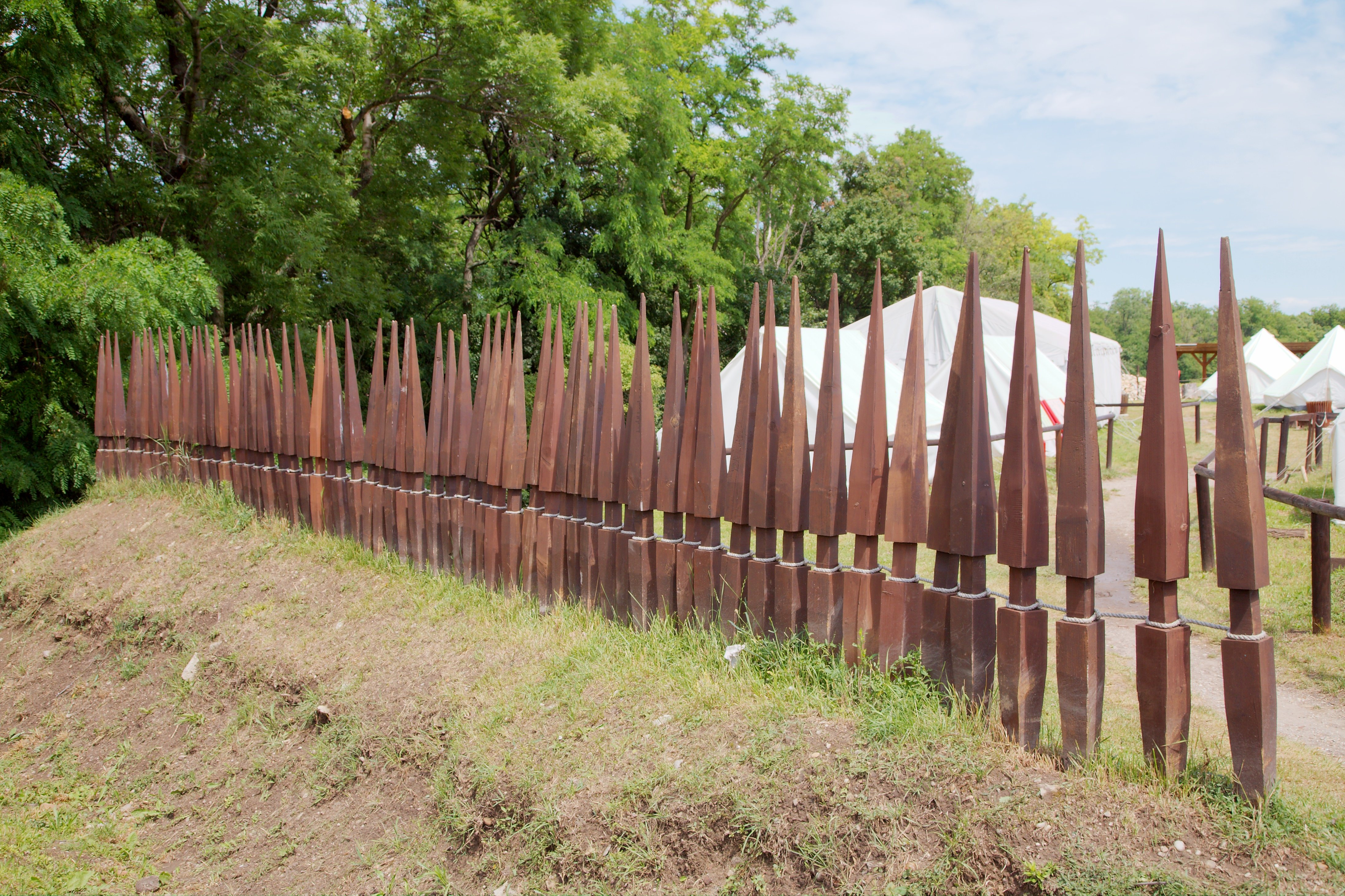
Sudes placed along a rampart and tied together with rope

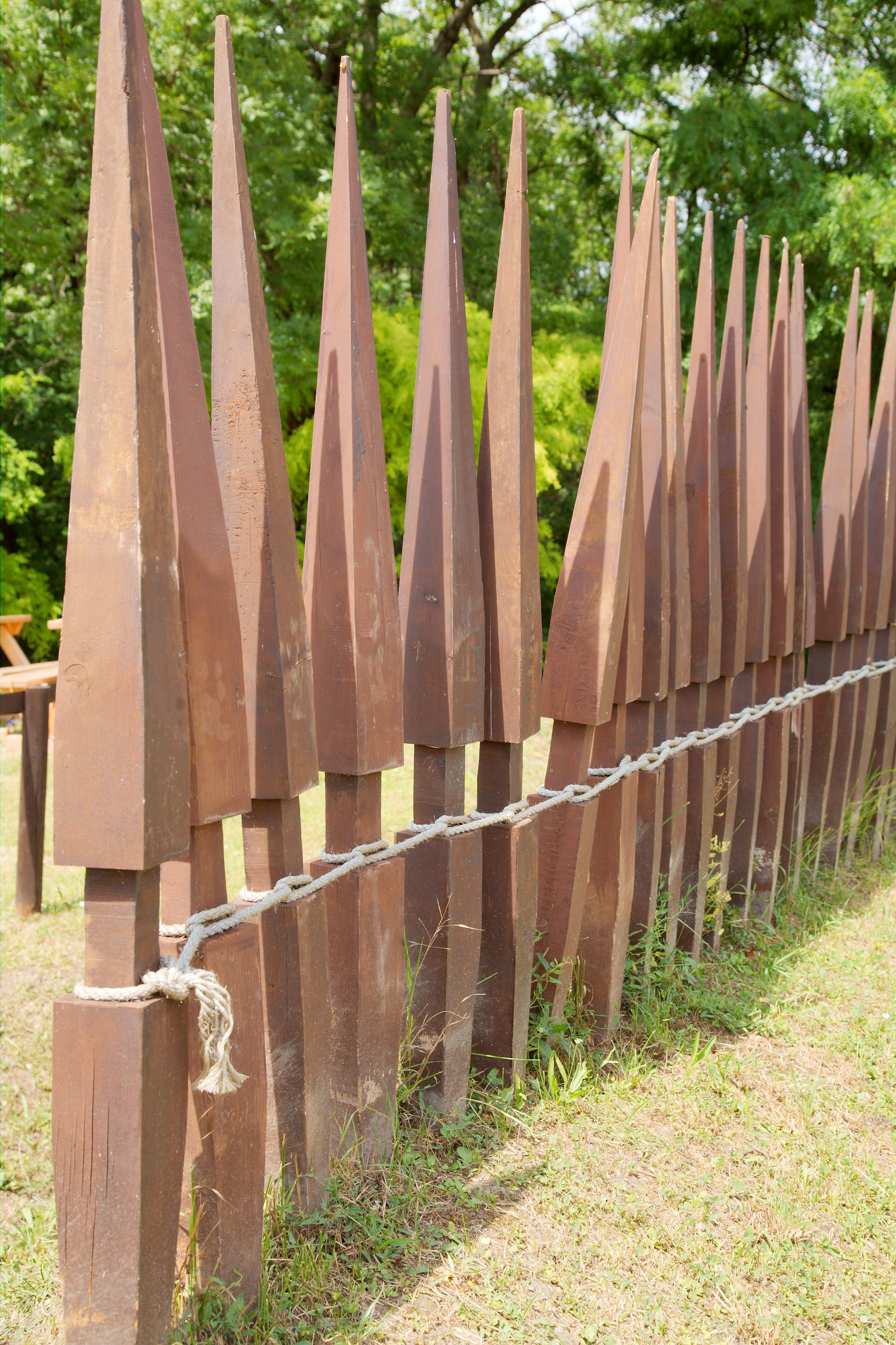

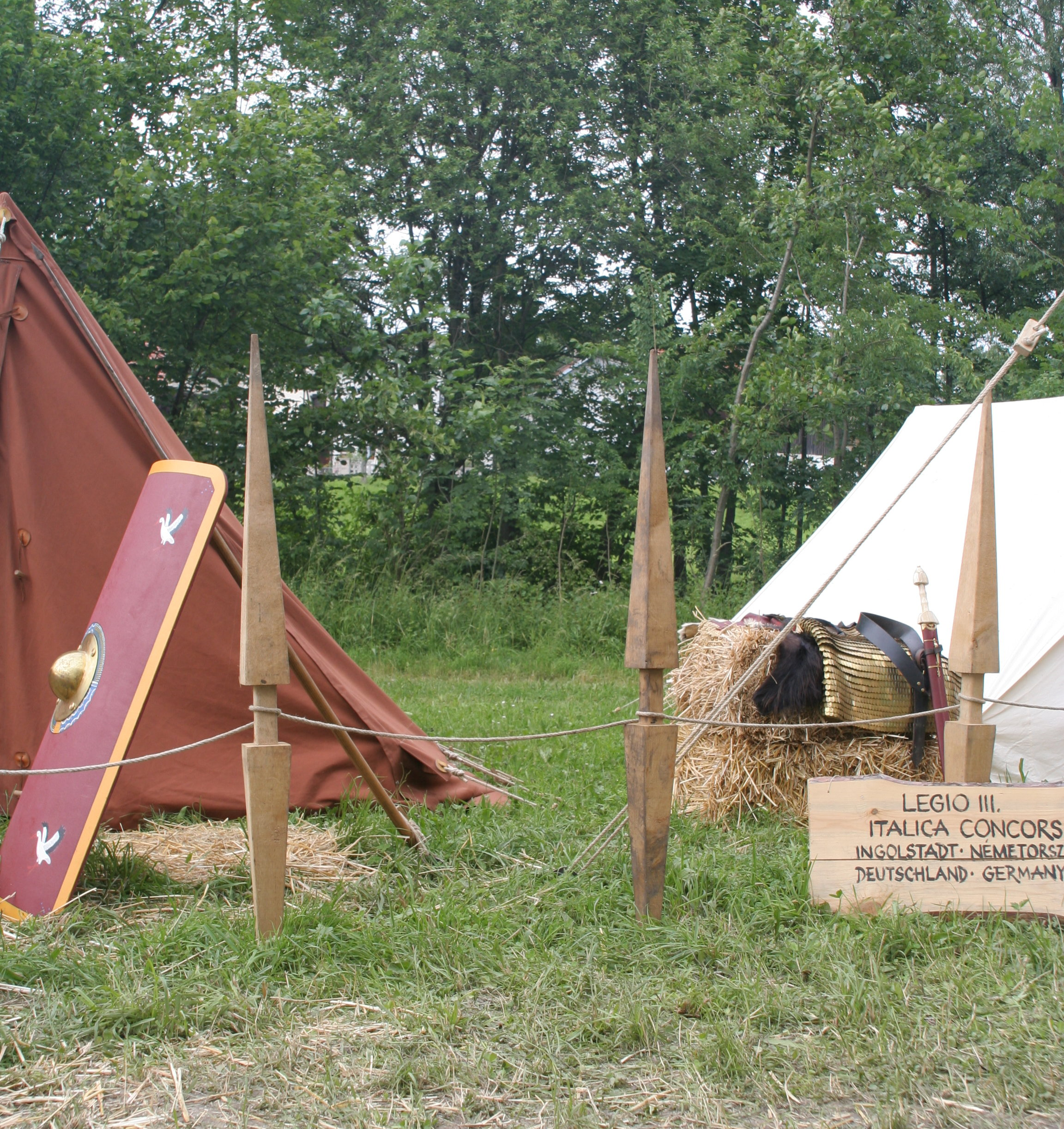
Sudes used as a simple picket fence

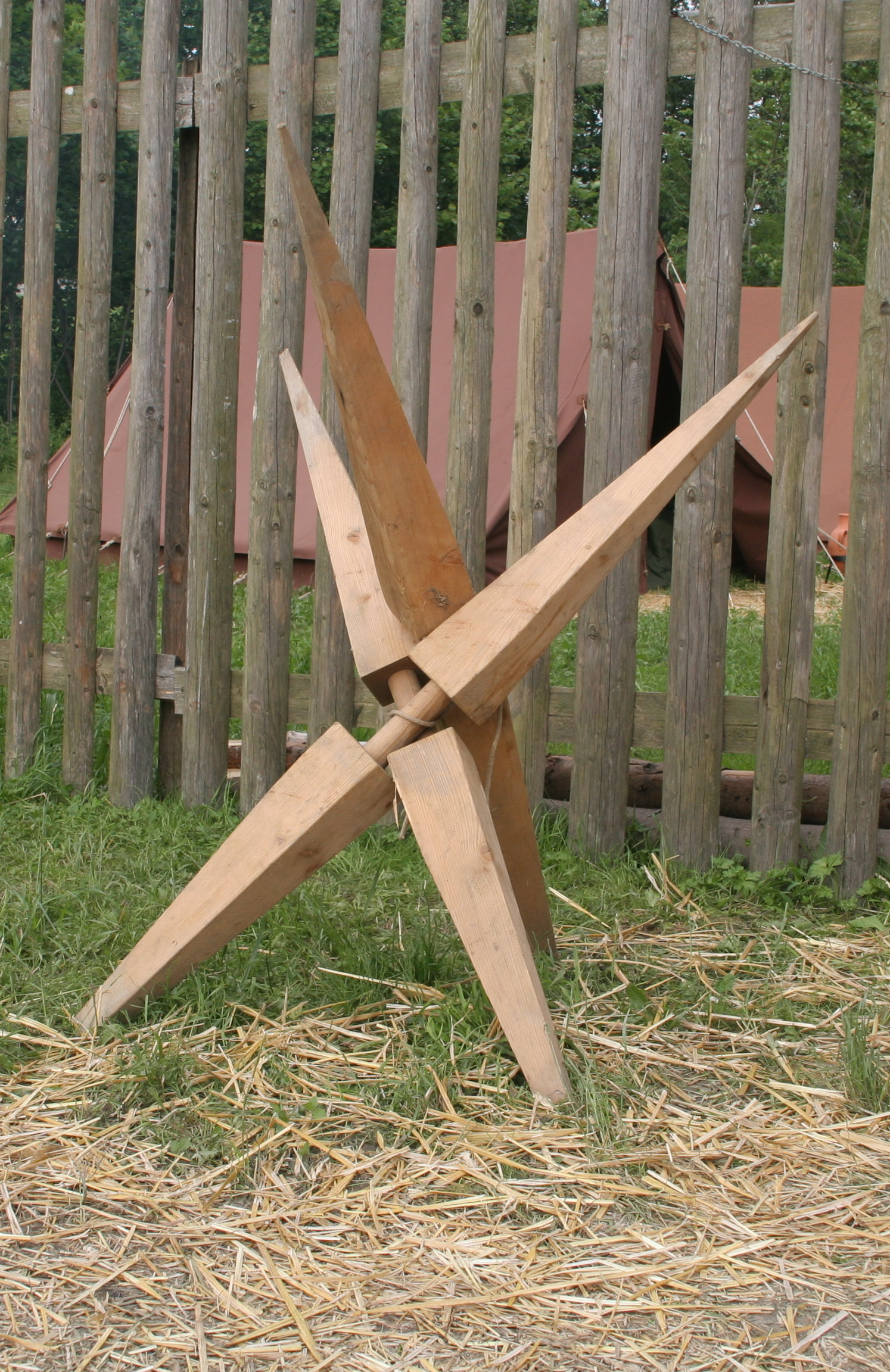
Sudes combined to form a Czech hedgehog
