= Macroparalepis =

Scientific classification
- Kingdom: Animalia
- Phylum: Chordata
- Class: Actinopterygii
- Order: Aulopiformes
- Family: Paralepididae
- Genus: Macroparalepis; E. M. Burton, 1934

Genus of fishes

Macroparalepis is a genus of barracudinas.

== Species ==
There are currently six recognized species in this genus:

- Macroparalepis affinis Ege, 1933
- Macroparalepis brevis Ege, 1933
- Macroparalepis danae Ege, 1933
- Macroparalepis johnfitchi (Rofen, 1960)
- Macroparalepis macrogeneion Post, 1973 (longfin barracudina)
- Macroparalepis nigra (Maul, 1965)
