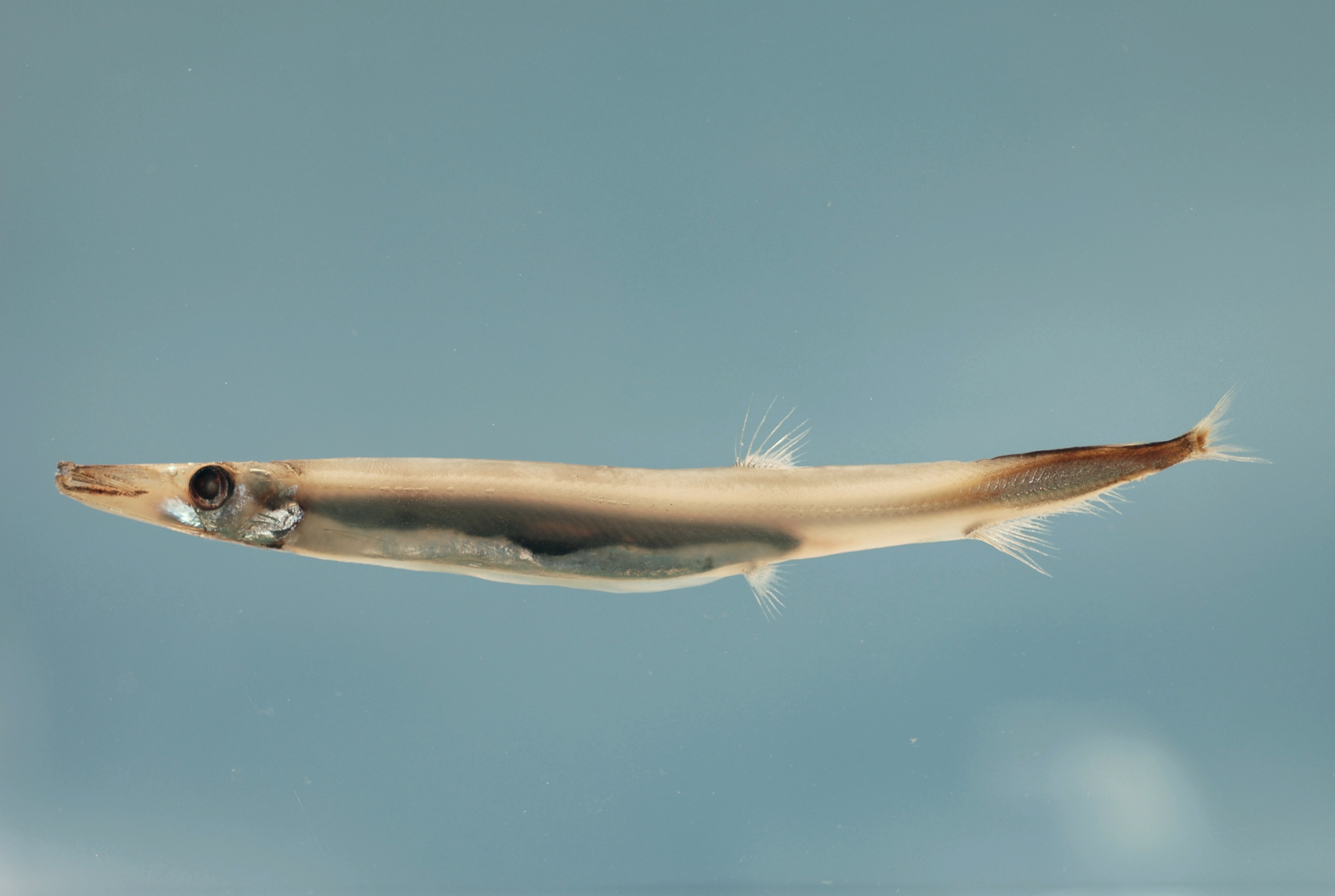
- Lestidium atlanticum

Scientific classification
- Kingdom: Animalia
- Phylum: Chordata
- Class: Actinopterygii
- Division: Teleostei
- Order: Aulopiformes
- Family: Paralepididae

Genera
- Arctozenus; Dolichosudis; Lestidiops; Lestidium; Lestrolepis; Macroparalepis; Magnisudis; Notolepis; Paralepis; Stemonosudis; Sudis; Uncisudis †Holosteus †Drimys †Pavlovichthys

= Barracudina =

Barracudinas Temporal range: Ypresian-Holocene

Family of fishes

Barracudinas are any member of the marine mesopelagic fish family Paralepididae: 50 or so extant species are found almost worldwide in deep waters. Several genera, including Holosteus and Drimys, are known only from fossils dating back to the Ypresian epoch.

The generic name Paralepis (for which the family is named) is from Greek - para meaning "near", lepis meaning "scaled".

== Description ==
Barracudinas are elongated, slender fish with large eyes, and a pointed snout containing fang-like teeth. This gives them some superficial resemblance to barracudas (family Sphyraenidae), although the two groups are not closely related. Barracudinas are actually related to lizardfish (order Aulopiformes; suborder Alepisauroidei) and are most closely aligned with lancetfish (family Alepisauridae), hammerjaws (family Omosudidae) and daggertooths (family Anotopteridae). Like their close relatives, barracudinas lack swim bladders and are simultaneous hermaphrodites, a reproductive mode which is rare among vertebrates. The largest species of barracudina grow up to 100 cm (3.3 ft) in length.

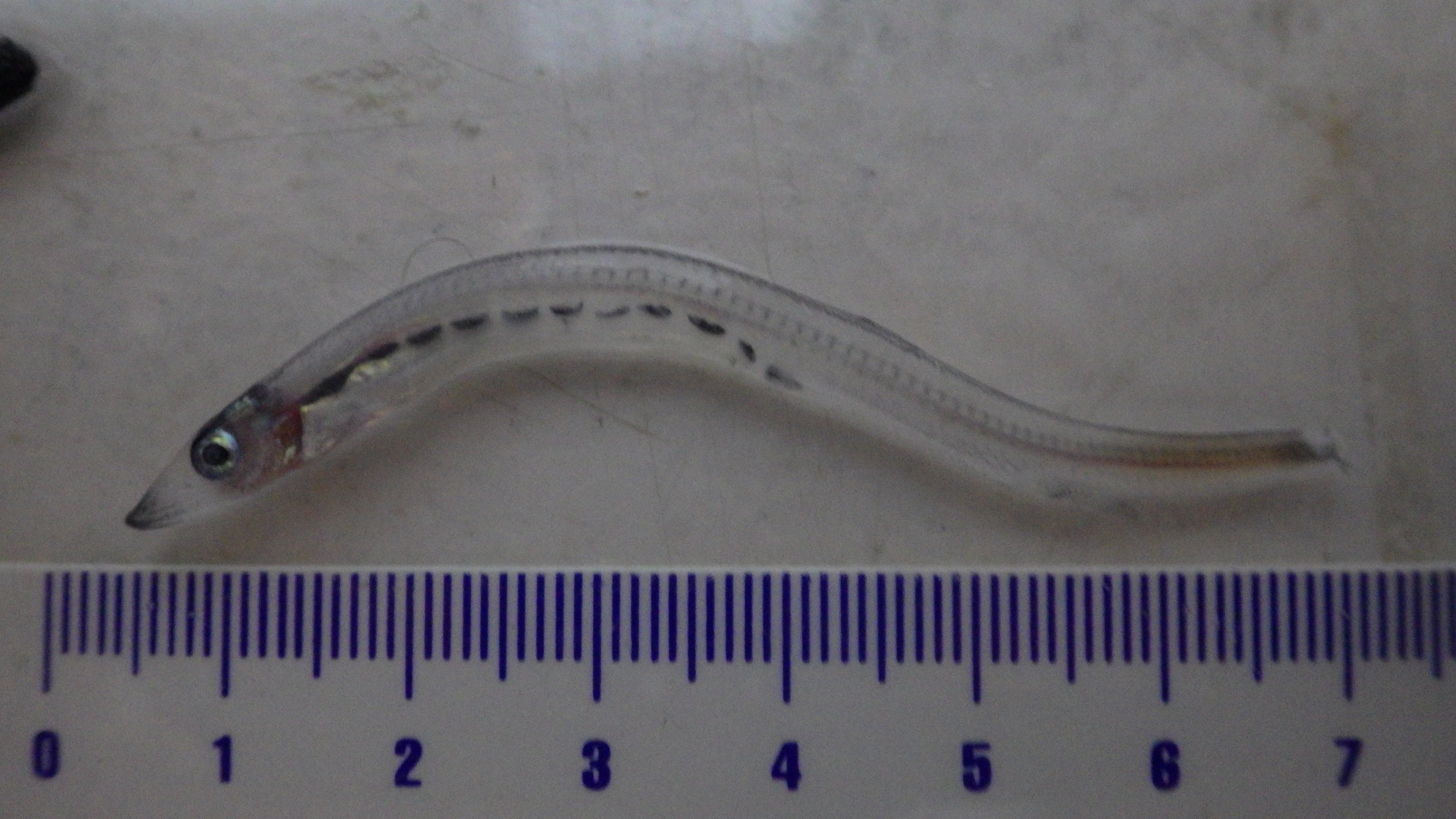
A juvenile barracudina, Lestidiops affinis, collected from the Gulf of Mexico

Barracudinas have some unique adaptations to life in the deep pelagic that are thought to help with camouflage: most barracudina species have a subdermal layer of guanine that imparts a kaleidoscopic color to their appearance in life and it is thought this refracts the dim light of mesophotic waters around their bodies. The smaller, more derived species of barracudinas in the genera Lestidiops, Lestidium, Lestrolepis and Stemonosudis possess very few scales and their skin is almost completely transparent, making it difficult for them to be seen underwater. Barracudinas, like many other deep-sea fishes, have darkly pigmented gut linings which are thought to help conceal bioluminescent prey such as lanternfish (family Myctophidae). Species in the genus Lestrolepis have a bioluminescent organ located ventrally along their stomachs which likely helps in countershading against downwelling light, camouflaging their silhouettes to would be predators below. Other species have a bioluminescent organ which evolved from liver tissue.

== Ecology and life history ==
Barracudinas are known to inhabit mesopelagic depths throughout the world's oceans, and are predators of fish, shrimps, and squids. While many barracudina species can be found at depths of 2000 m, their highest abundances tend to occur between 200 and 1000 m. Barracudinas are not thought to participate in diel vertical migration. While they are rarely caught by fisheries, they are frequently documented in the guts of pelagic predators such as tuna, swordfish, lancetfish, Cuvier's beaked whales, and blue sharks.

First-hand accounts from the Bathyscaphe Trieste reported behavioral observations of Lestrolepis intermedia rapidly swimming vertically through the water column like "silvery javelins" glowing "a brilliant yellow" from their bioluminescent organs. They were also observed hovering in the water and rapidly reorienting themselves from facing upwards to facing downwards as if scanning for predators and/or prey. If this behavior is common to all species of barracudina is not known, as it has not been observed since.

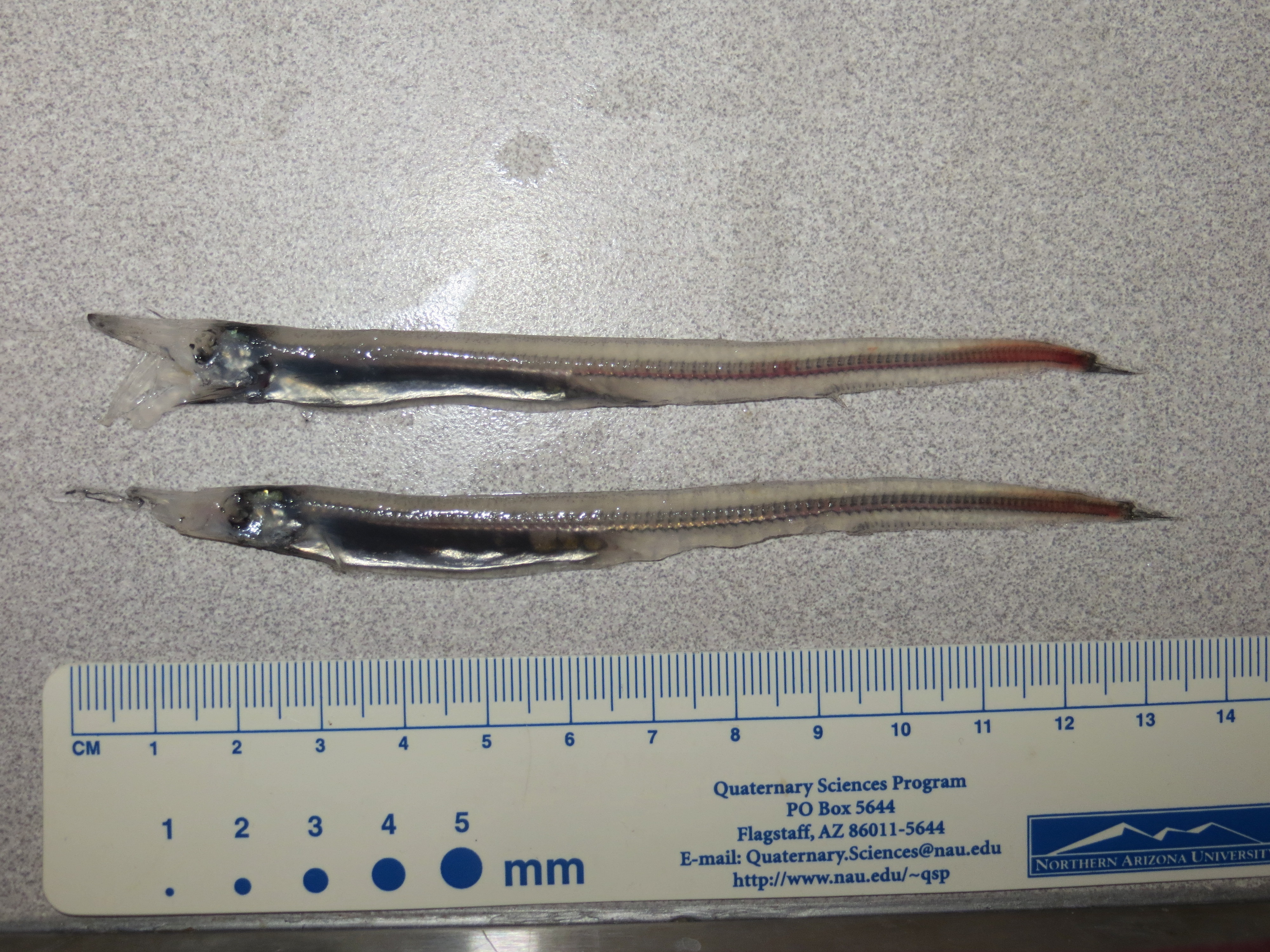
Lestrolepis intermedia. Their jaws were damaged by net capture

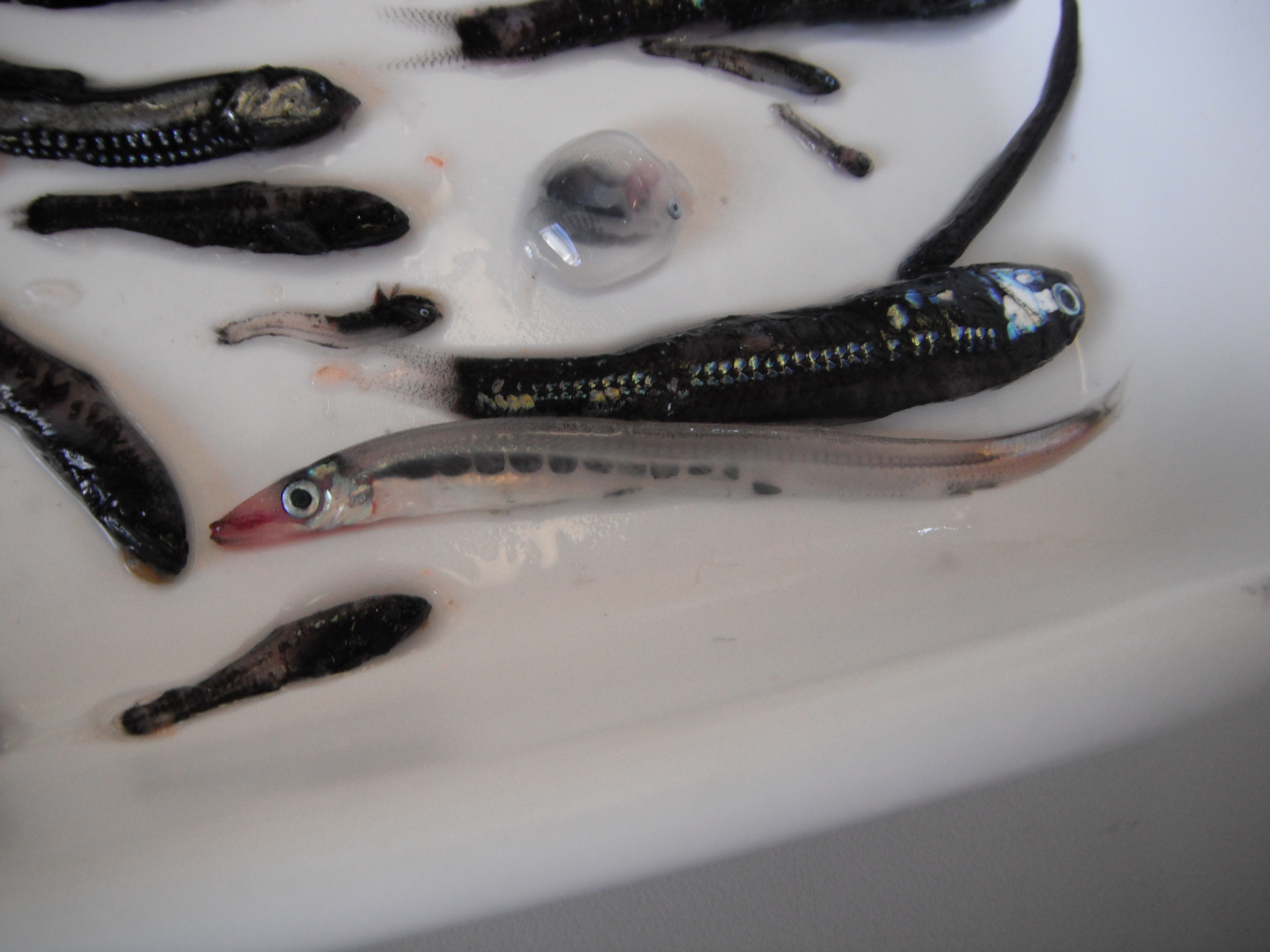
Lestidiops affinis depicted with other mespelagic fishes (such as lanterfish, bristlemouths, larval anglerfish, etc) caught by a multiple opening and closing net system

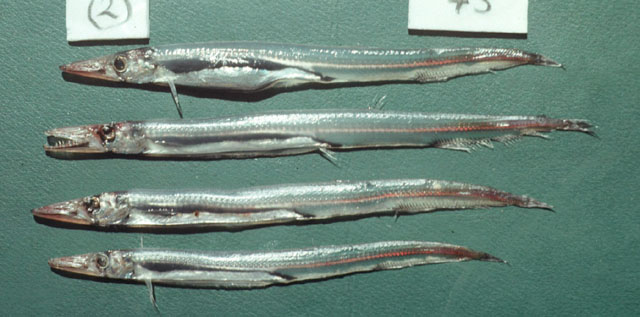
Lejap u5

Very little is known of the spawning habits of these fish. While both sperm and eggs are present in gonads, spawning has never been observed. Planktonic disposition and transmission of their early larva indicate that the eggs are fertilized and dispersed in the plankton. While specific life histories differ among species and genera, postlarval barracudina size classes are found more frequently within proximity to continental shelf escarpments at certain times of the year. However, this could also be a sampling artifact, since barracudina are only rarely caught by fisheries-independent sampling.
