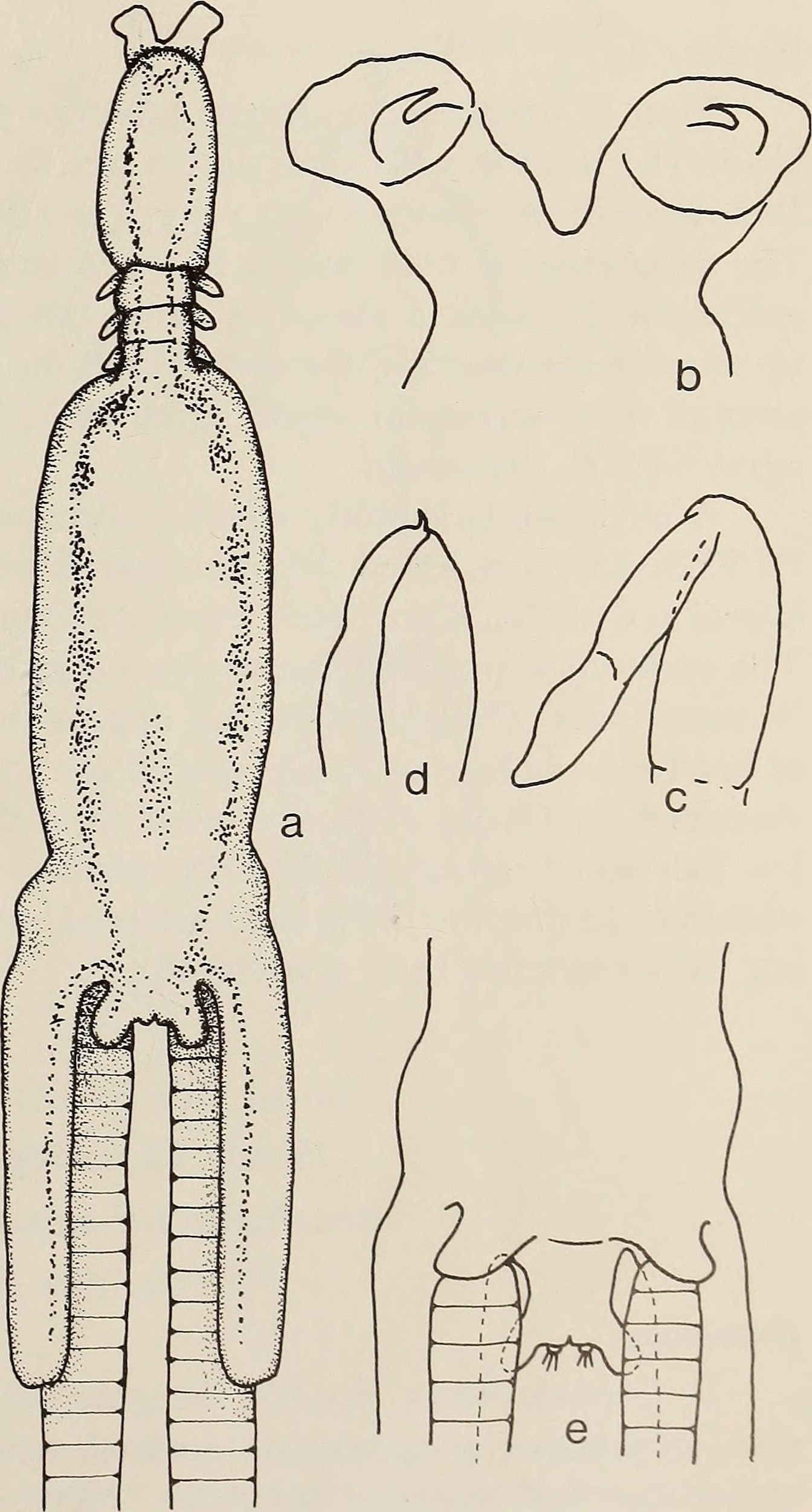

Scientific classification
- Kingdom: Animalia
- Phylum: Arthropoda
- Clade: Pancrustacea
- Class: Copepoda
- Order: Siphonostomatoida
- Family: Pennellidae
- Genus: Peniculisa; Wilson, 1917

= Peniculisa =

Genus of crustaceans

Peniculisa is a genus of marine parasitic copepods in the family Pennellidae.

== Biology ==
Organisms from this genus are often found attached to the bodies and fins of fishes in the South Pacific and Indian oceans. Individual fishes have been reported to harbor hundreds of Peniculisa wilsoni parasites. Infection intensity is rarely cited for other Peniculisa species. Peniculisa parasitic infections tend to be limited to tetraodontiform and pomacentrid fishes.

== Taxonomy ==
There are nine recognized species of Peniculisa:

- Peniculisa bellwoodi Boxshall, 1989 – parasite of Pomacentrus amboinensis
- Peniculisa bicaudata Shiino, 1956
- Peniculisa crassa Uyeno & Nagasawa, 2010 – parasite of Lactoria fornasini
- Peniculisa elongata Uyeno & Nagasawa, 2010 – parasite of Ostracion cubicus
- Peniculisa furcata Krøyer, 1863 – parasite of Paramonacanthus frenatus (Peters, 1855), reported as syn. Paramonacanthus barnardi
- Peniculisa ohirugi Uyeno & Nagasawa, 2010 – parasite of Pomacentrus nagasakiensis
- Peniculisa shiinoi Izawa, 1965 – parasite of Canthigaster rivulata
- Peniculisa uchinah Uyeno & Nagasawa, 2010 – parasite of Sufflamen fraenatum, Balistoides conspicillum, Rhinecanthus aculeatus, Sufflamen bursa, Sufflamen chrysopterum and Pervagor melanocephalus
- Peniculisa wilsoni Radhakrishnan, 1977 – parasite of Diodon hystrix, Arothron immaculatus, Arothron hispidus and Diodon holocanthus
