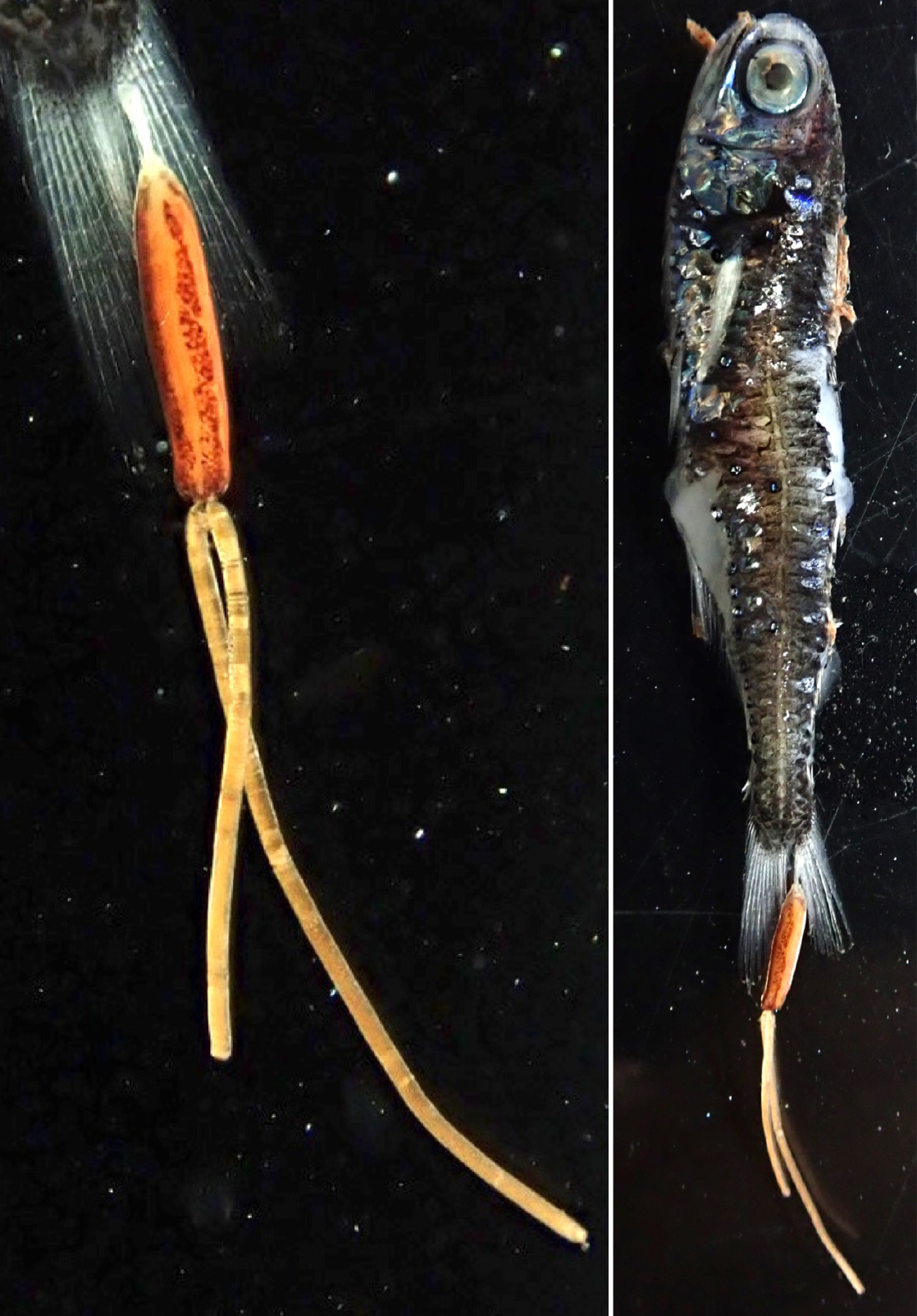
- Peniculus hokutoae attached to its host

Scientific classification
- Kingdom: Animalia
- Phylum: Arthropoda
- Clade: Pancrustacea
- Class: Copepoda
- Order: Siphonostomatoida
- Family: Pennellidae
- Genus: Peniculus
- Species: P. hokutoae

Binomial name
- Peniculus hokutoae Ohtsuka, Nishikawa & Boxshall, 2018

= Peniculus hokutoae =

Species of copepod

Peniculus hokutoae is a species of parasitic pennellid copepod. It was described in 2018 from a single female. The type-host is the myctophid fish Symbolophorus evermanni and the type-locality is off Japan. The Japanese name of this species is hokuto-kozutsu-hijikimushi.

According to Ohtsuka, Nishikawa & Boxshall, this species is the first record of parasitism by the genus Peniculus on a mesopelagic myctophid fish.

== Description ==
The species was distinguished from other congeners by (1) the presence of a conical process anterior to the rostrum; (2) the secondary elongation of the first pedigerous somite; (3) the incorporation of the third and fourth pedigerous somites into the trunk; (4) the unilobate maxillule bearing two unequal apical setae; (5) the lack of any processes on the first segment of the maxilla.

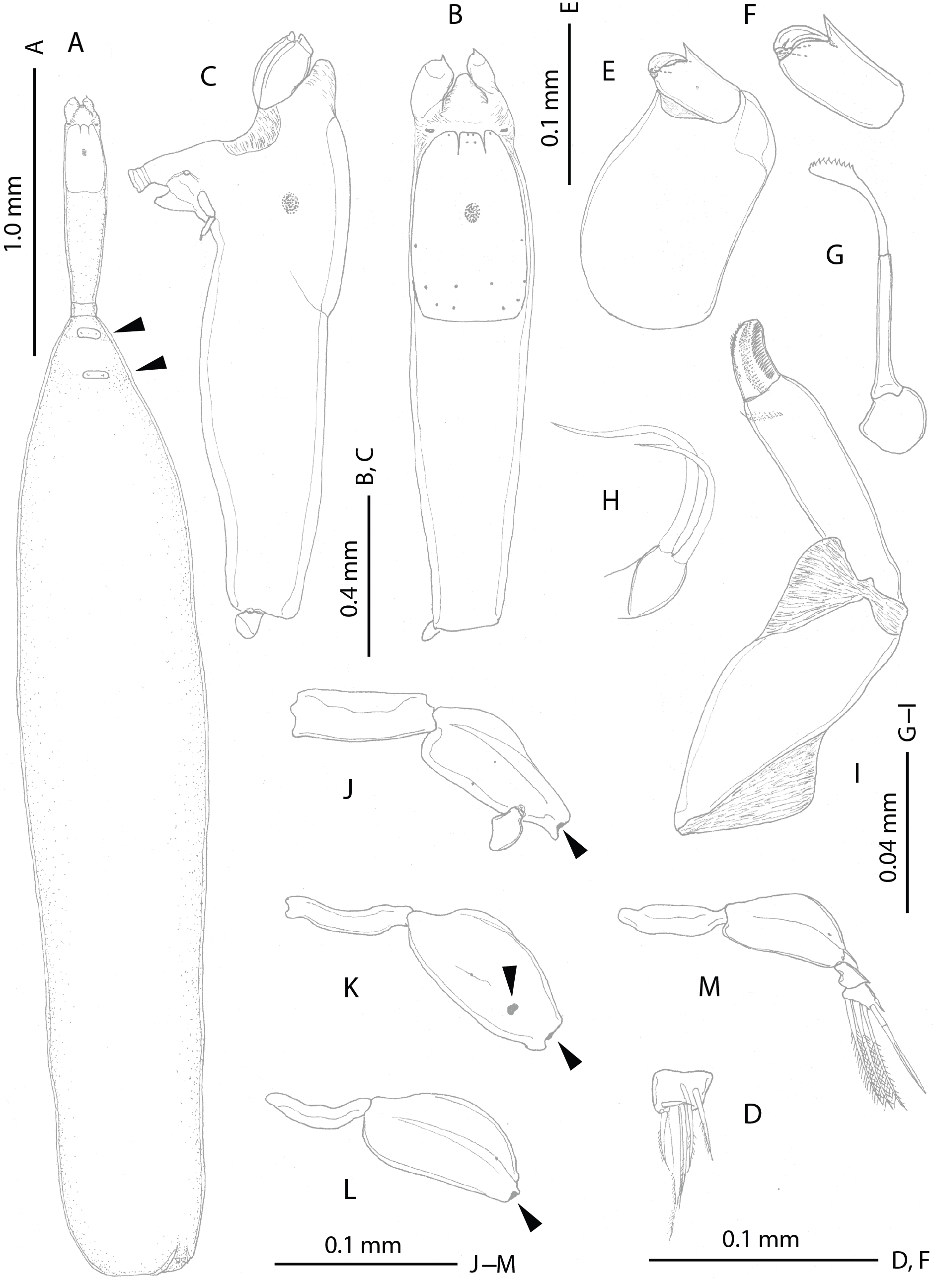
Line drawings of Peniculus hokutoae
