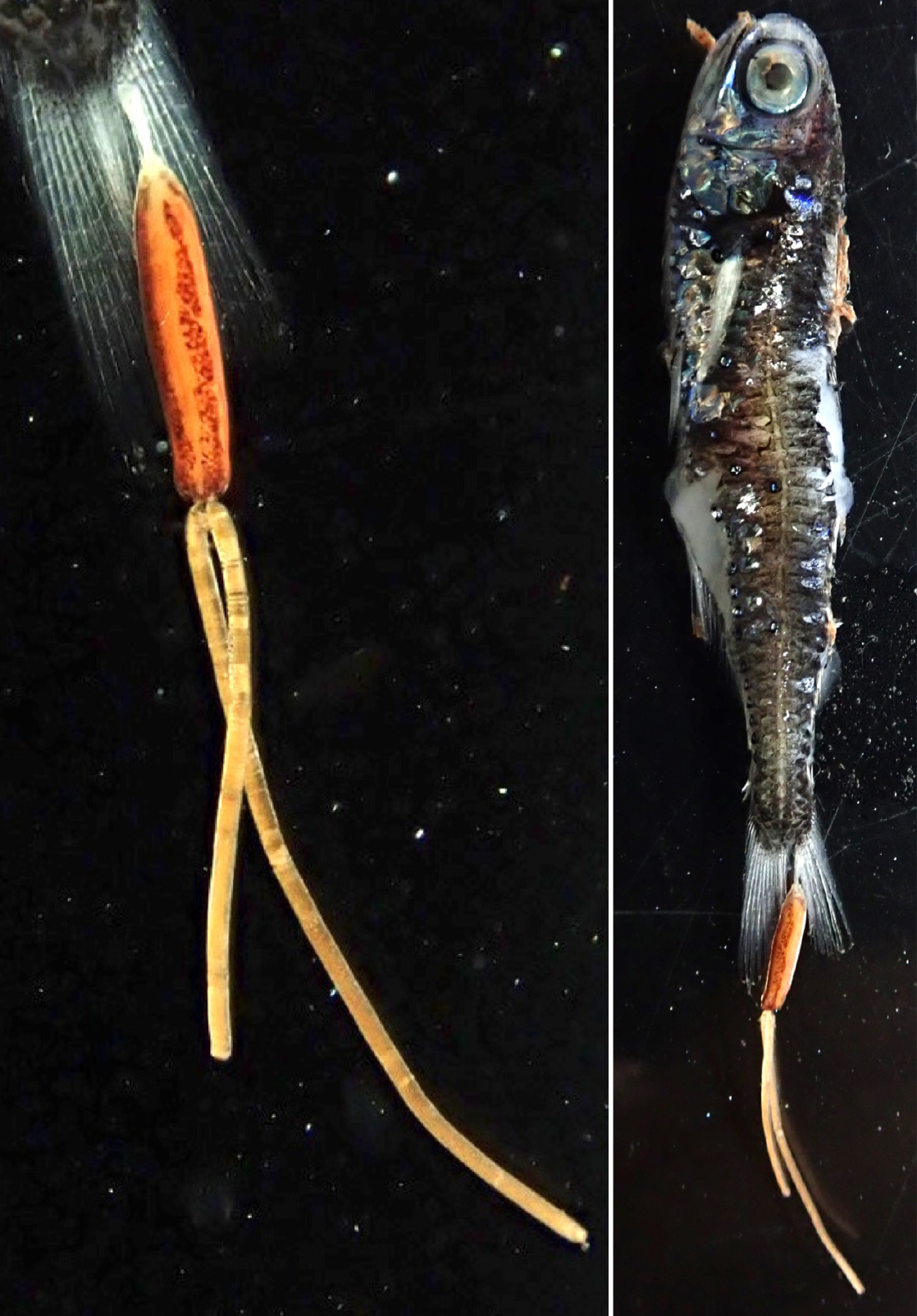
- Peniculus hokutoae attached to its host

Scientific classification
- Kingdom: Animalia
- Phylum: Arthropoda
- Clade: Pancrustacea
- Class: Copepoda
- Order: Siphonostomatoida
- Family: Pennellidae
- Genus: Peniculus von Nordmann, 1832

= Peniculus (crustacean) =

Genus of copepods

Peniculus is a genus of marine copepods in the family Pennellidae. They occur worldwide and typically parasitize coastal or epipelagic fish, with the exception of Peniculus hokutoae that was found parasitizing a mesopelagic myctophid, Symbolophorus evermanni.

== Species ==
There are 11 recognized species:

- Peniculus calamus Nordmann, 1864
- Peniculus clavatus Kröyer, 1863
- Peniculus communis Leigh-Sharpe, 1934
- Peniculus elegans Leigh-Sharpe, 1934
- Peniculus elongatus Boxshall, 1986
- Peniculus fistula Nordmann, 1832
- Peniculus hokutoae Ohtsuka, Nishikawa & Boxshall, 2018
- Peniculus minuticaudae Shiino, 1956
- Peniculus ostraciontis Yamaguti, 1939
- Peniculus quadratus Moon & Choi, 2014
- Peniculus truncatus Shiino, 1956
