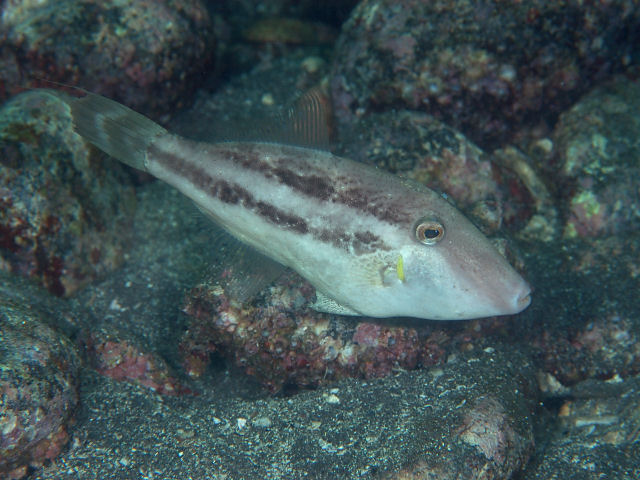

Scientific classification
- Kingdom: Animalia
- Phylum: Chordata
- Class: Actinopterygii
- Order: Tetraodontiformes
- Family: Monacanthidae
- Genus: Paramonacanthus
- Species: P. japonicus

Binomial name
- Paramonacanthus japonicus (Tilesius, 1809)

= Paramonacanthus japonicus =

Species of fish

Paramonacanthus japonicus is a filefish from the Indo-West Pacific. It occasionally makes its way into the aquarium trade. It grows to a size of 12 cm in length.

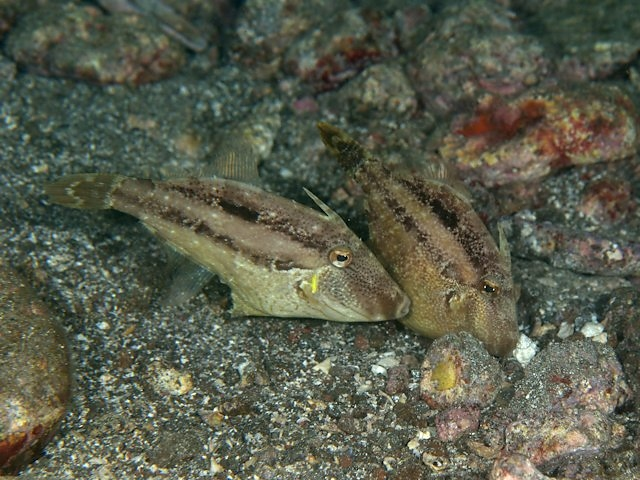
Spawning pair

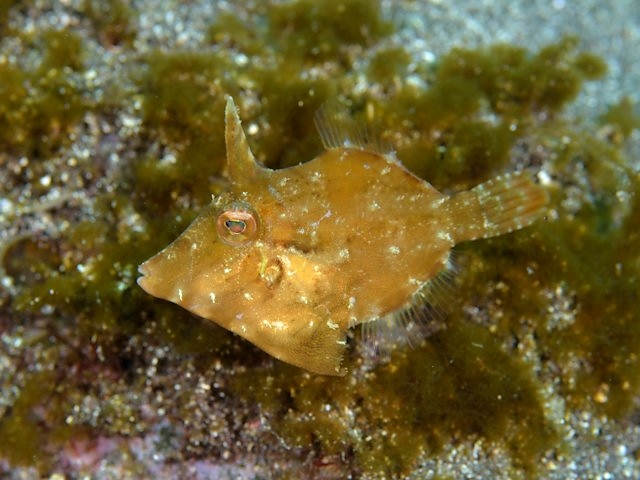
Juvenile
