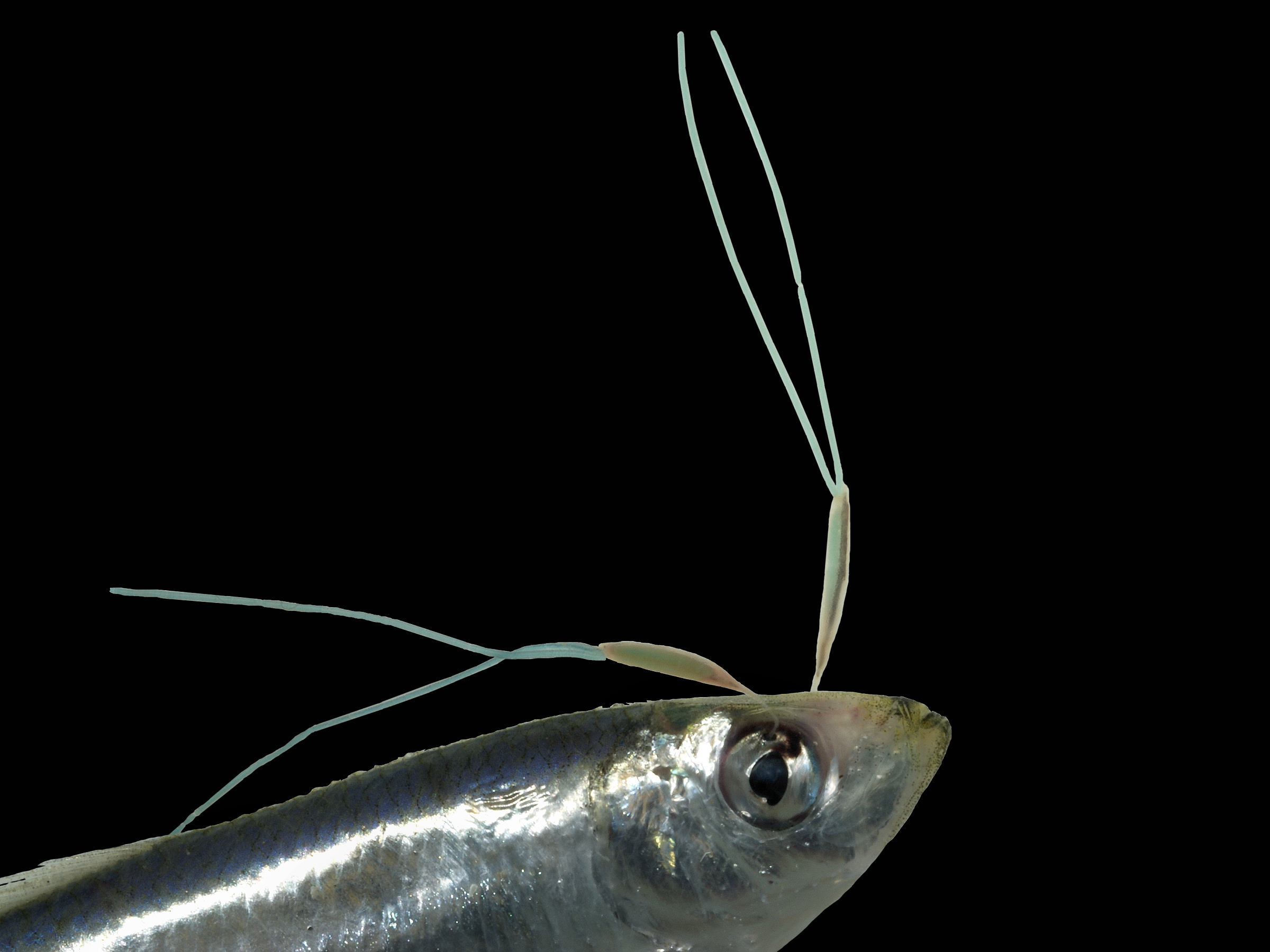
- Lernaeenicus sprattae on host Sprattus sprattus

Scientific classification
- Kingdom: Animalia
- Phylum: Arthropoda
- Clade: Pancrustacea
- Class: Copepoda
- Order: Siphonostomatoida
- Family: Pennellidae; Burmeister, 1835

Synonyms
- Pennillidae Burmeister, 1816

= Pennellidae =

Family of crustaceans

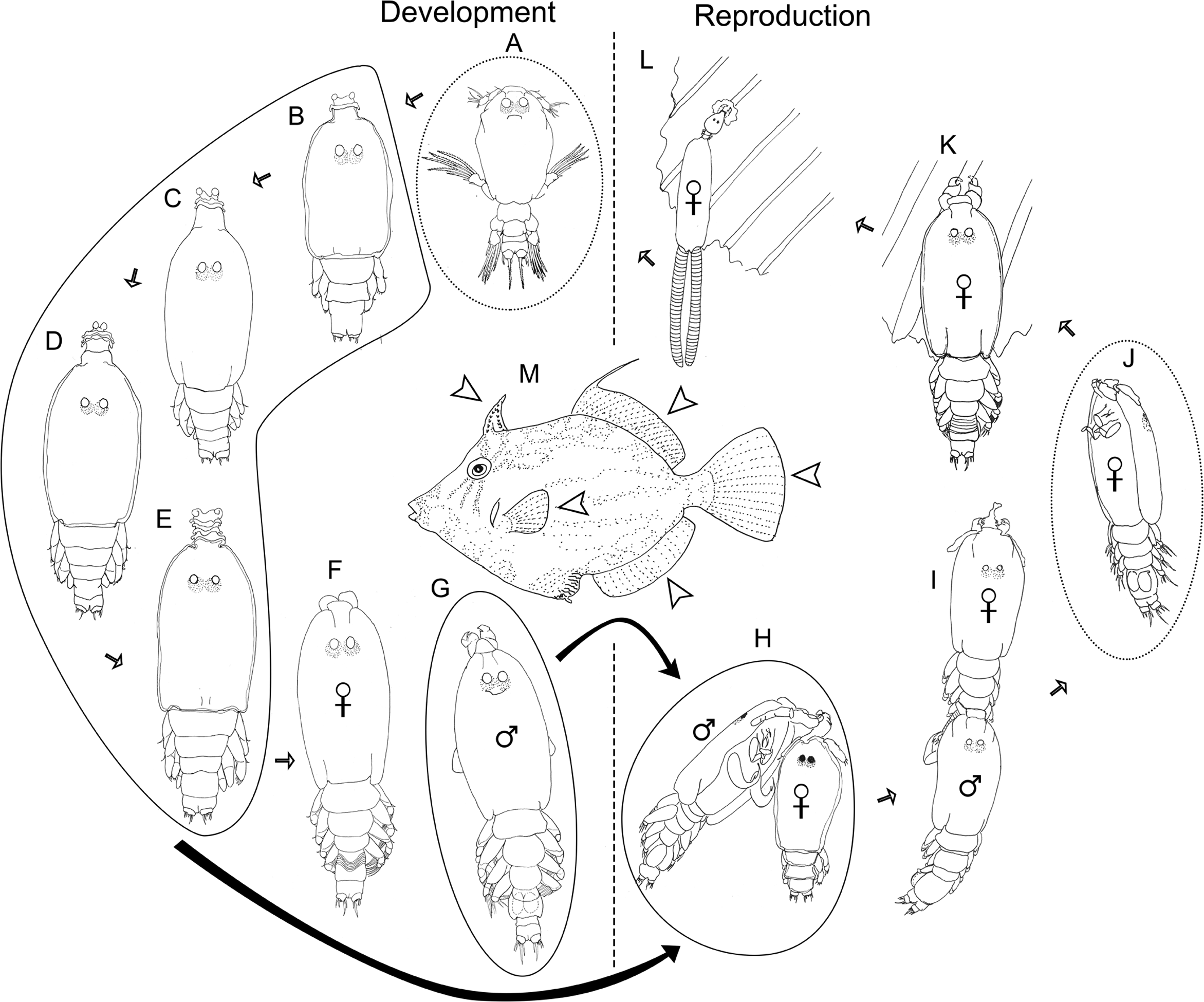
Complete life cycle of a pennellid, Peniculus minuticaudae Shiino, 1956 (Copepoda: Siphonostomatoida), infecting cultured threadsail filefish, Stephanolepis cirrhifer

Pennellidae is a family of parasitic copepods. When anchored on a host, they have a portion of the body on the outside of the host, whereas the remaining anterior part of the parasite is hidden inside tissues of the host.

== Genera ==
There are 24 genera:

- Allotrifur Yamaguti, 1963
- Cardiodectes C. B. Wilson, 1917
- Creopelates Shiino, 1958
- Exopenna Boxshall, 1986
- Haemobaphes Steenstrup & Lutken, 1861
- Impexus Kabata, 1972
- Lernaeenicus C. B. Wilson, 1932
- Lernaeocera Blainville, 1822
- Lernaeolophus Heller, 1865
- Metapeniculus Castro-Romero & Baeza-Kurok, 1985
- Nagasawanus Uyeno, 2015
- Ophiolernaea Shiino, 1958
- Parinia Kazachenko & Avdeev, 1977
- Peniculisa C. B. Wilson, 1917
- Peniculus von Nordmann, 1832
- Pennella Oken, 1816
- Peroderma Heller, 1865
- Phrixocephalus C. B. Wilson, 1908
- Propeniculus Castro Romero, 2014
- Protosarcotretes Ohtsuka, Lindsay & Izawa, 2018
- Pseudopeniculus Castro Romero, 2014
- Sarcotretes Jungersen, 1911
- Serpentisaccus Blasiola, 1979
- Trifur C. B. Wilson, 1917
