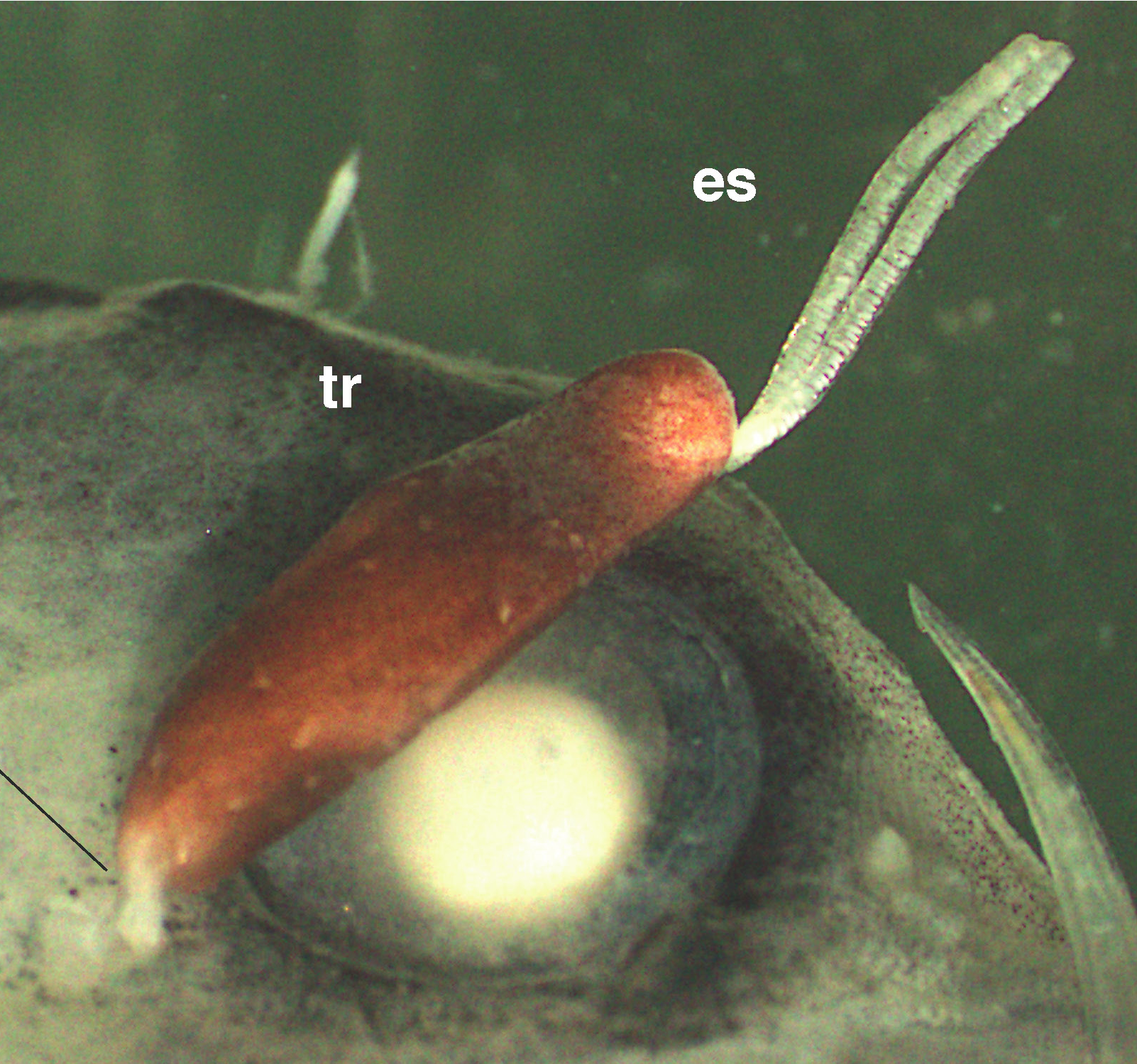
- Protosarcotretes nishikawai

Scientific classification
- Kingdom: Animalia
- Phylum: Arthropoda
- Clade: Pancrustacea
- Class: Copepoda
- Order: Siphonostomatoida
- Family: Pennellidae
- Genus: Protosarcotretes; Ohtsuka, Lindsay & Izawa, 2018

= Protosarcotretes =

Genus of crustaceans

Protosarcotretes is a genus of marine copepods in the family Pennellidae. Its type-species is Protosarcotretes nishikawai. This genus exhibits the most plesiomorphic states in the first to fourth legs of pennellids, and is differentiated from two closely related pennellid genera Sarcotretes and Lernaeenicus by the morphology of the oral appendages.

== Species ==
According to Ohtsuka, Lindsay & Izawa (2018), three species are included in the genus:

- Protosarcotretes nishikawai Ohtsuka, Lindsay & Izawa, 2018 This species is a parasite of the Pacific viperfish, Chauliodus macouni.
- Protosarcotretes multilobatus (Lewis, 1959) Ohtsuka, Lindsay & Izawa, 2018
- Protosarcotretes gnavus (Leigh-Sharpe, 1934) Ohtsuka, Lindsay & Izawa, 2018
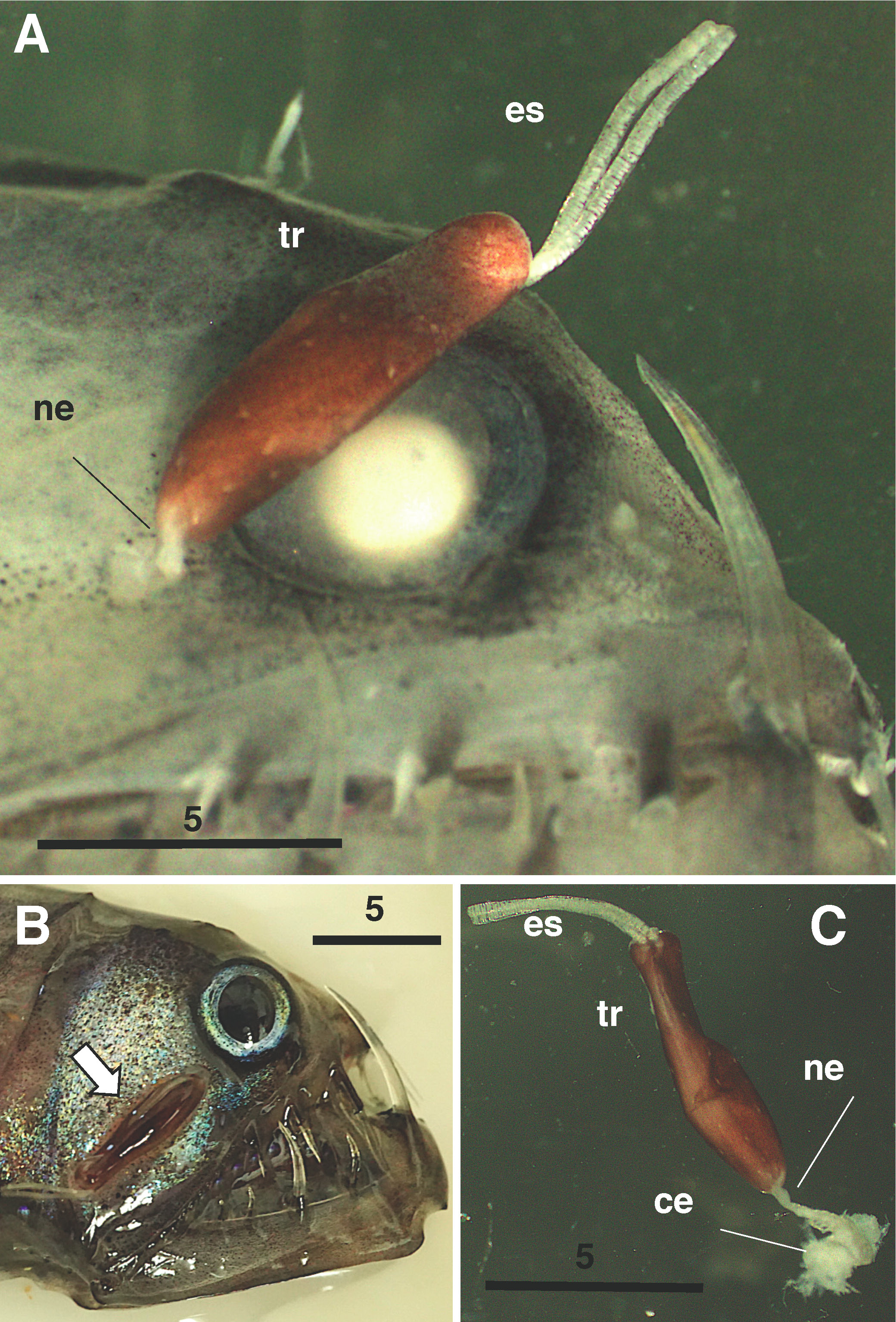
Protosarcotretes nishikawai

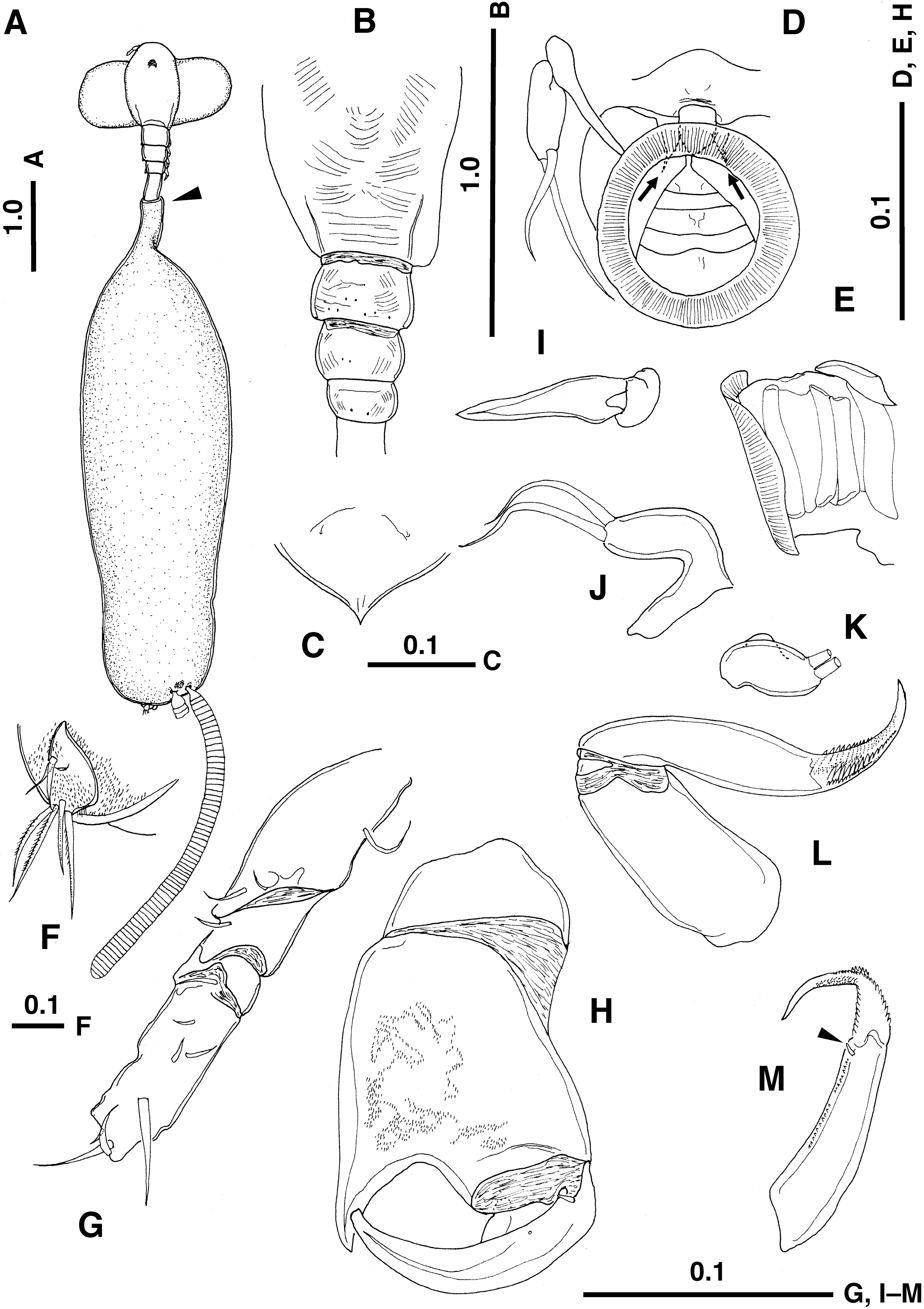
Protosarcotretes nishikawai

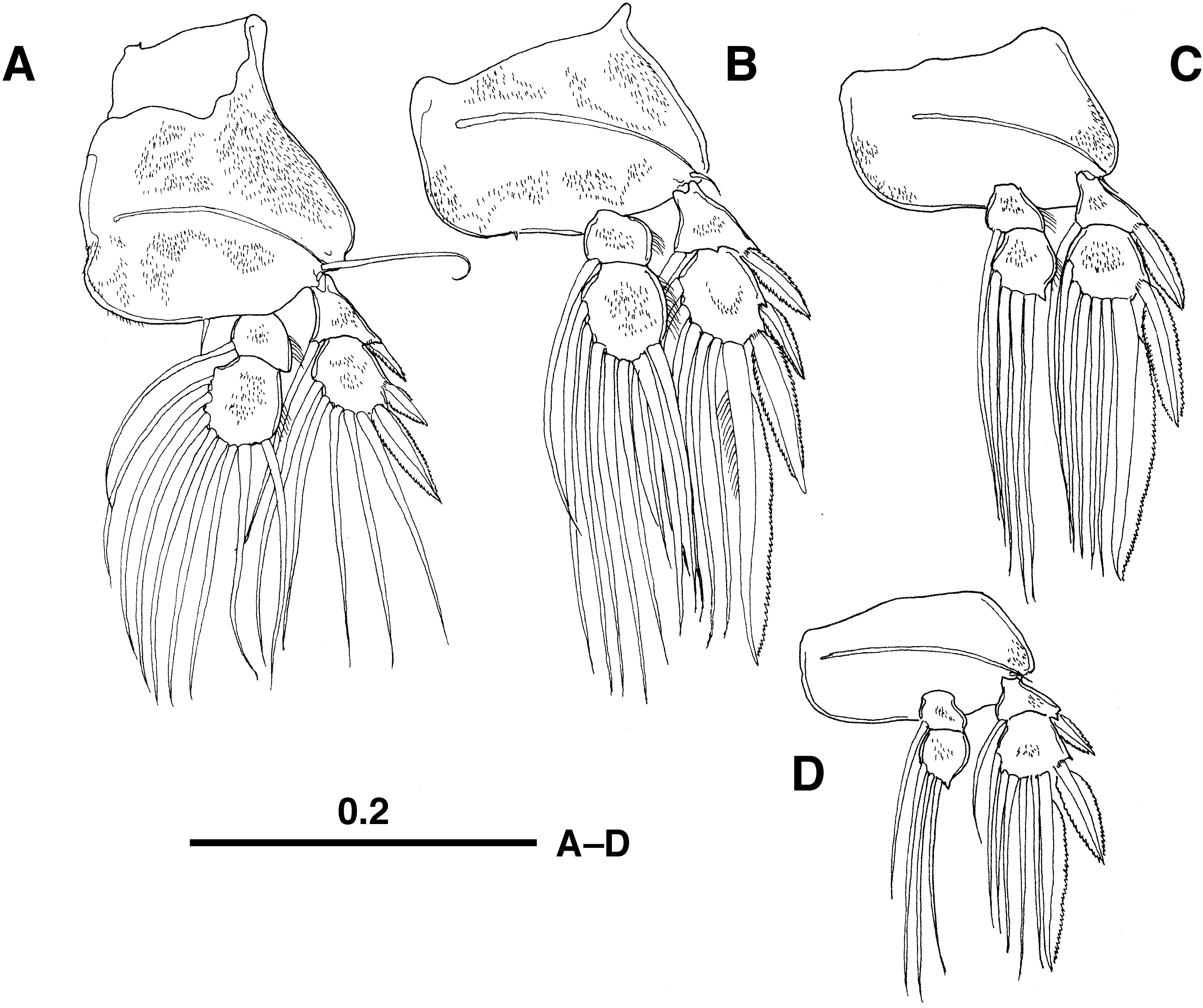
Protosarcotretes nishikawai
