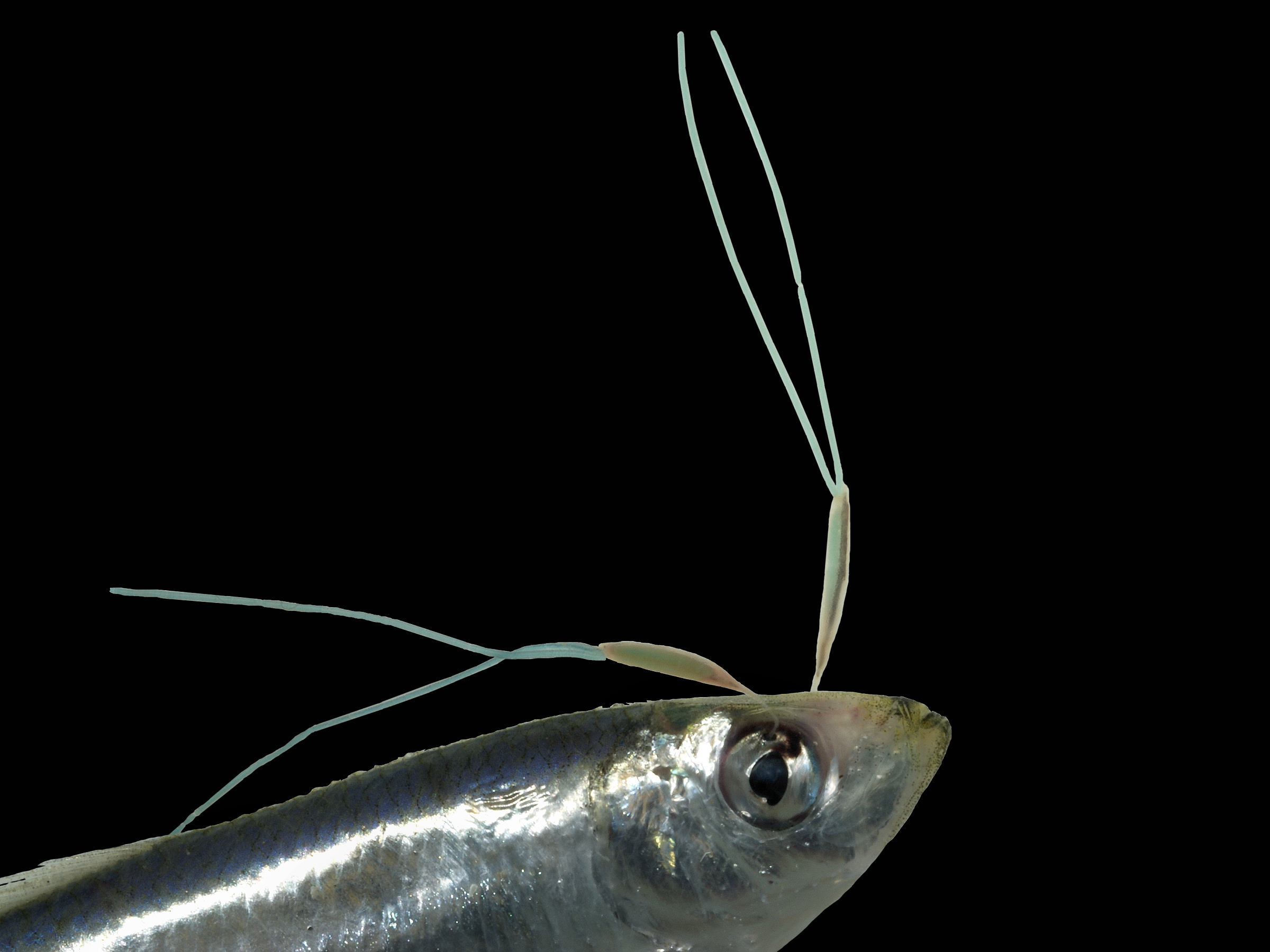
- Lernaeenicus sprattae on host European sprat

Scientific classification
- Kingdom: Animalia
- Phylum: Arthropoda
- Class: Copepoda
- Order: Siphonostomatoida
- Family: Pennellidae
- Genus: Lernaeenicus
- Species: L. sprattae

Binomial name
- Lernaeenicus sprattae (Sowerby, 1806)

Synonyms
- Lernaea spratta Sowerby, 1806; Foroculum spratti Thompson W., 1844; Lernaea cyclophora Blainville, 1822; Lernaea ocularis Cuvier, 1830; Lernaea surrirensis (Blainville, 1823); Lernaeenicus bairdii (Salter, 1850); Lernaeenicus monillaris (Milne Edwards, 1840); Lernaeenicus sardinae Baudouin, 1904; Lernaeenicus spratta; Lernaeocera surriraiis Blainville, 1822; Lernaeonema bairdii Salter, 1850; Lernaeonema monillaris Milne Edwards, 1840; Lernaeonema spratta (Sowerby, 1806)

= Lernaeenicus sprattae =

Species of crustacean

Lernaeenicus sprattae is a species of copepod in the family Pennellidae. It is a parasite of the European sprat (Sprattus sprattus) and certain other fish and is sometimes known as the sprat eye-maggot.

== Distribution ==
Lernaeenicus sprattae is a parasite of the European sprat (Sprattus sprattus) in northwestern Europe and the European pilchard (Sardina pilchardus) in southwestern Europe, the Mediterranean Sea, and the Black Sea.

== Ecology ==
This copepod has a large number of developmental-stages, some free-living and some parasitic. Two naupliar stages and the first copepodid stage are free-living and are followed by a second copepodid stage where the larva grasps a host fish. This is followed by four chalimus stages (nymphal stages) where the larvae are parasitic on the host. During the next stage, the adults are free-living and mate, the male dying soon after copulation. The female moults once more before reattaching to a sprat, either on its external surface or by invading the eye; while in the eye, the female transforms into a mature adult with two attached strings of eggs. The earliest naupliar stages take place before the eggs hatch and are released from the strings. Altogether, there are fourteen developmental stages. The life cycle is very similar to that of Lernaeocera branchialis, a parasite of the European flounder (Pleuronectes flesus), the common sole (Solea solea), and the lumpsucker (Cyclopterus lumpusbut), but the cycle is slower, with each of the developmental stages taking longer.

== Pathology ==
The copepod commonly burrows into the eye of the host, causing damage to the retina and cornea. The fish's vision is reduced and it may be blinded. Copepods can also attach to the flank of the fish by piercing it with its clawed limbs. The host's immune response causes inflammation of the surrounding tissue and further secures the parasite's hold. The parasite feeds on the host's blood and lysed cells.

The loss of nutrients from the copepod feeding on blood and lysed cells is not enough to kill the fish; instead the host usually dies as a result of the copepod's physical attachment. Infected fish were observed to be slower than uninfected fish, likely due to reduced vision and blindness, which make it harder for the infected fish to escape predation. Disruption in blood flow from parasite feeding and physical difficulty moving due to the location of parasite attachment on the body also contribute to a loss of agility in infected fish.
