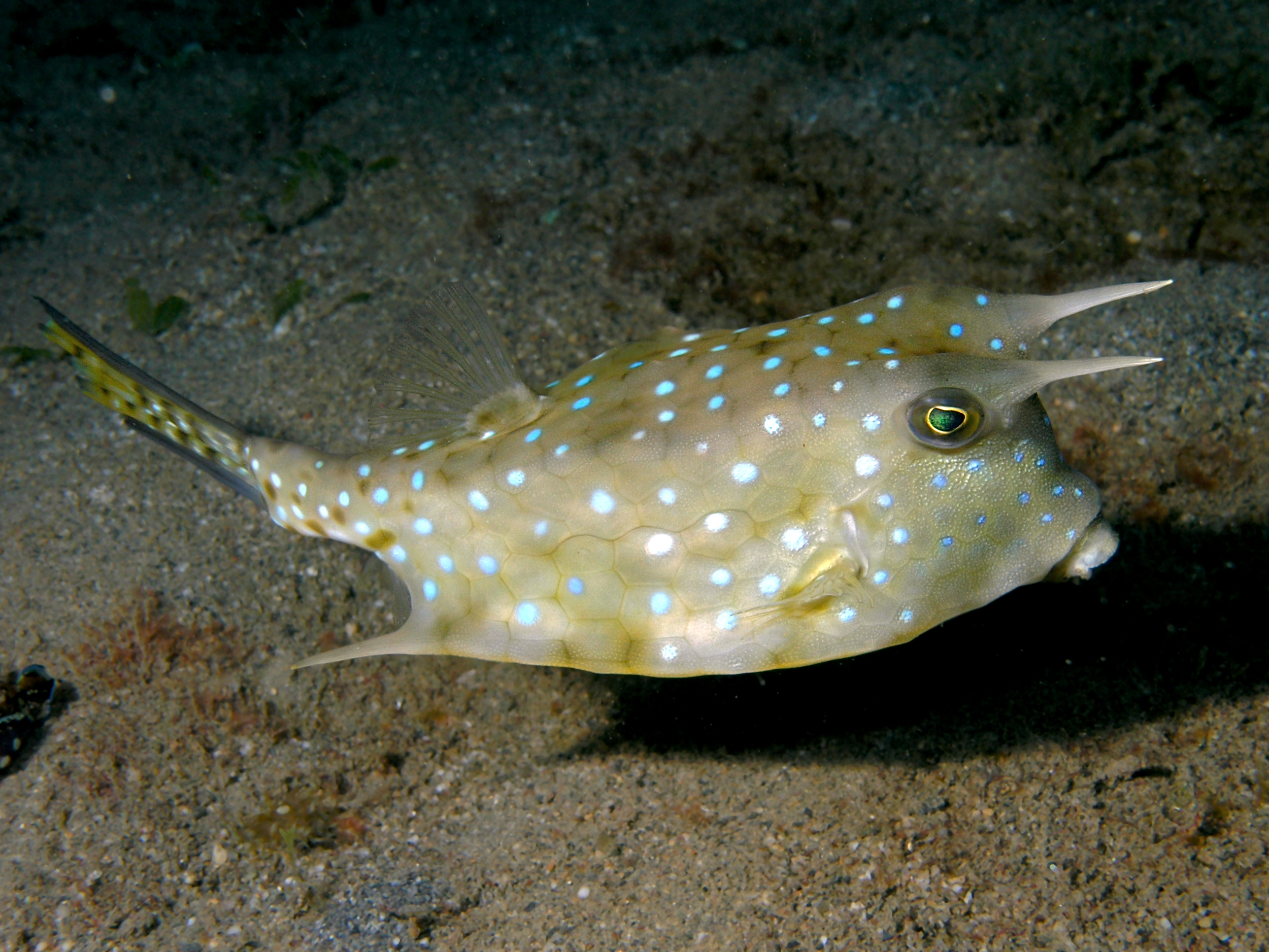
- Lactoria cornuta

Scientific classification
- Kingdom: Animalia
- Phylum: Chordata
- Class: Actinopterygii
- Order: Tetraodontiformes
- Family: Ostraciidae
- Genus: Lactoria; D. S. Jordan & Fowler, 1902

Type species
- Ostracion cornutus Linnaeus, 1758

Synonyms
- Tetragonizus Billberg, 1833

= Lactoria =

Genus of fishes

Lactoria is a genus of marine ray-finned fishes belonging to the family Ostraciidae, the boxfishes. The fishes in this genus are found in the Indo-Pacific, with one species extending into the southeastern Atlantic.

== Taxonomy ==
Lactoria was first proposed as a subgenus of Ostracion in 1902 by the American ichthyologists David Starr Jordan and Henry Weed Fowler with Ostracion cornutus designated as its type species. O. conrunutus was described in the 10th edition of Systema Naturae published in 1978 with its type locality given as "India". The 5th edition of Fishes of the World classifies this genus within the family Ostraciidae in the suborder Ostracioidea within the order Tetraodontiformes.

=== Etymology ===
Lactoria means "milkcow", a reference to the large spines above the eyes resembling the horns of a cow. The fishes in this genus are known as cowfishes, as are some related species.

== Description ==
Lactoria cowfishes have thick, rectangular bodies that are largely enclosed in a carapace which is made up of thickened, hexagonal plate -like scales which are jointed to each other. There are five horizontal ridges on the carapace, a poorly developed one along the back and a pair, upper and lower, on each flank. There is a large spine above each eye and a spine at the rear end of each of the lower flank ridges and there is sometimes a spine halfway along the ridge along the back. They have small mouths located at the front of the snout, with fleshy lips and a row of no more than 15 moderately sized conical teeth in each jaw. The gill slits are short and oblique and are to the front of the bases of the pectoral fins. The dorsal and anal fins are at the back of the carapace and the caudal peduncle is thin and flexible. The caudal fin is fan shaped. The longhorn cowfish is the largest species in the genus with a maximum published total length of 46 cm (18 in) while the smallest is the thornback cowfish maximum published total length of 23 cm (9.1 in).

== Distribution ==
Lactoria cowfishes are found in the southeastern Atlantic Ocean, off southwestern Africa, east through the Indian Ocean and into the Pacific as far east as the eastern Pacific Ocean off the western South American coast.

== Species ==
Three species in this genus are recognized:

Image	Scientific name	Common name	Distribution
	Lactoria cornuta (Linnaeus, 1758)	longhorn cowfish	Indo-Pacific
	Lactoria diaphana (Bloch & J. G. Schneider, 1801)	roundbelly cowfish	Southeast Atlantic: off Swakopmund, Namibia. Indo-Pacific and Eastern Pacific: South Africa east through Indonesia to the Easter Island and Peru, north to southern Japan, Hawaii, and southern California, south to New Caledonia, New South Wales and Kermadec Islands
	Lactoria fornasini (Bianconi, 1846)	thornback cowfish	tropical Indo-Pacific from East Africa to the Bass Islands (French Polynesia).

FishBase lists a fourth species, L. paschae, but Catalog of Fishes treats this name as a synonym of L. diaphana.
