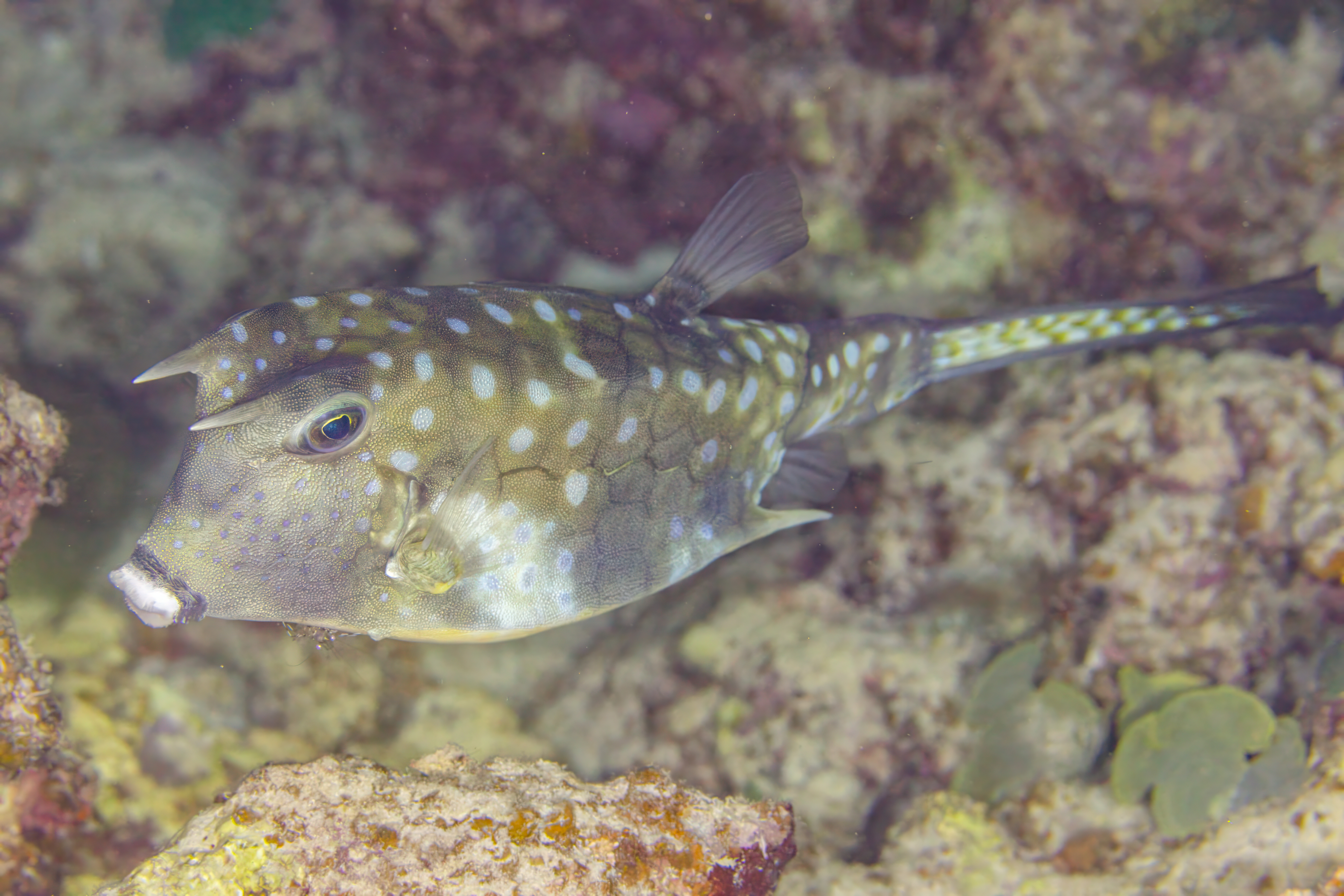
- In Mauritius

Conservation status
- Least Concern (IUCN 3.1)

Scientific classification
- Kingdom: Animalia
- Phylum: Chordata
- Class: Actinopterygii
- Division: Teleostei
- Order: Tetraodontiformes
- Family: Ostraciidae
- Genus: Lactoria
- Species: L. cornuta

Binomial name
- Lactoria cornuta (Linnaeus, 1758)

Synonyms
- Ostracion cornutus Linnaeus, 1758

= Longhorn cowfish =

Species of fish

The longhorn cowfish (Lactoria cornuta), also called the horned boxfish, is a species of marine ray-finned fish belonging to the family Ostraciidae, the boxfish. This species is recognizable by its long horns that protrude from the front of its head, rather like those of a cow or bull. They are a resident of the Indo-Pacific region and can grow up to 50 cm (20 in) long.

Adults are reef fish, often solitary and territorial, and live around sand or rubble bottom up to a depth of 50 m (160 ft). They are omnivorous, feeding upon benthic algae, various microorganisms, and foraminiferans that it strains from sediments, sponges, polychaete worms and from sand flats. It also can eat mollusks, small crustaceans, and small fish - it's able to feed on benthic invertebrates by blowing jets of water into the sandy substrate. Longhorn cowfish protect the coral reefs they live in by being predators of the invertebrates that destroy the reefs. They are also important in the growth and creation of coral reefs for this same reason.

== Taxonomy ==
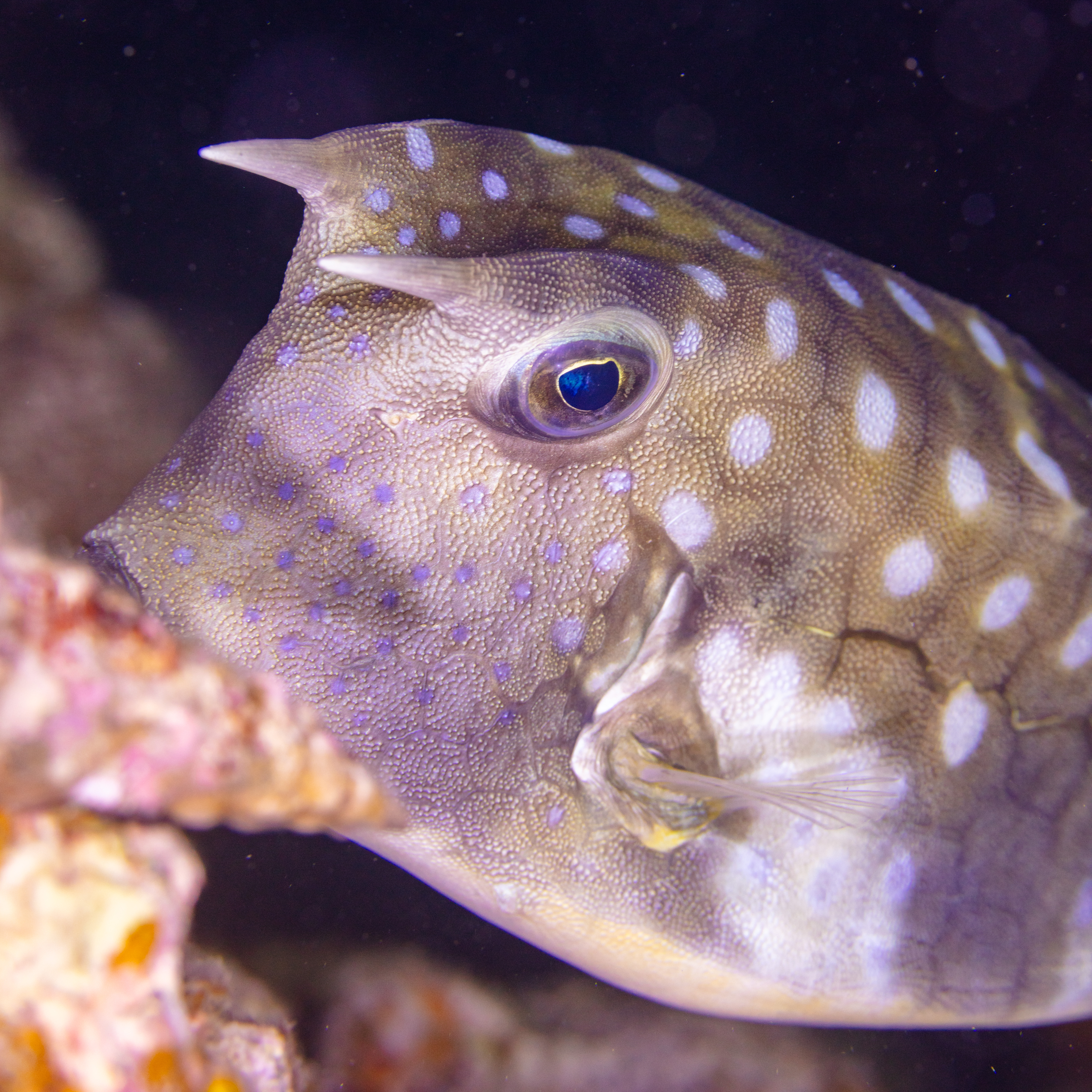
Detail view

The longhorn cowfish was first formally described as Ostracion cornutus in the 10th edition of Systema Naturae published in 1758 by Carl Linnaeus with its type locality given as India. In 1902 David Starr Jordan and Henry Weed Fowler proposed the subgenus Lactoria within Ostracion and designated O. cornutus as its type species. The 5th edition of Fishes of the World classifies this genus within the family Ostraciidae in the suborder Ostracioidea within the order Tetraodontiformes.

=== Etymology ===
The genus name Lactoria means "milkcow", a reference to the large spines above the eyes resembling the horns of a cow. The fishes in this genus are known as cowfishes, as are some related species. The specific name cornutus means "horned", alluding to the large spines in front of the eyes.

== Habitat ==
Its primary habitat is coral reefs in lagoons, on reef flats, estuaries, bays, and on protected seaward reefs. Juveniles associate with Acropora corals. Depth range is 1–45 m (3 ft 3 in – 147 ft 8 in), perhaps up to 100 m (330 ft).

== Distribution ==
Red Sea and East Africa eastward through Indonesia to Marquesas, northward to southern Japan. Including Tuamotus, southern Korea, north to the Ryukyu Islands of southern Japan, south to Australia and Lord Howe Island. Tropical and subtropical waters. The specimens found in India are a new development in the last couple years, and it is speculated that cyclones or typhoons brought Lactoria cornuta to a new environment.

== Description ==
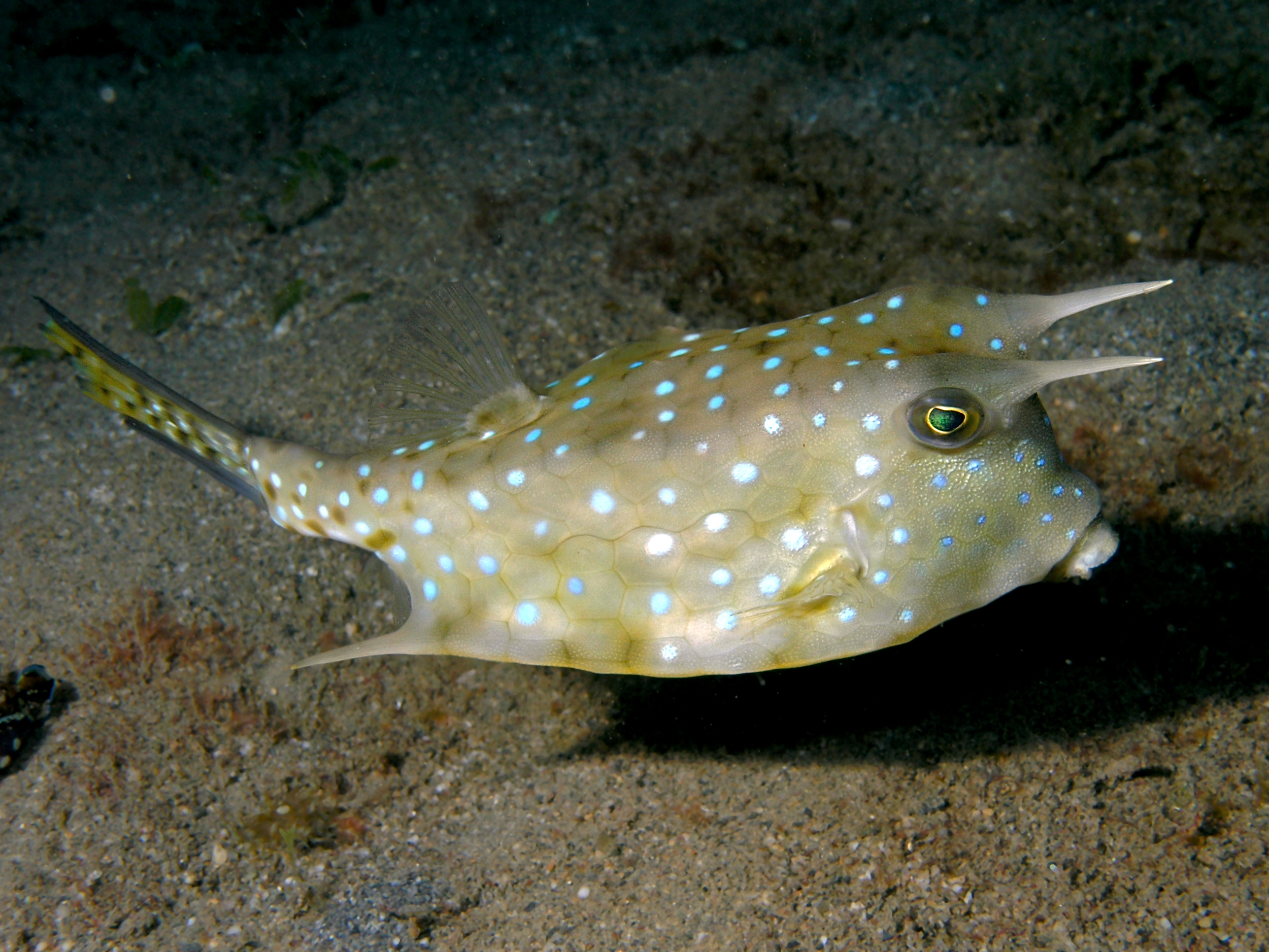
In Timor

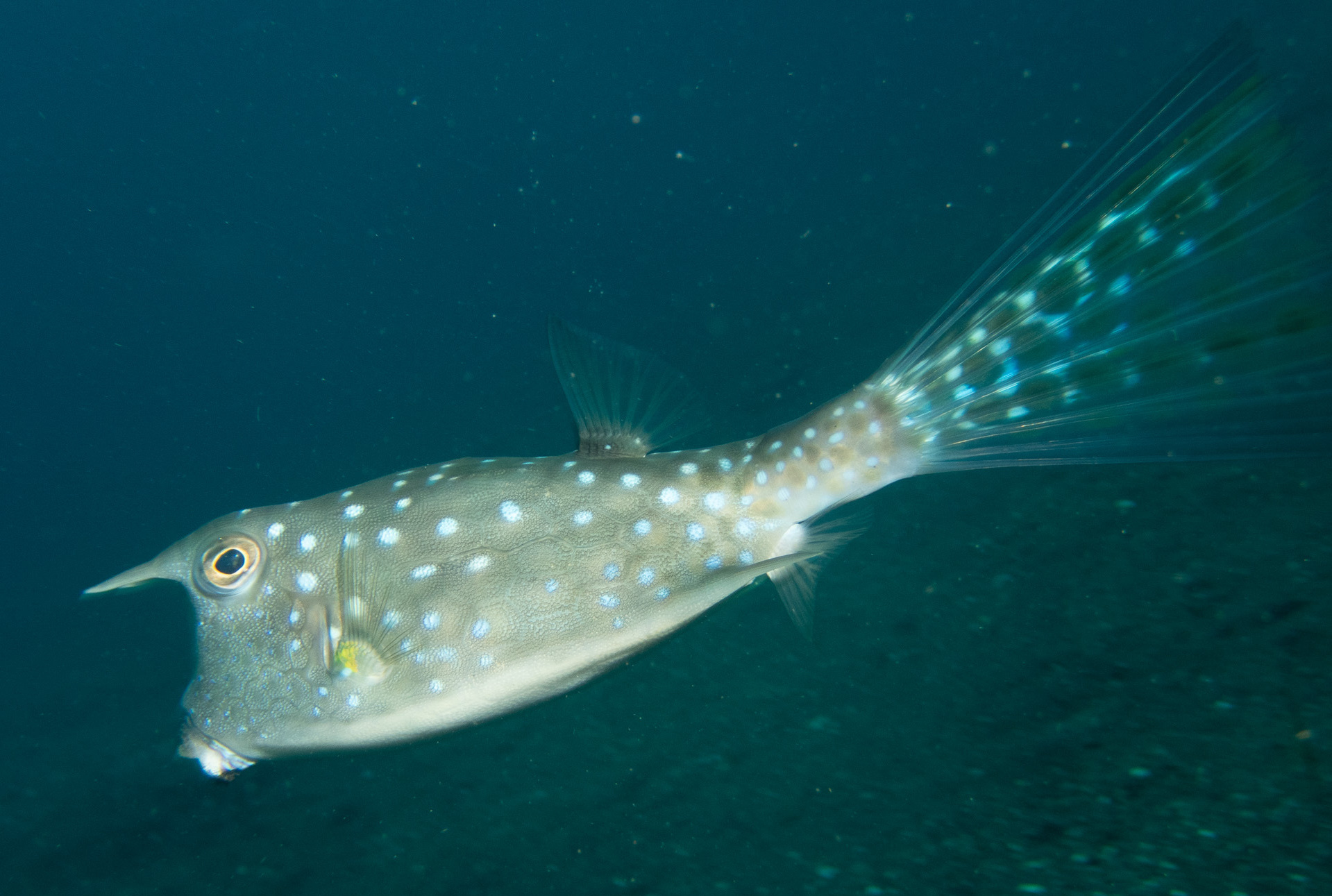
In Indonesia

There is no known sexual dimorphism, so both male and female display a yellow to olive base color, which is decorated with white or bluish spots. Pairs courts each other just before or after sunset. Eggs and ichthyoplankton are pelagic. Females generally are larger than males. Males grow to be 65–155 mm with an average of 103 mm, while females grow to be 83–250 mm with an average of 121 mm. Female longhorn cowfish also weigh more than males with a weight range of 17–156 g with an average of 33 g while males have a weight range of 12–116 g with an average of 26 g.

One distinction from other fish is the lack of a gill cover, which is replaced by a small slit or hole. The hexagonal plate-like scales of these fish are fused together into a solid, triangular, box-like carapace, from which the fins and tail protrude. They have large eyes immediately behind the horns. Their unique method of swimming, called ostraciiform swimming, causes them to look as if they are hovering. They have no pelvic skeleton, so they lack pelvic fins. The tail fin of the longhorn cowfish can be the same length as its body, as it relies on its fins for movement. They are slow swimmers and are easily caught by hand, making a grunting noise when captured. The cowfish are also able to produce two kinds of sounds using muscles connected to their swim bladder, hums and clicks. This species of cowfish is the most well-known cowfish species in the aquarium trade.

=== Defense ===
If severely stressed, this species may be able to exude deadly toxin, pahutoxin, an ichthyotoxic, hemolytic, heat-stable, non-dialyzable, non-protein poison in the mucous secretions of their skin. It is apparently unique among known fish poisons; it is toxic to the boxfish and mimics sea cucumber toxins in general properties.

The horns of the Longhorn cowfish may have evolved to make it more difficult to swallow for predators. The horns of the boxfish can be used to ward off predators through charging at the predator. If damaged, these horns can grow back within a few months. These horns are mostly hollow and composed of mineralized collagen fibers. Both the hard armor exoskeleton and the use of the toxic secretion are solid defenses against predators. There are also egg predators like wrasses and damselfishes. Larger species in the family are able to ward off the egg predators, but the Longhorn Cowfish spawn close to the substrate in order to hide themselves and their eggs from the predators.

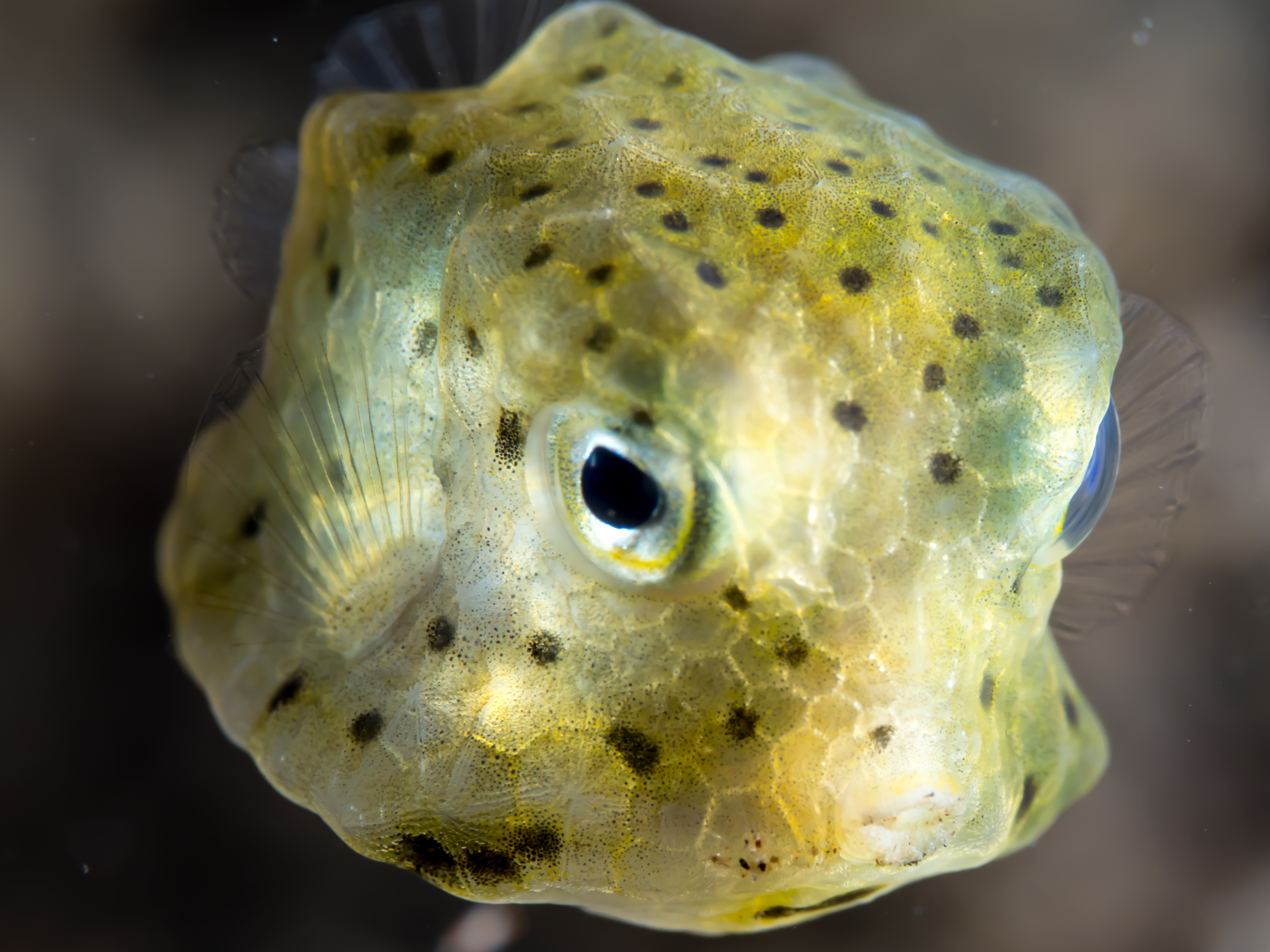
Young juvenile

=== Reproduction and development ===
This fish forms harems with 3–4 females in each one. The females spawn shortly after sunset, or during the day when there is a large amount of cloud cover. The spawning season lasts from February to early October. The oval eggs of species in the genus Lactoria hatch into the juvenile larvae. These larvae are distinct because they form the box carapace armor that is present on the longhorn cowfish.

On Pamban Island, the local belief was that when the land got separated, the cows on the island metamorphosed into these fish and fed on seaweed.
