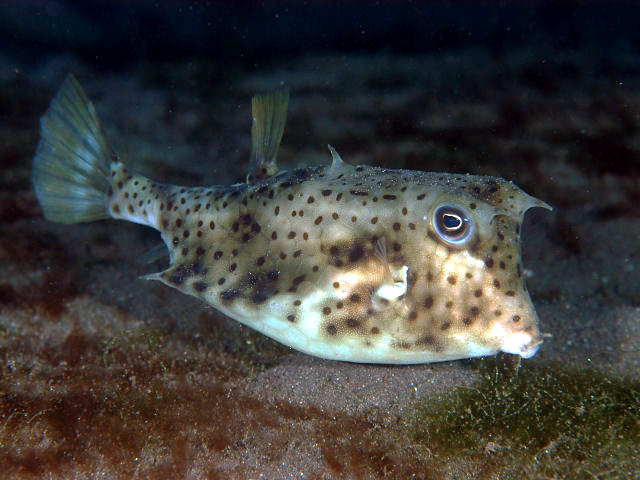

Conservation status
- Least Concern (IUCN 3.1)

Scientific classification
- Kingdom: Animalia
- Phylum: Chordata
- Class: Actinopterygii
- Division: Teleostei
- Order: Tetraodontiformes
- Family: Ostraciidae
- Genus: Lactoria
- Species: L. diaphana

Binomial name
- Lactoria diaphana (Bloch & Schneider, 1801)

Synonyms
- List: Ostracion diaphanum Bloch & Schneider, 1801; Ostracion brevicornis Temminck & Schlegel, 1850; Ostracion pentacanthus Bleeker, 1857; Lactoria schlemmeri D. S. Jordan & Snyder, 1904

= Lactoria diaphana =

Species of fish

Lactoria diaphana, the roundbelly cowfish, diaphonous cowfish, many-spined cowfish, spiny cowfish or transparent cowfish, is a species of marine ray-finned fish belonging to the family Ostraciidae, the boxfishes. This fish is found in the southeastern Atlantic Ocean and the Indo-Pacific.

== Taxonomy ==
Lactoria diaphana was first formally described as Ostracion diaphanum in 1801 by Marcus Elieser Bloch and Johann Gottlob Theaenus Schneider with no type locality given, although it is likely to be the East Indies. The 5th edition of Fishes of the World classifies the genus Lactoria within the family Ostraciidae in the suborder Ostracioidea within the order Tetraodontiformes.

=== Etymology ===
Lactoria diaphana is classified within the genus Lactoria, an name that means a "milkcow", a reference to the large spines above the eyes resembling the horns of a cow. The fishes in this genus are known as cowfishes, as are some related species. The specific name diaphana, means "transparent", as it appears that the holotype was a transparent juvenile.

== Distribution and habitat ==
Lactoria diaphana has a wide distribution in the Indo-Pacific where it extends from the eastern coast of Africa in the western Indian Ocean where it's found off Mozambique and South Africa through the Indian and Pacific Oceans as far as the eastern Pacific between Santa Barbara, California and Chile. It extends as far north as Japan and south to Tasmania. This species is the only member of the genus Lactoria with a range that extends into the southeastern Atlantic as it is found around the Cape of Good Hope and along the southwestern coast of Africa as far north as Swakopmund, Namibia.

The roundbelly cowfish is found on coastal and outer reefs, at depths down to 50 m (160 ft). The juveniles are semi-transparent and are found in pelagic waters close to the surface

== Description ==
Lactoria diaphana has a thick, rectangular body that is largely enclosed in a carapace which is made up of thickened, hexagonal plate -like scales which are jointed to each other. There are five horizontal ridges on the carapace, a poorly developed one along the back and a pair, upper and lower, on each flank. There is a large spine above each eye and a spine at the rear end of each of the lower flank ridges and there is a spine halfway along the ridge along the back. They have small mouths located at the front of the snout, with fleshy lips and a row of no more than 15 moderately sized conical teeth in each jaw. The gill slits are short and oblique and are to the front of the bases of the pectoral fins. The dorsa and anal fins are at the back of the carapace and the caudal peduncle is thin and flexible. The caudal fin is fan shaped. The dorsal fin has 9 soft rays, as does the anal fin. The dorsal profile of the snout is steep and concave while the vetral profile of the body is rounded. The overall colour i and concave while the ventrals pale greensih-grey patterned with a honeycomb reticulation and brown blotches. The roundbelly cowfish has a maximum total length of 34 cm (13 in).

== Toxicity ==
The thornback cowfish, like other boxfishes, has the ability to release a soap-like toxin called pahutoxin through their skin when stressed. This poison can incapacitate, or even kill, potential predators. There has also been a case in Japan of the death of someone ingesting the flesh of this species through palytoxin poisoning.
