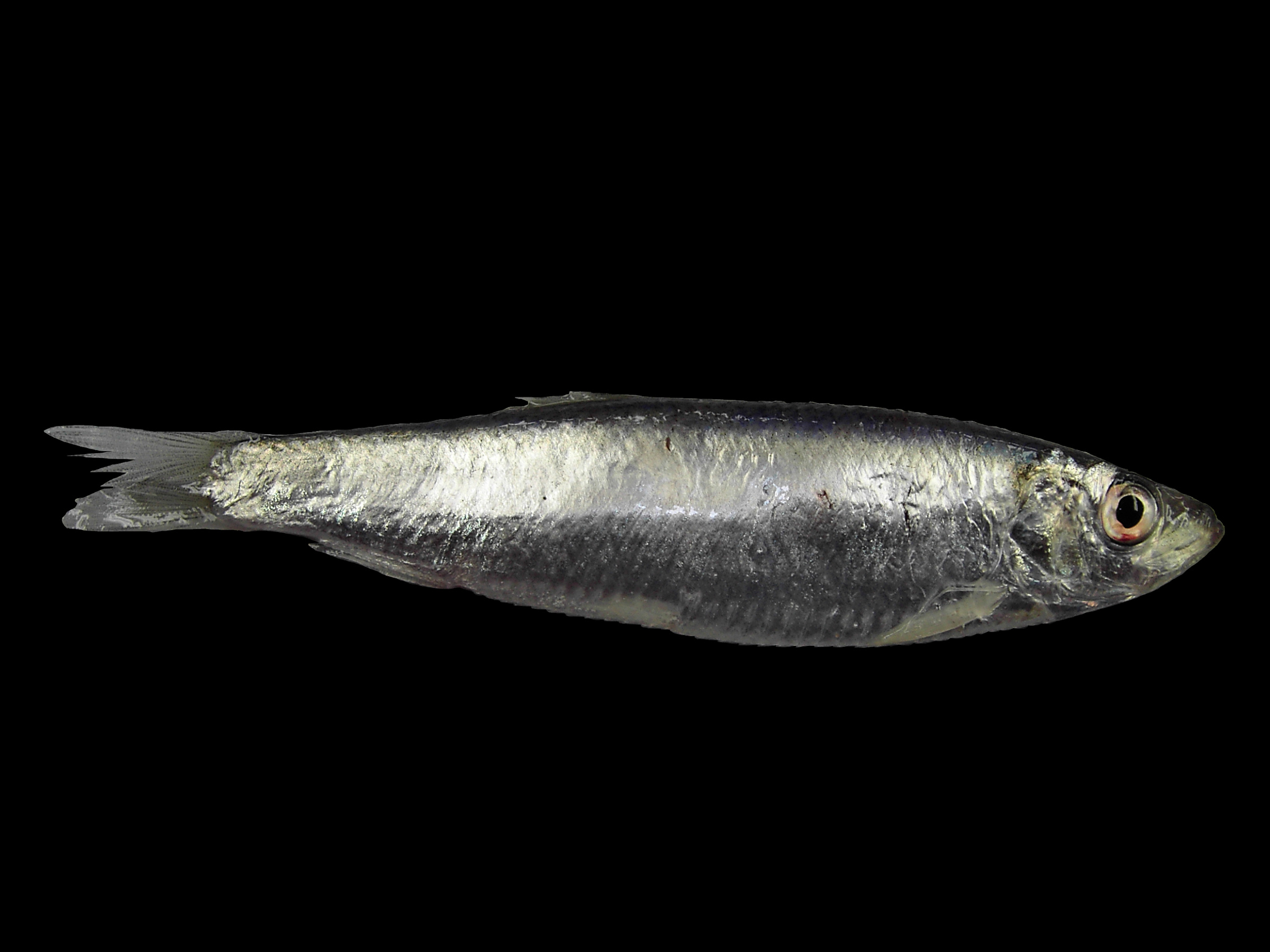

Conservation status
- Least Concern (IUCN 3.1)

Scientific classification
- Kingdom: Animalia
- Phylum: Chordata
- Class: Actinopterygii
- Division: Teleostei
- Order: Clupeiformes
- Family: Clupeidae
- Genus: Sprattus
- Species: S. sprattus

Binomial name
- Sprattus sprattus (Linnaeus, 1758)

Synonyms
- Alosa papalina Canestrini, 1872; Clupanodon phalerica Risso, 1827; Clupea latulus Cuvier, 1829; Clupea papalina Bonaparte, 1846; Clupea schoneveldii Krøyer, 1846; Clupea sprattus Linnaeus, 1758; Clupea sulinae Antipa, 1904; Meletta vulgaris Valenciennes, 1847; Spratella pumila Valenciennes, 1847; Spratella serdinka Nikolskii, 1923; Sprattus haleciformis Girgensohn, 1846

= European sprat =

Species of fish

The European sprat (Sprattus sprattus), also known as the Baltic herring, brisling, brisling sardine, bristling, garvie, garvock, Russian sardine, russlet, skipper or whitebait, is a species of small marine fish in the herring family Clupeidae. It is found in European, West Asian and North African waters. The fish is the subject of fisheries, particularly in Scandinavia, and is made into fish meal, as well as being used for human consumption. When used for food, it can be prepared in various ways, including canning, smoking and frying.

== Taxonomy ==
The European sprat was first described by Carl Linnaeus in 1758 in the 10th edition of Systema Naturae. The original binomial was Clupea sprattus, and it was later transferred to the genus Sprattus. Three subspecies are recognised: S. s. balticus (Baltic herring) from the Baltic Sea; S. s. phalericus from the Mediterranean, Adriatic and Black Seas; and S. s. sprattus from the eastern Atlantic.

== Description ==
The European sprat is a small fish growing to a maximum length of 16 cm (6.3 in), but more often in the 8–12 cm (3.1–4.7 in) range. It is fairly elongate and rather laterally compressed, with a keel-like row of sharp scales along the belly. The lower jaw projects slightly, there are rarely any vomerine teeth on the roof of the mouth and the hind edge of the gill covers is smoothly rounded, without any fleshy protuberances. The dorsal and anal fins have no spines, and contains 13-21 and 12-23 soft rays respectively. The origin of the pelvic fins, which have 7 (occasionally 8) soft rays, is immediately below or in front of the dorsal-fin origin. This fish has a bluish or greenish back and silvery flanks, with no dark spotting.

== Distribution ==
The European sprat is native to the northeastern Atlantic Ocean. Its range includes the Baltic Sea, the North Sea, southern Norway and Sweden, the coasts of the British Isles, the Iberian Peninsula, Morocco, the Mediterranean Sea (including the Adriatic Sea) and the Black Sea. It occurs both in open water well away from the coast and in bays and estuaries, being able to tolerate salinities as low as 4 parts per thousand. It is a schooling fish (like many other species in its family) and migrates between its winter feeding grounds and its summer breeding grounds. The European sprat also makes vertical migrations, rising to near the surface at night to feed.

== Ecology ==
Adult European sprats feed on copepods, such as species in the genera Calanus, Pseudocalanus and Temora; on the other hand, juveniles feed on the eggs and larvae of these crustaceans, and on diatoms. Breeding takes place at any time of the year, but peaks between December and April in the Mediterranean and between April and August in the Baltic Sea and northeastern Atlantic. Spawning may take place in inshore waters or up to 100 km (60 mi) off the coast.

This fish is sometimes parasitised by the copepod Lernaeenicus sprattae. That animal burrows into the eyes of the European sprat, causing loss of visual acuity or even blindness. Heavy infestations can even result in death.

== Relationship with humans ==
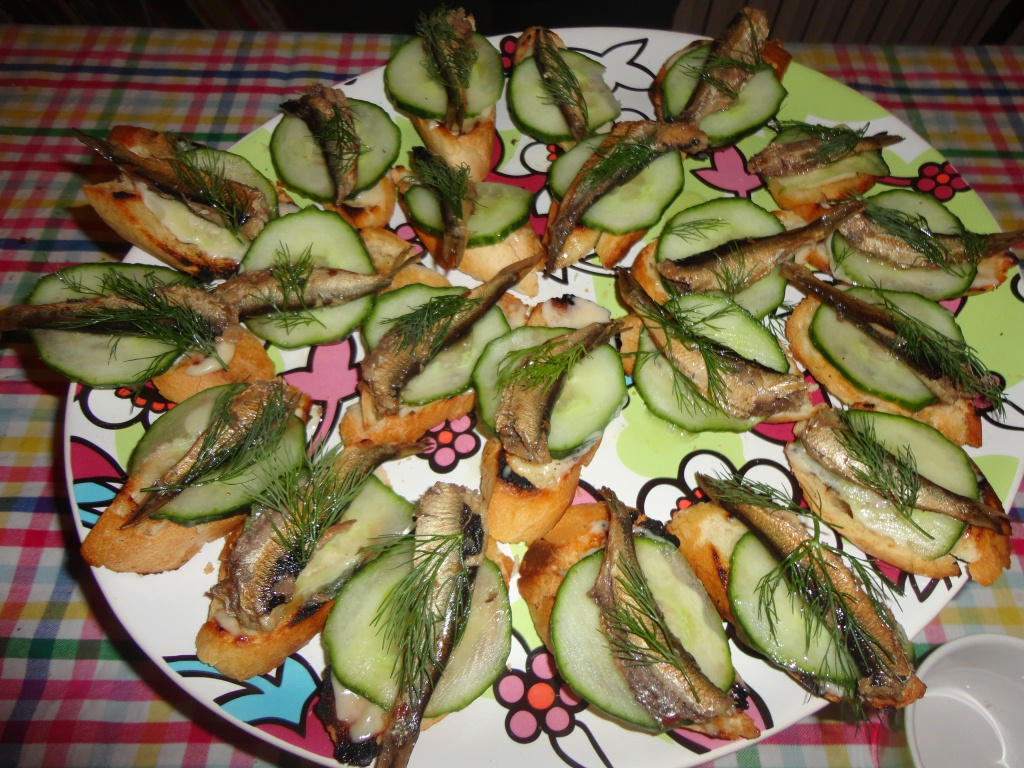
Canapés with smoked sprats, a common Russian zakuska

There are substantial fisheries for the European Sprat in various parts of its range. It is mostly caught by trawling and is made into fish meal or fish bait, or used for consumption. It can be canned, smoked, marinated, salted, breaded, fried, deep fried, boiled, grilled, baked, broiled, or eaten fresh. Canned sprats, usually smoked, are available in many European countries, including the Baltic states, Scandinavia, Ireland, Germany, Poland and Russia. In the UK, canned brisling (i.e. young sprat) was popularized by Angus Watson, initially under the brand name Skippers Sardines and latter under simply Skippers (due to a lawsuit from French canners around 1910).

== Conservation status ==
Global capture production of European sprat in thousand tonnes from 1950 to 2022, as reported by FAO

The European sprat has large swings in its population size, particularly in the Mediterranean Sea and the Black Sea. These may in part be due to the increasing dominance of the comb jelly (Mnemiopsis leidyi), which in turn might be related to increases in sea temperature. Landings by commercial fisheries in the Mediterranean and Black Seas fell in the 1990s, but recovered in the next decade. The current population size and trend of this fish is unknown, and the IUCN assesses this species as Least Concern.

== Nutrition information ==
	Per 100 g (drained weight, approx)
Energy	718 kJ
Protein	18.3 g
Fat - total:	11 g
saturated (max)	2.2 g
trans (max)	0 g
polyunsaturated (max)	3 g
Omega-3	1.64g
monounsaturated	4.7 g
Carbohydrate	0 g
-Sugars	0 g
Sodium	200 mg
Calcium	97 mg
