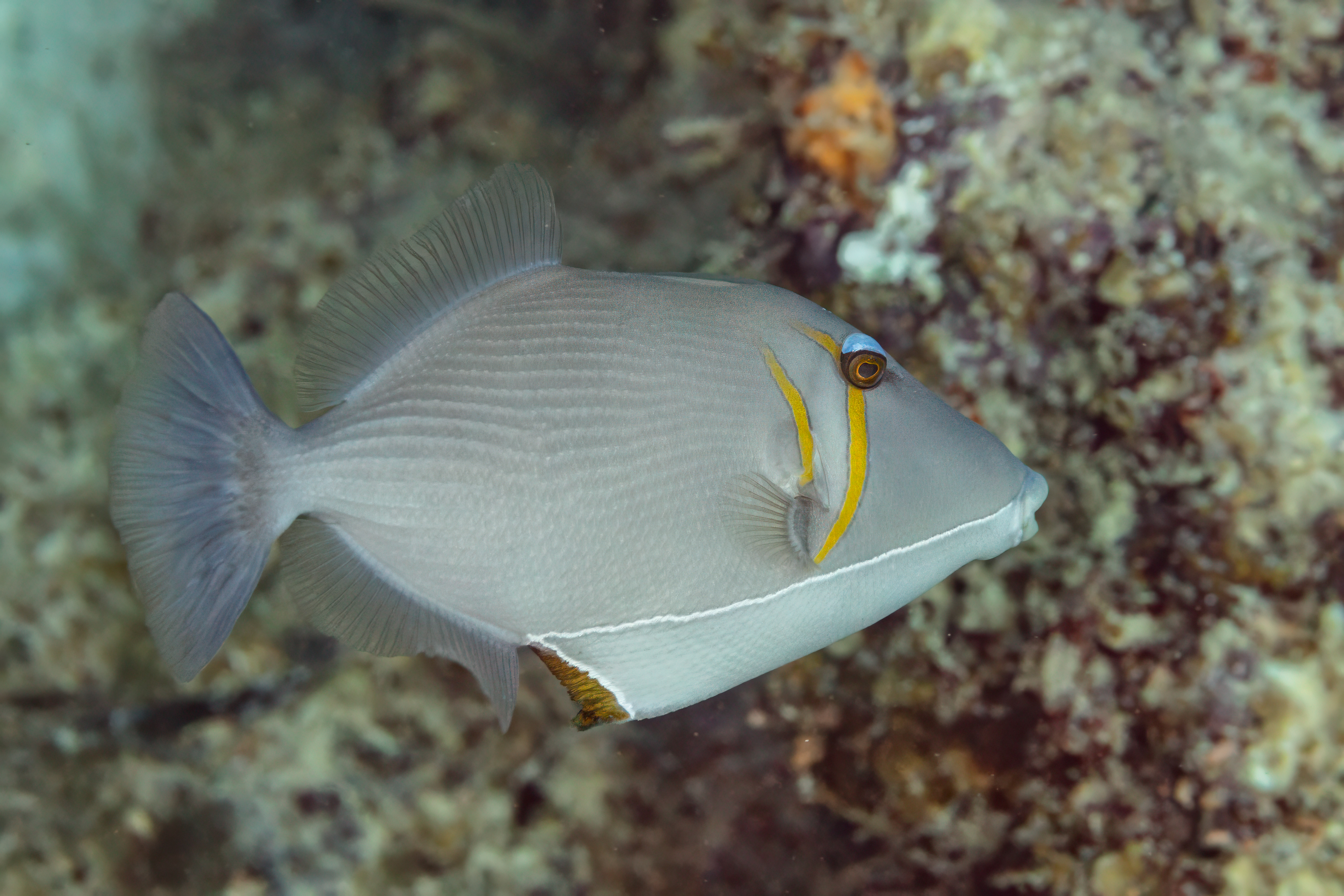

Conservation status
- Least Concern (IUCN 3.1)

Scientific classification
- Kingdom: Animalia
- Phylum: Chordata
- Class: Actinopterygii
- Division: Teleostei
- Order: Tetraodontiformes
- Family: Balistidae
- Genus: Sufflamen
- Species: S. bursa

Binomial name
- Sufflamen bursa (Bloch & J. G. Schneider, 1801)

= Sufflamen bursa =

Species of fish

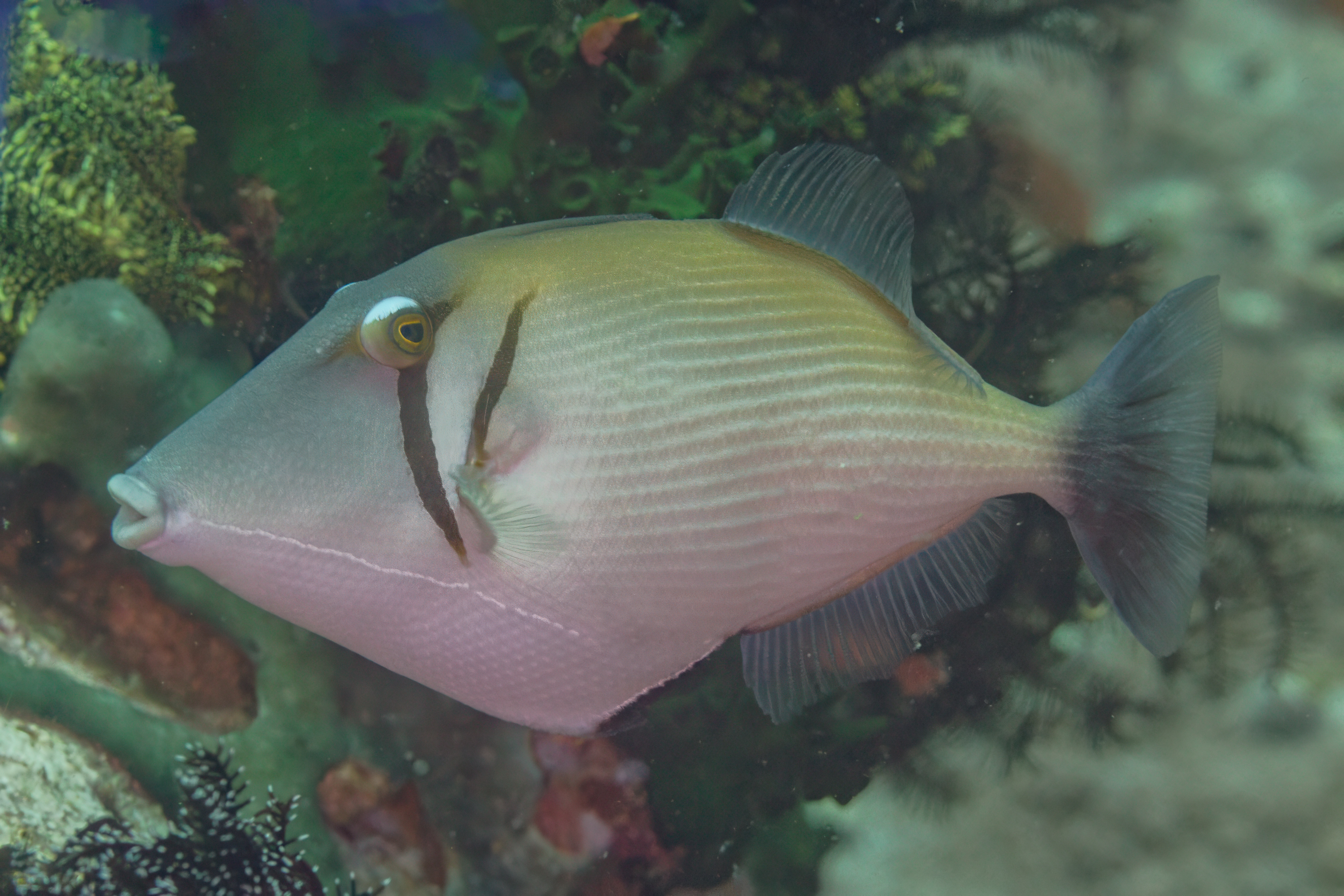
In the Philippines

Sufflamen bursa, the lei triggerfish, bursa triggerfish, scythe triggerfish or boomerang triggerfish, is a triggerfish from the Indo-Pacific. Its name is derived from the two markings behind its eyes that wrap around the fish similar to a Hawaiian lei. The color of these markings changes depending on the fish's mood, in which case the colors may alter from yellow, dark brown, and black. It is a species of reef fish found in reef ecosystems in the Indo-Pacific, including Japan, Australia, and Hawaii. It occasionally makes its way into the aquarium trade.

== Distribution and habitat ==
Sufflamen bursa inhabits regions of a coral reef before a surge zone as to avoid the chaos and general dissonance within the water where waves crash. This species lives in warm shallow waters with sandy and reefy bottoms. In the presence of a predator, they hide in reef crevices and do this especially at night. They inhabit a variety of different reef systems across tropical and subtropical regions of the Pacific and Indo-Pacific.

== Description ==
Sufflamen bursa shares a similar body plan as other triggerfish species in the Balistidae family, which include a rectangular body, pectoral, anal, caudal, dorsal and pelvic fins; and a toothy snout that is more reminiscent of a beak. It grows to a size of 25 cm in length. S. bursa is generally pale, but it can change to a darker color, typically a shade of brown with hints of purple on the anal, ventral, and caudal fins. A single white strip runs down from its mouth to the base of its pectoral fin while two stripes, which are either brown or yellow depending on the mood of the fish, run down vertically. One stripe goes through the eye and the other behind the eye along the gills on either side.

Similar to other triggerfish species, they have locked spines at the base of their caudal fin which they use as a weapon of self-defense against predators. Although it isn’t unheard of that these fish use their spines when provoked. Like their relatives in the Balistidae Family, they have tough teeth that somewhat resemble a beak. S. bursa have tiny barbs on their scales which repel urchin spines, making them impervious to their venom.

== Behavior ==
They are usually solitary creatures, but it isn’t uncommon for them to travel in pairs. In rarer circumstances, they can be seen swimming in trios. They generally inhabit shallow and warm waters of the tropics and subtropics. When these fish aren’t feeding, they patrol and hover around the reef, especially near areas that greatly vary in depth and topography in order to have easy access to a hiding spot from predators.

Sufflamen bursa, like their relatives, are carnivorous and secondary consumers. Their diet includes shrimps, sea urchins, worms, crabs, smaller fish, and other invertebrates. They don’t eat coral but instead will prey upon and pick at clams and other animals that attach themselves to live rocks or corals This behavioral trait helps to mitigate populations such as rock-boring creatures like sea urchins when there is an overabundance in a certain population of a species that they feed upon. They don’t seclude themselves from picking off crustaceans and mollusks from rocks. They will actively seek out prey such as smaller fish. They also flip sea urchins upside down to access their soft bellies which are defended with significantly less spines. Since they are consumers, they are also susceptible to parasites and diseases.

At the Seattle Aquarium

== Human use and cultural significance ==
Sufflamen bursa have proven to be edible as well. They have been described to have a sweet flavor somewhat similar to crab or grouper. Regardless if it is eaten raw or cooked and it’s generally discouraged to use seasoning because it’s already tasty. Like other foods, they’re generally used in bigger dishes as an ingredient such as sushi. Additionally, they are eaten grilled, raw, or seared.
