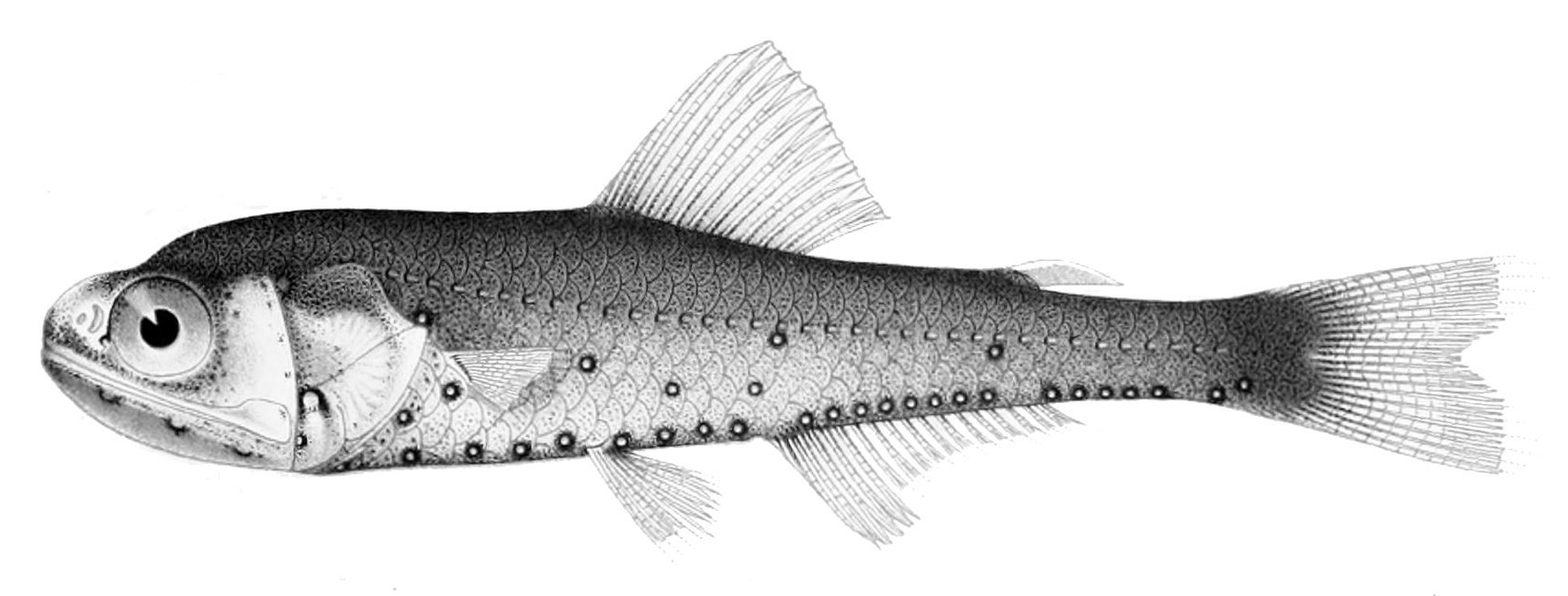

Conservation status
- Least Concern (IUCN 3.1)

Scientific classification
- Kingdom: Animalia
- Phylum: Chordata
- Class: Actinopterygii
- Division: Teleostei
- Order: Myctophiformes
- Family: Myctophidae
- Genus: Symbolophorus
- Species: S. evermanni

Binomial name
- Symbolophorus evermanni (Gilbert, 1905)

= Symbolophorus evermanni =

Species of fish

Symbolophorus evermanni is a species of fish in the family Myctophidae. It is widely distributed in the Indian and Pacific Oceans. The specific name evermanni honors ichthyologist Barton Warren Evermann. It is also known as Evermann's lanternfish or Evermann's lantern fish.

Symbolophorus evermanni grows to 8 cm (3.1 in) standard length. Parasites of Symbolophorus evermanni include the copepod Peniculus hokutoae.

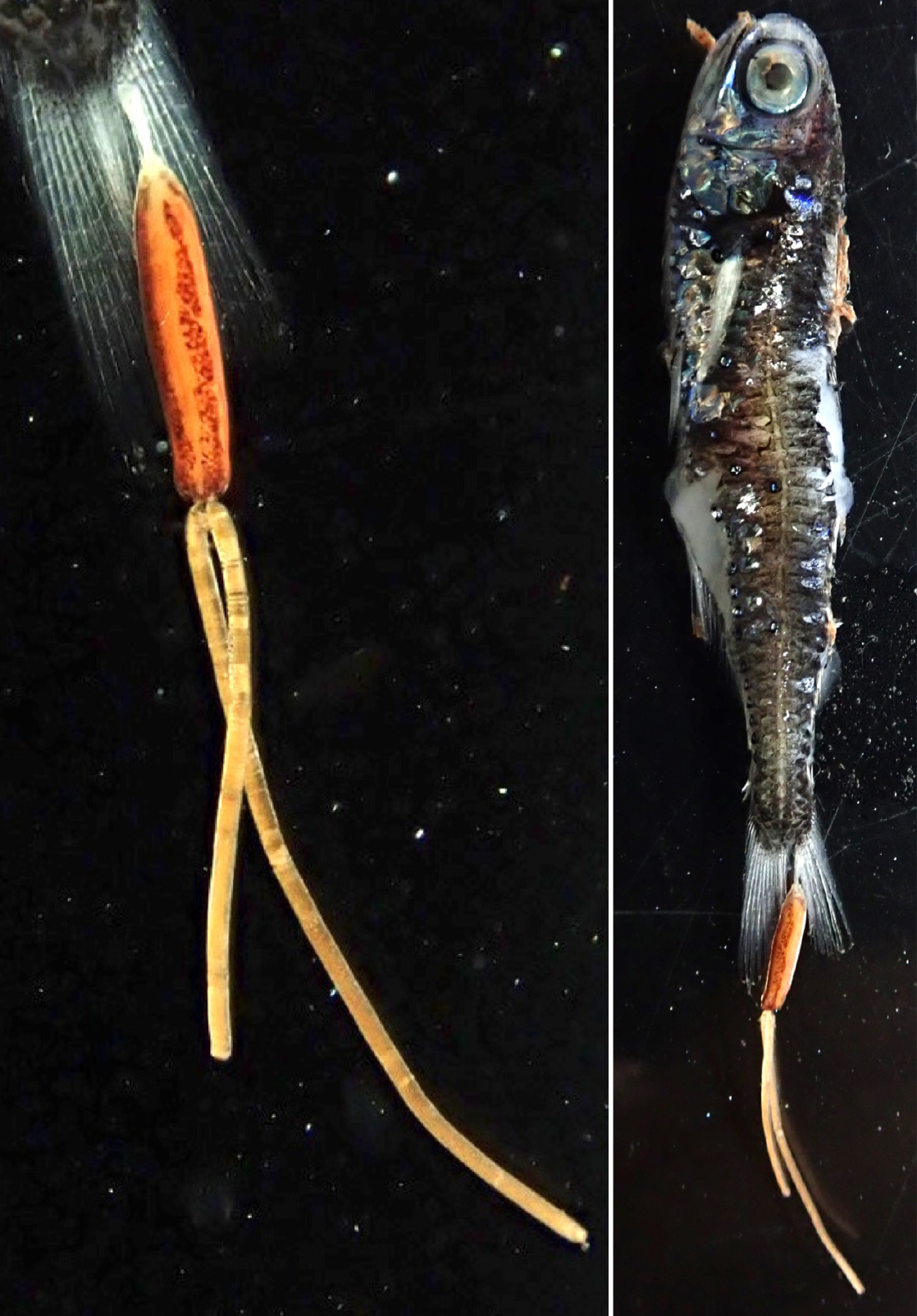
Peniculus hokutoae attached to Symbolophorus evermanni.
