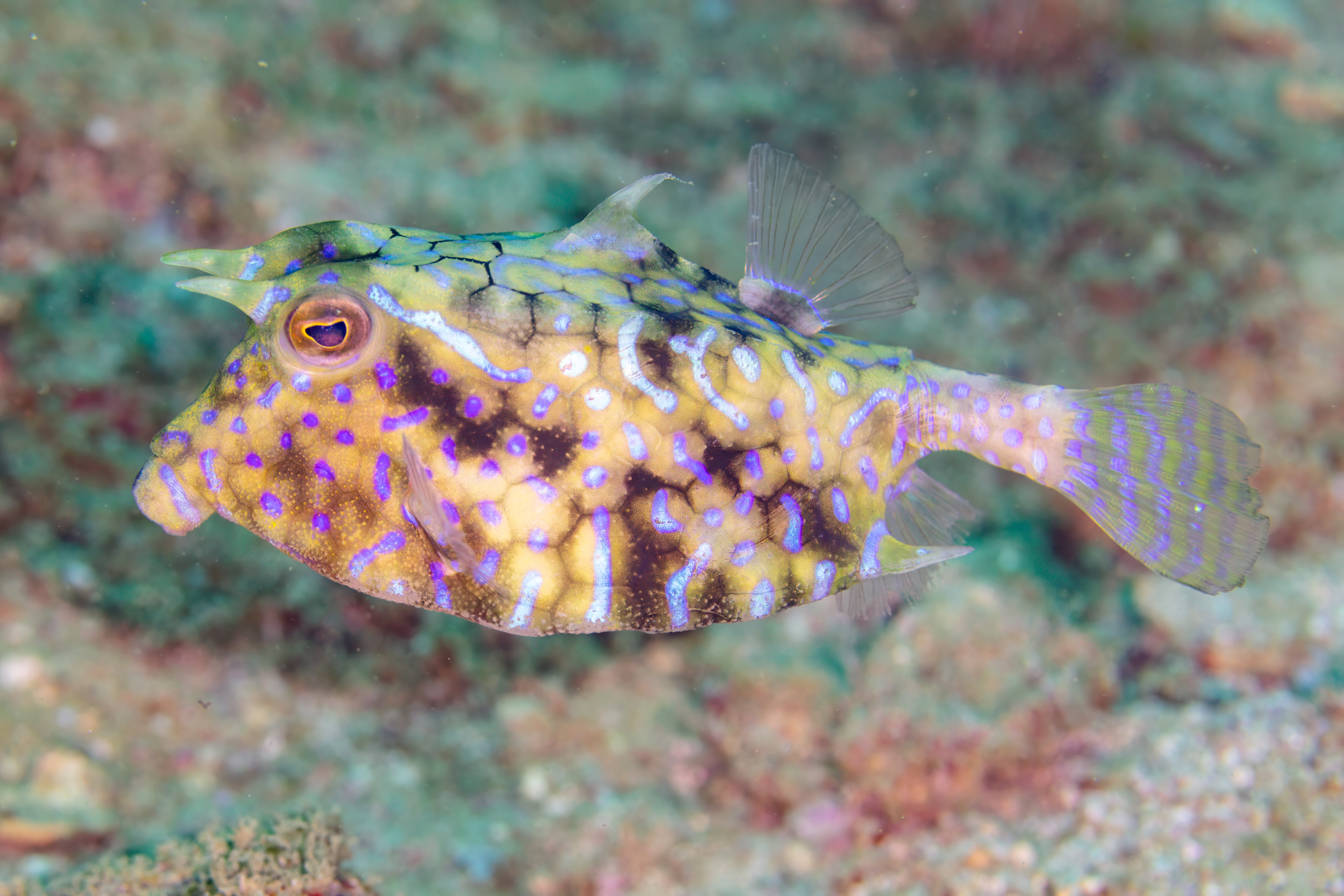
- In the Seychelles

Conservation status
- Least Concern (IUCN 3.1)

Scientific classification
- Kingdom: Animalia
- Phylum: Chordata
- Class: Actinopterygii
- Division: Teleostei
- Order: Tetraodontiformes
- Family: Ostraciidae
- Genus: Lactoria
- Species: L. fornasini

Binomial name
- Lactoria fornasini Bianconi, 1846

Synonyms
- List: Ostracion fornasini Bianconi, 1846; Ostracion pentacanthus Bleeker, 1857; Lactoria pentacanthus (Bleeker, 1857); Lactoria fuscomaculata von Bonde, 1923; Lactoria galeodon Jenkins, 1903

= Thornback cowfish =

Species of fish

The thornback cowfish (Lactoria fornasini), is a species of marine ray-finned fish belonging to the family Ostraciidae, the boxfishes. This species is found throughout the tropical Indo-Pacific from East Africa to the Bass Islands (French Polynesia). It can grow to a maximum length of 23 cm (9 in). It is an uncommon fish that feeds on small invertebrates that it picks up off the sea bed.

== Taxonomy ==
The longhorn cowfish was first formally described as Ostracion fornasini in 1846 by the Italian zoologist Giovanni Giuseppe Bianconi with its type locality given as Mozambique. The 5th edition of Fishes of the World classifies the genus Lactoria within the family Ostraciidae in the suborder Ostracioidea within the order Tetraodontiformes.

=== Etymology ===
The thornback cowfish is classified within the genus Lactoria, a name that means a "milkcow", a reference to the large spines above the eyes resembling the horns of a cow. The fishes in this genus are known as cowfishes, as are some related species. The specific epithet fornasini is in honour of Italian amateur naturalist Carlo Antonio Fornasini, who worked in Mozambique.

== Distribution and habitat ==
The thornback cowfish is native to the tropical Indo-Pacific region between 32°N and 32°S. Its range extends from the east coast of Africa between Tanzania and South Africa and the island of Madagascar, to Japan, Indonesia, Australia, Hawaii and Rapa Island. It occurs in areas of sand, rubble, corals and algae both in lagoons and on the seaward side of reefs. It can be found as deep as 132 m (433 ft) but a more normal depth range is between about 6 and 30 m (20 and 100 ft).

== Description ==
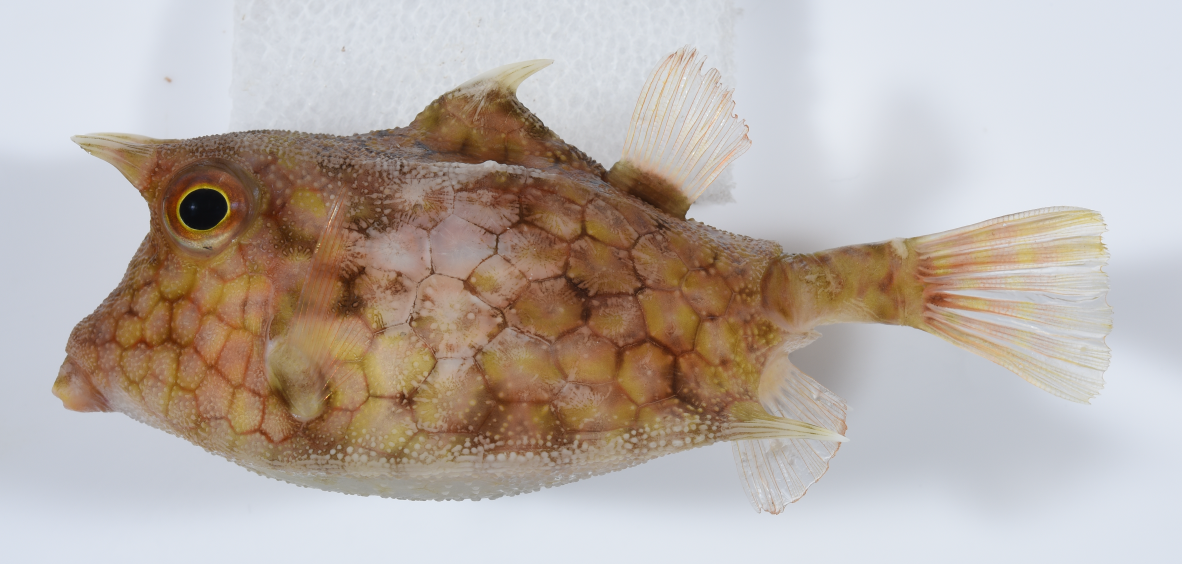
In Western Australia

The thornback cowfish, like other members of the family Ostraciidae, has hexagonal, plate-like scales which are fused together to form a solid, box-like carapace, from which the eyes, mouth, fins and tail protrude. The mouth is small and has protruding lips, the upper profile of the snout is straight, the back is somewhat convex, the flanks are concave and the belly rounded, causing the fish to resemble a purse. There are small pre-ocular spines on either side of the head, a large spine projects from the dorsal ridge and a further moderate-sized spine projects from each of the pelvic ridges near the anal fin. Neither the dorsal fin nor the anal fin has any spines but both have nine soft rays, while the caudal fin is fan-shaped and has ten rays. A typical length for this fish is 15 cm (6 in); the colour is variable, and changes to match the fish's surroundings; generally pale tan with spots or wiggly markings in yellow, mauve or blue. In some regions, this fish is toxic.

== Biology ==
In Indonesia

The thornback cowfish is usually solitary but the males are territorial in the breeding season. The diet consists of small invertebrates, which are exposed by jets of water from the mouth blowing away sand, and picked up by suction from the sea bed. It is an uncommon species.

=== Toxicity ===
The thornback cowfish, like other boxfishes, has the ability to release a soap-like toxin called pahutoxin through their skin when stressed. This poison can incapacitate, or even kill, potential predators.

== Gallery ==
Juvenile

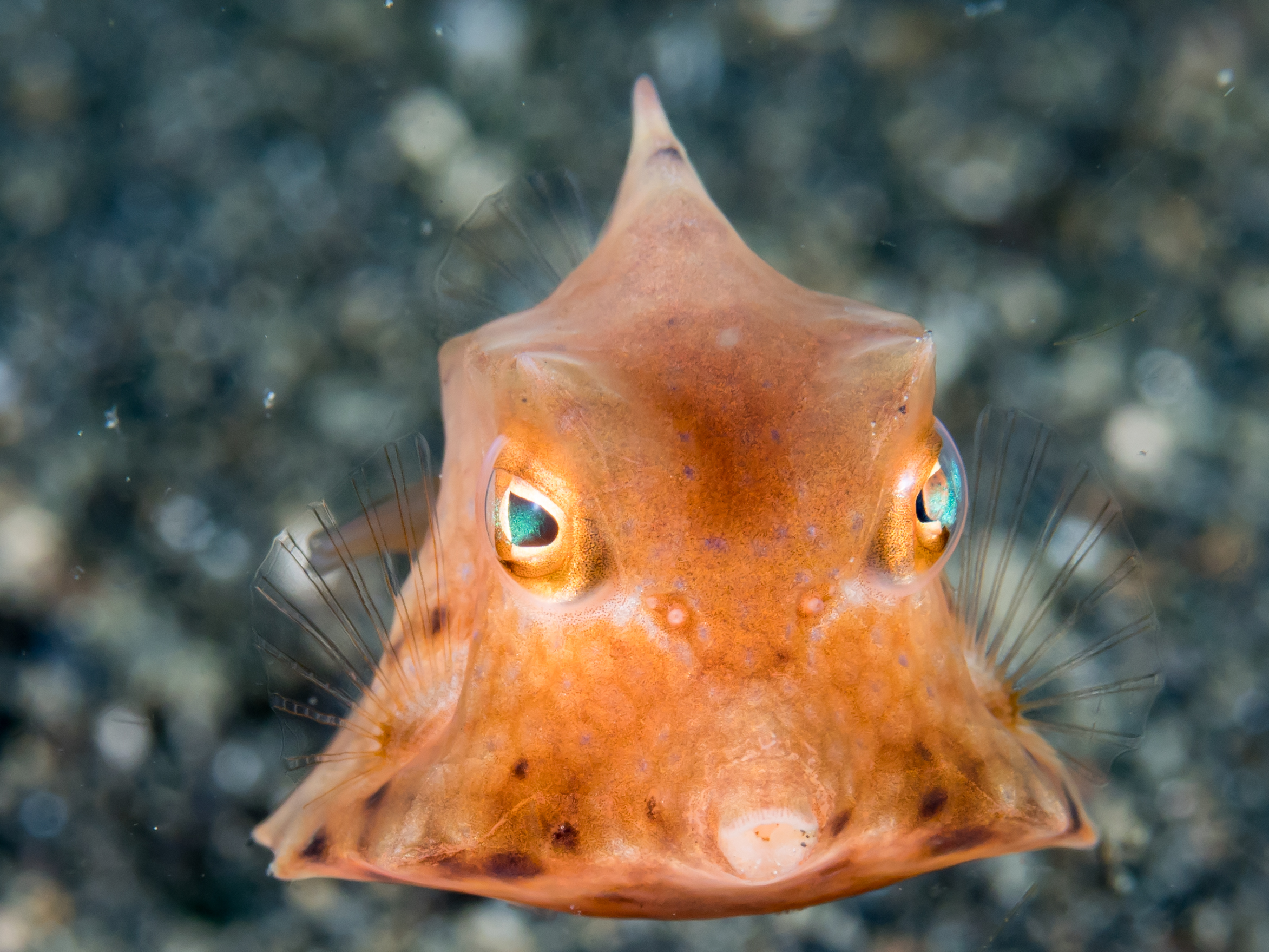
Front view, in Indonesia

In Indonesia
