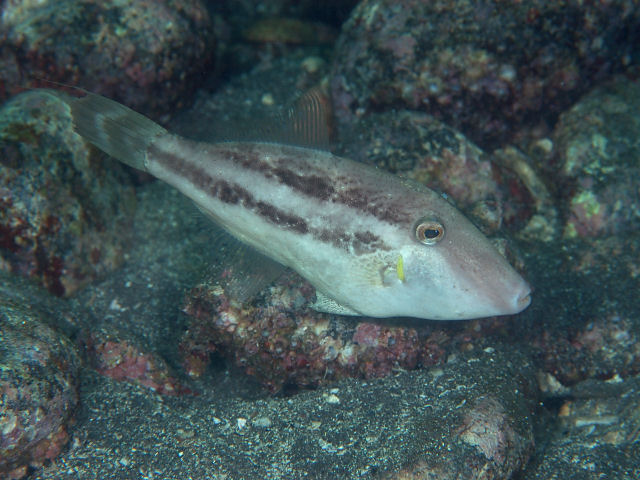
- Paramonacanthus japonicus

Scientific classification
- Kingdom: Animalia
- Phylum: Chordata
- Class: Actinopterygii
- Order: Tetraodontiformes
- Family: Monacanthidae
- Genus: Paramonacanthus; Bleeker, 1865

= Paramonacanthus =

Genus of fishes

Paramonacanthus is a genus of filefishes native to the Indian and Pacific Oceans.

== Species ==
There are currently 11 recognized species in this genus:

- Paramonacanthus arabicus Hutchins, 1997
- Paramonacanthus choirocephalus (Bleeker, 1852)
- Paramonacanthus cryptodon (Bleeker, 1855)
- Paramonacanthus curtorhynchos (Bleeker, 1855)
- Paramonacanthus filicauda (Günther, 1880)
- Paramonacanthus frenatus (Peters, 1855)
- Paramonacanthus japonicus (Tilesius, 1809)
- Paramonacanthus lowei Hutchins, 1997
- Paramonacanthus matsuurai Hutchins, 1997
- Paramonacanthus nematophorus (Günther, 1870)
- Paramonacanthus nipponensis (Kamohara, 1939)
- Paramonacanthus oblongus (Temminck & Schlegel, 1850)
- Paramonacanthus otisensis Whitley, 1931
- Paramonacanthus pusillus (Rüppell, 1829)
- Paramonacanthus sulcatus (Hollard, 1854)
- Paramonacanthus tricuspis (Hollard, 1854)

== Gallery ==
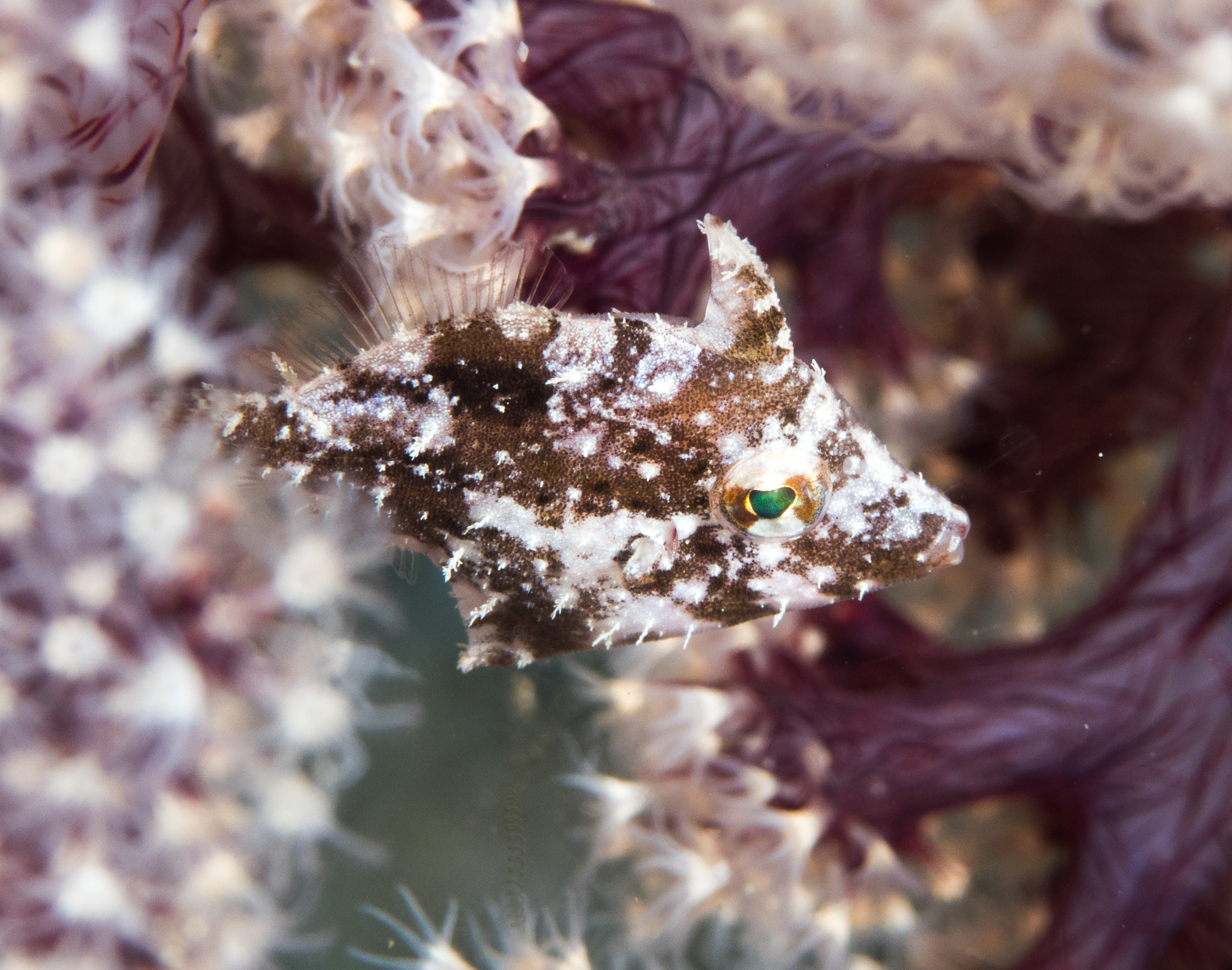
Paramonacanthus choirocephalus at Raja Ampat, 2020

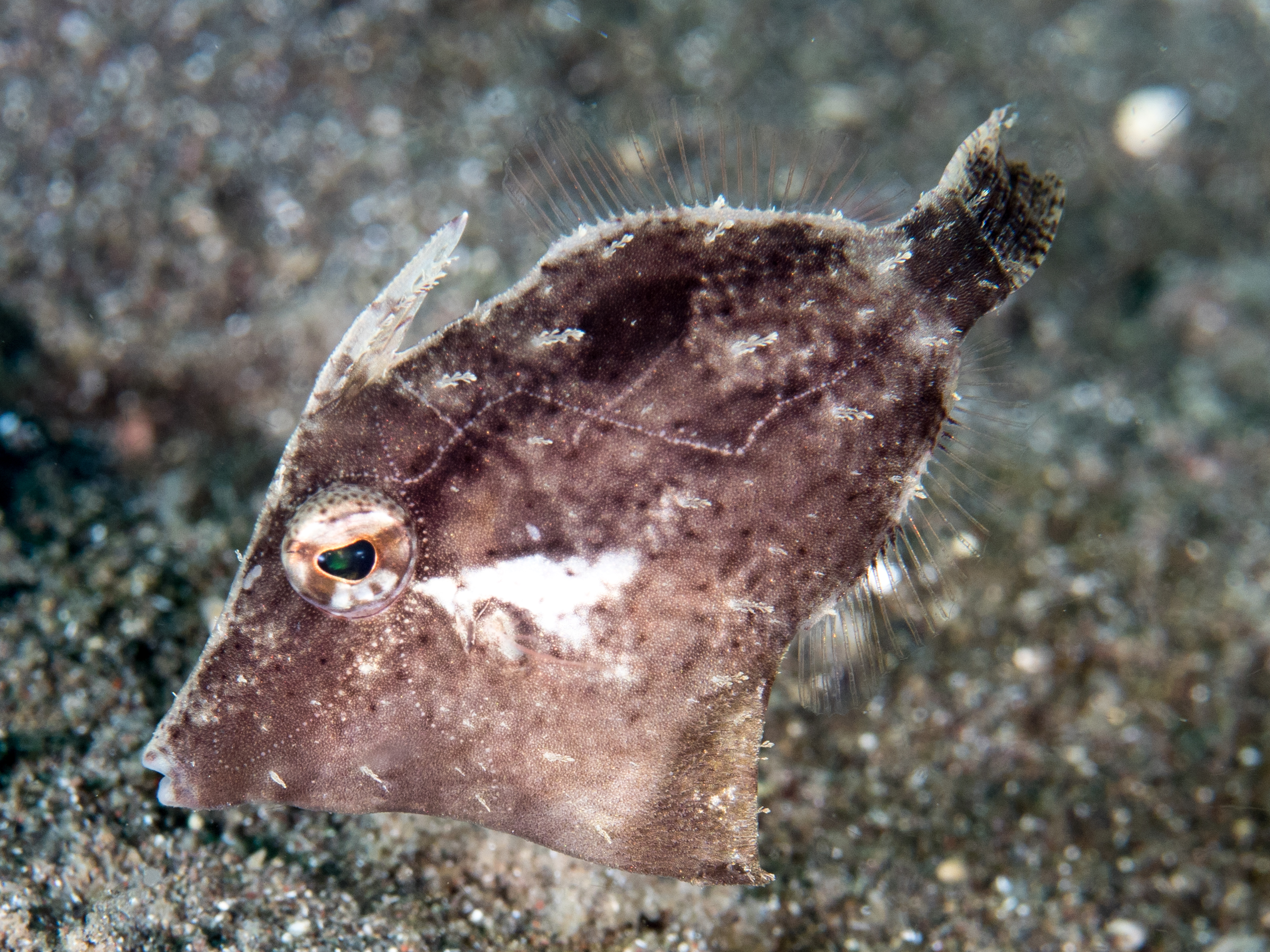
Paramonacanthus choirocephalus at Lembeh, 2018

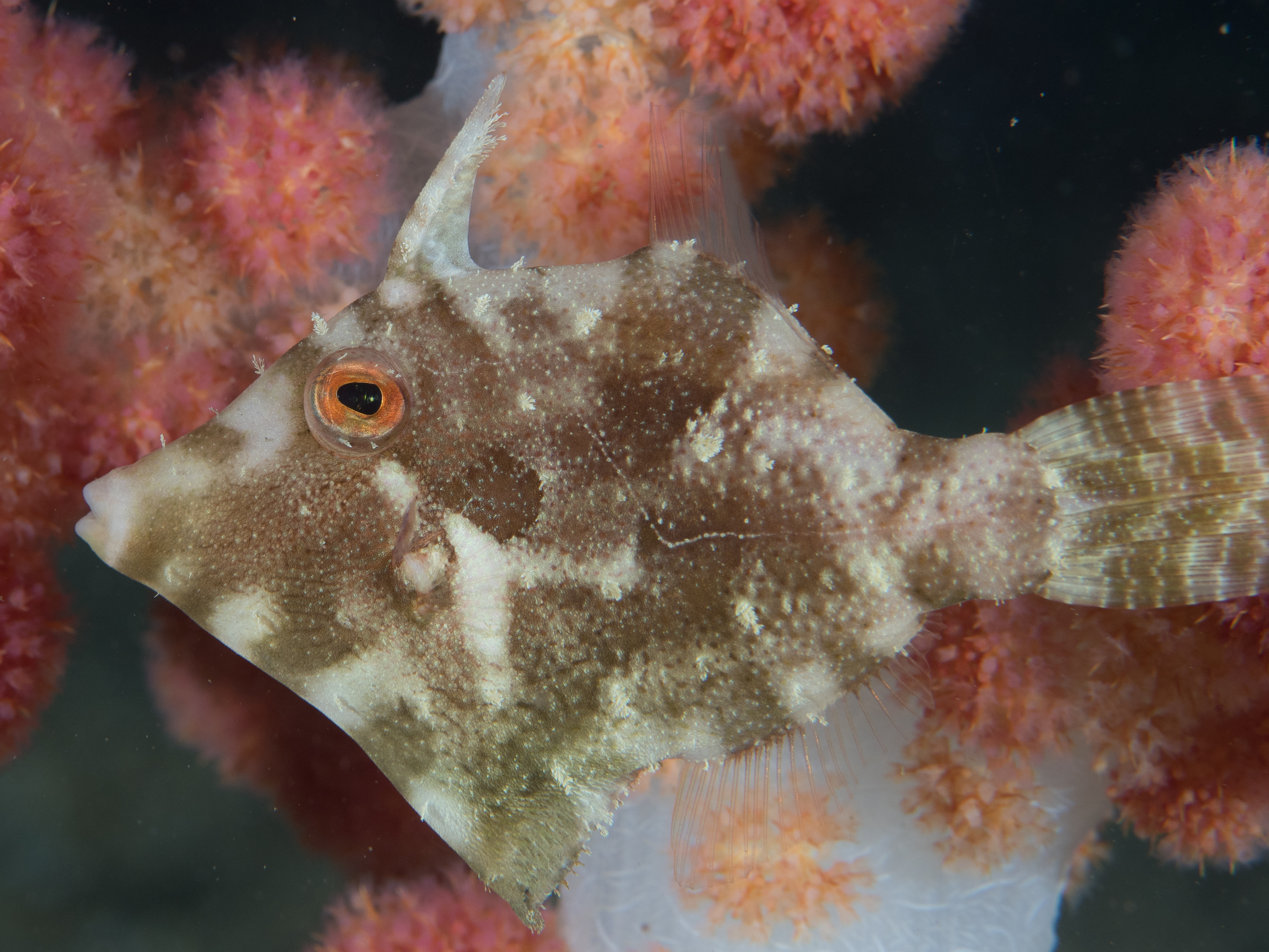
Paramonacanthus choirocephalus at Lembeh, 2018
