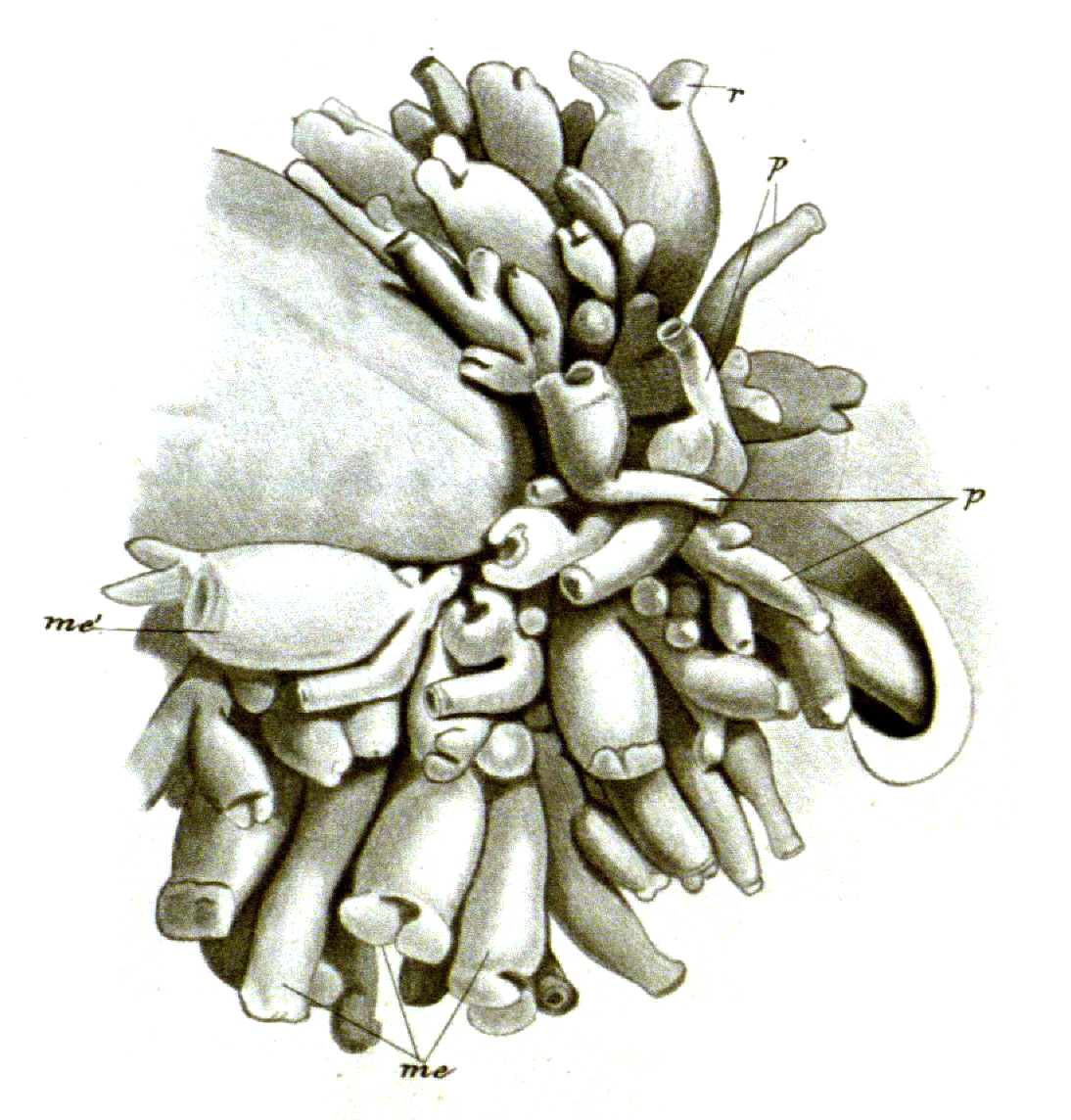
- Hydrichthys sarcotretis colony

Scientific classification
- Kingdom: Animalia
- Phylum: Cnidaria
- Class: Hydrozoa
- Order: Anthoathecata
- Family: Pandeidae
- Genus: Hydrichthys; Fewkes, 1887

Species
- See text

= Hydrichthys =

Genus of marine parasites

Hydrichthys is a genus of colonial marine hydrozoans formerly placed in the family Hydrichthyidae but is now included in the family Pandeidae. The polyps of members of this genus are parasitic. The polyp attaches itself to a fish, and in one species exhibits hyperparasitism by attaching itself to a copepod, itself the parasite of a fish.

== Parasitism ==
The life history of hydrozoans typically has a larval, polyp stage and a bell-shaped medusa stage. In Hydrichthys, the polyp has no tentacles but develops a root-like stolon which it thrusts through the skin of its host, usually a fish, to suck the blood and body fluids. During the medusa stage, Hydrichthys lives independently in the ocean. In one species, Hydrichthys sarcotretis, parasitism is taken a stage further when the hydrozoan attaches itself to the copepod Cardiodectes medusaeus. This is itself an ectoparasite of lanternfish in the family Myctophidae. The copepod attaches itself to the bulbus arteriosus of the fish. Such a parasitic chain is known as hyperparasitism. The actions of the copepod castrate its fish host. Both male and female fish do not reproduce and seem to grow faster when attacked by the copepod and it seems to have a negligible energy demand from them. The hydrozoan parasite castrates the copepod, a process called hypercastration.

== Species ==
The World Register of Marine Species recognizes the following species:

- Hydrichthys boycei Warren, 1916
- Hydrichthys cyclothonis Damas, 1934
- Hydrichthys mirus Fewkes, 1887
- Hydrichthys pacificus Miyashita, 1941
- Hydrichthys pietschi Martin, 1975
- Hydrichthys sarcotretis (Jungersen, 1913)
