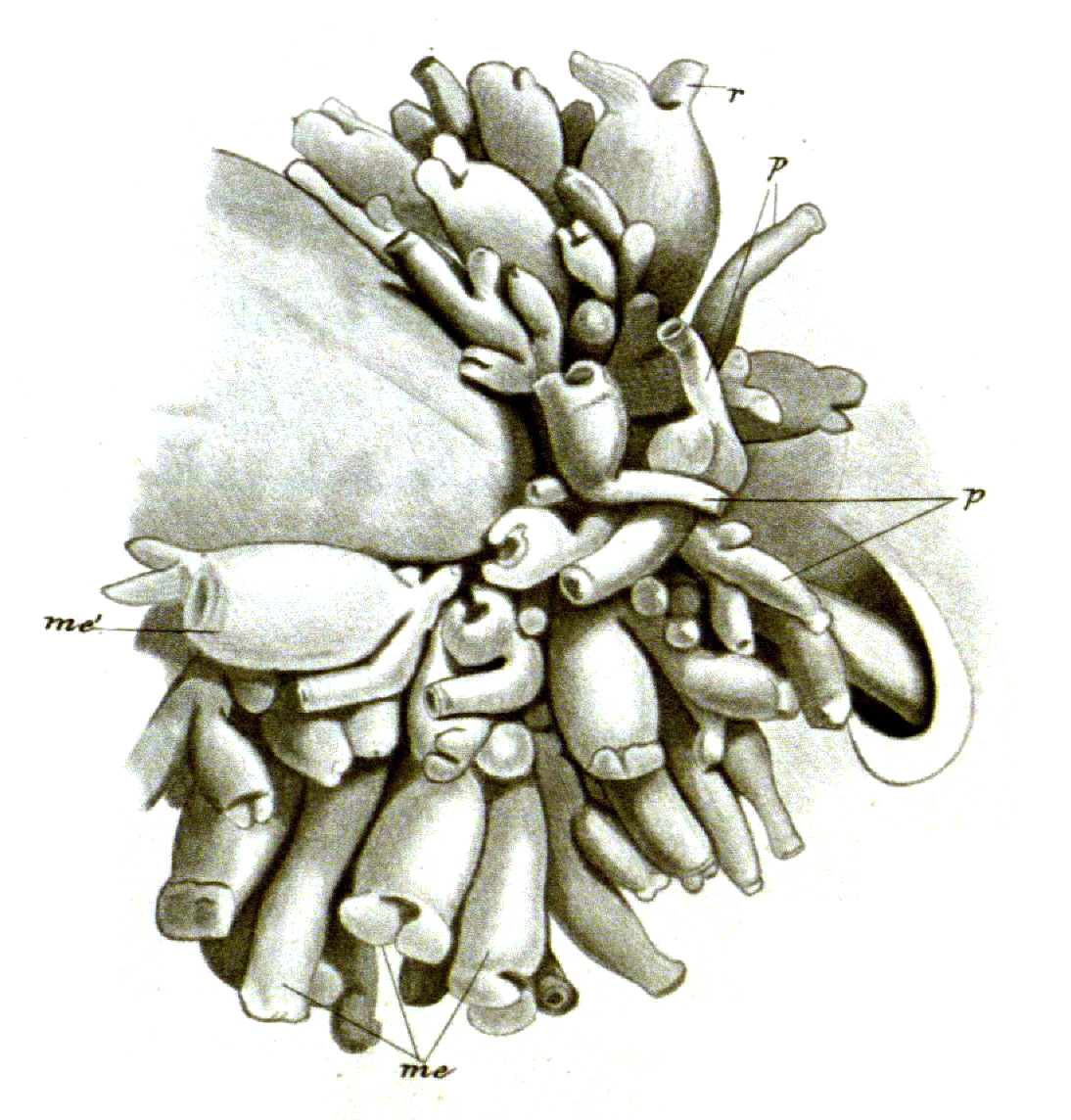

Scientific classification
- Kingdom: Animalia
- Phylum: Cnidaria
- Class: Hydrozoa
- Order: Anthoathecata
- Family: Pandeidae
- Genus: Hydrichthys
- Species: H. sarcotretis

Binomial name
- Hydrichthys sarcotretis (Jungersen, 1913)

Synonyms
- Ichthyocodium sarcotretis Jungersen, 1913

= Hydrichthys sarcotretis =

Species of marine parasite

Hydrichthys sarcotretis is a species of colonial marine hydrozoans now included in the family Pandeidae. The polyps of members of this genus are parasitic and attach themselves to a fish. H. sarcotretis is a species that exhibits hyperparasitism by attaching itself to a copepod, itself the parasite of a fish.

In H. sarcotretis, parasitism is taken a stage further when the hydrozoan attaches itself to the copepod Cardiodectes medusaeus. This is itself an ectoparasite of the Northern lampfish (Stenobrachius leucopsarus) in the family Myctophidae. The copepod attaches itself to the bulbus arteriosus of the fish. Such a parasitic chain is known as hyperparasitism. The actions of the copepod castrate its fish host. Both male and female fish do not reproduce and seem to grow faster when attacked by the copepod and it seems to have a negligible energy demand from them. The hydrozoan parasite castrates the copepod, a process called hypercastration.
