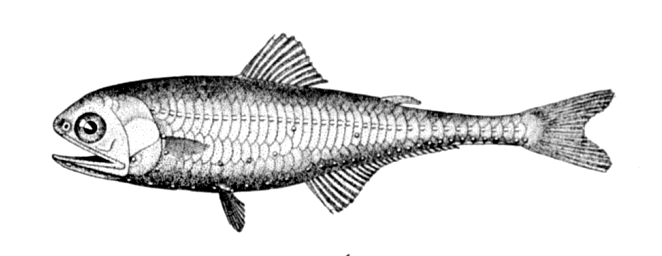

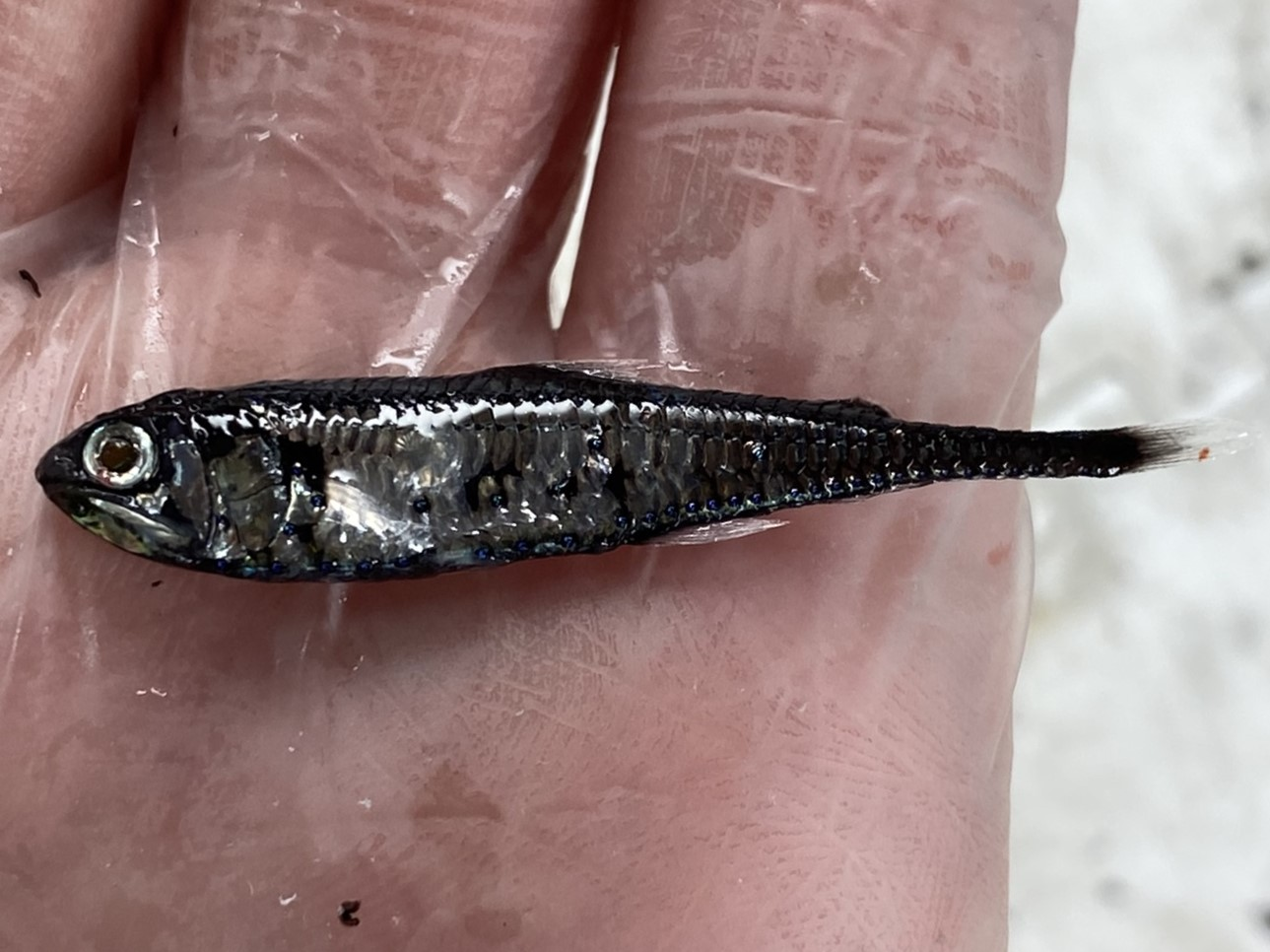

Conservation status
- Least Concern (IUCN 3.1)

Scientific classification
- Kingdom: Animalia
- Phylum: Chordata
- Class: Actinopterygii
- Order: Myctophiformes
- Family: Myctophidae
- Genus: Gonichthys
- Species: G. cocco

Binomial name
- Gonichthys cocco Cocco, 1829

Synonyms
- List: Alysia loricata Lowe, 1839; Gonichthys coccoi Cocco, 1829; Myctophum coccoi Cocco, 1829; Myctophum hians Richardson, 1845 Rhinoscopelus cocco; Cocco, 1829 Rhinoscopelus coccoi; Cocco, 1829 Scopelus cocco; Cocco, 1829 Scopelus coccoi; Günther, 1864 Scopelus gracile; Lütken, 1892 Scopelus gracilis; Lütken, 1892 Scopelus jagorii; Peters, 1859

= Gonichthys cocco =

Species of ray-finned fish

Gonichthys cocco, often called the Cocco's lanternfish, is a species of oceanodromous lanternfish. It was named by Anastasio Cocco.

== Distribution and habitat ==
It lives in the Eastern and Western Atlantic, near areas like Portugal, Liberia, Angola, South Africa, Brazil, and the eastern Mediterranean. It is found from depths from 0 to 1,450 m (0 to 4,757 ft) below the surface, usually at 425 to 650 m (1,394 to 2,133 ft) below the surface. During the day it is in waters from 425 to 1,000 m (1,394 to 3,281 ft) deep, and can be up to 200 m (660 ft) deep at night to feed.

== Description ==
G. cocco can reach a length of up to 6 cm (2.4 in). It has 10 to 13 dorsal soft rays, and 21 to 23 anal soft rays. Mature males have 6 to 8 supracaudal luminous structures, while mature females only have 3 to 6.

== Conservation ==
It has no threats; its distribution overlaps with several marine protected areas, and its population is stable, and is listed as Least Concern by the IUCN Red List.

== Taxonomy ==
G. cocco is one of four species in its genus. The other three are Gonichthys barnesi, Gonichthys tenuiculus, and Gonichthys venetus.
