= Cardiodectes bellottii =

Scientific classification
- Kingdom: Animalia
- Phylum: Arthropoda
- Class: Copepoda
- Order: Siphonostomatoida
- Family: Pennellidae
- Genus: Cardiodectes
- Species: C. bellottii

Binomial name
- Cardiodectes bellottii (Richiardi, 1882)

Synonyms
- Peroderma bellotti Richiardi, 1882; Lernaeenicus medusaeus C. B. Wilson, 1908; Cardiodectes medusaeus (Wilson, 1908)

Species of crustacean

Cardiodectes bellottii is a species of copepods in the family Pennellidae. It is a parasite of fish. It is found in the Atlantic and Pacific Oceans as well as the Mediterranean Sea; specimens from the Pacific were formerly treated as a separate species, Cardiodectes medusaeus.

In the cnidarian Hydrichthys sarcotretis, parasitism is taken a stage further when the hydrozoan attaches itself to the C. bellottii. This is itself an ectoparasite of the northern lampfish (Stenobrachius leucopsarus) in the family Myctophidae. The copepod attaches itself to the bulbus arteriosus of the fish. Such a parasitic chain is known as hyperparasitism. C. bellottii requires two hosts for proper development. It will go through five successive postembryonic stages, then only the post-mating females will go into the pericardial cavity of a lanternfish. The actions of the copepod castrate its fish host. Both male and female fish do not reproduce and seem to grow faster when attacked by the copepod and it seems to have a negligible energy demand from them. The hydrozoan parasite castrates the copepod, a process called hypercastration.
