= Amphinema =

Amphinema may refer to:

- Amphinema (cnidarian), a genus of jellyfishes in the family Pandeidae
- Amphinema (fungus), a genus of fungi in the family Atheliaceae
