= Hintonia =

Hintonia may refer to:

- Hintonia (fish), a lanternfish genus
- Hintonia (plant), a plant genus in the family Rubiaceae
