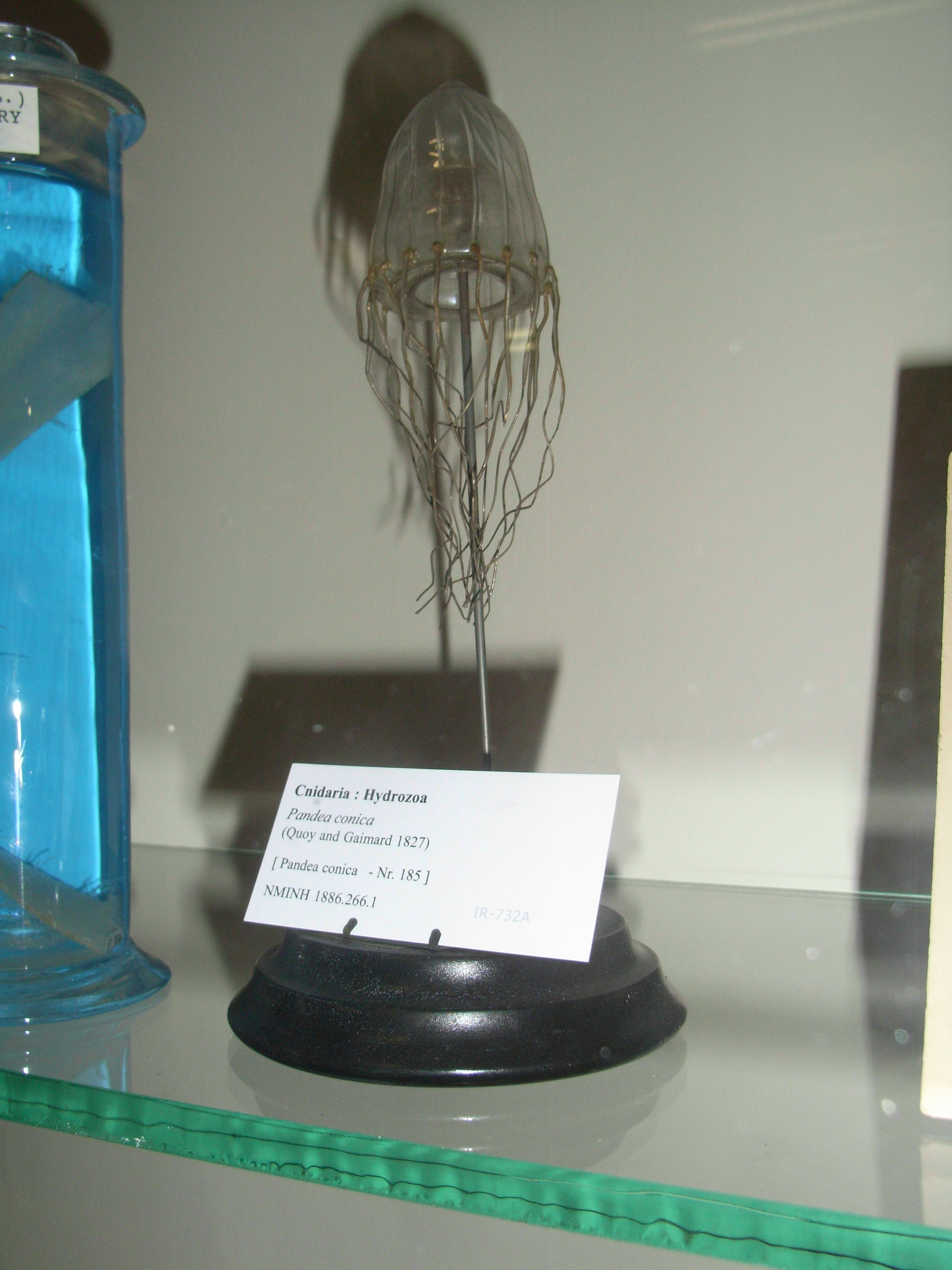

Scientific classification
- Kingdom: Animalia
- Phylum: Cnidaria
- Class: Hydrozoa
- Order: Anthoathecata
- Family: Pandeidae
- Genus: Pandea
- Species: P. conica

Binomial name
- Pandea conica (Quoy & Gaimard, 1827)

Synonyms
- Dianaea conica Quoy & Gaimard, 1827; Pandea saltatoria Lesson, 1843; Oceania sedecimacostata Kölliker, 1853; Campaniclava cleodorae (Gegenbaur, 1854); Syncoryne cleodorae Gegenbaur, 1854; Tiara pileata var. ampullacea Haeckel, 1879; Tiara reticulata Haeckel, 1879

= Pandea conica =

Species of hydrozoan

Pandea conica is a species of hydrozoan in the family Pandeidae.
