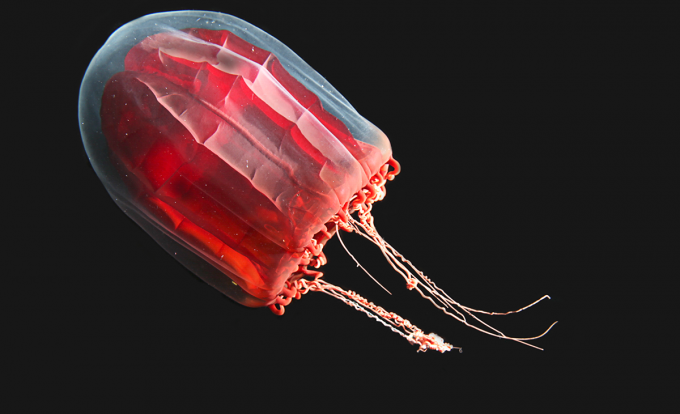

Scientific classification
- Kingdom: Animalia
- Phylum: Cnidaria
- Class: Hydrozoa
- Order: Anthoathecata
- Family: Pandeidae
- Genus: Pandea
- Species: P. rubra

Binomial name
- Pandea rubra Bigelow, 1913

= Pandea rubra =

Species of hydrozoan

Pandea rubra is a species of hydrozoans distinguished by an anthomedusan jellyfish with a bright red subumbrella. P. rubra are found in extremely deep and cold Pacific Ocean waters.

== Nomenclature ==
Red paper lantern jellyfish is a common name for this animal because of its mantle that can crumple up or expand like a paper lantern. Another reason for the name was because it was first seen on the coast of Japan and was seen as sacred.

== Anatomy ==
The red paper lantern is the most common type of P. rubra that has been recorded. This medusa has a transparent, bell-shaped hood measuring about 10 centimeters in diameter and 17 centimeters from top to bottom, with between 14 and 30 tentacles that extend up to 6 times the length of its body. Inside the transparent hood is a deep red colored mantle. JAMSTEC researcher Dr. Dhugal Lindsay is credited with naming it the paper lantern.

== Range and habitat ==
P. rubra has only been found in deep and cold ocean waters at only a few sites. So far reported from boreal to sub-boreal waters in the North Pacific and North Atlantic, and also in the Southern Ocean in Japan. They were found at depths between 450-1000m. Environmental ranges:

- Depth range (m): 0 - 2697.5
- Temperature range (°C): -1.525 - 4.636
- Nitrate (umol/L): 23.305 - 41.314
- Salinity (PPS): 33.700 - 34.685
- Oxygen (mL/L): 0.881 - 8.065
- Phosphate (umol/L): 1.415 - 3.280
- Silicate (umol/L): 13.206 - 192.813

== Behavior ==
P. rubra exhibits bioluminescence, light produced by a chemical reaction within a living organism. Bio-luminescence is a type of luminescence, which is the term for a light-producing chemical reaction. Bio-luminescence is a "cold light" in that less than 20% of the light generates heat.
