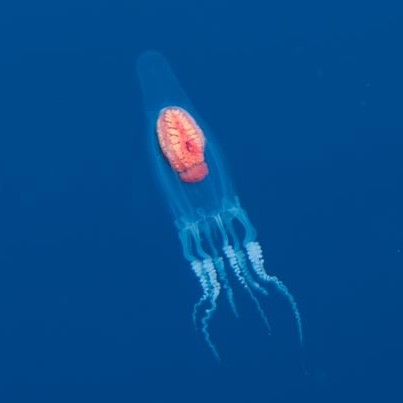

Scientific classification
- Domain: Eukaryota
- Kingdom: Animalia
- Phylum: Cnidaria
- Class: Hydrozoa
- Order: Anthoathecata
- Family: Pandeidae
- Genus: Leuckartiara; Hartlaub, 1914

= Leuckartiara =

Genus of aquatic animals

Leuckartiara is a genus of cnidarians belonging to the family Pandeidae.

The genus has a cosmopolitan distribution.

== Species ==
The following species are recognised in the genus Leuckartiara:

- Leuckartiara acuta Brinckmann-Voss, Arai & Nagasawa, 2005
- Leuckartiara adnata Pagès, Gili & Bouillon, 1992
- Leuckartiara annexa Kramp, 1957
- Leuckartiara brownei Larson & Harbison, 1990
- Leuckartiara eckerti Bouillon, 1985
- Leuckartiara foersteri Arai & Brinckmann-Voss, 1980
- Leuckartiara fujianensis Huang, Xu, Lin & Qiu, 2008
- Leuckartiara gardineri Browne, 1916
- Leuckartiara grimaldii Ranson, 1936
- Leuckartiara hoepplii Hsu, 1928
- Leuckartiara jianyinensis Xu & Huang, 2004
- Leuckartiara longicalcar Schuchert, 2018
- Leuckartiara nanhaiensis Huang, Xu & Guo, 2019
- Leuckartiara neustona Xu & Huang, 2004
- Leuckartiara nobilis Hartlaub, 1914
- Leuckartiara octona (Fleming, 1823)
- Leuckartiara octonema Xu, Huang & Guo, 2007
- Leuckartiara orientalis Xu, Huang & Chen, 1991
- Leuckartiara ruberiverruca Xu, Guo & Du, 2020
- Leuckartiara simplex Bouillon, 1980
- Leuckartiara zacae Bigelow, 1940
- Leuckartiara zhangraotingae Xu & Huang, 2006
