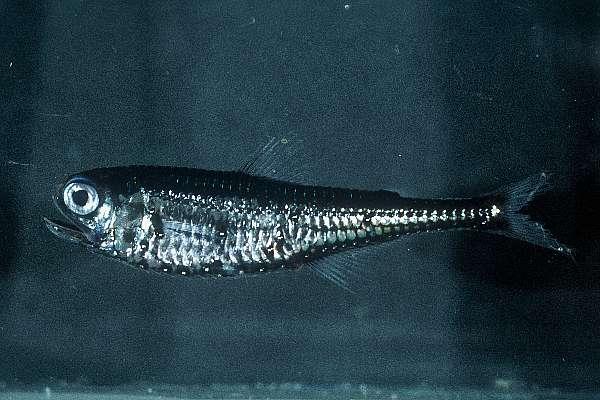

Conservation status
- Least Concern (IUCN 3.1)

Scientific classification
- Kingdom: Animalia
- Phylum: Chordata
- Class: Actinopterygii
- Order: Myctophiformes
- Family: Myctophidae
- Genus: Gonichthys
- Species: G. barnesi

Binomial name
- Gonichthys barnesi Whitley, 1943

= Gonichthys barnesi =

Species of fish

Gonichthys barnesi, or Barne's lanternfish, is a species of ray-finned fish within the family Myctophidae. It is found in subtropical waters within the southern hemisphere at depths of 425 to 1000 meters during the day, and at depths of 0 to 175 meters at night. It grows to a length of 5 centimeters.

== Taxonomy ==
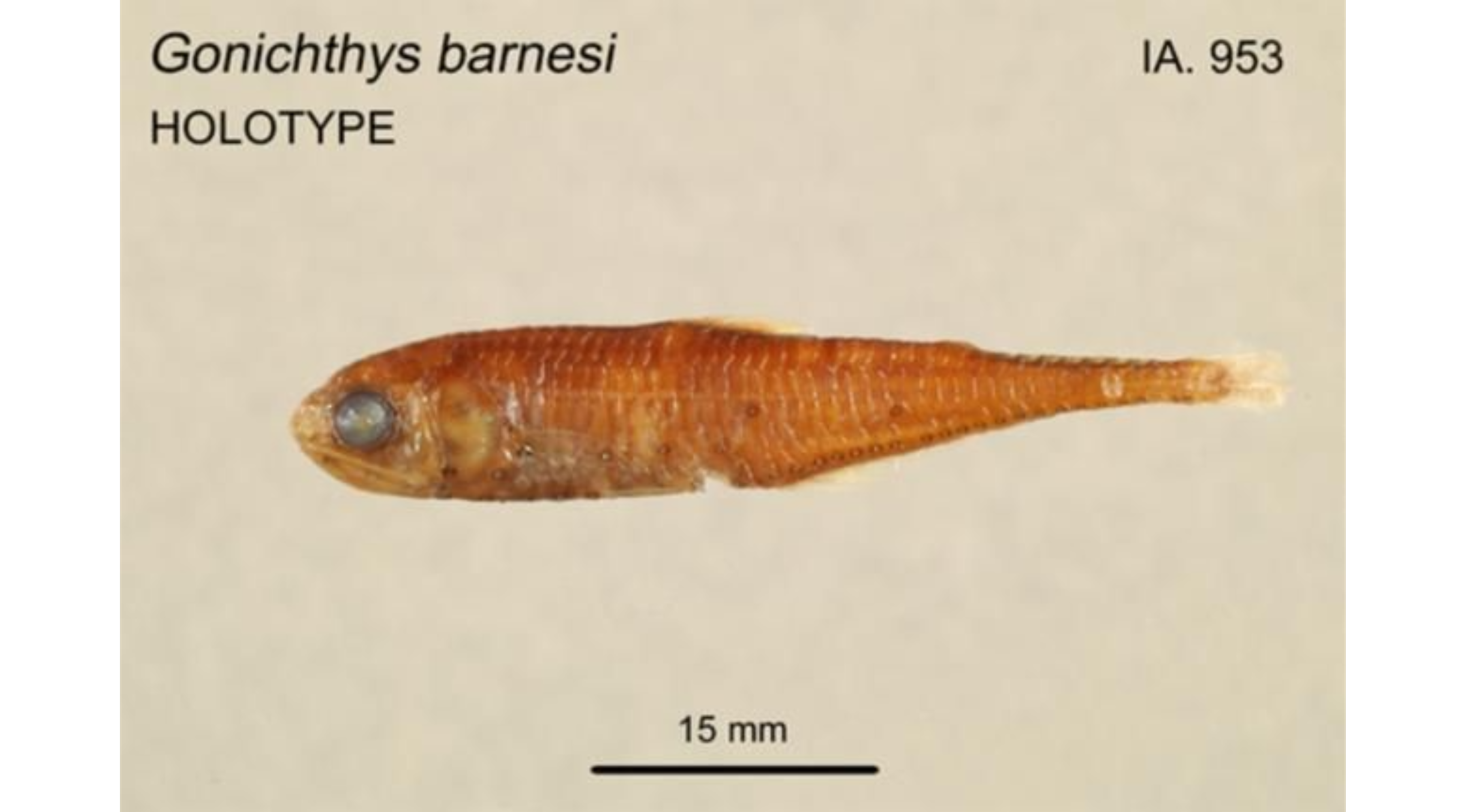
Holotype of Gonichthys barnesi.

This species was first described by Gilbert Percy Whitely in 1943.

== Conservation ==
Gonichthys barnesi has been classified as 'Least concern' by the IUCN Red list. There are no known major threats to the species, and no conservation efforts have been made so far.

== Synonymised names ==
Placed by the World Register of Marine Species.

- Gonichthys bamesi Whitley, 1943
- Myctophum coruscans Richardson, 1845
