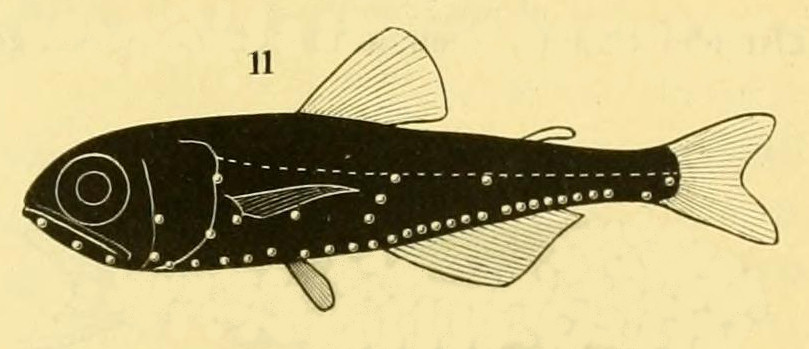

Conservation status
- Least Concern (IUCN 3.1)

Scientific classification
- Kingdom: Animalia
- Phylum: Chordata
- Class: Actinopterygii
- Order: Myctophiformes
- Family: Myctophidae
- Subfamily: Myctophinae
- Genus: Ctenoscopelus; Fraser-Brunner, 1949
- Species: C. phengodes

Binomial name
- Ctenoscopelus phengodes (Lütken, 1892)

Synonyms
- Scopelus phengodes Lütken, 1892; Ctenoscopelus phengodeus (Lütken, 1892); Myctophum phengodes (Lütken, 1892); Myctophum phengoides Lütken, 1892

= Ctenoscopelus =

Species of fish

Ctenoscopelus is a monotypic genus of lanternfish, family Myctophidae. The sole species is Ctenoscopelus phengodes, the bright lanternfish. It occurs in the Atlantic, Indian, and Pacific Oceans on the southern hemisphere. It can grow to 9.3 cm (3.7 in) standard length.
