= Parvilux =

Parvilux Temporal range: Pliocene to Present

Scientific classification
- Domain: Eukaryota
- Kingdom: Animalia
- Phylum: Chordata
- Class: Actinopterygii
- Order: Myctophiformes
- Family: Myctophidae
- Genus: Parvilux; C. L. Hubbs & Wisner, 1964

Species
- See text.

Genus of fishes

Parvilux is a genus of lanternfishes.

== Species ==
There are currently two recognized species in this genus:

- Parvilux ingens C. L. Hubbs & Wisner, 1964
- Parvilux boschmai C. L. Hubbs & Wisner, 1964 (Giant lampfish)
