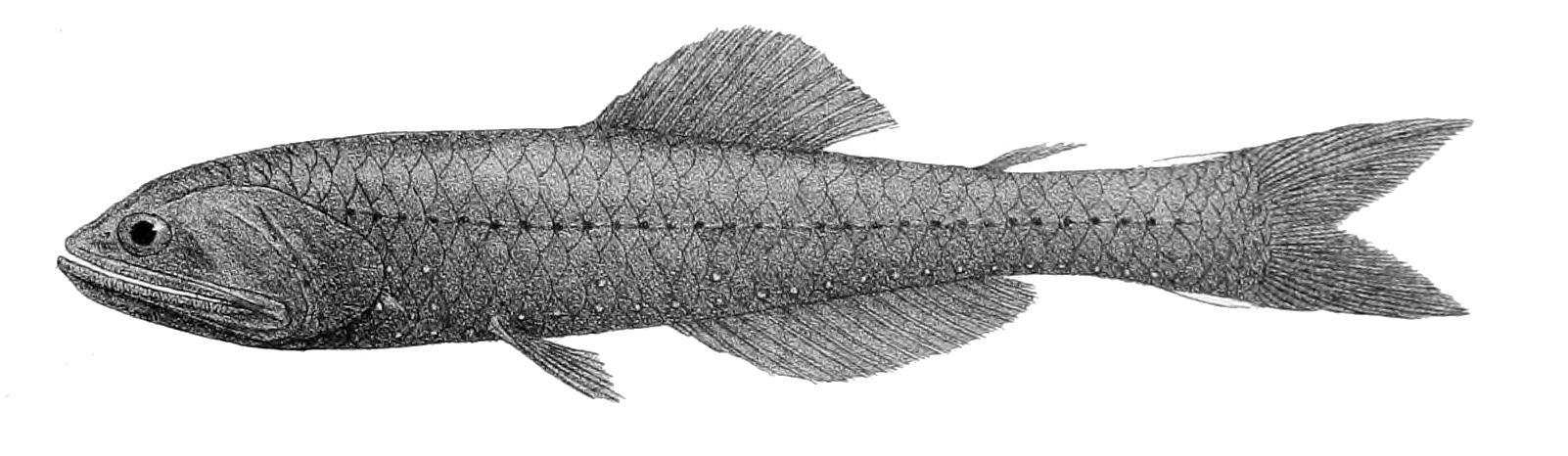
- Black Lanternfish (N. nigrum)

Scientific classification
- Domain: Eukaryota
- Kingdom: Animalia
- Phylum: Chordata
- Class: Actinopterygii
- Order: Myctophiformes
- Family: Myctophidae
- Genus: Nannobrachium; Günther, 1887

= Nannobrachium =

Genus of fishes

Nannobrachium is a genus of lanternfishes.

== Species ==
There are currently 17 recognized species in this genus:

- Nannobrachium achirus (Andriashev, 1962) (Lantern fish)
- Nannobrachium atrum (Tåning, 1928) (Dusky lanternfish)
- Nannobrachium bristori Zahuranic, 2000
- Nannobrachium crypticum Zahuranic, 2000
- Nannobrachium cuprarium (Tåning, 1928)
- Nannobrachium fernae (Wisner, 1971)
- Nannobrachium gibbsi Zahuranic, 2000
- Nannobrachium hawaiiensis Zahuranic, 2000
- Nannobrachium idostigma (A. E. Parr, 1931)
- Nannobrachium indicum Zahuranic, 2000
- Nannobrachium isaacsi (Wisner, 1974)
- Nannobrachium lineatum (Tåning, 1928)
- Nannobrachium nigrum Günther, 1887 (Black lantern fish)
- Nannobrachium phyllisae Zahuranic, 2000
- Nannobrachium regale (C. H. Gilbert, 1892) (Pinpoint lampfish)
- Nannobrachium ritteri (C. H. Gilbert, 1915) (Broadfin lampfish)
- Nannobrachium wisneri Zahuranic, 2000
