= Lampichthys =

Scientific classification
- Domain: Eukaryota
- Kingdom: Animalia
- Phylum: Chordata
- Class: Actinopterygii
- Order: Myctophiformes
- Family: Myctophidae
- Genus: Lampichthys; Fraser-Brunner, 1949
- Species: L. procerus

Binomial name
- Lampichthys procerus (A. B. Brauer, 1904)

Genus of fishes

Lampichthys procerus, the blackhead lanternfish, is a species of lanternfish found circumglobally in the southern oceans. This fish grows to a length of 10.0 centimetres (3.9 in) TL.
