= Notolychnus =

Conservation status
- Least Concern (IUCN 3.1)

Scientific classification
- Domain: Eukaryota
- Kingdom: Animalia
- Phylum: Chordata
- Class: Actinopterygii
- Order: Myctophiformes
- Family: Myctophidae
- Genus: Notolychnus; Fraser-Brunner, 1949
- Species: N. valdiviae

Binomial name
- Notolychnus valdiviae (A. B. Brauer, 1904)

Genus of fishes

Notolychnus valdiviae, the topside lanternfish, is a species of lanternfish found in the oceans worldwide. This species grows to a length of 6.3 centimetres (2.5 in) TL.
