= Stenobrachius =

Scientific classification
- Domain: Eukaryota
- Kingdom: Animalia
- Phylum: Chordata
- Class: Actinopterygii
- Order: Myctophiformes
- Family: Myctophidae
- Genus: Stenobrachius; C. H. Eigenmann & R. S. Eigenmann, 1890

Genus of fishes

Stenobrachius is a genus of lanternfishes.

== Species ==
There are currently two extant and three extinct Early to Middle Miocene species recognized in this genus:

- Stenobrachius leucopsarus (C. H. Eigenmann & R. S. Eigenmann, 1890) (Northern lampfish)
- Stenobrachius nannochir (C. H. Gilbert, 1890) (Garnet lanternfish)
- †Stenobrachius salnikovi (Nazarkin & Nesov, 1995)
- †Stenobrachius sangsunii (Nam & Nazarkin, 2022)
- †Stenobrachius ohashii (Schwarzhans et al., 2022)
