= Halitholus =

Scientific classification
- Domain: Eukaryota
- Kingdom: Animalia
- Phylum: Cnidaria
- Class: Hydrozoa
- Order: Anthoathecata
- Family: Pandeidae
- Genus: Halitholus; Hartlaub, 1914

Genus of hydrozoans

Halitholus is a genus of cnidarians belonging to the family Pandeidae.

The genus is aquatic and has almost cosmopolitan distribution.

Accepted Species:

- Halitholus cirratus (Hartlaub, 1914)
- Halitholus intermedius (Browne, 1902)
- Halitholus pauper (Hartlaub, 1914)
- Halitholus triangulus (Xu, Huang & Guo, 2014)

Unaccepted/ Debated Species:

- Halitholus intermeda
- Halitholus yoldiaarcticae
- Halitholus yoldiaearcticae
