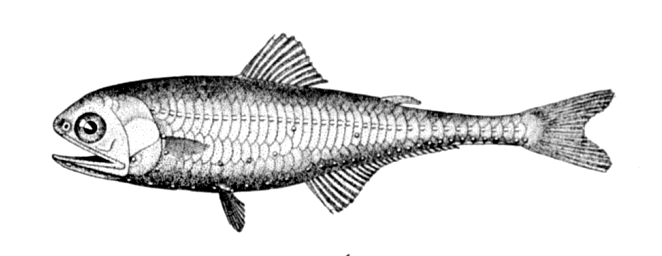
- G. cocco

Scientific classification
- Domain: Eukaryota
- Kingdom: Animalia
- Phylum: Chordata
- Class: Actinopterygii
- Order: Myctophiformes
- Family: Myctophidae
- Genus: Gonichthys; Gistel, 1850

= Gonichthys =

Genus of fishes

Gonichthys is a genus of lanternfishes.

== Species ==
There are four recognized species in this genus:

- Gonichthys barnesi Whitley, 1943 (Barnes's lanternfish)
- Gonichthys cocco (Cocco, 1829)
- Gonichthys tenuiculus (Garman, 1899) (slendertail lanternfish)
- Gonichthys venetus Becker, 1964
