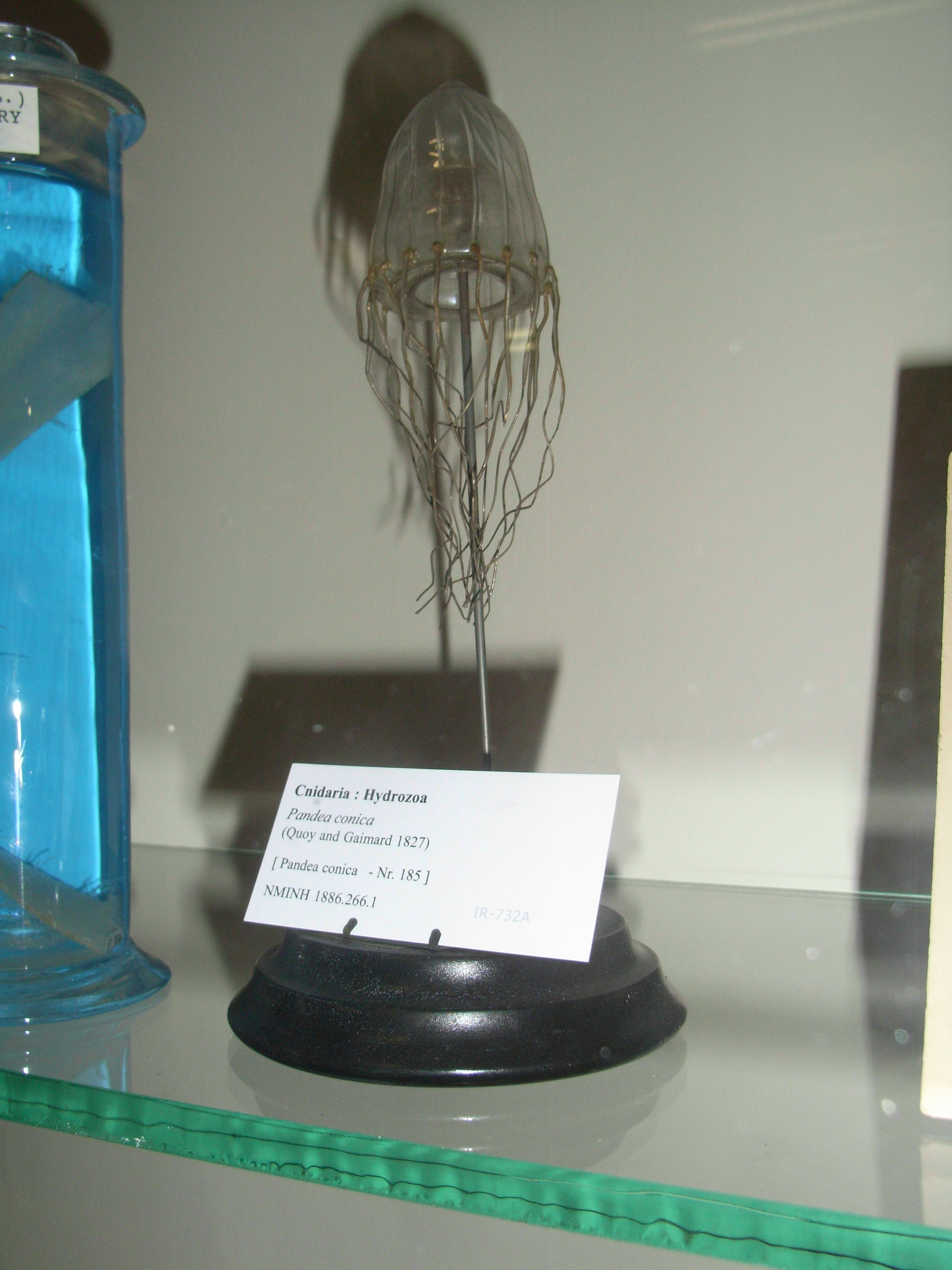

Scientific classification
- Kingdom: Animalia
- Phylum: Cnidaria
- Class: Hydrozoa
- Order: Anthoathecata
- Family: Pandeidae
- Genus: Pandea; Lesson, 1843

Species
- See text

= Pandea (cnidarian) =

Genus of hydrozoans

Pandea is a genus of hydrozoans of the family Pandeidae.

== Species ==
The World Register of Marine Species recognises the following species:

- Pandea clionis (Vanhöffen, 1910)
- Pandea conica (Quoy & Gaimard, 1827)
- Pandea cybeles Alvariño, 1988
- Pandea rubra Bigelow, 1913

=== Invalid species ===
- Pandea minima von Lendenfeld, 1885 [taxon inquirendum]
