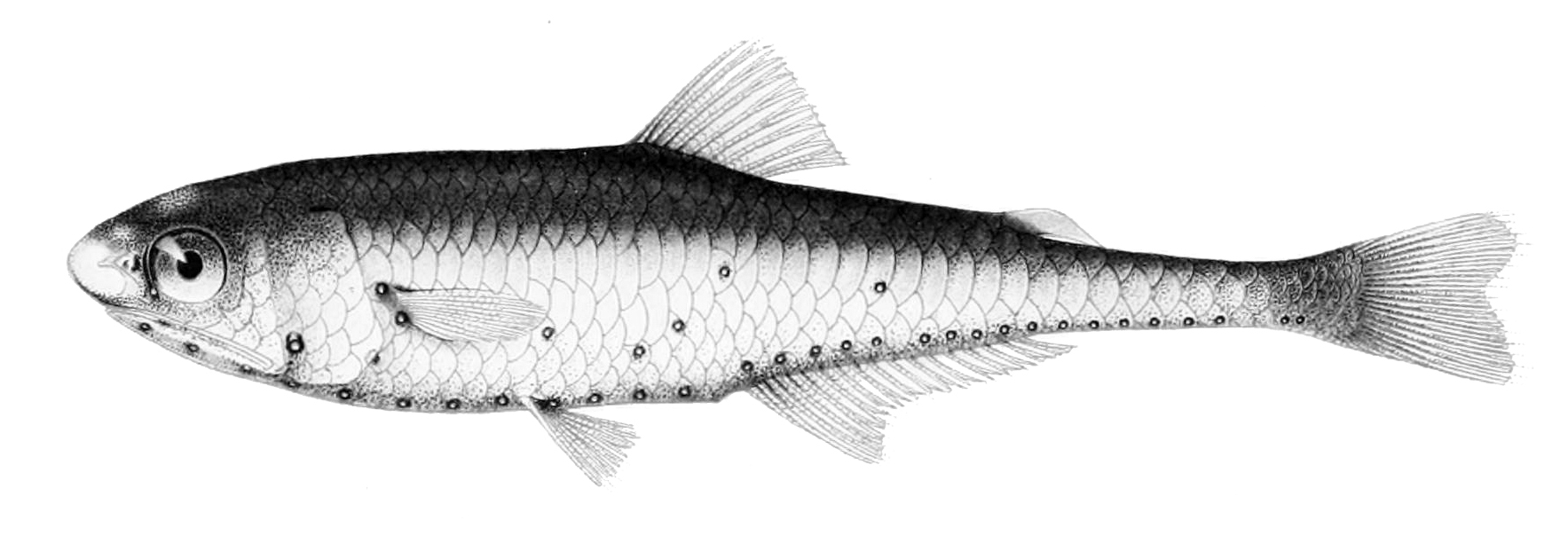
- C. choerocephalus]

Scientific classification
- Domain: Eukaryota
- Kingdom: Animalia
- Phylum: Chordata
- Class: Actinopterygii
- Order: Myctophiformes
- Family: Myctophidae
- Genus: Centrobranchus; Fowler, 1904

= Centrobranchus =

Genus of fishes

Centrobranchus is a genus of lanternfishes.

== Species ==
The currently recognized species in this genus are:

- Centrobranchus andreae (Lütken, 1892) (Andre's lanternfish)
- Centrobranchus brevirostris Becker, 1964
- Centrobranchus choerocephalus Fowler, 1904
- Centrobranchus nigroocellatus (Günther, 1873) (roundnose lanternfish)
