= Scopelopsis =

Scientific classification
- Kingdom: Animalia
- Phylum: Chordata
- Class: Actinopterygii
- Order: Myctophiformes
- Family: Myctophidae
- Genus: Scopelopsis; A. B. Brauer, 1906
- Species: S. multipunctatus

Binomial name
- Scopelopsis multipunctatus A. B. Brauer, 1906 Brauer. "scopelopsis multipunctatus". fishbase.

Species of fish

Scopelopsis multipunctatus, the multispotted lanternfish, is a species of lanternfish. This species grows to a length of 9.5 cm (3.7 in).

== Description ==
Scopelopsis multipunctatus has round eyes, a long and slender body, and a forked homocercal caudal fin.

=== Larvae ===
Scopelopsis multipunctatus' larvae are slender and range in size anywhere from 5–18 mm (0.2-0.7 in), with its head spanning about a quarter of the body length. Their eyes are large at younger stages and decrease in size relative to their head over time.

They develop a pattern of melanophores along the ventral side of the body, as well as the head, dorsal fin, and caudal fin, as they mature. Photophores also develop along the ventral half of the body during the larval stages of the multispotted lanternfish.

== Distribution and habitat ==
Scopelopsis multipunctatus follow a subtropical zoogeographic pattern. Its distribution is restricted to the Southern Hemisphere, ranging from 15 to 25° S in the Pacific Ocean and 23-29° S in the Indian Ocean.

They can be found in both warm and cold waters of the ocean.

== Diet ==
The diet of Scopelopsis multipunctatus consists of copepods; amphipods and euphausiids; larval molluscs, ostracods, polychaetes, and siphonophores; and salps.
