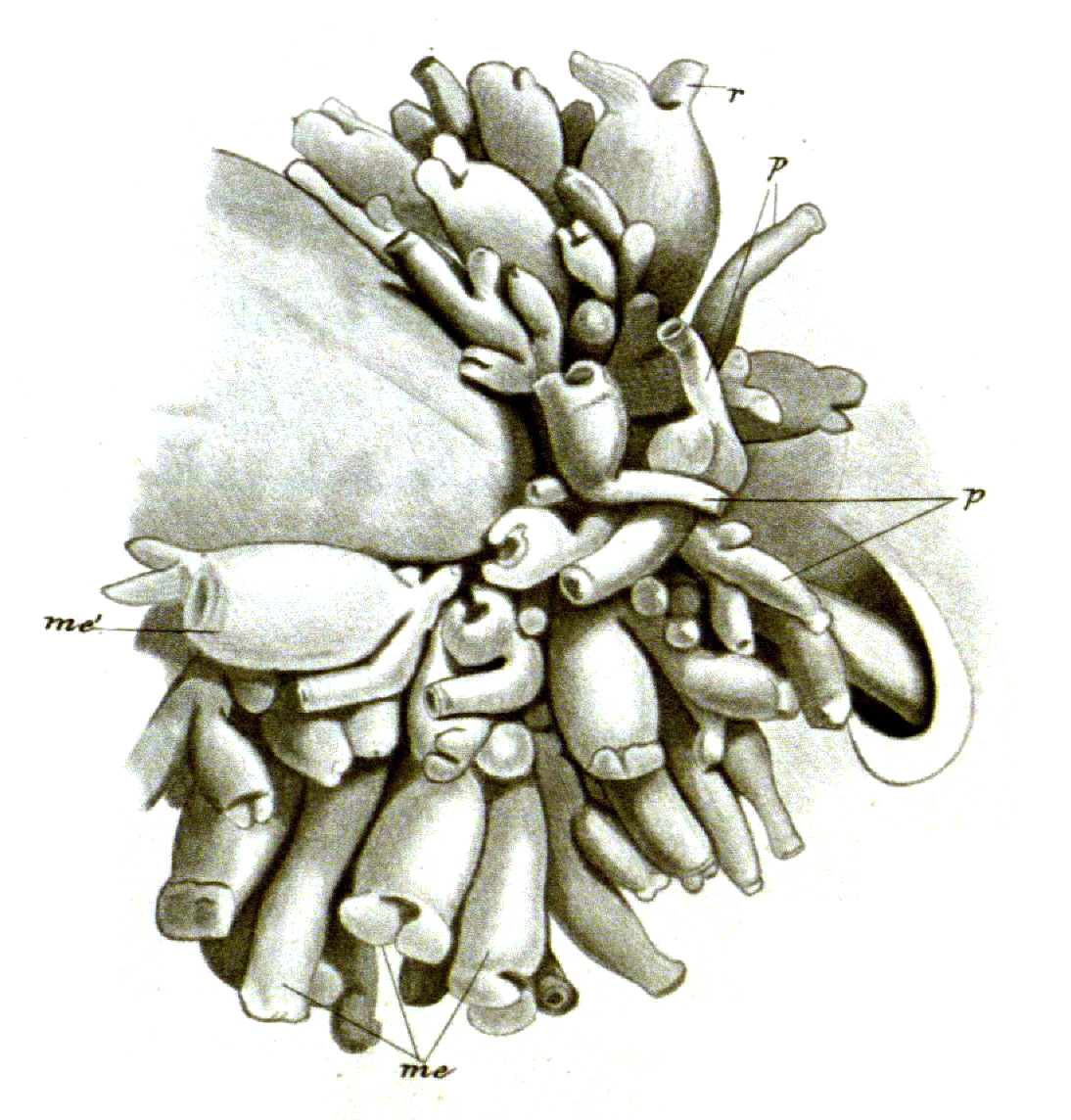
- A colony of Hydrichthys sarcotretis attached to parasitic copepod Cardiodectes medusaeus

Scientific classification
- Kingdom: Animalia
- Phylum: Arthropoda
- Clade: Pancrustacea
- Class: Copepoda
- Order: Siphonostomatoida
- Family: Pennellidae
- Genus: Cardiodectes; C. B. Wilson, 1917

Species
- 15 species (see text)

= Cardiodectes =

Genus of crustaceans

Cardiodectes is a genus of copepods in the family Pennellidae. Species are parasites of fish.

== Species ==
Species:

- Cardiodectes anchorellae Brian & Gray, 1928
- Cardiodectes asper Uyeno & Nagasawa, 2010
- Cardiodectes bellottii (Richiardi, 1882)
- Cardiodectes bellwoodi Uyeno, 2013
- Cardiodectes bertrandi Uyeno & Nagasawa, 2010
- Cardiodectes boxshalli Bellwood, 1981
- Cardiodectes cristatus Shiino, 1958
- Cardiodectes frondosus Schuurmans Stekhoven J.H. Jr, 1937
- Cardiodectes hardenbergi Markevich, 1936
- Cardiodectes krishnai Sebastian, 1968
- Cardiodectes longicervicus Shiino, 1958
- Cardiodectes rotundicaudatus Izawa, 1970
- Cardiodectes rubosus Leigh-Sharpe, 1934
- Cardiodectes shini Uyeno, 2013
- Cardiodectes spiralis Bellwood, 1981
- Cardiodectes tofaili Lim et al., 2025

Cardiodectes medusaeus (Wilson C.B., 1908) is a synonym of Cardiodectes bellottii.
