= Gonichthys venetus =

Conservation status
- Least Concern (IUCN 3.1)

Scientific classification
- Kingdom: Animalia
- Phylum: Chordata
- Class: Actinopterygii
- Order: Myctophiformes
- Family: Myctophidae
- Genus: Gonichthys
- Species: G. venetus

Binomial name
- Gonichthys venetus Becker, 1964

Species of fish

Gonichthys venetus is a species of ray-finned fish within the family Myctophidae. The species is found distributed in the southeastern Pacific Ocean off New Caledonia, French Polynesia to the Galápagos Islands, and central Chile. It lives at depths up to 1,310 metres (4,300 ft), however most populations are found shallower than 1,000 metres (3,280 ft). Adults reach up to 4 centimetres (1.6 in) in lengths.

The species has been assessed as 'Least concern' by the IUCN Red List as it has a large distribution with no known major threats.
