= Triphoturus =

- Triphoturus mexicanus collected off the coast of San Diego, California in 2026

Scientific classification
- Kingdom: Animalia
- Phylum: Chordata
- Class: Actinopterygii
- Order: Myctophiformes
- Family: Myctophidae
- Genus: Triphoturus; Fraser-Brunner, 1949

Genus of fishes

Triphoturus is a genus of lanternfishes.

== Species ==
There are currently three recognized species in this genus:

- Triphoturus mexicanus (C. H. Gilbert, 1890) (Mexican lampfish)
- Triphoturus nigrescens (A. B. Brauer, 1904) (Highseas lampfish)
- Triphoturus oculeum (Garman, 1899)
