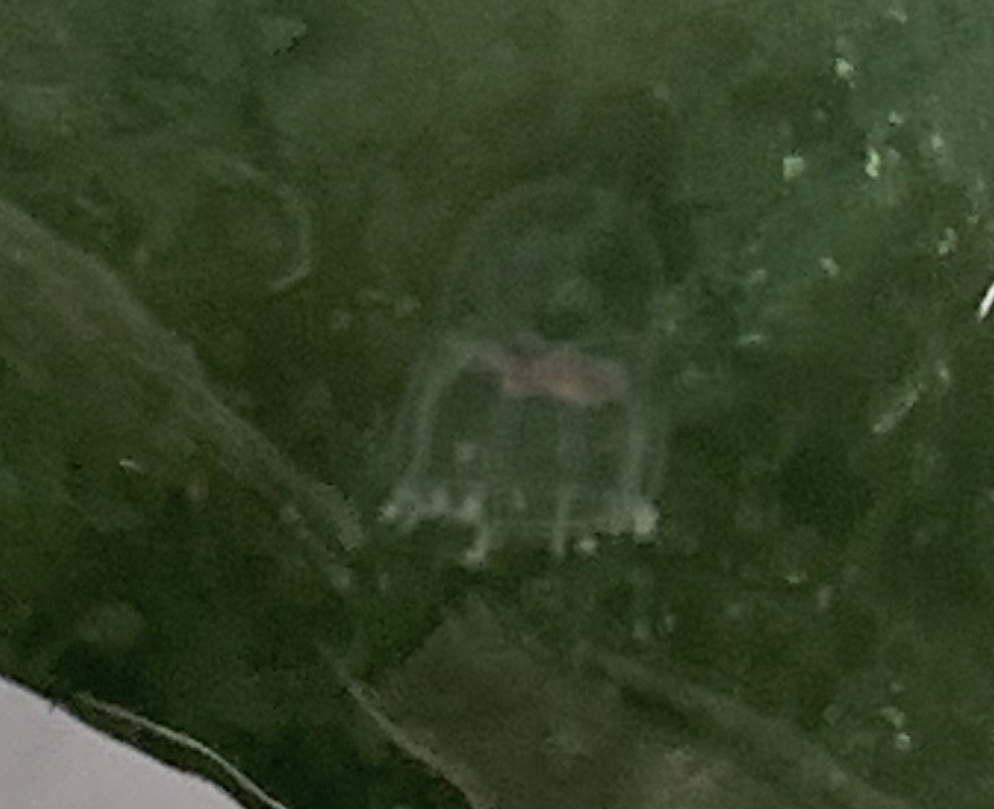
- Catablema vesicarium

Scientific classification
- Domain: Eukaryota
- Kingdom: Animalia
- Phylum: Cnidaria
- Class: Hydrozoa
- Order: Anthoathecata
- Family: Pandeidae
- Genus: Catablema; Haeckel, 1879

= Catablema =

Genus of aquatic animals

Catablema is a genus of cnidarians belonging to the family Pandeidae.

The species of this genus are found in subarctic regions.

== Species ==
There are two species recognised in the genus Catablema with a third identified by DNA barcoding:

- Catablema multicirratum Kishinouye, 1910
- Catablema vesicarium (Agassiz, 1862)
- BOLD:AAP1206 (Catablema sp.)
