= Hintonia candens =

Scientific classification
- Domain: Eukaryota
- Kingdom: Animalia
- Phylum: Chordata
- Class: Actinopterygii
- Order: Myctophiformes
- Family: Myctophidae
- Genus: Hintonia; Fraser-Brunner, 1949
- Species: H. candens

Binomial name
- Hintonia candens Fraser-Brunner, 1949

Species of fish

Hintonia candens is a species of lanternfish found circumglobally in the southern oceans. This species grows to a length of 13 centimetres (5.1 in) SL. This species is the only known member of its genus Hintonia.
