= Northern lampfish =

Scientific classification
- Kingdom: Animalia
- Phylum: Chordata
- Class: Actinopterygii
- Order: Myctophiformes
- Family: Myctophidae
- Genus: Stenobrachius
- Species: S. leucopsarus

Binomial name
- Stenobrachius leucopsarus C. H. Eigenmann & Eigenmann, 1890

Species of fish

The northern lampfish (Stenobrachius leucopsarus), also known as smallfin lanternfish, is a small oceanic fish in the family Myctophidae. First described by husband and wife ichthyologists Carl H. and Rosa Smith Eigenmann in 1890, it is named for the numerous small round photophores that line the ventral surface of its head and body.

== Description ==
S. Leucopsarus are a blunt-nosed, relatively large-mouthed fish with small teeth and large eyes,. Their mouths have well-developed premaxillary, palatine, pterygoid and dentary teeth, as well as well-developed pharyngeal teeth and toothed gill rakers. S. Leucopsarus have gray to dark greenish blue pigmentation on its dorsal surface and are paler ventrally, with black on its fins and operculum. They also have gut melanophores with lateral spots at the pectoral fin base, midgut, and anus. Their fins consist of a dorsal fin near the midbody, an adipose fin, abdominal pelvic fins, and an anal fin below the dorsal fin. It has large scales that rub off easily. Adults can reach 13 centimeters (5 in) in length.

S. Leucopsarus appears similar to the Diphus theta but can be distinguished from them due to their lack of pigmentation at the caudal base and the number of postanal ventral melanophores present in both the larval and adult form.

== Taxonomy ==
S. Leucopsarus are members of the Myctophidae family, which are commonly referred to as Lanternfish. Myctophids are among the most abundant midwater fish, making up 60% of all deep sea biomass. This family of fish are defined by their blunted mouths, large eyes, and the presence of photophores along their head and the ventral surface of their body.

== Life History ==
S. Leucopsarus has an average lifespan of five years, but some individuals have lived up to eight. They reach sexual maturity around the age of four. Spawning season for the larvae is between the months of December through March, with the highest number of larvae being measured in January. Like most fish, it is oviparous

== Distribution ==
Found in the Pacific Ocean from Japan and Baja California to the Bering Sea, it is the most common species of lanternfish in the northwestern Pacific, and one of the most abundant larval fish in the California Current. Like all lanternfish, this is a deep sea species; it spends the day in the ocean's deeper bathypelagic and mesopelagic zones and ascends to or near the ocean's surface during the night. It is a cool-water fish.

The S. Leucopsarus are the most abundant of the myctophids, having an estimated biomass of 21 million tonnes in the Subarctic Pacific. The species is most abundantly found in the Bering Sea

== Migration Pattern ==
S. Leucopsarus are made up of both migratory and nonmigratory individuals. Migratory individuals migrate at night from the mesopelagic depths to the near surface layers of the Bering Sea in order to feed. The migratory individuals were found in the upper 50m of Ocean off Oregon, 60m in the southern Bering Sea, and as shallow as 20m. Nonmigratory S. Leucopsarus remains in deep waters during all parts of the day.

== Diet ==
S. Leucopsarus diet primarily consists of ostracods, E.pacifica, and a variety of large copepods. They have also been found to eat fish eggs, zoea, amphipods, and smaller copepods in smaller quantities. Migratory and nonmigratory populations feed both during the daytime and the nighttime, but migratory populations are reported to have fuller stomachs at night than their nonmigratory counterparts. They are eaten by numerous predators, including fish such as salmon and tuna and birds such as the red-legged kittiwake.

== Conservation Status ==
Although myctophids are one of the most abundant groups of teleost, they are predicted to face distributional changes as a result of climate change. It is theorized that the lanternfish will migrate towards cooler climates as temperatures rise, which will negatively impact the trophic levels of the surrounding environment. Even though lanternfish are abundant and currently not endangered, they are still impacted by human pollution. Multiple studies have found plastic pieces in the stomachs of lanternfish, which negatively impacts digestion of the individuals, as well as contributing to the bio-accumulation of plastic in the ecosystem.
