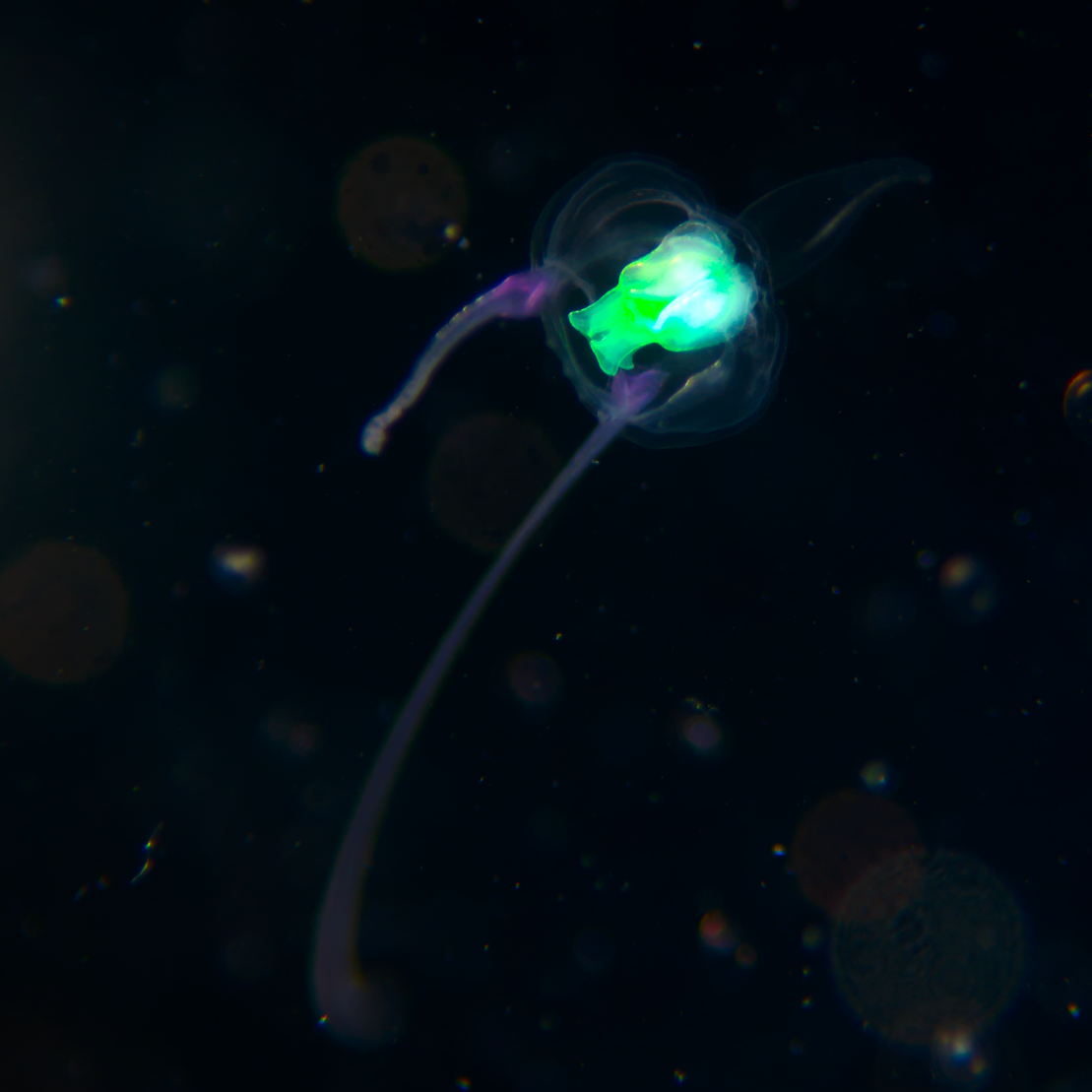
- Amphinema dinema

Scientific classification
- Kingdom: Animalia
- Phylum: Cnidaria
- Class: Hydrozoa
- Order: Anthoathecata
- Family: Pandeidae
- Genus: Amphinema; Haeckel, 1879

= Amphinema (cnidarian) =

Genus of hydrozoans

Amphinema is a genus of cnidarians belonging to the family Pandeidae.

The genus has a cosmopolitan distribution.

== Species ==
The following species are recognised in the genus Amphinema:

- Amphinema biscayana (Browne, 1907)
- Amphinema bouilloni Schuchert, 2007
- Amphinema calcariformis (Xu, Huang & Guo, 2009)
- Amphinema cheshirei Gershwin & Zeidler, 2003
- Amphinema dinema (Péron & Lesueur, 1810)
- Amphinema globogona Xu, Huang & Guo, 2008
- Amphinema gordini Fuentes, Gili & Lindsay, 2012
- Amphinema krampi Russell, 1956
- Amphinema modernisme Bouillon, Gili, Pages & Isla, 2000
- Amphinema nanhainensis (Xu, Huang & Gua, 2008)
- Amphinema physophorum (Uchida, 1927)
- Amphinema platyhedos Arai & Brinckmann-Voss, 1983
- Amphinema rollinsi Widmer, 2007
- Amphinema rubrum (Kramp, 1957)
- Amphinema rugosum (Mayer, 1900)
- Amphinema tsingtauensis Kao, Li & Chang, 1958
- Amphinema turrida (Mayer, 1900)
