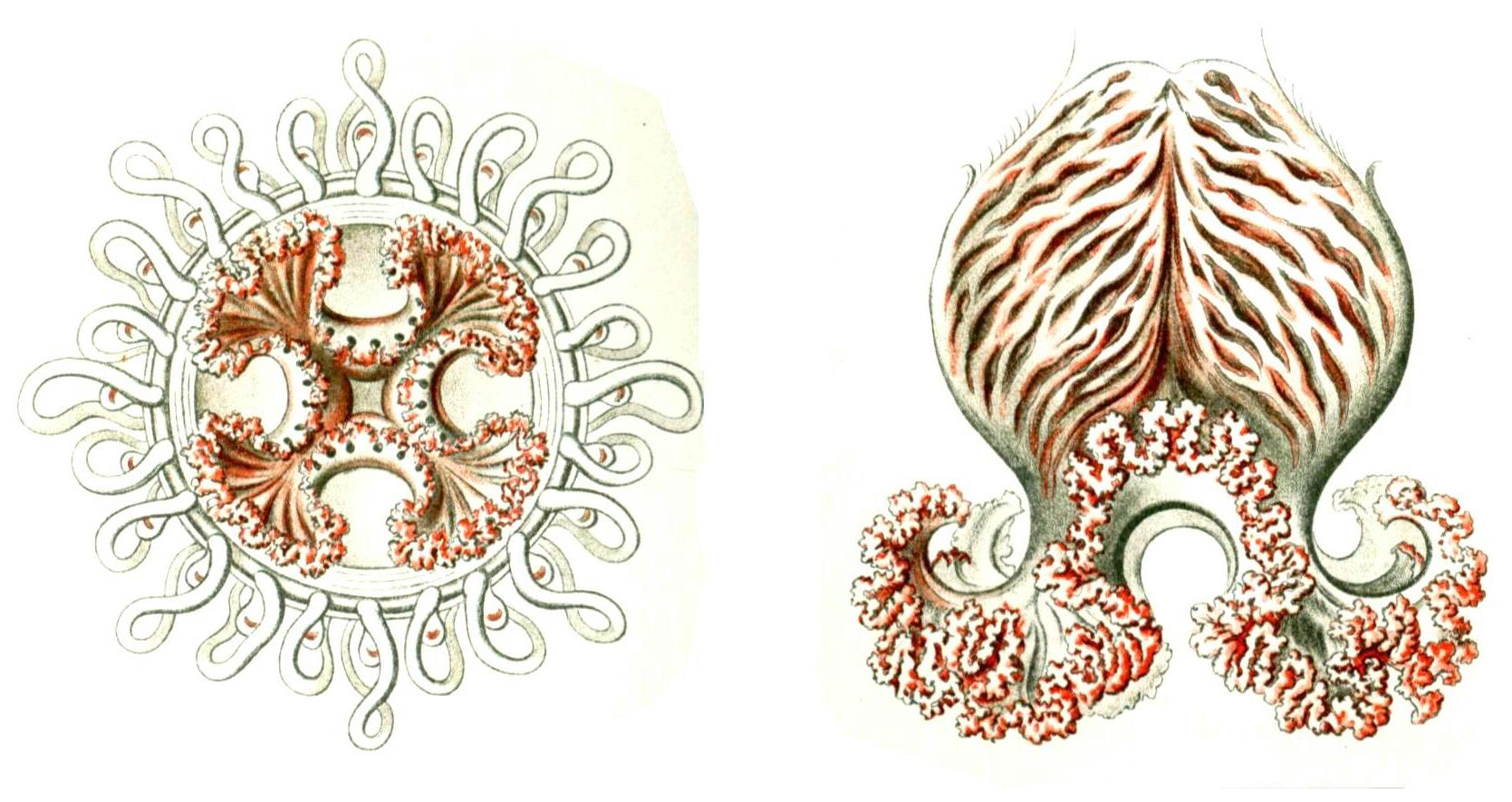
- Neoturris pileata from below (left), cross section (right)

Scientific classification
- Kingdom: Animalia
- Phylum: Cnidaria
- Class: Hydrozoa
- Order: Anthoathecata
- Suborder: Filifera
- Family: Pandeidae; Haeckel, 1879

Genera
- See text

Synonyms
- Hydrichthyidae; Pandeiidae (lapsus)

= Pandeidae =

Family of hydrozoans

Pandeidae is a family of hydroids in the class Hydrozoa. Like other jellyfish there is usually a mature medusa form which is pelagic and reproduces sexually and a hydroid or polyp form which is often benthic and reproduces asexually by budding.

== Characteristics ==
Members of this family have bell-shaped medusae with a four-part manubrium or sub-umbrella, a mouth with four plain or pleated lips and four, often broad, radial canals. The gonads are smooth or folded and positioned on the walls of the manubrium and sometimes extend onto the radial canals. There are fine, hollow tentacles along the margin of the bell, mostly growing from small carrot-shaped bulbs. The hydroids have threadlike tentacles.

== Genera ==
The World Register of Marine Species recognises the following genera:

- Amphinema Haeckel, 1879
- Annatiara Russell, 1940
- Barnettia Schuchert, 1996
- Catablema Haeckel, 1879
- Cirrhitiara Hartlaub, 1914
- Eutiara Bigelow, 1918
- Geomackiea Mills, 1985
- Halitholus Hartlaub, 1913
- Hydrichthys Fewkes, 1887
- Larsonia Boero, Bouillon & Gravili, 1991
- Leuckartiara Hartlaub, 1914
- Merga Hartlaub, 1914
- Neoturris Hartlaub, 1914
- Nudiclava Lloyd, 1907
- Octotiara Kramp, 1953
- Pandea Lesson, 1843
- Pandeopsis Kramp, 1959
- Pelagiana Borstad & Brinckmann-Voss, 1979
- Perigonella Stechow, 1921
- Stomotoca L. Agassiz, 1862
- Timoides Bigelow, 1904
- Zanclonia Hartlaub, 1914
