= Bulbus arteriosus =

Part of the circulatory system of fish

In the circulatory system of fishes, the bulbus arteriosus is a pear shaped chamber that functions as a capacitor, maintaining continuous blood flow into the gill arches.
