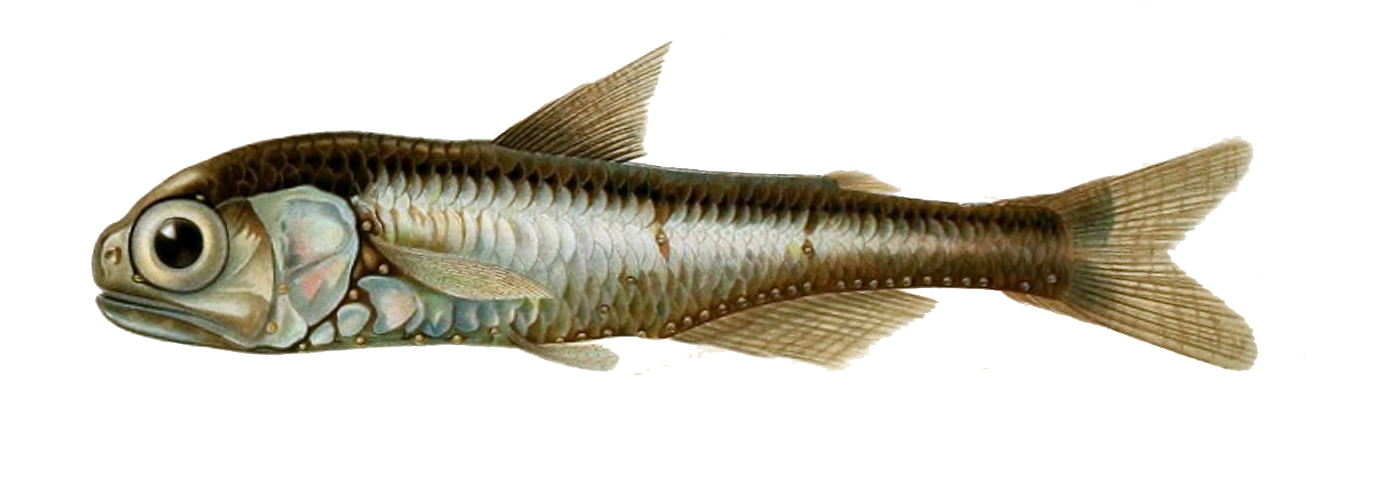
- Myctophum punctatum

Scientific classification
- Kingdom: Animalia
- Phylum: Chordata
- Class: Actinopterygii
- Division: Teleostei
- Order: Myctophiformes
- Family: Myctophidae; T. N. Gill, 1893

Genera
- See text

= Lanternfish =

Lanternfish Temporal range: Late Cretaceous (Santonian) to present

Family of ray-finned fishes

Lanternfish (or myctophids, from the Greek μυκτήρ myktḗr, "nose" and ophis, "serpent") are small mesopelagic fish of the large family Myctophidae. One of two families in the order Myctophiformes, the Myctophidae are represented by 246 species in 33 genera, and are found in oceans worldwide. They are named after their conspicuous use of bioluminescence. Their sister family, the Neoscopelidae, are much fewer in number but superficially very similar; at least one neoscopelid shares the common name "lanternfish": the large-scaled lantern fish, Neoscopelus macrolepidotus.

Lanternfish are among the most widely distributed, diverse and populous vertebrates, with some estimates suggesting that they may have a total global biomass of 1.8 to 16 gigatonnes, accounting for up to 65% of all deep-sea fish biomass. Commercial fisheries for them exist off South Africa, in the sub-Antarctic, and in the Gulf of Oman.

The earliest known fossil lanternfish is †Garganomyctophum from the Santonian of Italy.

== Description ==
Lanternfish typically have a slender, compressed body covered in small, silvery deciduous cycloid scales (ctenoid in four species), a large bluntly rounded head, large elliptical to round lateral eyes (dorsolateral in Protomyctophum species), and a large terminal mouth with jaws closely set with rows of small teeth. The fins are generally small, with a single high dorsal fin, a forked caudal fin, and an adipose fin. The anal fin is supported by a cartilaginous plate at its base, and originates under, or slightly behind, the rear part of the dorsal fin. The pectoral fins, usually with eight rays, may be large and well-developed to small and degenerate, or completely absent in a few species. In some species, such as those of the genus Lampanyctus, the pectorals are greatly elongated. Most lanternfish have a gas bladder, but it degenerates or fills with lipids during the maturation of a few species. The lateral line is uninterrupted.

In all but one species, Taaningichthys paurolychnus, a number of photophores (light-producing organs) are present; these are paired and concentrated in ventrolateral rows on the body and head. Some may also possess specialised photophores on the caudal peduncle, in proximity to the eyes (e.g., the "headlights" of Diaphus species), and luminous patches at the base of the fins. The photophores emit a weak blue, green, or yellow light, and are known to be arranged in species-specific patterns. In some species, the pattern varies between males and females. This is true for the luminous caudal patches, with the males' being typically above the tail and the females' being below the tail.

Lanternfish are generally small fish, ranging from about 2 to 30 cm (0.79 to 11.81 in) in length, with most being under 15 cm (5.9 in). Shallow-living species are an iridescent blue to green or silver, while deeper-living species are dark brown to black.

== Ecology ==
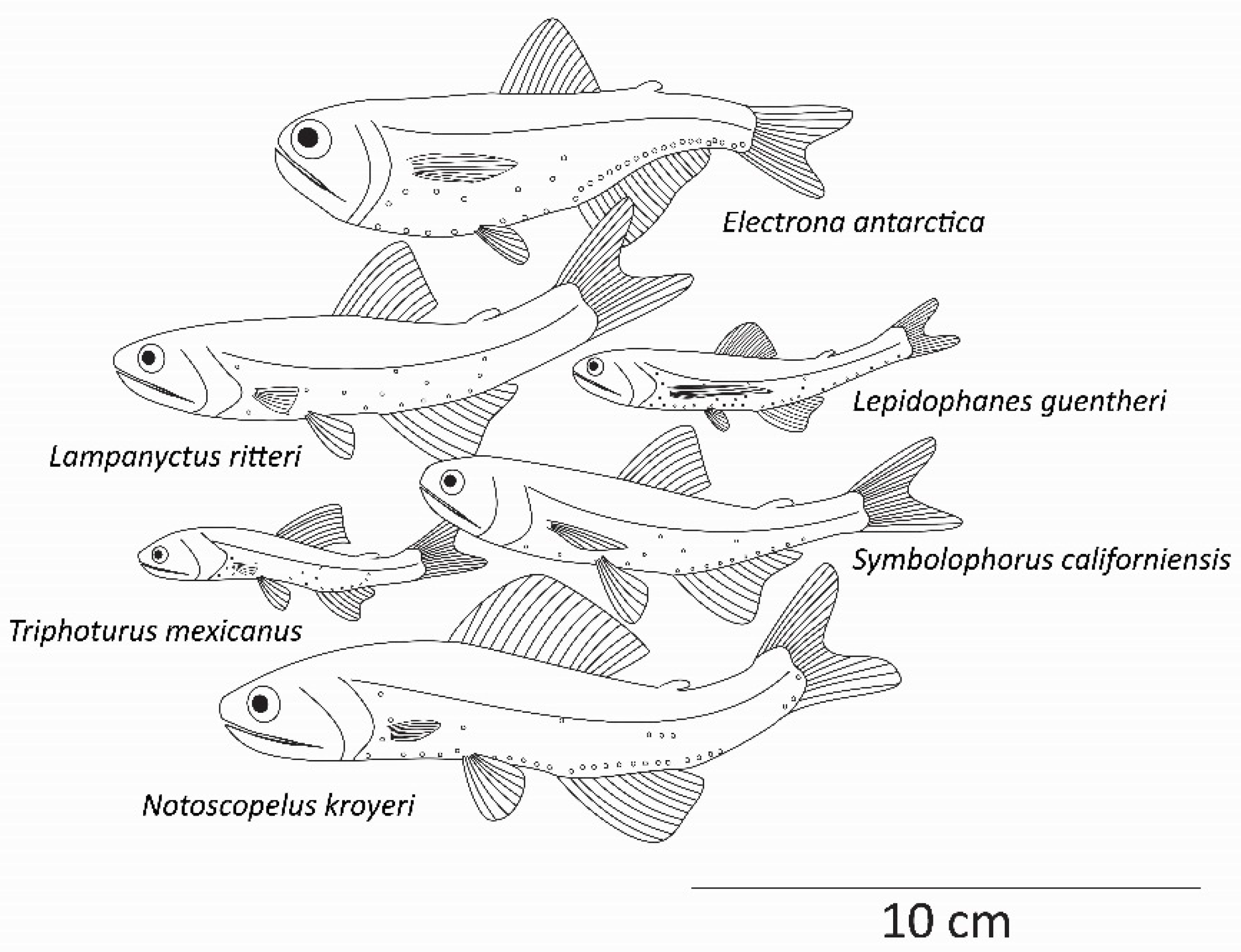
Some lanternfish species (family Myctophidae)

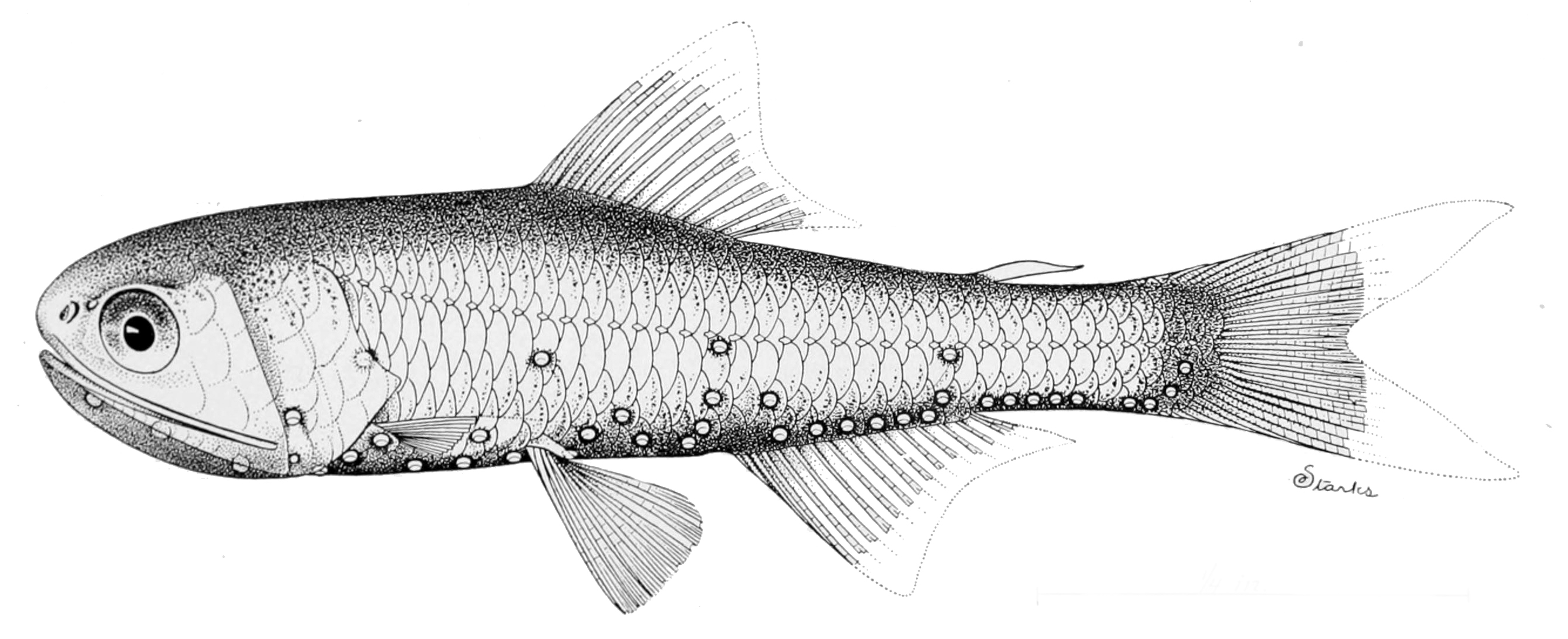
Lanternfish use ventrolateral (belly) photophores as counterillumination to camouflage their silhouette when viewed from below.

Lanternfish are well known for their diel vertical migrations: during daylight hours, most species remain within the gloomy mesopelagic zone, between 300 and 1,500 m (980 and 4,920 ft) deep, but towards sundown, the fish begin to rise into the epipelagic zone, between 10 and 100 m (33 and 328 ft) deep. The lanternfish are thought to do this to avoid predation, and because they are following the diel vertical migrations of zooplankton, upon which they feed. After a night spent feeding in the surface layers of the water column, the lanternfish begin to descend back into the lightless depths and are gone by daybreak. By releasing fecal pellets at depth, Lanternfish make the carbon capture process called biological pump more efficient.

Most species remain near the coast, schooling over the continental slope. Different species are known to segregate themselves by depth, forming dense, discrete conspecific layers, probably to avoid competition between different species. Due to their gas bladders, these layers are visible on sonar scans and give the impression of a "false ocean bottom"; this is the so-called deep scattering layer that so perplexed early oceanographers (see below).

Great variability in migration patterns occurs within the family. Some deeper-living species may not migrate at all, while others may do so only sporadically. Migration patterns may also depend on life stage, sex, latitude, and season.

The arrangements of lanternfish photophores are different for each species, so their bioluminescence is thought to play a role in communication, specifically in shoaling and courtship behaviour. The concentration of the photophores on the flanks of the fish also indicate the light's use as camouflage; in a strategy termed counterillumination, the lanternfish regulate the brightness of the bluish light emitted by their photophores to match the ambient light level above, effectively masking the lanternfishes' silhouette when viewed from below.

A major source of food for many marine animals, lanternfish are an important link in the food chain of many local ecosystems, being heavily preyed upon by whales and dolphins, large pelagic fish such as salmon, tuna and sharks, grenadiers and other deep-sea fish (including other lanternfish), pinnipeds, sea birds, notably penguins, and large squid such as the jumbo squid, Dosidicus gigas.

Lanternfish themselves have been found to feed on bits of plastic debris accumulating in the oceans. At least one lanternfish was found with over 80 pieces of plastic chips in its gut, according to scientists monitoring ocean plastic in the Pacific Ocean's eastern garbage patch.

== Deep scattering layer ==
Sonar operators, using the newly developed sonar technology during World War II, were puzzled by what appeared to be a false sea floor 300–500 metres deep at day, and less deep at night. This turned out to be due to millions of marine organisms, most particularly small mesopelagic fish, with swimbladders that reflected the sonar. These organisms migrate up into shallower water at dusk to feed on plankton. The layer is deeper when the moon is out, and can become shallower when clouds pass over the moon.

Sampling via deep trawling indicates that lanternfish account for as much as 65% of all deep sea fish biomass. Indeed, lanternfish are among the most widely distributed, populous, and diverse of all vertebrates, playing an important ecological role as prey for larger organisms. The estimated global biomass of lanternfish is 550–660 million tonnes, several times the entire world fisheries catch.

== Rise to dominance ==
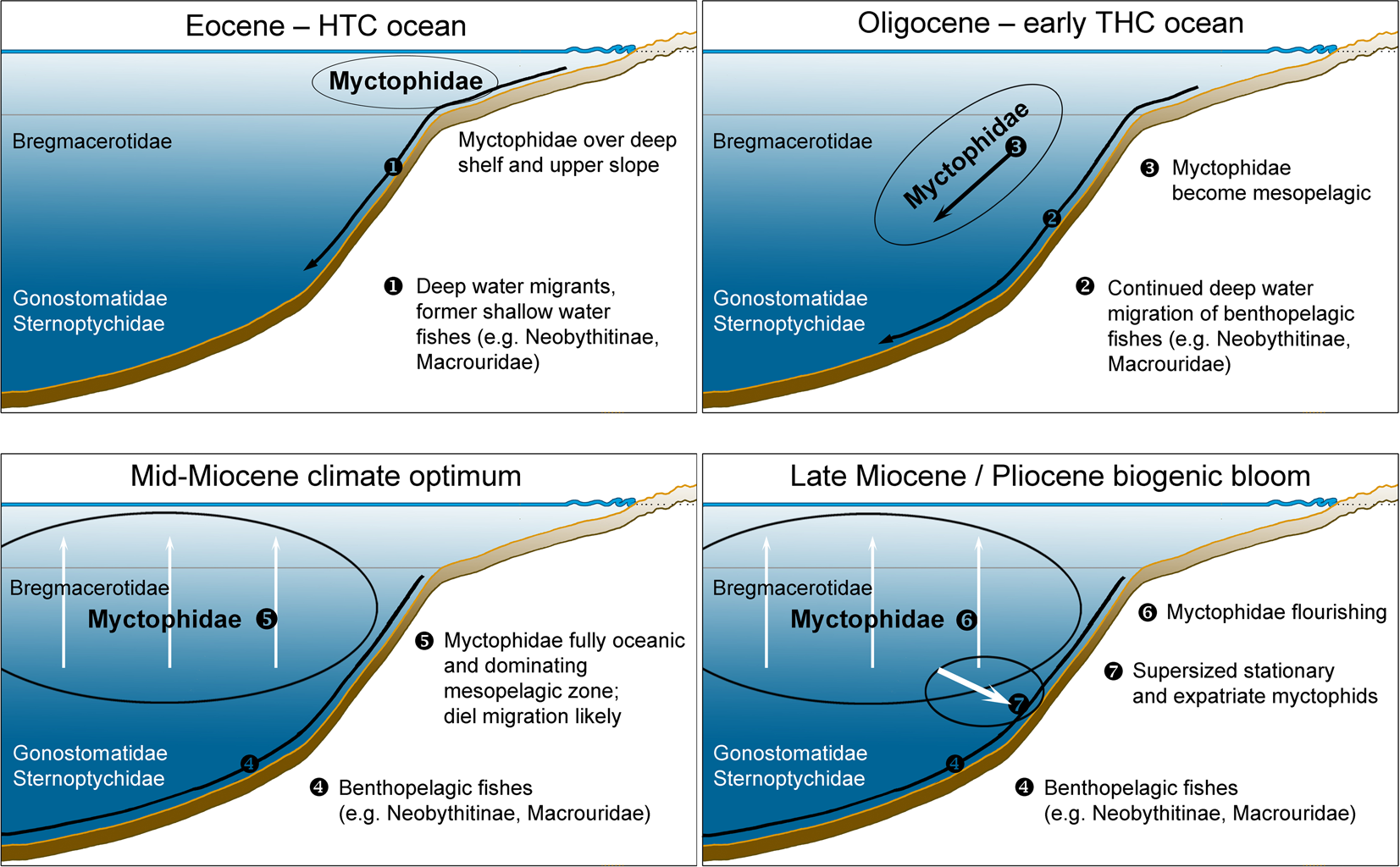
Population of the deep-sea lanternfish (Myctophidae) and other groups Interpretation of bathymetric and oceanic habitat of selected teleost groups in the Eocene halothermal (HTC) ocean (upper left), Oligocene early thermohaline (THC) ocean (upper right), middle Miocene climate optimum (lower left), and during the time of the "biogenic bloom" (lower right). Black arrows indicate presumed phases of down-slope or open-oceanic migrations. White arrows indicate presumed established diel vertical migration in lanternfish.

Lanternfish currently represent one of the dominant groups of mesopelagic fishes in terms of abundance, biomass, and diversity. Their otolith record dominates pelagic sediments below 200 m in dredges, especially during the entire Neogene. The diversity and rise to dominance of lanternfish can be examined by analysing these otolith records. The earliest unambiguous fossil lanternfish are known based on otoliths from the late Paleocene and early Eocene. During their early evolutionary history, lanternfish were likely not adapted to a high oceanic lifestyle but occurred over shelf and upper-slope regions, where they were locally abundant during the middle Eocene.

A distinct upscaling in otolith size is observed in the early Oligocene, which also marks their earliest occurrence in bathyal sediments. This transition is interpreted to be related to the change from a halothermal deep-ocean circulation to a thermohaline regime and the associated cooling of the deep ocean and rearrangement of nutrient and silica supply. The size of early Oligocene lanternfish is remarkably congruent with diatom abundance, the main food resource for the zooplankton and thus for lanternfish and whales. The warmer late Oligocene to early middle Miocene period was characterised by an increase in the disparity of lanternfish but with a reduction in their otolith sizes. A second and persisting secular pulse in lanternfish diversity (particularly within the genus Diaphus) and increase in size begins with the "biogenic bloom" during the late Miocene, paralleled with diatom abundance and gigantism in baleen whales.

== Genera ==
Benthosema
Bolinichthys
Centrobranchus
Ceratoscopelus
Ctenoscopelus
Dasyscopelus
Diaphus
Diogenichthys
Electrona
Gonichthys
Gymnoscopelus
Hintonia
Hygophum
Idiolychnus
Krefftichthys
Lampadena
Lampanyctodes
Lampanyctus
Lampichthys
Lepidophanes
Lobianchia
Loweina
Metelectrona
Myctophum
Nannobrachium
Notolychnus
Notoscopelus
Parvilux
Protomyctophum
Scopelopsis
Stenobrachius
Symbolophorus
Taaningichthys
Tarletonbeania
Triphoturus

The following fossil genera are also known:

- Garganomyctophum
- Eokrefftia
- Eomyctophum
- Oligophus
