= List of marine vertebrates of the Cape Peninsula and False Bay =

Regional biodiversity species list

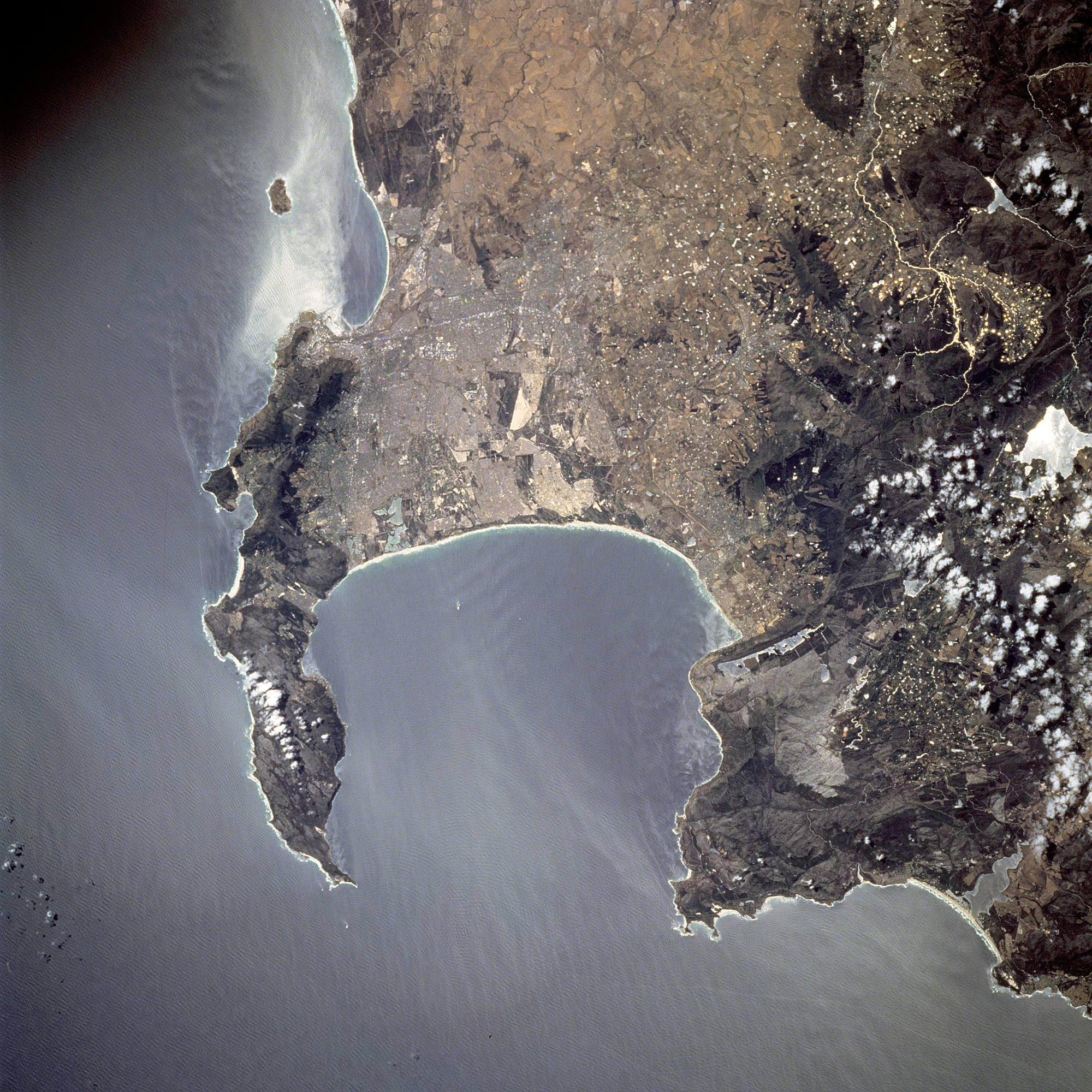
Astronaut photo of Cape Town showing the Cape Peninsula, and surrounding waters, including False Bay.

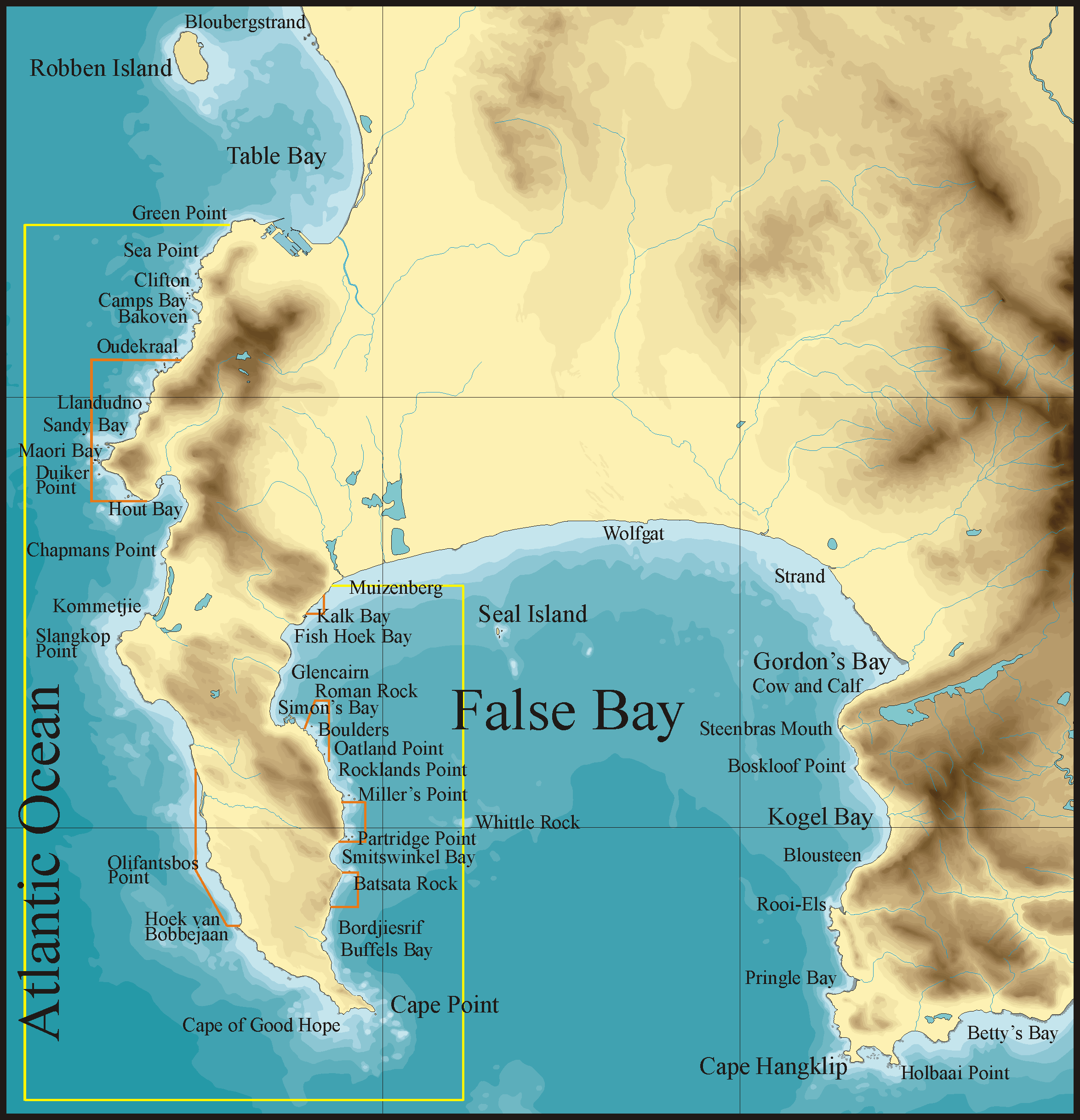
Map showing approximate extent of the range of the article and identifying key locations and the borders of the Table Mountain National Park Marine Protected Area

Marine ecoregions of the South African exclusive economic zone

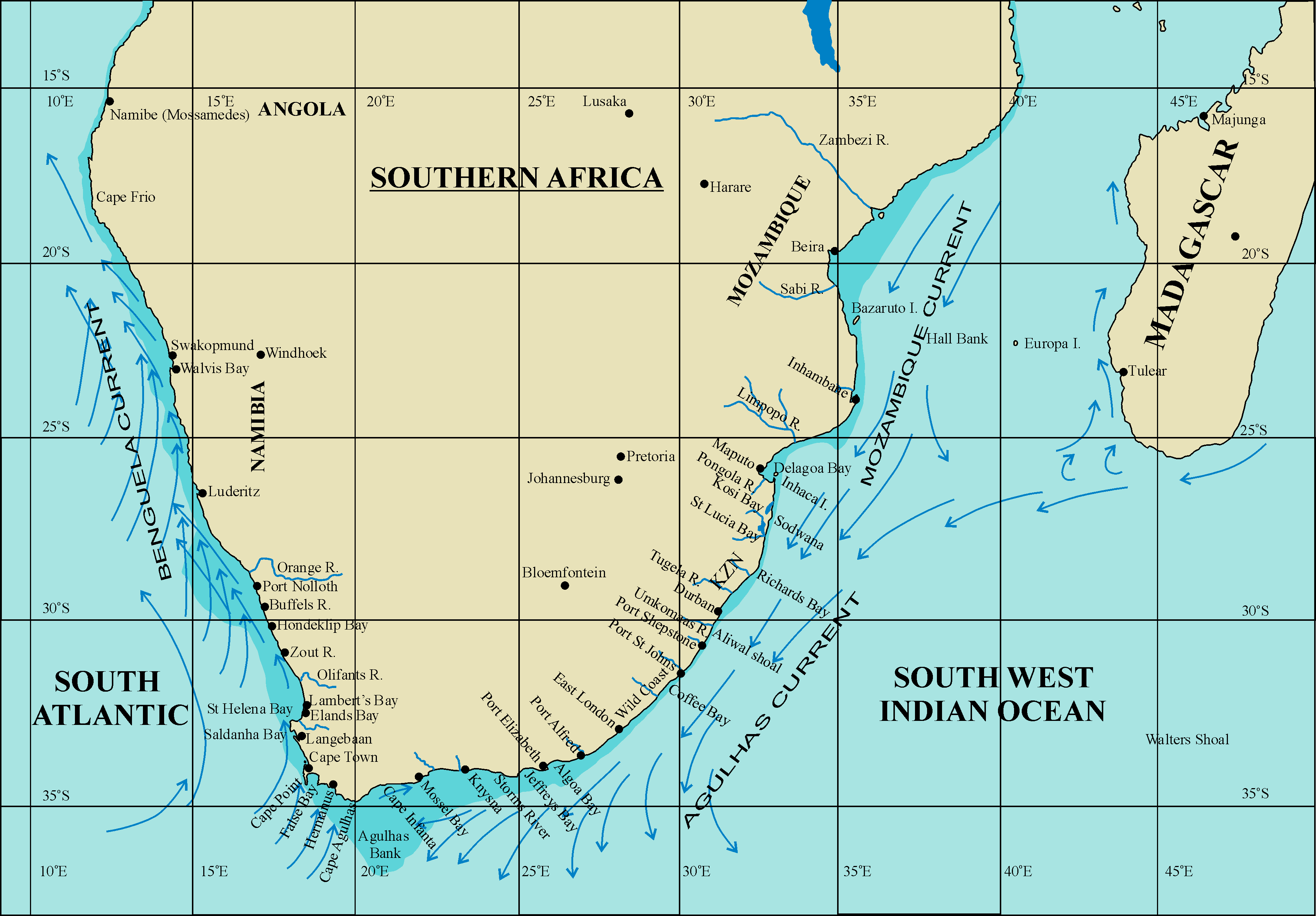
Marine species distribution reference map of the Southern African coastline, showing key range locations

The list of marine vertebrates of the Cape Peninsula and False Bay is a list of marine and shore-based vertebrate animal species that form a part of the fauna of South Africa and that have been recorded from this geographical range. In some cases they are an important part of the local ecological community, and others may have been passing through, or were carried out of their natural ranges by the vagaries of ocean currents or winds. Some of the animals are deep within their range of endemism, or near its borders, while others are cosmopolitan or recently arrived aliens. This list includes animals which live entirely marine lives, or which spend critical parts of their lives at sea, or rely on the sea or intertidal shore for the major part of their diet.

The geographical range is from Bloubergstrand at the north of Table Bay to Cape Hangklip, the south eastern limit of False Bay, in the Western Cape province of South Africa and includes the Table Mountain National Park Marine Protected Area (TMNP MPA), the Helderberg Marine Protected Area, and part of the Robben Island Marine Protected Area.

Most of the shore is within the City of Cape Town, except for a section of the east coast of False Bay, south of Kogel Bay, which is in the Overstrand Local Municipality

The region is near to several universities and research institutions in Cape Town and Stellenbosch, which has led to many studies of the organisms and of the marine ecology, particularly those organisms that are easily or incidentally collected. The popularity of these waters for recreational diving has led to an increase in reported underwater photographic observations in recent years.

== Fishes ==
=== Agnatha – jawless fishes (cyclostomes) ===
Order Myxiniformes – hagfishes
Family: Myxinidae

- Sixgill hagfish or snotslang, Eptatretus hexatrema (Müller, 1834) (Walvis Bay to Durban)
- Fivegill hagfish, Eptatretus profundus Barnard, 1923 (off Cape Point)
- Cape hagfish, Myxine capensis Regan, 1913 (Cape of Good Hope)

=== Gnathostomata – jawed fishes ===
==== Chondrichthyes – cartilaginous fishes ====
Elasmobranchii – sharks and rays
Order Myliobatiformes – stingrays
Family Myliobatidae – eagle rays

- Manta, Manta birostris (Donndorff, 1798) (possibly circumtropical, from the Cape eastwards)
- Eagle ray, Myliobatis aquila (Linnaeus, 1758) (Namibia to KwaZulu-Natal)
- Bull ray, Aetomylaeus bovinus (Geoffroy Saint-Hilaire, 1817), also recorded as syn. Pteromylaeus bovinus (Saint-Hilaire, 1817) (south-western Cape to Zanzibar)

===== Order Rajiformes – rays, skates and guitarfish =====
Family Dasyatidae – stingrays

- Short-tail stingray, Bathytoshia brevicaudata (Hutton, 1875) recorded as syn. Dasyatis brevicaudata (Hutton, 1875) (False Bay to Delagoa Bay)
- Thorntail stingray,Bathytoshia lata (Garman, 1880), recorded as syn. Dasyatis thetidis Ogilby, 1899, (TMNP MPA).
- Blue stingray, Dasyatis chrysonota (Smith, 1828) (Central Angola to Delagoa Bay) also recorded as Dasyatis marmorata (Steindachner, 1892)
- Diamond ray, butterfly ray, Gymnura natalensis (Gilchrist & Thompson, 1911), (TMNP MPA).
- Whiptail stingrays, Dasyatis spp. (TMNP MPA).

Family Rajidae – skates

- Bathyraja smithii (Müller & Henle, 1841) (Agulhas bank and west of Cape Town)
- Cruriraja durbanensis (von Bonde and Swart, 1923) (off Western Cape province)
- Cruriraja parcomaculata von Bonde and Swart, 1923 (Lüderitz to Durban)
- Slimeskate, Dipturus pullopunctatus (Smith, 1964) recorded as syn. Raja pullopunctata Smith, 1964 (Lüderitz to Mozambique)
- African dwarf skate, Neoraja stehmanni (Hulley, 1972) (west of Cape Town to south of Agulhas Bank)
- Munchkin skate, Rajella caudispinosa (von Bonde and Swart, 1923), recorded as syn.Raja caudaspinosa von Bonde and Swart, 1923 (Lüderitz to Cape Point)
- Thornback skate, Raja clavata Linnaeus, 1758 (Walvis Bay to Durban)
- Twineye skate, brown ray, Raja miraletus Linnaeus, 1758 (False Bay to Durban)
- Smoothback skate, Rajella ravidula (Hulley, 1970), recorded as syn. Raja ravidula Hulley, 1970 (off Cape Town)
- Amblyraja hyperborea (Collett, 1879) recorded as syn. Raja robertsi Hulley, 1970 (west of Cape Town)
- Malacoraja spinacidermis (Barnard, 1923) recorded as syn. Raja spinacidermis Barnard, 1923 (off west coast)
- Thornback skate, Raja clavata Linnaeus, 1758, (TMNP MPA).
- Twineye skate, brown ray, Raja miraletus Linnaeus, 1758, (TMNP MPA).
- Biscuit skate or false thornback skate, spotted skate, Raja straeleni Poll, 1951 (West Africa to East London)
- Blancmange skate, Leucoraja wallacei (Hulley, 1970) recorded as syn.Raja wallacei Hulley, 1970 (Cape to Limpopo river mouth)
- Bigthorn skate, Rajella barnardi (Norman, 1935), recorded as syn. Raja confundens Hulley, 1970 (West coast from 19°S to east of Cape Point)
- Ghost skate, Rajella dissimilis (Hulley, 1970) recorded as syn. Raja dissimilis Hulley, 1970 (west of Cape Town)
- Leopard skate, Rajella leoparda (von Bonde & Swart, 1923), recorded as syn. Raja leopardus von Bonde and Swart, 1923 (west coast from 18°S to 35°S)
- Spearnose skate, bottlenose skate, Rostroraja alba (Lacepède, 1803) (West Africa to Madagascar) (syn. Raja alba or Raia alba Lacepède, 1803)

Family Rhinobatidae – guitarfish

- Lesser sandshark or lesser guitarfish, Acroteriobatus annulatus (Müller & Henle, 1841), recorded as syn. Rhinobatos annulatus Smith in Müller & Henle, 1841 (Cape Columbine to Mozambique)
- Bluntnose guitarfish, Rhinobatos blochii Müller & Henle, 1841 (Cape to Walvis Bay)

Order Torpediniformes – electric rays
Family Narkidae

- Onefin electric ray, Cape sleeper ray, or torpedo ray, Narke capensis (Gmelin, 1789) (Atlantic coast of Cape Peninsula to Madagascar)

Family Torpedinidae

- Blackspotted electric ray, blackspotted torpedo Torpedo fuscomaculata Peters, 1855 (Cape Columbine to Mozambique)
- Marbled torpedo, Marbled electric ray, Torpedo marmorata Risso, 1810, (TMNP MPA).
- Atlantic electric ray, Atlantic torpedo, Torpedo nobiliana Bonaparte, 1835 (Western Cape coast to Algoa Bay)
- Torpedo spp.

===== Order Carcharhiniformes – ground sharks =====
Family Carcharhinidae – requiem sharks

- Copper shark, Carcharhinus brachyurus (Günther, 1870) (Namibia to Durban)
- Spinner shark, Carcharhinus brevipinna (Müller & Henle, 1839), (TMNP MPA).
- Blacktip shark, Carcharhinus limbatus (Müller & Henle, 1839), (TMNP MPA).
- Dusky shark, Carcharhinus obscurus (Lesueur, 1818) (Cape Point to Mozambique)
- Sandbar shark, Carcharhinus plumbeus (Nardo, 1827), (TMNP MPA).
- Blue shark, Prionace glauca (Linnaeus, 1758) (off south-western Cape coast)

Family Scyliorhinidae – catsharks

- Smalleye catshark, Apristurus microps (Gilchrist, 1922) (Western Cape to Agulhas)
- Saldanha catshark, Apristurus saldanha (Barnard 1925) (Saldanha Bay)
- Tiger catshark, Halaelurus natalensis (Regan, 1904) (Saldanha Bay to Algoa Bay)
- Puffadder shyshark or happy eddie, Haploblepharus edwardsii (Schinz, 1822) (Cape Point to central KwaZulu-Natal)
- Dark shyshark, dusky shyshark or skaamoog, Haploblepharus pictus (Müller & Henle, 1838) (Namibia to Cape Agulhas)
- Izak catshark, Holohalaelurus regani (Gilchrist, 1922) (south-western Cape to Zanzibar)
- Pyjama catshark, pyjama shark, or striped catshark, Poroderma africanum (Gmelin, 1789) (Cape Columbine to central KwaZulu-Natal)
- Leopard catshark, Poroderma pantherinum (Müller & Henle, 1838) (Cape Columbine to Durban)
- Yellowspotted catshark, Scyliorhinus capensis (Smith, 1838) (south-western Cape to KwaZulu-Natal)

Family Sphyrnidae – hammerhead sharks

- Smooth hammerhead, Sphyrna zygaena (Linnaeus, 1758) (south Cape to southern Mozambique, occasionally on west coast. Warm temperate waters of both hemispheres)

Family Triakidae – houndsharks

- Soupfin shark, tope, Galeorhinus galeus (Linnaeus, 1758) (Angola to East London)
- Smooth-hound shark, Mustelus mustelus (Linnaeus, 1758) (Namibia to KwaZulu-Natal)
- Whitespotted smooth-hound, Mustelus palumbes Smith, 1957 (Walvis Bay to Algoa Bay)
- Spotted gully shark, Triakis megalopterus (Smith, 1839) (Walvis Bay to East London)

===== Order Hexanchiformes – cow and frill sharks =====
Family Hexanchidae – cow sharks

- Sixgill shark, Hexanchus griseus (Bonnaterre, 1788) (All oceans)
- Bigeye sixgill shark, Hexanchus vitulus Springer and Waller, 1969 (Atlantic, south-west Indian Ocean)
- Spotted sevengill cowshark or broadnose sevengill shark, Notorynchus cepedianus (Péron, 1807) (Namibia to East London)

===== Order Lamniformes – mackerel sharks =====
Family Alopiidae – thresher sharks

- Thintail thresher, Alopias vulpinus (Bonnaterre, 1788) (throughout SA waters, more common in southern part)

Family Cetorhinidae – basking sharks

- Basking shark, Cetorhinus maximus (Gunnerus, 1765) (temperate waters of all oceans, a few records from south-western Cape)

Family Lamnidae – mackerel sharks

- Great white shark, Carcharodon carcharias (Linnaeus, 1758) (Namibia to Mozambique)
- Shortfin mako shark, Isurus oxyrinchus Rafinesque, 1810 (warm temperate and tropical waters of all oceans)
- Porbeagle, Lamna nasus (Bonnaterre, 1788) (Temperate oceans, recorded from False Bay and possibly Knysna)

Family Mitsukurinidae – goblin sharks

- Goblin shark, Mitsukurina owstoni Jordan, 1898 (west of Cape Town, and off Transkei coast)

Family Odontaspididae

- Ragged-tooth shark or spotted ragged-tooth shark, Carcharias taurus Rafinesque, 1810 (Cape Point to Mozambique) also reported as syn. Eugomphodus taurus (Rafinesque, 1810)

Family Pseudocarchariidae – crocodile sharks

- Crocodile shark, Pseudocarcharias kamoharai (Matsubara, 1936) (once found near Cape Town)

===== Order Orectolobiformes – carpet sharks =====
Family Rhincodontidae – whale sharks

- Whale shark, Rhincodon typus Smith, 1828 (type specimen from Table Bay, normally northern KwaZulu-Natal)

===== Order Pristiophoriformes – sawsharks =====
Family Pristiophoridae

- Sixgill sawshark, Pliotrema warreni Regan, 1906 (False Bay to southern Mozambique)

===== Order Squaliformes – dogfish sharks =====
Family Echinorhinidae – bramble sharks

- Bramble shark, Echinorhinus brucus (Bonnaterre, 1788) (Namibia to southern KwaZulu-Natal)

Family Etmopteridae

- Southern lantern shark, Etmopterus granulosus (Günther, 1880), (TMNP MPA).

Family Squalidae – dogfishes

- Centrophorus granulosus (Bloch and Schneider, 1801) (Western Cape)
- Leafscale gulper shark, Centrophorus squamosus Bonnaterre, 1788 (Western Cape and Algoa Bay)
- Centroscyllium fabricii (Reinhardt, 1825) (Western Cape)
- Centroscymnus crepidater (Bocage and Capello, 1864) (Western Cape)
- Deania calcea (Lowe, 1839) (Cape Point and Algoa Bay)
- Deania profundorum (Smith and Radcliffe, 1912) (West coast and KwaZulu-Natal)
- Deania quadrispinosa (McCulloch, 1915) (northern Namibia to southern Mozambique)
- Short-tail lanternshark, Etmopterus brachyurus Smith and Radcliffe, 1912 (Western Cape, KwaZulu-Natal and southern Mozambique)
- Etmopterus granulosus (Günther, 1880) (Cape Point)
- Etmopterus sp. (off south-western Cape Province, northern KwaZulu-Natal)
- Euprotomicroides zantedeschia Hulley and Penrith, 1966 (west of Cape Town)
- Euprotomicrus bispinatus (Quoy and Gaimard, 1824) (all oceans)
- Flatiron shark, Oxynotus centrina (Linnaeus, 1758) (Walvis Bay to Cape Town)
- Greenland shark, Somniosus microcephalus (Schneider, 1801) (off Cape Columbine)
- Spotted spiny dogfish, Spiny (Picked) dogfish Squalus acanthias Linnaeus, 1758 (south-western Cape to Port Elizabeth)
- Bluntnose spiny dogfish, Shortnose spurdog Squalus megalops (MacLeay, 1881) (Namibia to southern Mozambique)
- Longnose spiny dogfish, Squalus mitsukurii Jordan and Fowler, 1903 (Orange river to Beira)
- Squalus spp.

==== Holocephali – chimaeras ====
===== Order Chimaeriformes =====
Family Callorhinchidae – elephantfish

- St Joseph shark or elephant fish, Callorhinchus capensis Duméril, 1865 (Namibia to central KwaZulu-Natal)

Family Chimaeridae – chimaeras

- Cape chimaera, Chimaera sp. (Lüderitz to Cape Point)

Family Rhinochimaeridae – longnose chimaeras

- Harriotta raleighana Goode and Bean, 1895 (off Western Cape)
- Rhinochimaera africana Compagno, Stehman and Ebert, 1990 (west coast off Doring Bay and Cape Columbine, Natal coast off Kosi Bay)
- Rhinochimaera atlantica Holt and Byrne, 1909 (Namibia to Plettenberg Bay)

==== Class Actinopterygii – ray finned fishes ====
===== Order Acanthuriformes =====
Family: Chaetodontidae – butterflyfishes

- Doublesash butterflyfish, Chaetodon marleyi Regan, 1921 (Lamberts Bay to Maputo. Endemic)

Family Luvaridae – louvar

- Louvar, Luvarus imperialis Rafinesque, 1810 (All oceans and Mediterranean sea, not reported in polar seas or near equator)

===== Order: Acropomatiformes =====
Family: Champsodontidae – Gapers

- Gaper, Champsodon capensis (Regan, 1908) (Cape of Good Hope to Durban)

Family: Epigonidae – cardinal fishes (see also Apogonidae)

- Pencil cardinal, Epigonus denticulatus Dieuzeide, 1950 (Walvis Bay to Cape Point)
- Epigonus pandionis (Goode & Bean, 1881) (Gulf of Guinea to Agulhas Bank)
- Epigonus robustus (Barnard, 1927) (off west coast of South Africa)
- Telescope cardinal, Epigonus telescopus (Risso, 1810) (Walvis Bay to Cape Town)

Family: Howellidae – lanternbellies

- Howella sherborni (Norman, 1930) (off Cape Town to Natal)

Family: Pentacerotidae – armourheads

- Cape armourhead, Pentaceros capensis Cuvier, 1829 (Port Nolloth to Southern Mozambique)
- Pelagic armourhead, Pentaceros richardsoni, recorded as Pseudopentaceros (Smith, 1844) (Cape Town to Natal)

Family: Polyprionidae – wreckfishes

- Wreckfish, Polyprion americanus (Schneider, 1801) (Norway to South Africa)

Family: Scombropidae – gnomefishes

- Gnomefish, Scombrops boops (Houttuyn, 1782) (Cape of Good Hope to Delagoa Bay)

===== Order Anguilliformes – eels =====
Family Anguillidae – freshwater eels

- Madagascar mottled eel, Anguilla marmorata Quoy and Gaimard, 1824 (Western Cape to Kenya)
- Longfin eel, Anguilla mossambica (Peters, 1852) (most waters from the Cape northwards)

Family Congridae – conger eels

- Hairy conger, Bassanago albescens (Barnard, 1923) (Cape Point)
- Bathyuroconger vicinus (Vaillant, 1888) (off Cape Point)
- Cape conger, Conger wilsoni (Bloch and Schneider 1801) (Cape to southern Mozambique)
- Southern conger, Gnathophis capensis (Kaup, 1856) (False Bay to Plettenberg Bay)
- Strap conger, Gnathophis habenatus (Richardson, 1848) (southern Cape to East London)

Family Derichthyidae – longneck eels

- Derichthys serpentinus Gill, 1884 (west of Cape Town; worldwide)
- Duckbill oceanic eel, spoonbill eel, Nessorhamphus ingolfianus (Schmidt, 1912) (off the Cape, also worldwide)

Family Nemichthyidae – snipe eels

- Avocettina acuticeps (Regan, 1916) (offshore Cape to Natal)
- Nemichthys curvirostris (Strömman, 1896) (off the Cape)
- Slender snipe-eel, Nemichthys scolopaceus (Richardson, 1848) (off the Cape to Natal)

Family: Nettastomatidae – witch eels

- Venefica proboscidea (Vaillant, 1888) (off the Cape)

Family Ophichthidae – snake-eels and worm-eels

- Slender snake-eel, Ophichthus serpentinus Seale, 1917. syn. Ophichthus bennettai (Cape Province west coast)

Family Serrivomeridae – sawtooth eels

- Stout sawpalate, Serrivomer beanii Gill and Ryder, 1883 (off Cape and Natal)

Family Synaphobranchidae – cutthroat eels

- Basketwork eel, Diastobranchus capensis Barnard, 1923 (off Cape Point)
- Ilyophis brunneus Gilbert, 1892 (off the Cape)
- Snubnose eel, Simenchelys parasitica Gill, 1879 (off the Cape)
- Northern cutthroat eel, slatjaw cutthroat eel, Synaphobranchus kaupii Johnson, 1862 (off the Cape)

===== Order Ateleopodiformes =====
Family Ateleopodidae – tadpole fishes

- Ateleopus natalensis Regan, 1921 (Cape to Red Sea)
- Guentherus altivela Osorio, 1917 (West coast of Africa from Cabo Blanco to the Cape)
- Ijimaia loppei Roule, 1922 (Morocco to Cape Peninsula)

===== Order Atheriniformes =====
Family Atherinidae – silversides

- Cape silverside, Atherina breviceps Valenciennes, 1835 (Lüderitz to northern KwaZulu-Natal)

===== Order Aulopiformes =====
Family Alepisauridae – lancetfishes

- Longsnout lancetfish, Alepisaurus ferox Lowe, 1833 (Walvis Bay to Sodwana Bay; in all major oceans)

Family Bathysauropsidae

- Bathysauropsis gracilis (Günther, 1878) (off Cape Point; circumglobal in southern oceans)

Family Chlorophthalmidae – greeneyes

- Chlorophthalmus punctatus Gilchrist, 1904 (both coasts of South Africa)

Family Evermannellidae – sabretooth fishes

- Coccorella atlantica (Parr, 1928) (central water areas of all 3 major oceans; off western and south-western Cape coast, 1 specimen from 31°34'S, 30°09'E)

Family Ipnopidae

- Bathypterois filiferus Gilchrist, 1906 (off Cape Point)
- Bathypterois phenax Parr, 1928 (off Cape Point)
- Ipnops agassizii Garman, 1899 (off Cape Point)

Family Notosudidae – notosudids

- Scopelosaurus ahlstromi Bertelsen, Krefft and Marshall, 1976 (all 3 oceans from about 32° to 45°S)
- Scopelosaurus hamiltoni (Waite, 1916) (southern oceans from about 30° to 60°S)
- Scopelosaurus herwigi Bertelson, Kreft and Marshall, 1976 (slope areas of Southern Africa)
- Scopelosaurus meadi Bertelson, Krefft and Marshall, 1976 (from about 19° to 43°S)

Family Paralepididae – barracudinas

- Lestidiops jayakari (Boulenger, 1889) (worldwide in tropical to temperate waters)
- Macroparalepis affinis Ege, 1933 (anti-tropical in Atlantic Ocean)
- Magnisudis prionosa (Rofen, 1963) (circumglobal in southern oceans from 20°S to Antarctic)
- Arctozenus risso (Bonaparte, 1840) (syn, Notolepis rissoi) (worldwide in temperate and tropical waters)
- Sudis hyalina Rafinesque, 1810 (Atlantic Ocean from 50°N to South Africa)

Family Scopelarchidae – pearleyes

- Benthalbella infans Zugmayer, 1911 (off south-western Cape; tropical/subtropical in all 3 major oceans)
- Lagiacrusichthys macropinnis (Bussing & Bussing, 1966) recorded as syn. Benthalbella macropinna Bussing and Bussing, 1966 (off south-western Cape coast; circumpolar in subantarctic and Antarctic waters)
- Scopelarchus analis (Brauer, 1902) (common off southern Africa; tropical/subtropical all oceans)

Family Synodontidae

- Snakefish, Trachinocephalus myops (Forster, 1801), (TMNP MPA).

===== Order Batrachoidiformes =====
Family Batrachoididae – toadfishes

- Snakehead toadfish, Batrichthys apiatus (Valenciennes, 1837) (Saldanha Bay to Umtata River, Transkei)
- Pleated toadfish, Chatrabus felinus (Smith, 1952). syn. Batrichthys felinus (Cape to Port Alfred)

===== Order Beloniformes =====
Family Exocoetidae – flyingfishes

- Smallhead flyingfish, Cheilopogon altipennis (Valenciennes, 1847) also recorded as syn. Cheilopogon pinnatibarbatus altipinnis (Valenciennes, 1846) (Cape to Kosi Bay))
- Subtropical flyingfish, Hirundichthys rondeletii (Valenciennes, 1846) (widely distributed in subtropical waters of all oceans, common off the Cape)
- Mirrorwing flyingfish, Hirundichthys speculiger (Valenciennes, 1846) (worldwide in tropical waters, one juvenile from Mbibi, Zululand, another from False Bay)

Family Hemiramphidae – halfbeaks

- Ribbon halfbeak, Euleptorhamphus viridis (van Hasselt, 1823) (reported from Table Bay, also known from Algoa Bay and Kei River mouth, tropical and temperate waters of Indo-Pacific)
- Cape halfbeak, Hyporhamphus capensis (Thominot, 1886) (False Bay to southern Mozambique))

Family Belonidae – needlefishes

- Cape needlefish, Petalichthys capensis Regan, 1904 (False Bay to Pondoland)

Family Scomberesocidae – sauries

- Dwarf saury, Scomberesox simulans (Hubbs & Wisner, 1980), recorded as syn. Nanichthys simulans Hubbs and Wisner, 1980 (off the Cape up the west coast, warm temperate waters of the Atlantic and southern Indian oceans)

===== Order Beryciformes =====
Family Berycidae – berycids

- Beryx, Beryx decadactylus Cuvier, 1829 (Saldanha Bay to Natal)
- Slender beryx, Beryx splendens Lowe, 1834 (Saldanha Bay to Natal)
- Short alfonsino, Centroberyx spinosus (Gilchrist, 1903) (False Bay and Storms River to Durban)

Family Monocentridae – pineapple fishes

- Pineapple fish, Japanese pineapple fish, Monocentris japonica (Houttuyn, 1782) (Indo-West Pacific and Red Sea south to Mossel Bay)(Recorded from False Bay on at least two occasions)

Family Trachichthyidae – slimeheads

- Gephyroberyx darwinii (Johnson, 1866) (all round South African coast)
- Orange roughy, Hoplostethus atlanticus Collett, 1896 (From Iceland to Morocco and Walvis Bay to off Durban)
- Black slimehead, Hoplostethus cadenati Quero, 1974 (West coast of Africa from 36°N – 26°S, and off Transkei)
- Silver roughy, Hoplostethus mediterraneus Cuvier, 1829 (Namibia to Natal)
- Hoplostethus melanopus (Weber, 1913) (Indo-West pacific from Indonesia to Natal, also off Namibia and Cape Town)

===== Order Blenniiformes =====
Family Blenniidae – blennies

- Looseskin blenny, Chalaroderma capito (Valenciennes, 1836) (Saldanha Bay to East London)
- Two-eyed blenny, Chalaroderma ocellata (Gilchrist and Thompson, 1908) ((Saldanha Bay to Port Elizabeth)
- Horned blenny, Parablennius cornutus (Linnaeus, 1758) (Northern Namibia to Sodwana Bay, Endemic)
- Piano blenny, Plagiotremus tapeinosoma (Bleeker, 1857) (Indo-Pacific south to False Bay)
- Maned blenny, Scartella emarginata (Günther, 1861) (Southern Angola to India)
- Japanese snakeblenny, Xiphasia matsubarai Okada & Suzuki, 1952 (Western Indian Ocean south to False Bay)
- Snakeblenny, Xiphasia setifer Swainson, 1839 (Red Sea to False Bay)

Family Clinidae – klipfishes

- Lace klipfish, Blennioclinus brachycephalus (Valenciennes, 1836) (Melkbosstrand to Kei River)
- Snaky klipfish, Blennophis anguillaris (Valenciennes, 1836) (Lüderitz Bay to East London)
- Striped klipfish, Blennophis striatus (Gilchrist & Thompson, 1908) (Saldanha Bay to East London)
- Slender platanna-klipfish, Cancelloxus burrelli Smith, 1961 (Orange River to Algoa Bay)
- Elongated sand klipfish, Cancelloxus longior Prochazka & Griffiths, 1991 (Both sides of the peninsula)
- Barbelled klipfish, Cirrhibarbis capensis Valenciennes, 1836 (Lamberts Bay to East London)
- Fleet klipfish, Climacoporus navalis Barnard, 1935 (Still Bay to Port St. Johns. Once from False Bay)
- Ladder klipfish, Clinoporus biporosus (Gilchrist and Thompson, 1908) (Saldanha Bay to False Bay)
- Sad klipfish, Clinus acuminatus (Bloch & Schneider, 1801) (Lüderitz Bay to west of Algoa Bay)
- Agile klipfish, Clinus agilis Smith, 1931 (Namibia (20°49'S) to Port Alfred)
- Clinus arborescens Gilchrist & Thompson, 1908, previously reported as C. supeciliosus (part of complex)
- Onrust klipfish, Clinus berrisfordi Penrith, 1967 (Weedy areas of False Bay to Skoenmakerskop, just west of Algoa Bay)
- Cape klipfish, Clinus brevicristatus Gilchrist & Thompson, 1908 (Lamberts Bay to False Bay)
- Bluntnose klipfish, Clinus cottoides Valenciennes, 1836 (Olifants River (Western Cape) to Kei River)
- West coast klipfish, Clinus heterodon Valenciennes, 1836 (Orange River to Cape Agulhas)
- False Bay klipfish, Clinus latipennis Valenciennes, 1836 (Table Bay to Cape Agulhas)
- Mosaic klipfish, Clinus musaicus Holleman, von der Heyden & Zsilavecz, 2012, (TMNP MPA).
- Chinese klipfish, Clinus nematopterus Günther, 1861 (False Bay and Algoa Bay)
- Ornate klipfish, Clinus ornatus Gilchrist & Thompson, 1908, (TMNP MPA), also previously recorded in C. superciliosus complex.
- Robust klipfish, Clinus robustus Gilchrist & Thompson, 1908 (Cape of Good Hope to East London)
- Kelp klipfish, Clinus rotundifrons Barnard, 1937 (Lüderitz Bay to Cape of Good Hope)
- Super klipfish or highfin klipfish, Clinus superciliosus (Linnaeus, 1758) (Namibia (18°59'S) to Kei River) now recognised as a complex containing C. superciliosus, C. ornatus, C. arborescens, C. musaicus and C. exasperatus.
- Bull klipfish, Clinus taurus Gilchrist & Thompson, 1908 (Möwe Point (Namibia) to Port Alfred)
- Speckled klipfish, Clinus venustris Gilchrist & Thompson, 1908 (Orange River to East London)(Lüderitz Bay to Port Alfred)
- Mousey klipfish, Fucomimus mus (Gilchrist & Thompson, 1908) (False Bay to Coffee Bay)
- Nosestripe klipfish, Muraenoclinus dorsalis (Bleeker, 1860) (Orange River to Durban)(Lüderitz Bay to southern Natal)
- Bluespotted klipfish, Pavoclinus caeruleopunctatus Zsilavecz, 2001, (TMNP MPA).
- Grass klipfish, Pavoclinus graminis (Gilchrist & Thompson, 1908) (False Bay to Inhambane)
- Slinky klipfish, Pavoclinus litorafontis Penrith, 1965 (False Bay; Strandfontein and Onrust River mouth)
- Peacock klipfish, Pavoclinus pavo (Gilchrist & Thompson, 1908) (Lüderitz Bay to Kei River)
- Deepwater klipfish, Pavoclinus profundus Smith, 1961 (Cape Peninsula, off Knysna to Algoa Bay)
- Deep reef klipfish, Pavoclinus smalei Heemstra & Wright, 1986 (False Bay, off Storms River mouth)
- Leafy klipfish, Smithichthys fucorum (Gilchrist & Thompson, 1908) (Cape Point to Bashee River)
- Platanna klipfish, Xenopoclinus kochi Smith, 1948 (Lamberts Bay to Algoa Bay)
- Leprous platanna klipfish, Xenopoclinus leprosus Smith, 1961 Orange River mouth to Algoa Bay)

Family Tripterygiidae – threefin blennies or triplefins

- Cape triplefin, Cremnochorites capensis (Gilchrist & Thompson, 1908) (False Bay to Port Alfred)

===== Order Callionymiformes =====
Family Callionymidae – dragonets

- Sand dragonet, Callionymus marleyi Regan, 1919 (Cape of Good Hope eastward to Persian Gulf)
- Ladder dragonet, Paracallionymus costatus (Boulenger, 1898) (Lüderitz Bay to Inhaca)

===== Order Carangiformes =====
Family: Carangidae – kingfishes

- Leervis or garrick, Lichia amia (Linnaeus, 1758) (Mediterranean sea south along west coast of Africa and around Cape to Delagoa Bay)
- White kingfish, white trevally Pseudocaranx dentex (Bloch & Schneider, 1801) (Durban southwards, anti-tropical on both sides of Atlantic, Mediterranean, Indo-West Pacific)
- Giant yellowtail, yellowtail amberjack, Seriola lalandi Valenciennes, 1833 (Most common on Atlantic Cape waters, but follows the pilchard migration to Transkei and Natal. Circumglobal in subtropical waters)
- Southern pompano, Trachinotus africanus Smith, 1967, (TMNP MPA).
- Cape horse mackerel, Trachurus capensis Castelnau, 1861, (TMNP MPA).
- Maasbanker, Trachurus trachurus (Linnaeus, 1758) (Norway south and round the Cape of Good Hope to Delagoa Bay

Family: Coryphaenidae – dolphinfish or dorades

- Dolphinfish, Coryphaena hippurus Linnaeus,1758 (all tropical and subtropical waters to 35°S)

Family: Echeneidae – remoras

- Shark remora, Echeneis naucrates Linnaeus, 1758 (Namibia to Mozambique) (all warm waters except eastern Pacific)
- Whale remora, Remora australis (Bennett, 1840) (Worldwide, pelagic: found only on cetaceans)
- Spearfish remora, Remora brachyptera (Lowe, 1839) (Worldwide, prefers billfishes)
- Remora, Remora remora (Linnaeus, 1758) (Worldwide, prefers sharks)
- White remora, Remorina albescens (Temminck & Schlegel, 1845) (Worldwide, prefers Manta rays)

Family: Istiophoridae – sailfish, spearfishes and marlins

- Sailfish, Istiophorus platypterus (Shaw, 1792), (TMNP MPA).
- Black marlin, Makaira indica (Cuvier, 1832) (Primarily Indo-Pacific to off Cape of Good Hope)
- Blue marlin, Makaira nigricans (Lacepèede, 1802) (Worldwide in all oceans)
- White marlin, Tetrapturus albidus Poey, 1861 (Atlantic Ocean)
- Shortbill spearfish, Tetrapturus angustirostris Tanaka, 1914 (Off Cape Point and Durban northwards throughout Indo-Pacific)
- Striped marlin, Tetrapturus audax (Philippi, 1887) (Primarily Indo-Pacific, but have been caught off Cape Town)
- Longbill spearfish, Tetrapturus pfluegeri Robins & de Sylva, 1963 (Apparently restricted to the Atlantic Ocean)

Family: Rachycentridae – cobia

- Prodigal son, Rachycentron canadum (Linnaeus, 1766) (Warm waters of the Atlantic and Indo-Pacific, occasionally reaching False Bay)

Family: Xiphiidae – Swordfishes

- Swordfish, Xiphias gladius Linnaeus, 1758 (Namibia to Natal)

===== Order Centrarchiformes =====
Family: Cheilodactylidae – fingerfins

- Redfingers, Cheilodactylus fasciatus Lacepède, 1803 (Kunene river, Namibia to Durban)
- Barred fingerfin, Cheilodactylus pixi Smith, 1980 (Knysna to Coffee Bay)(False Bay to Coffee Bay)
- Twotone fingerfin, Chirodactylus brachydactylus (Cuvier, 1830) (Walvis Bay to Delagoa Bay)
- Bank steenbras, Chirodactylus grandis (Günther, 1860) (Walvis Bay to possibly Natal)

Family: Dichistiidae – galjoens

- Galjoen, Dichistius capensis (Cuvier, 1831) (Southern Angola to Sodwana Bay) (syn. Coracinus capensis)
- Banded galjoen. Dichistius multifasciatus (Pellegrin, 1914), (TMNP MPA).

Family: Kyphosidae – sea chubs

- Grey chub, brown chub, Kyphosus bigibbus Lacepède, 1801 (Red Sea to Cape Point)
- Stonebream, Neoscorpis lithophilus (Gilchrist & Thompson, 1908) (False Bay to southern Mozambique)

Family: Oplegnathidae – knifejaws

- Cape knifejaw, Oplegnathus conwayi Richardson, 1840 (False Bay to Durban)

Family: Parascorpididae – jutjaw

- Jutjaw, Parascorpis typus Bleeker, 1875 (Known only from False Bay to Maputo)

===== Order Clupeiformes =====
Family Clupeidae – herrings, sardines and pilchards

- Round sardinelle, Sardinella aurita Valenciennes, 1847 (Walvis Bay to Saldanha Bay)
- Pilchard or sardine, Sardinops sagax (Jenyns, 1842) (Namibia to Mozambique) also reported as syn. Sardinops ocellatus (Pappe, 1853).

Family Dussumieriidae

- Roundherring, Etrumeus whiteheadi Wongratana, 1983 (Walvis Bay to KwaZulu-Natal)

Family Ehiravidae

- Estuarine roundherring, Gilchristella aestuaria (Gilchrist, 1913), (TMNP MPA).

Family Engraulidae – anchovies

- European anchovy, Engraulis encrasicolus (Linnaeus, 1758), (TMNP MPA).
- Cape anchovy, Engraulis japonicus Temminck & Schlegel, 1846 (Walvis Bay to Mozambique and Indo-Pacific)

===== Order Elopiformes =====
Family Elopidae – ladyfishes

- Atlantic ladyfish, Elops lacerta Valenciennes, 1846 (Atlantic coast to 23°S)

===== Order Eupercaria incertae sedis =====
Family: Callanthiidae – goldies

- Goldie, Callanthias legras Smith, 1947 (Dassen Island (Western Cape) to Natal)

Family: Emmelichthyidae – rovers

- Southern rover, Emmelichthys nitidus nitidus Richardson 1845 (occasionally taken off western Cape coast)

Family: Haemulidae – rubberlips and grunters

- Spotted grunter, Pomadasys commersonnii (Lacepède, 1801) (False Bay to India)
- Olive grunt, piggy, Pomadasys olivaceus (Day, 1875), (TMNP MPA).(Tropical and temperate Indian Ocean from False Bay to Oman and Somalia)

Family: Malacanthidae – tilefishes

- Forktail tilefish, Hoplolatilus fronticinctus (Günther, 1887) (Postlarvae collected off Cape Peninsula; India and Western Pacific)

Family: Monodactylidae – moonies

- Cape moony, Monodactylus falciformis Lacepède, 1801 (Red Sea to False Bay)

Family: Sciaenidae – kobs

- Argyrosomus inodorus Griffiths & Heemstra, 1995, (TMNP MPA).
- Kob, giant kob or kabeljou, Argyrosomus japonicus (Temminck & Schlegel, 1843) (Namibia to Natal) previously misidentified as Argyrosomus hololepidotus (Lacepède, 1801)
- Geelbek, African weakfish, Cape salmon, Atractoscion aequidens (Cuvier, 1830) (Angola to northern KwaZulu-Natal)
- Baardman or belman, Canary drum, Umbrina canariensis Valenciennes, 1843 (Morocco to the Cape of Good Hope through to Pakistan)
- Slender baardman, Umbrina ronchus Valenciennes, 1843, also reported as syn. Umbrina robinsoni Gilchrist & Thompson, 1908, (TMNP MPA).

Family: Sparidae – seabreams

- Carpenter, Argyrozona argyrozona (Valenciennes, 1830) (Cape Columbine to central KwaZulu-Natal)
- Fransmadam, Karel grootoog, Boopsoidea inornata Castelnau, 1861 (Cape Columbine to central KwaZulu-Natal)
- Santer,Cheimerius nufar (Valenciennes, 1830), (TMNP MPA).
- Dageraad, Chrysoblephus cristiceps (Valenciennes, 1830) (Cape Point to Durban)
- Red stumpnose or Miss Lucy, Chrysoblephus gibbiceps (Valenciennes, 1830) (Cape Point to East London)
- Roman, Chrysoblephus laticeps (Valenciennes, 1830) (Cape Point to southern KwaZulu-Natal)(Cape to Mauritius)
- Poenskop or black musselcracker, Cymatoceps nasutus (Castelnau, 1861) (Cape Columbine to Durban)
- Blacktail, Diplodus capensis (Smith, 1844) (Angola to Madagascar) also recorded as syn. Diplodus sargus capensis (Smith, 1844).
- Zebra, Diplodus hottentotus (Smith, 1844), also recorded as syn. Diplodus cervinus hottentotus (Smith, 1844) (Cape Point to Sodwana Bay)
- Janbruin, John Brown, Gymnocrotaphus curvidens Günther, 1859 (Cape Point to Durban)
- West coast steenbras, Lithognathus aureti Smith, 1962 (West coast; Cape Town to Angola)
- White steenbras, Lithognathus lithognathus (Cuvier, 1829) (Orange River to Durban)
- Sand steenbras, striped seabream, Lithognathus mormyrus (Linnaeus, 1758)(Mediterranean to the Cape of Good Hope and round to Mozambique)
- Blue hottentot, Pachymetopon aeneum (Gilchrist & Thompson, 1908) (Cape Point to Sodwana Bay)
- Hottentot, Pachymetopon blochii (Valenciennes, 1830) (Angola to Cape Agulhas)
- Bronze bream, Pachymetopon grande Günther, 1859, (TMNP MPA).
- Red steenbras, Petrus rupestris (Valenciennes, 1830) (Cape Point to Durban)
- Seventy-four seabream, Polysteganus undulosus (Regan, 1908), (TMNP MPA).
- Panga, Pterogymnus laniarius (Valenciennes, 1830) (Cape Point to Transkei)(Cape to Beira)
- White stumpnose, Rhabdosargus globiceps (Valenciennes, 1830) (Namibia to East London)(Angola to Natal)
- Cape stumpnose, Rhabdosargus holubi (Steindachner, 1881), (TMNP MPA).
- Strepie, karanteen, Sarpa salpa (Linnaeus, 1758) (Cape Columbine to Maputo)(Mediterranean and eastern Atlantic round South Africa to southern Mozambique)
- Musselcracker, Sparodon durbanensis (Castelnau, 1861) (Cape Columbine to Durban)
- Windtoy, Spicara axillare (Boulanger, 1900) (Known only from Cape Town to Natal)
- Steentjie, Spondyliosoma emarginatum (Valenciennes, 1830) (Saldanha Bay to Durban)

===== Order Gadiformes =====
Family: Bregmacerotidae – codlets

- Antenna codlet, Bregmaceros atlanticus Goode and Bean, 1886 (off south Cape and Natal coasts; circumtropical)
- Spotted codlet, Bregmaceros mcclellandi Thompson, 1840 (from Cape eastwards; circumtropical but not known from east Pacific)
- Bregmaceros nectabanus Whitley, 1941 (Cape eastwards to tropical Indo-West Pacific; Tropical eastern Atlantic)

Family Gadidae – cods

- Cape rockling, Gaidropsarus capensis (Kaup, 1858) (Cape Town to East London)
- Comb rockling, Gaidropsaris insularum Sivertsen, 1945 (Cape Peninsula and West coast)

Family Macrouridae – grenadiers

- Bathygadus favosus Goode and Bean, 1886 (off Cape Town)
- Bathygadus melanobranchus Vaillant, 1888 (Table Bay and Natal coast. Unverified, specimens missing)
- Surgeon grenadier, Coelorhinchus acanthiger Barnard, 1925 (off Namibia to Cape Point)
- Shovelnose grenadier, Coelorhinchus braueri Barnard, 1925 (Saldanha and Table Bay, Cape Point, East London; Angola to Mozambique)
- Abyssal grenadier, armoured rat-tail, russet grenadier, smoothscale rattail, Coryphaenoides armatus (Hector, 1875) (abyssal, all oceans except Arctic. One Atlantic record off South Africa)
- Coryphaenoides striaturus Barnard, 1925 (off Cape Point)
- Gadomus capensis, (Gilchrist and von Bonde, 1924) (Table Bay to Mozambique)
- Kuronezumia leonis (Barnard, 1925), syn. Nezumia leonis (off Cape Point, Namibia, southwestern Atlantic)
- Softhead grenadier, softhead rat-tail, Malacocephalus laevis (Lowe, 1843) (off South Africa; widespread in Atlantic and Indian oceans)
- Nezumia brevibarbata (Barnard, 1925) (Cape Point; known only off the Cape, where it is common)
- Roughsnout grenadier, roughsnout rat-tail, Trachyrincus scabrus (Rafinesque, 1810) (Namibia, west coast of South Africa; eastern North Atlantic and Mediterranean sea)

Family Melanonidae – melanonids

- Pelagic cod, Melanonus gracilis Günther, 1878 (circum-Antarctic south of Subtropical convergence; off Cape Peninsula)

Family Merlucciidae – hakes

- Lyconodes argenteus (Gilchrist, 1922) (west of Cape of Good Hope)
- Cape hake, shallow water hake, stockfish, South African whiting, Merluccius capensis Castelnau, 1861 (Namibia to East London)
- Deep water hake, deep-water Cape hake, Merluccius paradoxus Franca, 1960 (Cape Frio to East London)

Family Moridae – deepsea cods

- Blackcod, blue antimora, blue hake, Antimora rostrata (Günther, 1878) (locally abundant, found in most oceans)
- Guttigadus globiceps (Gilchrist, 1906), syn. Laemonema globiceps (off south-western Cape coast)
- Lepidion capensis Gilchrist, 1922 (Cape to East London)
- Physiculus capensis Gilchrist, 1922 (Cape Peninsula to East London)
- Tripterophycis gilchristi Boulenger, 1902 (upper slope off the Cape and Durban)

===== Order Gobiesociformes =====
Family Gobiesocidae – clingfishes

- Chubby clingfish, Apletodon pellegrini (Chabanaud, 1925) (Senegal (west Africa) to Port Alfred)
- Rocksucker, Chorisochismus dentex (Pallas, 1769) (Port Nolloth to northern KwaZulu-Natal)
- Bigeye clingfish, Diplecogaster megalops Briggs, 1955 (False Bay to Durban)
- Weedsucker, Eckloniaichthys scylliorhiniceps Smith, 1943 (Lüderitz to Kei River mouth)

===== Order Gobiiformes =====
Family: Gobiidae – gobies

Subfamily Gobiinae

- Agulhas goby, Caffrogobius agulhensis (Barnard, 1927) (False Bay to East London)
- Banded goby, Caffrogobius caffer (Günther, 1874) (Natal to False Bay)
- Prison goby, Caffrogobius gilchristi (Boulenger, 1898) (Table Bay to Mozambique Island)(syn. Caffrogobius multifasciatus)
- Barehead goby, Caffrogobius nudiceps (Valenciennes, 1827) (Walvis Bay to East London)
- Commafin goby, Caffrogobius saldanha (Barnard, 1927) (Saldanha Bay to southern Transkei)
- Knysna sandgoby, Psammogobius knysnaensis Smith, 1935 (Port Nolloth to northern KwaZulu-Natal)
- Pelagic goby, Sufflogobius bibarbatus (von Bonde, 1923) (Port Nolloth to Saldanha Bay)

===== Order Gonorynchiformes =====
Family Gonorynchidae – beaked sandfish

- Beaked sandfish, Gonorynchus gonorynchus (Linnaeus 1766) (Cape of Good Hope)

===== Order Lampriformes =====
Family Lampridae – opahs

- Spotted opah, Jerusalem haddock, moonfish, Lampris guttatus (Brünnich, 1788) (all oceans but not in polar waters, occurs throughout South African waters, usually well offshore)
- Southern opah, Lampris immaculatus Gilchrist, 1904 (circumglobal south of 30°S)

Family Lophotidae – crestfishes

- Unicorn crestfish, Eumecichthys fiski (Günther, 1890) (1 specimen, Kalk Bay in False Bay)
- Crestfish, Lophotus lacepede Giorna, 1809 (Cape to Plettenberg Bay, rare but widely distributed in all oceans)

Family Radiicephalidae – tapertails

- Tapertail, Radiicephalus elongatus Osorio, 1917 (70 miles SW of Cape Point)

Family Regalecidae – oarfishes

- Streamer fish, Agrostichthys parkeri (Benham 1904) (southeast Atlantic, New Zealand and Tasmania)
- Oarfish, Regalecus glesne Ascanius, 1772 (worldwide distribution)

Family Trachipteridae – ribbonfishes

- Polka-dot ribbonfish, Desmodema polystictum (Ogilby, 1897) (1 juvenile washed ashore at Xora river and 1 found at Simon's Town, False Bay)
- Blacktail ribbonfish, Trachipterus jacksonensis (Ramsay, 1881) (East London and off Cape Town)
- Peregrine ribbonfish, Trachipterus trachypterus (Gmelin, 1789) (off Table Bay)
- Taper tail ribbonfish, Zu elongatus (Heemstra and Kannemeyer, 1984) (4 specimens trawled off the western Cape coast)

Family Ceratiidae – seadevils

- Deepsea angler, twoclub angler, Ceratias holboelli Krøyer, 1845 (single specimen off Cape Town at 34°12'S, 16°35'E; nearly cosmopolitan in the world's oceans)
- Ceratias tentaculatus (Norman, 1930) (off Saldanha Bay, off southern Natal, off Delagoa Bay and throughout southern oceans)
- Triplewart seadevil, Cryptopsaras couesii Gill, 1883 (off Cape of Good Hope, all major oceans)

Family Himantolophidae – footballfish

- Atlantic footballfish, Himantolophus groenlandicus Reinhardt, 1837 (all major oceans)

Family Melanocetidae – devil-anglers

- Melanocetus johnsonii Günther, 1864 (off all coasts of South Africa; all major oceans)

===== Order Lophiiformes =====
Family Antennariidae – anglers

- Sargassum fish, Histrio histrio (Linnaeus, 1758) (Cape Point to Mozambique)

Family Lophiidae – monks

- Blackmouth angler, Lophiomus setigerus (Vahl, 1797) (Indo-West Pacific south to False Bay)
- Monkfish, devil anglerfish, Lophius vomerinus (Valenciennes, 1837), syn. Lophius upsicephalus (off Cape of Good Hope; eastern South Atlantic and south western Indian Ocean off South Africa; Bay of Bengal off Burma) also recorded as Lophius sp.

===== Order Mugiliformes =====
Family Mugilidae

- Groovy mullet, Chelon dumerili (Steindachner, 1870), (TMNP MPA).
- Flathead mullet, Mugil cephalus Linnaeus, 1758, (TMNP MPA).
- Harder, Chelon richardsonii (Smith, 1846), also recorded as syn. Liza richardsonii (Smith, 1846), (TMNP MPA).
- Striped mullet, Chelon tricuspidens (Smith, 1935), (TMNP MPA).

===== Order Myctophiformes =====
Family Myctophidae – lanternfishes

- Bolinichthys supralateralis (Parr, 1928) (off Cape Peninsula and in Agulgas current; Atlantic (40°N – 02°S and 32° to 40°S); Indian Ocean (21° – 30°S); west coast of Australia and near Hawaii)
- Diaphus effulgens (Goode and Bean, 1896) (off all SA coasts)
- Diaphus mollis Tåning, 1928 (off all SA coasts, broadly tropical distribution in all major oceans)
- Diaphus taaningi Norman, 1930 (over west coast continental shelf/slope southward to 24°S. Amphitropical species in Atlantic (western sector); tropical waters to 42°N; eastern sector: southward from Mauretanian upwelling region to South African region)
- Electrona risso (Cocco, 1829) (off east and west coasts of South Africa. Widespread in Atlantic (55°N – 40°S), Mediterranean, Indian Ocean (0° – 40°S), Tasman sea and Cook Strait, and eastern Pacific (42°N – 20°S))
- Gonichthys barnesi Whitley, 1943 (off east and west coasts, south of 30°S. Convergence species in all 3 oceans (30° – 40°S))
- Gymnoscopelus braueri (Lönnberg, 1905) (circumglobal between Subtropical convergence and Antarctica)
- Hygophum hanseni (Tåning, 1932) (from 30°S on west coast to 33°S on east coast. Convergence species (30° to 43°S) in all 3 oceans)
- Hygophum hygomii (Lütken, 1892) (west of Cape Peninsula and off east coast (25° – 37°S))
- Hygophum proximum Bekker, 1965) (south to about 37°S in Agulhas current; Indian Ocean (25°N – 10°S))
- Lampadena notialis Nafpaktitis and Paxton, 1968 (Off east coast and Cape Peninsula; convergence species in all 3 oceans)
- Mirror lampfish, mirror lanternfish, Lampadena speculigera Goode and Bean, 1896 (off west and southeast coasts. Atlantic (66° – 35°N and 35° – 45°S), Indian Ocean (30° to 45°S) and Pacific Ocean (30° – 45°S))
- Hector's lanternfish, Lampanyctodes hectoris (Günther, 1876), (TMNP MPA).
- Lampanyctus alatus Goode and Bean, 1896 (off all South African coasts; Atlantic (46°N – 38°S), Indian Ocean (0° – 39°S)
- Southern lanternfish, Lampanyctus australis Tåning, 1932 (off all South African coasts; circumglobal convergence species (33° – 43°S with northern extension to about 27°S in eastern boundary currents))
- Lampanyctus festivus Tåning, 1928 (off all South African coasts. Atlantic(53° – 18°N and 28° – 40°S with northern extension to 12°S in Benguela current and Indo-West Pacific.)
- Lampanyctus lepidolychnus Bekker, 1967 (off all South African coasts, circumglobal convergence species (23° – 48°S))
- Rakery beaconlamp, Lampanyctus macdonaldi (Goode and Bean, 1896) (west of Cape Peninsula, circumglobal between subtropical convergence and Antarctic polar front)
- Lampanyctus pusillus (Johnson, 1890) (off all South African coasts. Bisubtropical species in all major oceans)
- Lampichthys procerus (Brauer, 1904) (off Cape Peninsula, circumglobal convergence species (32° – 48°S) with extensions into lower latitudes in eastern boundary currents)
- Lobianchia dofleini (Zugmayer, 1911) (off all South African coasts. Mediterranean, Atlantic (50°N – 40°S), Indian Ocean (23° – 38°S), Tasman sea and south Pacific(region of subtropical convergence))
- Lobianchia gemellarii (Cocco, 1838) (off all South African coasts, worldwide in tropical/subtropical waters)
- Metelectrona ventralis (Bekker, 1063) (west of Cape Peninsula in southern Benguela upwelling region; circumglobal subantarctic species (36°-51°S))
- Myctophum phengodes (Lütken, 1892) (off all South African coasts)
- Myctophum selenops Tåning, 1928 (west of Cape peninsula in Agulhas water pockets)
- Nannobrachium atrum (Tåning, 1928), syn. Lampanyctus ater (off all South African coasts; Atlantic (58° – 17°N and 15° – 40°S) and Indian Ocean (12° – 44°S))
- Notolychnus valdiviae (Brauer, 1904) (off all South African coasts)
- Patchwork lampfish, Notoscopelus resplendens (Richardson, 1845) (off all South African coasts)
- Protomyctophum normani Tåning, 1932 (once west of Slangkop lighthouse; circumglobal convergence species (36° – 43°S))
- Scopelopsis multipunctatus Brauer, 1906 (off all South African coasts)
- Symbolophorus barnardi (Tåning, 1932) (off all South African coasts)

===== Order Notacanthiformes =====
Family Halosauridae – halosaurs

- Gilbert's halosaurid, Aldrovandia affinis (Günther, 1877) (both coasts of SA; cicumglobal tropical and temperate)
- Hawaiian halosaurid, Aldrovandia phalacra (Vaillant, 1888) (off Cape Point)
- Abyssal halosaur, Halosauropsis macrochir (Günther, 1878) (off Cape Point)
- Halosaurus ovenii Johnson, 1863 (off Cape Point to Walvis Bay)

Family Notacanthidae – spiny eels

- Notacanthus sexspinis Richardson, 1846 (Walvis Bay to Durban)
- Polyacanthonotus africanus (Gilchrist and von Bonde, 1924) (off Cape Point)
- Shortspine tapirfish, Polyacanthonotus rissoanus (De Filippi & Verany, 1857) (off Cape Point to Table Bay)

===== Order Ophidiiformes =====
Family Aphyonidae – aphyonids

- Barathronus bicolor? Goode and Bean, 1886 (off Cape Point, specimen lost, identification dubious)

Family Bythitidae – bythitids or brotulas

- Megacataetyx niki (Cohen, 1981), recorded as Cataetyx niki Cohen, 1981 (2 specimens from off the Cape)
- Lesser orange brotula, Dermatopsoides talboti Cohen, 1966 (Saldanha Bay to Algoa Bay)
- Bighead brotula, Grammonus opisthodon Smith, 1934, recorded as syn. Grammonoides opisthodon (Smith, 1934), (TMNP MPA).

Family Ophidiidae – cuskeels

- Slender brotula, Dicrolene multifilis (Alcock, 1889) (off Table Bay and east coast of South Africa)
- Kingklip, Genypterus capensis (Smith, 1847) (Walvis Bay to Algoa Bay)
- Penopus microphthalmus (Vaillant, 1888) (one specimen off the Cape)
- Slender cuskeel, Porogadus miles Goode and Bean, 1886 (one specimen off the Cape; relatively common both sides of the Atlantic; also recorded from Indian Ocean)
- Barbed brotula, Selachophidium guentheri Gilchrist, 1903 (Angola to Mozambique)

===== Order Osmeriformes =====
Family Alepocephalidae – slickheads

- Alepocephalus australis Barnard 1923 (off Cape Point; apparently widely distributed in temperate waters of southern hemisphere)
- Atlantic gymnast, English bluntsnout smoothhead, Xenodermichthys copei (Gill, 1884) (common off South Africa)

Family Opisthoproctidae – barreleyes

- Rhynchohyalus natalensis (Gilchrist and von Bonde, 1924) (off Cape Town to Bermuda)

Family Microstomatidae

- Nansenia macrolepis (Gilchrist, 1922) (west of Cape Peninsula; off Natal)

Family Bathylagidae

- Melanolagus bericoides (Borodin, 1929) recorded as syn. Bathylagus bericoides (Borodin, 1929) (off Cape Town, throughout tropical and subtropical seas)

===== Order Ovalentaria incertae sedis =====
Family: Pseudochromidae – dottybacks Subfamily: Congrogadinae – snakelets

- Snakelet, Halidesmus scapularis Günther, 1872 (Cape Columbine to Transkei)(False Bay to Coffee Bay)(TMNP MPA).

===== Order Perciformes =====
Suborder: Cottoidei

Family: Psychrolutidae – fatheads

- Cottunculus spinosus, Gilchrist, 1906 (off Cape Point)

Family: Liparidae – snailfishes

- Careproctus albescens Barnard, 1927 (off Cape Point)
- Paraliparis australis Gilchrist, 1904 (off Cape Point)
- Paraliparis copei Goode & Bean, 1896 (Northwest Atlantic, Azores and South Africa. off Cape Point)
- Psednos micrurus Barnard, 1927 recorded as Paraliparis micruris (Barnard, 1927) (Cape of Good Hope, southern Indian Ocean and South Pacific)

Suborder Percoidei

Suborder Serranoidei

Family: Serranidae – rockcods (groupers) and seabasses

Subfamily: Epinephelinae

- Yellowbelly rockcod, Epinephelus marginatus (Lowe, 1834) (Namibia to Mozambique) Formerly identified as Epinephelus guaza (Linnaeus, 1758)

Subfamily: Serraninae

- Koester, Acanthistius sebastoides (Castelnau, 1861) (Namibia to Mozambique)
- Comber, Serranus cabrilla (Linnaeus, 1758) recorded as syn. Serranus knysnaensis Gilchrist, 1904 (False Bay to Durban)

Suborder Scorpaenoidei

Family: Congiopodidae – horsefishes

- Spinenose horsefish, Congiopodus spinifer (Smith, 1839) (Walvis Bay to Natal)
- Smooth horsefish, Congiopodus torvus (Gronovius, 1772) (Namibia to Pondoland)(Walvis Bay to KZN)

Family: Scorpaenidae

- Bigscale scorpionfish, Scorpaena scrofa Linnaeus, 1758 (Algoa Bay to Natal)(False Bay to KZN)
- Tasselled scorpionfish, Scorpaenopsis oxycephalus (Bleeker, 1849), (TMNP MPA).

Family: Sebastidae

- Jacopever, Helicolenus dactylopterus (Delaroche, 1809) (Walvis Bay to Natal)
- False jacopever, Sebastes capensis (Gmelin, 1788) (Cape to Saldanha Bay)
- Cape scorpionfish, Trachyscorpia eschmeyeri Whitley, 1970, recorded as syn. Trachyscorpia capensis] (Gilchrist & von Bonde, 1924), (Cape to St Helena Bay)

Family: Tetrarogidae – waspfishes

- Smoothskin scorpionfish, Coccotropsis gymnoderma (Gilchrist, 1906) (Cape to Algoa bay)(Cape Peninsula to Algoa Bay)

Family: Triglidae – gurnards

- Cape gurnard, Chelidonichthys capensis (Cuvier, 1829) (Cape Fria to Maputo)
- Bluefin gurnard, Chelidonichthys kumu (Cuvier, 1829) (Cape Point to Delagoa Bay)(West coast of Cape Peninsula to Algoa Bay, also Indo-west Pacific)
- Lesser gurnard, Chelidonichthys queketti (Regan, 1904) (Table Bay to Natal)

Suborder: Uranoscopoidei

Family: Ammodytidae – Sandlances

- Cape sandlance, Gymnammodytes capensis (Barnard, 1927) (Angola to Delagoa Bay)

Family: Uranoscopidae – Stargazers

- Spotted stargazer, Pleuroscopus pseudodorsalis Barnard, 1927 (off Table Bay and Algoa Bay)

Suborder: Zoarcoidei

Family: Zoarcidae – Eelpouts

- Lycodes agulhensis Andriashev, 1959 (Cap Blanc, Mauretania to Agulhas Bank)
- Lycodonus vermiformis Barnard, 1927 (off Cape Point)
- Melanostigma gelatinosum Günther, 1881 (off Cape Town)

===== Order Pleuronectiformes =====
Family Cynoglossidae

- Sand tonguefish, Cynoglossus capensis (Kaup, 1858), (TMNP MPA).

Family Soleidae – soles

- East Coast sole, Austroglossus pectoralis (Kaup, 1858)
- Lemon sole, Barnardichthys fulvomarginata (Gilchrist, 1904), syn. Solea fulvomarginata Gilchrist, 1904, (False Bay and eastwards)
- Cape sole, Heteromycteris capensis Kaup, 1858, (Both sides of Cape Peninsula)
- Blackhand sole, Pegusa nasuta (Pallas, 1814), recorded as syn. Solea bleekeri Boulenger, 1898, (TMNP MPA).
- Lace sole, Synapturichthys kleinii (Risso, 1827), (Both sides of the Cape Peninsula)

===== Order Saccopharyngiformes =====
Family Cyematidae – arrow eels

- Cyema atrum Günther, 1878 (Off southwest coast)
- Bobtail snipe eel, Neocyema erythrosoma Castle, 1978 (west of Cape Town)

===== Order Scombriformes =====
Family: Ariommatidae

- Indian driftfish, Ariomma indica (Day, 1870) (Mossel Bay eastwards to Southern Japan)

Family: Bramidae – pomfrets

- Pomfret, Brama brama (Bonnaterre, 1788) (Algoa Bay to Walvis Bay)
- Prickly fanfish, Pterycombus petersii (Hilgendorff, 1878) (Mid Pacific to Africa, south round the Cape of good Hope to Cape Town)
- Sickle pomfret, Taractichthys steindachneri (Döderlein, 1883) (Indo-Pacific from California to Zanzibar and south to False Bay)

Family: Caristiidae

- Manefish, Caristius fasciatus (Borodin, 1930), (TMNP MPS).

Family: Centrolophidae – Ruffs

- Black ruff, Centrolophus niger (Gmelin, 1789) (Temperate waters of Australia, New Zealand, South America and South Africa, also North Atlantic and Mediterranean)
- Antarctic butterfish, Hyperoglyphe antarctica (Carmichael, 1818) (Temperate waters; islands of south Atlantic and southern Indian oceans; New Zealand, southern Australia and South Africa)
- Schedophilus huttoni (Waite, 1910) (Circumglobal in southern ocean, taken off Cape Town, common off Namibia)
- Black butterfish or peregrine driftfish, Schedophilus velaini (Sauvage, 1879) (Gulf of Guinea, to South Africa)(syn. Hyperoglyphe moselii (Cunningham, 1910))
- Flabby driftfish, Tubbia tasmanica Whitley, 1943 (Temperate waters of Southern Ocean; New Zealand, Tasmania and South Africa off Natal)

Family: Chiasmodontidae – Swallowers

- Chiasmodon niger Johnson, 1863 (Tropical/subtropical in the three major oceans)
- Kali macrodon (Norman, 1929) (Tropical/subtropical in the three major oceans, taken off Cape Town and Natal)

Family: Gempylidae – snake mackerels

- Snake mackerel, Gempylus serpens Cuvier, 1829 (Worldwide in tropical and subtropical waters, sometimes in temperate latitudes)
- Escolar, Lepidocybium flavobrunneum (Smith, 1849) (Tropical and subtropical waters of all oceans)
- Sackfish, Neoepinnula orientalis (Gilchrist & von Bonde, 1924) (All oceans near edge of continental shelf and islands)
- Oilfish, Ruvettus pretiosus Cocco, 1879 (Tropical and temperate parts of all oceans)
- Snoek, Thyrsites atun (Euphrasen, 1791) (Namibia to Port Elizabeth)

Family: Nomeidae – Driftfishes

- Black fathead, Cubiceps baxteri McCulloch, 1923 (Atlantic, Pacific and Indian Oceans)
- Blue fathead, Cubiceps caeruleus Regan, 1914 (Southern Atlantic and Pacific Oceans)
- Cape fathead, Cubiceps capensis (Smith, 1845) (Probably circumglobal in southern hemisphere)
- Longfin fathead, Cubiceps pauciradiatus Günther, 1872 (Atlantic, Pacific and Indian Oceans)
- Bluebottle fish, Nomeus gronovii Gmelin, 1789 (Circumglobal in warm waters)
- Banded driftfish, Psenes arafurensis Günther, 1889 (Atlantic, Pacific and Indian Ocean)
- Freckled driftfish, Psenes cyanophrys Valenciennes, 1883 (Atlantic, Pacific and Indian Oceans)
- Silver driftfish, Psenes maculatus Lütken, 1880 (Atlantic, Pacific and Indian Oceans)
- Blackrag, Psenes pellucidus Lütken, 1880 (Atlantic, Pacific and Indian Oceans)
- Shadow driftfish, Cubiceps whiteleggii (Waite, 1894) Psenes whiteleggi Waite, 1894 (Indian Ocean and Australia)

Family: Pomatomidae – elf

- Elf or shad, Pomatomus saltatrix (Linnaeus, 1766)(Namibia to Maputo)

Family: Scombridae – tunas, mackerels and bonitos

Subfamily: Gasterochismatinae

- Bigscale mackerel, Gasterochisma melampus Richardson, 1845 (Worldwide in southern ocean, mostly between 35° and 50° S, recorded from Table Bay)

Subfamily: Scombrinae

- Wahoo, Acanthocybium solandri (Cuvier, 1831) (Worldwide in tropical and subtropical waters. From South Africa: Algoa Bay, off Durban, and Sodwana Bay. one record west of Cape Point)
- Slender tuna, Allothunnus fallai Serventy, 1948 (Worldwide between 20° and 50° S. From South Africa: Miller's Point and Rooikrans in False Bay)
- Bullet tuna, Auxis rochei Risso, 1810 (Cosmopolitan in warm waters. From South Africa: Hout Bay, Mossel Bay and Natal)
- Frigate tuna, Auxis thazard (Lacepède, 1800)
- Skipjack tuna, Katsuwonus pelamis (Linnaeus, 1758) (False Bay, Algoa Bay to Delagoa Bay)
- Atlantic bonito, Sarda sarda (Bloch, 1793), (TMNP MPA).
- Mackerel, chub mackerel, Scomber japonicus Houttuyn, 1782 (Namibia to Maputo)(Cape to Natal, cosmopolitan in warm waters)
- Albacore or longfin tunny, Thunnus alalunga (Bonnaterre, 1788) (Off Western Cape, Cosmopolitan between 45°-50°N and 30°-40°S)
- Yellowfin tuna, Thunnus albacares (Bonnaterre, 1788) (Angola to Natal)
- Southern bluefin tuna, Thunnus maccoyii (Castelnau, 1872) (Off Cape region in winter, probably throughout southern oceans south of 30°S)
- Bigeye tuna, Thunnus obesus (Lowe, 1839) (Off Cape region, Worldwide in tropical and subtropical waters)
- Bluefin tuna, Thunnus thynnus (Linnaeus, 1758) (Agulhas Bank and False Bay)

Family: Stromateidae

- Blue butterfish, Stromateus fiatola Linnaeus, 1758 (Eastern Atlantic and Mediterranean round the Cape to Natal)

Family: Tetragonuridae – Squaretails

- Bigeye squaretail, Tetragonurus atlanticus Lowe, 1839 (Atlantic Pacific and Indian oceans)

Family: Trichiuridae – frostfishes

- Buttersnoek, Lepidopus caudatus (Euphrasen, 1788) (Mediterranean, eastern Atlantic from Norway to South Africa, Australia and new Zealand)
- Cutlass fish, Trichiurus lepturus Linnaeus, 1758 (Cosmopolitan in tropical and temperate waters)

===== Order Siluriformes – catfishes =====
Family Ariidae – sea catfishes

- Black seacatfish, Galeichthys ater Castelnau, 1861 (south coast to Port Alfred)
- White seacatfish, Galeichthys feliceps Valenciennes, 1840 (Walvis Bay to Natal)

===== Order Stomiiformes =====
Family Gonostomatidae – bristlemouths

- Cyclothone acclinidens Garman, 1899 (off Cape Point; tropical/subtropical in all 3 major oceans)
- Veiled anglemouth, Cyclothone microdon (Günther, 1878) (Saldanha Bay to Mossel Bay; all 3 major oceans)
- Bicolored bristlemouth, tan bristlemouth Cyclothone pallida Brauer, 1902 (all 3 major oceans)
- Diplophos rebainsi Krefft and Parin, 1972 (off south western Cape coast; southern Atlantic and south-eastern Pacific Oceans)
- Diplophos taenia Günther, 1873 (all 3 major oceans; all around SA coast)
- Gonostoma denudatum Rafineque, 1810 (Temperate/subtropical Atlantic; off southern Africa to ca. 37°S)
- Sigmops bathyphilus (Vaillant, 1884), syn. Gonostoma bathyphilum (off Cape Point; temperate/subtropical Atlantic and Pacific oceans)

Family Phosichthyidae – lightfishes

- Ichthyococcus australis Mukhacheva, 1980 (circumglobal in subtropical convergence region of southern hemisphere with records between 30° and 40°S in Atlantic sector of our region)
- Slender lightfish Vinciguerria attenuata (Cocco, 1838) (off Cape Point; all 3 major oceans)

Family Sternoptychidae – hatchetfishes

- Muller's pearlsides, Maurolicus muelleri (Gmelin, 1788) (all oceans, more common in colder regions)
- Lightfish, Maurolicus walvisensis Parin & Kobyliansky, 1993, (TMNP MPA).
- Valenciennellus tripunctulatus (Esmark, 1871), syn. Valenciennellus tripunctatus (all oceans, tropical, subtropical and temperate waters)
- Atlantic silver hatchetfish, longspine silver hatchetfish, Argyropelecus aculeatus Valenciennes, 1849 (worldwide in tropical and temperate seas)
- Greater silver hatchetfish, Argyropelecus gigas Norman, 1930 (southeast of Cape of Good Hope; Indian Ocean to 40°S and south Atlantic to 38°S)
- Short silver hatchetfishArgyropelecus hemigymnus Cocco, 1829 (worldwide distribution, common in SA waters to 35°S)
- Transparent hatchetfish, Sternoptyx diaphana Hermann, 1781 (worldwide in tropical and temperate seas)
- Sternoptyx pseudodiaphana Borodulina, 1977 (Indian Ocean south of 35°S; circumglobal in Southern Ocean; Benguela current)

Family: Stomiidae

- Astronesthes boulengeri Gilchrist, 1902 (southeast of Cape Point, circumpolar between 30° and 40°S)
- Astronesthes indicus Brauer, 1902 (circumglobal in tropical waters, taken between 33° and 35°S on Atlantic side)
- Bathophilus digitatus (Welsh, 1923) (single specimen from off Cape Town; North Atlantic, Indian and Pacific oceans)
- Bathophilus longipinnis (Pappenheim, 1914) (off Cape Town; occurs widely in all 3 major oceans)
- Bathophilus nigerrimus Giglioli, 1884 (off Cape Town and off Port Elizabeth to Mozambique Channel)
- Chauliodus sloani Bloch and Schneider, 1801 (offshore throughout southern Africa)
- Echiostoma barbatum Lowe, 1843 (off Cape Town, southeast of Algoa Bay; widespread in tropical/subtropical waters of all oceans)
- Eustomias bulbornatus Gibbs, 1960 (south and west of Cape of Good Hope; tropical Indian and Pacific oceans)
- Eustomias filifer (Gilchrist, 1906) (off Cape Point; tropical and subtropical Atlantic)
- Eustomias grandibulbus Gibbs, Clarke and Gomon, 1983 (off Cape Town)
- Eustomias lipochirus Regan and Trewavas, 1930 (2 specimens from south west of Cape of Good Hope; Tropical/subtropical Atlantic)
- Eustomias schmidti Regan and Trewavas, 1930 (off Cape Town; occurs widely in all 3 major oceans)
- Eustomias trewavasae Norman, 1930 (circumglobal between about 33° and 40°S)
- Leptostomias gladiator (Zugmayer, 1911) (tropical, subtropical and temperate Atlantic, also Indian and Pacific oceans)
- Melanostomias niger Gilchrist and von Bonde, 1924 (widespread in Atlantic between 20° and 50°S)
- Melanostomias valdiviae Brauer, 1902 (off Cape Town and northeast of Durban; all 3 major oceans)
- Opostomias micripnus (Günther, 1878) (northwest of Cape Town; occurs across the Atlantic, Pacific and possibly Indian Ocean south of about 33°S) (syn. Opostomias gibsonpacei Barnard, 1948)
- Pachystomias microdon (Günther, 1878) (off Western Cape coast; widespread in all 3 major oceans)(Günther, 1878)
- Photonectes braueri (Zugmayer, 1913) (off Cape Town; Atlantic and western Indian Ocean)
- Photonectes parvimanus Regan and Trewavas, 1930 (off west coast; north Atlantic and central Pacific)
- Trigonolampa miriceps Regan and Trewavas, 1930 (off west coast; apparently circumglobal in Southern Ocean south of 30°S)
- Boa dragonfish, scaly dragonfish, Stomias boa boa (Risso, 1810) (offshore throughout southern Africa)
- Stomias longibarbatus (Brauer, 1902), syn. Macrostomias longibarbatus (taken once off Cape of Good Hope, widespread in subtropical and tropical Atlantic and tropical Indian and Pacific oceans)

===== Order Syngnathiformes =====
Family Centriscidae – snipefishes and shrimpfishes

- Banded snipefish, Centriscops humerosus (Richardson, 1846) recorded as syn. Centriscops obliquus Waite, 1911 (Cape Columbine to False Bay)
- Slender snipefish, Macroramphosus scolopax (Linnaeus, 1758) (Table Bay to Durban)

Family Fistulariidae – flutemouths

- Serrate flutemouth, Fistularia petimba Lacepède, 1803 (Atlantic, Indian and western Pacific oceans; east coast of Africa south to Mossel Bay; also reported from Walvis Bay and False Bay)

Family Syngnathidae – seahorses and pipefishes

- Longsnout pipefish, Syngnathus temminckii Kaup, 1856 (Namibia to northern KwaZulu-Natal)

===== Order Tetraodontiformes =====
Family Diodontidae

- Birdbeak burrfish, Cyclichthys orbicularis (Bloch, 1785), (TMNP MPA).
- Balloon porcupinefish, long-spine porcupinefishDiodon holocanthus Linnaeus, 1758, (TMNP MPA).

Family Molidae

- Trunk fish, slender sunfish, Ranzania laevis (Pennant, 1776), (TMNP MPA).
- Ocean sunfish, Mola mola (Linnaeus, 1758), (TMNP MPA).

Family Ostraciidae

- Backspine cowfish, thornback cowfish, Lactoria fornasini (Bianconi, 1846), (TMNP MPA).

Family Tetraodontidae – puffers

- Evil-eye blaasop, Amblyrhynchotes honckenii (Bloch, 1785)(False Bay to Delagoa Bay, Indo-West Pacific)

===== Order Zeiformes =====
Family Oreosomatidae

- Ox-eyed oreo, Oreosoma atlanticum Cuvier, 1829, (TMNP MPA).

Family Zeidae

- Atlantic John Dory Zeus faber Linnaeus, 1758, (TMNP MPA).

== Reptiles ==
Mostly vagrant turtles and the occasional sea snake.

Family Dermochelyidae

- Leatherback sea turtle, Dermochelys coriacea (Vandelli, 1761).

Family Cheloniidae

- Loggerhead sea turtles, Caretta caretta (Linnaeus, 1758).

Family Elapidae

- Yellow-bellied sea snake, Hydrophis platurus (Linnaeus, 1766).

== Birds ==
As of 2022, 39 species of seabirds and shorebirds are known to use the marine protected area.

12 species of seabird nest in the TMNP MPA, six of these are endemic to the region. Four of the endemics are listed as endangered, one is near threatened, and one is of least concern.

=== Order Charadriiformes ===
Family: Charadriidae

- African oystercatcher, Haemotopus moquini (Bonaparte, 1856) (Lüderitz, Namibia to Mazeppa Bay, Eastern Cape, South Africa)
- Black oystercatcher, Haematopus bachmani (TMNP MPA).
- Grey plover, black-bellied plover, Pluvialis squatarola (Linnaeus, 1758), (TMN MPA).
- White-fronted plover, Charadrius marginatus Vieillot, 1818, (TMNP MPA),

Family Laridae

- Caspian tern, Hydroprogne caspia (Pallas, 1770), (TMNP MPA).
- Grey-headed gull Larus cirrocephalus Vieillot, 1818, (TMNP MPA).
- Southern African kelp gull, Larus dominicanus Lichtenstein, 1823, recorded as Larus dominicanus vetula, (TMNP MPA).
- Hartlaub's gull Larus hartlaubii Bruch, 1853, Least concern, breeding colonies.
- Greater crested tern, swift tern, Sterna bergii Lichtenstein, 1823, recorded as syn. Thalasseus bergii (Lichtenstein, 1823), (TMNP MPA).
- Common tern, Sterna hirundo Linnaeus, 1758. (TMNP MPA).
- Sandwich tern Sterna sandvicensis Latham, 1787, recorded as syn. Thalasseus sandvicensis (Latham, 1787), (TMNP MPA).
- Antarctic tern, Sterna vittata Gmelin, 1789, (TMNP MPA).
- Damara tern, Sternula balaenarum (Strickland, 1852), (TMNP MPA).
- Sabine's gull, Xema sabini (Sabine, 1819), (TMNP MPA).

Family Scolopacidae

- Ruddy turnstone, Arenaria interpres (Linnaeus, 1758), (TMNP MPA).
- Sanderling Calidris alba (Pallas, 1764), (TMNP MPA).
- Red knot, Calidris canutus (Linnaeus, 1758), (TMNP MPA).
- Bar-tailed godwit, Limosa lapponica (Linnaeus, 1758), (TMNP MPA).
- Whimbrel, Numenius phaeopus (Linnaeus, 1758), (TMNP MPA).

Family Stercorariidae

- Brown skua, Stercorarius antarcticus (Lesson, 1831), (TMNP MPA).

=== Order Ciconiiformes ===
Family Ardeidae

- Grey heron Ardea cinerea Linnaeus, 1758, (TMNP MPA).
- Little egret Egretta garzetta (Linnaeus, 1766), (TMNP MPA).
- Intermediate egret Egretta intermedia (Wagler, 1829), (TMNP MPA).

=== Order Pelecaniformes ===
Family Anhingidae

- African darter Anhinga rufa (Daudin, 1802), (TMNP MPA).

Family Pelecanidae

- Great white pelican, Pelecanus onocrotalus Linnaeus, 1758, (TMNP MPA).

Family Threskiornithidae

- African sacred ibis, Threskiornis aethiopicus (Latham, 1790), (TMNP MPA).

=== Order Phoenicopteriformes ===
Family Phoenicopteridae

- Greater flamingo, Phoenicopterus ruber Linnaeus, 1758, recorded as syn. Phoenicopterus roseus Pallas, 1811, (TMNP MPA).

=== Order Procellariiformes ===
Family Diomedeidae

- Indian yellow-nosed albatross, Thalassarche carteri (Rothschild, 1903), (TMNP MPA).
- Shy albatross, Thalassarche cauta (Gould, 1841), (TMNP MPA).
- Black-browed albatross, Thalassarche melanophris (Temminck, 1828), (TMNP MPA).

Family Procellaridae

- Pintado, Cape petrel, Daption capense (Linnaeus, 1758), (TMNP MPA).
- Southern giant petrel, Macronectes giganteus (Gmelin, 1789), (TMNP MPA).
- White-chinned petrel, Procellaria aequinoctialis Linnaeus, 1758, (TMNP MPA).
- Sooty shearwater, Puffinus griseus (Gmelin, 1789), (TMNP MPA).

Family Hydrobatidae

- Wilson's Storm-petrel, Oceanites oceanicus (Kuhl, 1820), (TMNP MPA).

=== Order Sphenisciformes – Penguins ===
Family: Spheniscidae

- Jackass penguin or African penguin, Spheniscus demersus (Linnaeus 1758),(Namibia to Algoa Bay), Endangered, with breeding colonies.

=== Order Suliformes ===
Family Sulidae – gannets and boobies

- Cape gannet, Morus capensis (Lichtenstein, 1823), (Breeding: three islands off Namibia and three islands off South Africa. Otherwise: coastal waters off the Gulf of Guinea to Mozambique) Endangered.

Family: Phalacrocoracidae – Cormorants

- Crowned cormorant, Microcarbo coronatus (Wahlberg, 1855), (Swakopmund to Cape Agulhas) Near threatened, with breeding colonies.
- Cape cormorant, Phalacrocorax capensis Sparrman, 1788, (Breeding: Namibia to southern Cape Province, Otherwise: Mouth of the Congo to Mozambique) Endangered, with breeding colonies.
- Great cormorant, white-breasted cormorant, Phalacrocorax carbo (Linnaeus, 1758), (TMNP MPA).
- Bank cormorant, Phalacrocorax neglectus (Wahlberg, 1855), (Namibia and the west coast of South Africa) Endangered, with breeding colonies.

== Mammals ==
=== Order Carnivora ===
Family Mustelidae – weasels and others

Subfamily Lutrinae – otters

- Cape clawless otter, African clawless otter Aonyx capensis (Schinz, 1821) (most of Africa with access to fresh water)

==== Infraorder Pinnipedia – seals ====
Family Otariidae – eared seals

- South African fur seal, brown fur seal, Arctocephalus pusillus pusillus (Schreber, 1775) (Northern Namibia to Port Elizabeth, subspecies endemic)

Family Phocidae – true seals

- Southern elephant seal, Mirounga leonina Linnaeus, 1758 (Antarctica, occasionally washed north by storms)
- Leopard seal, Hydrurga leptonyx (Blainville, 1820), (TMNP MPA).

=== Order Cetartiodactyla ===
==== Infraorder Cetacea ====
Superfamily Mysticeti – baleen whales

Family Balaenidae – right whales

- Southern right whale, Eubalaena australis Desmoulins, 1822 (pelagic, Southern Ocean, winters along the South African coast from central Namibia to southern Mozambique )

Family Balaenopteridae – rorquals

- Common minke whale, Balaenoptera acutorostrata Lacépède, 1804, (TMNP MPA).
- Bryde's whale, Balaenoptera edeni Anderson, 1879 (globally in tropics and sub-tropics)
- Humpback whale Megaptera novaeangliae Borowski, 1781 (pelagic open ocean, migrating from Antarctic waters to tropical waters in winter)

Family Neobalaenidae

- Pygmy right whale, Caperea marginata (Gray, 1846), (TMNP MPA).

Superfamily Odontoceti

Family Delphinidae – oceanic dolphins

- Heaviside's dolphin, Cephalorhynchus heavisidii (Gray, 1828), (TMNP MPA).
- Long-beaked common dolphin, Delphinus delphis Linnaeus, 1758, recorded as syn. Delphinus capensis Gray, 1828 (warm-temperate and tropical waters)
- Dusky dolphin, Lagenorhynchus obscurus (Gray, 1828), also recorded as Sagmatias obscurus Gray, 1828, (Namibian coast to the Cape Peninsula)
- Killer whale, orca, Orcinus orca Linnaeus, 1758 (pelagic, all oceans)
- False killer whale, Pseudorca crassidens (Owen, 1846), (TMNP MPA).
- Striped dolphin, Stenella coeruleoalba (Meyen, 1833), (TMNP MPA).
- Common bottlenose dolphin, Tursiops truncatus Montagu, 1821 (pelagic open ocean though not polar seas)

== Geographical position of places mentioned in species ranges ==
- Agulhas Bank, Western Cape 35°30′S 21°00′E
- Algoa Bay, Eastern Cape, 33°55′S 25°42′E
- Bashee River, Eastern Cape 32°15′S 28°54′E
- Beira, Mozambique19°50′S 34°51′E
- Blaauwberg, Western Cape, 33°48′S 18°27′E
- Cape Agulhas, Western Cape, 34°50′00″S 20°00′09″E
- Cape Columbine, Western Cape, 32°49′39″S 17°51′23″E
- Cape Frio, Namibia, 18°26′12″S 12°00′17″E
- Cape of Good Hope, Western Cape, 34°21′29″S 018°28′19″E (sometimes used historically to refer to the Cape Province, or South Africa)
- Cape Peninsula, Western Cape 34°12′S 18°24′E
- Coffee Bay, Eastern Cape, 31°58′S 29°09′E
- Dassen Island, Western Cape, 33°25′S 18°5′E
- Dassie Point, False Bay,
- Delagoa Bay, Mozambique, 25°59′S 32°42′E
- Doring Bay (Doringbaai), Western Cape, 31°49′S 18°14′E
- Durban, KwaZulu-Natal, 29°51′S 31°01′E
- East London, Eastern Cape, 32°59′S 027°52′E
- Elands Bay, Western Cape, 32°18′S 18°19′E
- False Bay, Western Cape, 34°14′S 18°39′E
- Gordon's Bay Western Cape 34°10′00″S 18°52′00″E
- Hermanus, Western Cape, 34°25′S 19°14′E
- Hout Bay, Cape Peninsula, Western Cape, 34°03′30″S 18°21′20″E
- Inhaca, Mozambique, 26°0′S 32°55′E
- Jeffrey's Bay, Eastern Cape, 34°2′S 24°55′E
- Kei River, Eastern Cape, 32°40′35″S 28°23′10″E
- Knysna, Western Cape, 34°05′02″S 23°03′37″E
- Kommetjie, Western Cape, 34°08′S 18°19′E
- Kosi Bay, Kwa-Zulu-Natal, 26°54′06″S 32°51′59″E
- Lamberts Bay, Western Cape, 32°05′24″S 18°18′10″E
- Langebaan Lagoon, Western Cape, 33°09′S 18°04′E
- Limpopo River, Mozambique, 25°10′S 33°35′E
- Lüderitz, Namibia, 26°38′53″S 15°9′34″E
- Mabibi, (Mbibi) Kwa-Zulu-Natal, 29°20′10″S 32°45′10″E
- Mazeppa Bay, Eastern Cape, 32.478°S 28.651°E
- Melkbosstrand, Western Cape, 33°43′38″S 18°26′06″E
- Miller's Point, Cape Peninsula, 34°13′51.6″S 18°28′26.4″E
- Mossel Bay, Western Cape, 34°11′S 22°08′E
- Möwe Point (Namibia),19°22′47.85″S 12°42′29.02″E (Möwe Point lighthouse)
- Muizenberg, False Bay, Western Cape, 34°07′S 018°28′E
- Noordhoek, Cape Peninsula, Western Cape, 34°07′S 18°21′E
- Olifants River (Western Cape) 31°42′S 18°13′E
- Onrust River, Western Cape, 34°25′8″S 19°10′44″E
- Orange River, Northern Cape, 28°38′S 16°27′E
- Plettenberg Bay, Western Cape, 34°03′S 023°22′E
- Port Alfred, Eastern Cape, 33°36′15″S 26°54′12″E
- Port Elizabeth, Eastern Cape, 33°58′S 25°35′E
- Port Nolloth, Northern Cape, 22°15′S 16°52′E
- Port St. Johns, KwaZulu-Natal, 31°37′40″S 29°33′20″E
- Richards Bay, KwaZulu-Natal, 28°48′S 32°06′E
- Rooikrans, Cape Peninsula 34°20′28″S 18°28′23″E
- Saldanha Bay, Western Cape, 33°01′S 17°59′E
- Slangkop, Cape Peninsula, 34°08′54.59″S 18°19′11.89″E
- Smitswinkel Bay, False Bay, Western Cape, 34°16′S 18°28′E
- Sodwana Bay, KwaZulu-Natal, 27°32′S 32°41′E
- Storms River, Eastern Cape, 34°01′15″S 23°54′10″E
- Strandfontein, False Bay, Western Cape, 34°05′22″S 18°33′18″E
- Strandfontein, Western Cape, 31°45′20″S 18°13′38″E
- Swakopmund, Namibia, 22°41′S 14°32′E
- Table Bay, Western Cape, 33°53′S 18°27′E
- Tsitsikamma, Eastern Cape, 34°01′18″S 22°53′44″E
- Umtata River 31°56′S 29°11′E
- Vulcan Rock, Cape Peninsula, 34°03′58″S 18°18′35″E
- Walvis Bay, Namibia, 22°57′22″S 14°30′29″E
- Windmill Beach Simon's Town, Cape Peninsula, 34°12′04″S 18°27′24″E
- Xora River, Eastern Cape, 32°09′00″S 28°59′00″E

== See also ==
- List of marine invertebrates of the Cape Peninsula and False Bay – Regional biodiversity species list
- List of brown seaweeds of the Cape Peninsula and False Bay – Regional biodiversity species list
- List of green seaweeds of the Cape Peninsula and False Bay – Regional biodiversity species list
- List of red seaweeds of the Cape Peninsula and False Bay – Regional biodiversity species list
- Geology of Cape Town
- List of echinoderms of South Africa – List of species that form a part of the echinoderm fauna of South Africa
- List of marine crustaceans of South Africa – List of saltwater species that form a part of the crustacean fauna of South Africa
- List of marine fishes of South Africa – Fishes recorded from the oceans bordering South Africa
- List of marine molluscs of South Africa – List of saltwater species that form a part of the molluscan fauna of South Africa
- List of sea spiders of South Africa – List of saltwater species that form a part of the pycnogonid fauna of South Africa
- List of brown seaweeds of South Africa
- List of green seaweeds of South Africa
- List of red seaweeds of South Africa
