= Cubiceps pauciradiatus =

Scientific classification
- Kingdom: Animalia
- Phylum: Chordata
- Class: Actinopterygii
- Division: Teleostei
- Order: Scombriformes
- Family: Nomeidae
- Genus: Cubiceps
- Species: C. pauciradiatus

Binomial name
- Cubiceps pauciradiatus Günther, 1872

Species of ray-finned fish

Cubiceps pauciradiatus is a species of ray-finned fish in the family Nomeidae (driftfishes).
