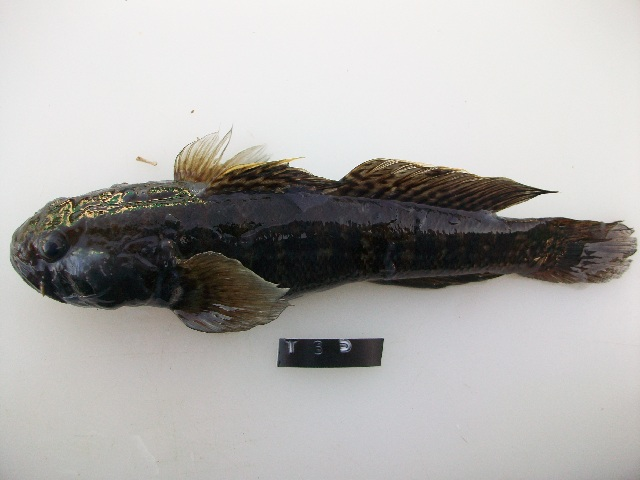
- Caffrogobius nudiceps

Scientific classification
- Kingdom: Animalia
- Phylum: Chordata
- Class: Actinopterygii
- Order: Gobiiformes
- Family: Gobiidae
- Subfamily: Gobiinae
- Genus: Caffrogobius; Smitt, 1900

Type species
- Gobius nudiceps Valenciennes, 1837

= Caffrogobius =

Genus of fishes

Caffrogobius is a genus of fish in the family Gobiidae, native to the Atlantic and Indian Ocean coasts of southern Africa and from around the Seychelles.

== Species ==
There are currently seven recognized species in this genus:

- Caffrogobius agulhensis (Barnard, 1927) (Agulhas goby)
- Caffrogobius caffer (Günther, 1874)
- Caffrogobius dubius (J. L. B. Smith, 1959)
- Caffrogobius gilchristi (Boulenger, 1898) (Prison goby)
- Caffrogobius natalensis (Günther, 1874) (Baldy)
- Caffrogobius nudiceps (Valenciennes, 1837) (Barehead goby)
- Caffrogobius saldanha (Barnard, 1927) (Commafin goby)
