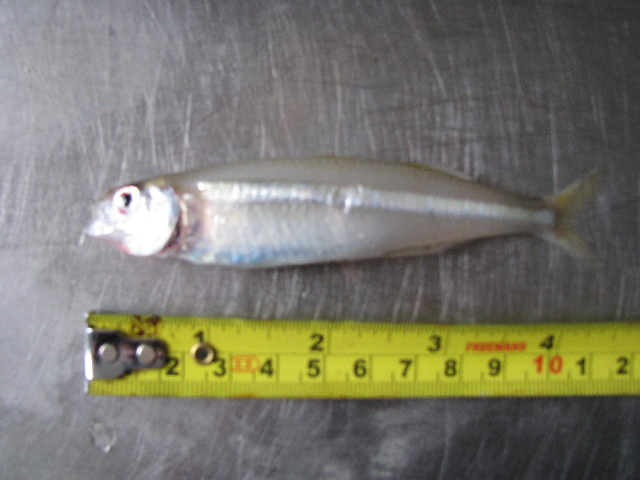

Scientific classification
- Domain: Eukaryota
- Kingdom: Animalia
- Phylum: Chordata
- Class: Actinopterygii
- Order: Atheriniformes
- Family: Atherinidae
- Genus: Atherina
- Species: A. breviceps

Binomial name
- Atherina breviceps Valenciennes, 1835

Synonyms
- Atherina parvipinnis Valenciennes, 1835; Hepsetia breviceps (Valenciennes, 1835)

= Cape silverside =

Species of fish

The Cape silverside (Atherina breviceps) is a species of marine fish of the family Atherinidae. It is a brackish, freshwater, pelagic-neritic subtropical fish up to 11.0 cm maximal length. It is widespread in the southeastern Atlantic from Lüderitz in Namibia to northern Natal in South Africa.
