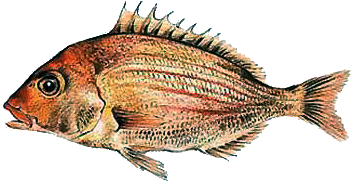

Conservation status
- Least Concern (IUCN 3.1)

Scientific classification
- Kingdom: Animalia
- Phylum: Chordata
- Class: Actinopterygii
- Order: Acanthuriformes
- Family: Sparidae
- Genus: Pterogymnus; J. L. B. Smith, 1938
- Species: P. laniarius

Binomial name
- Pterogymnus laniarius (Valenciennes, 1830)

Synonyms
- Pagrus laniarius Valenciennes, 1830; Chrysophrys laniarius Valenciennes, 1830

= Panga =

Species of fish

The panga (Pterogymnus laniarius), or panga seabream is a species of marine ray-finned fish belonging to the family Sparidae, which includes the seabreams and porgies. It is the only species in the monospecific genus Pterogymnus. This species is endemic to the coasts of South Africa. The panga is an important species in commercial line fisheries off South Africa.

== Taxonomy ==
The panga was first formally described as Pagrus laniarius in 1830 by the French zoologist Achille Valenciennes in volume 6 of Histoire naturelle des poissons, its type locality was given as the Cape of Good Hope in South Africa. In 1938 James Leonard Brierley Smith reclassified this species in the monospecific genus Pterogymnus. This taxon is placed in the family Sparidae within the order Spariformes by the 5th edition of Fishes of the World. Some authorities classify this genus in the subfamily Sparinae, but the 5th edition of Fishes of the World does not recognise subfamilies within the Sparidae.

== Etymology ==
The panga has the genus name Pterogymnus which combines ptero, meaning "fin", and gymnus, meaning "naked", a reference to the lack of scales on the soft rayed parts of the dorsal and anal fins, when compared to Cymatoceps. The specific name, laniarius, means "butcher" or "pertaining to butchers", an allusion Valenciennes did not explain.

== Description ==
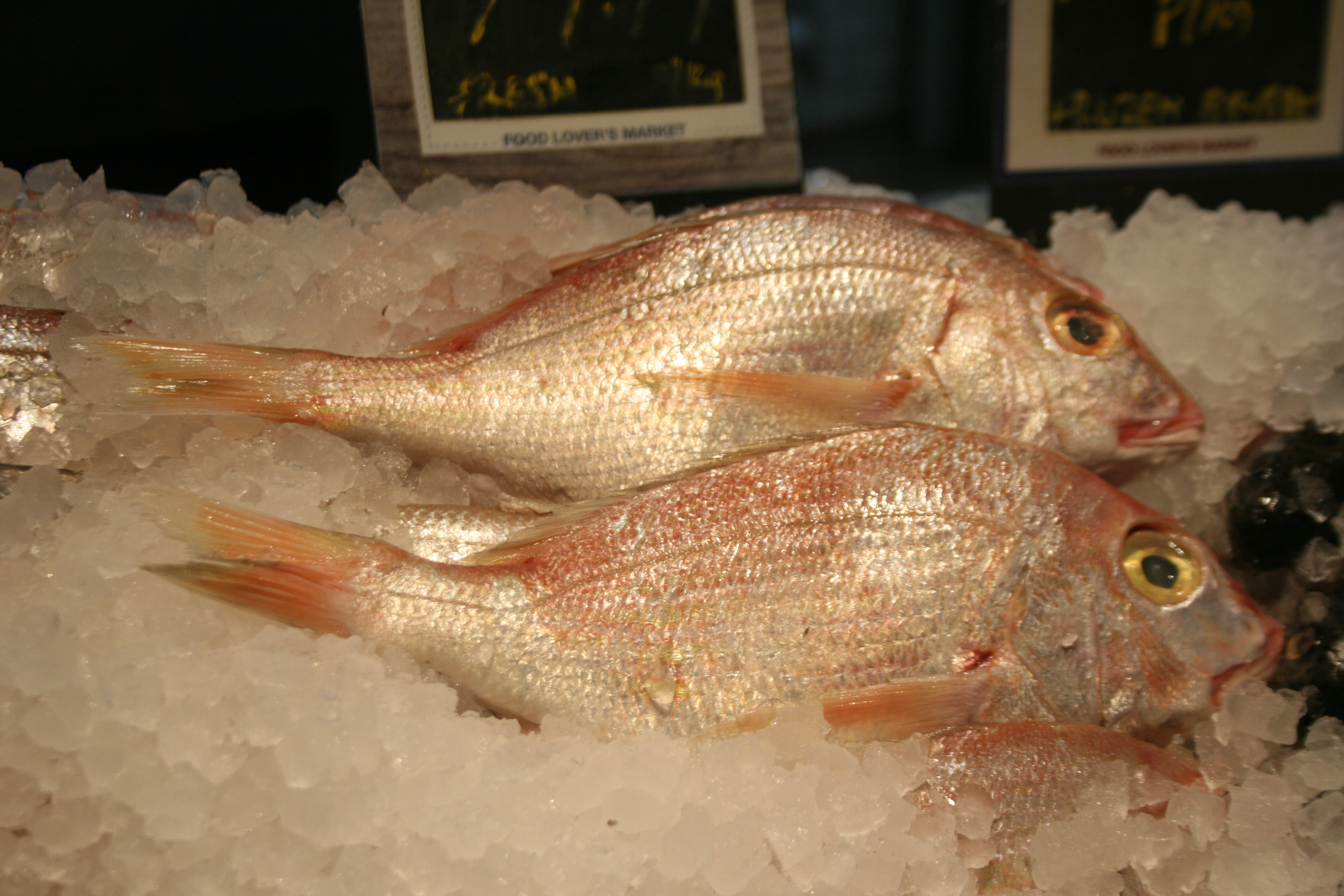
For sale at a fish market in Pretoria

The panga has the area between the eyes and the flange on the preoperculum scaled. The lower jaw has 2 rows of molar-like teeth. The dorsal fin has 12 spines and 10 soft rays while the anal fin has 3 spines and 8 soft rays. There is a scaly sheath at the base of the soft rayed parts of both the dorsal and anal fin but no scales on the soft rayed part of these fins. The compressed body is ovoid in shape with a depth that fits into its standard length 2.3 to 2.5 times. The dorsal profile of the head is smoothly convex and the eye is large with the rear edge of the preorbital bone having a wave-like shape and is not covered by the scales of the cheek. The overall colour of the body is red or pink, lighter in colour on the lower body, with 5 or 6 indistinct bluish, horizontal lines underneath the lateral line. This species has a maximum total length of 45 cm (18 in), although 27 cm (11 in) is more typical.

== Distribution and habitat ==
The panga is endemic to South Africa where it occurs in the southeastern Atlantic Ocean in False Bay in the Western Cape to Beira, Mozambique in the southwestern Indian Ocean. This species is found mostly on deep, low. topographically complex reefs and sometimes over areas of mud and sand as deep as 120 m (390 ft).

== Biology ==
The panga is a predatory species in which the adults feed on benthic invertebrates, mainly crabs with polychaetes, brittle stars and fishes less important as prey. The juveniles feed largely on mysids. This species is a rudimentary hermaphrodite. i.e. the gonads contain both male and female reproductive tissue but is a late gonochorist in which sexual maturity is attained at around 4 or 5 years old. They spawn mainly at the Agulhas Bank and spawning occurs throughout the year.

== Fisheries ==
The panga is an important species for the offshore commercial line fishery in the southern Eastern Cape where it made up 16.5% of the total landings from 1985 to 2007. It is also an important part of the South African demersal inshore trawl fishery where it made up 63% of the landings between 1992 and 1995 and 11% of the landing from the demersal deep sea trawl fishery in the southern Eastern Cape and Western Cape.
