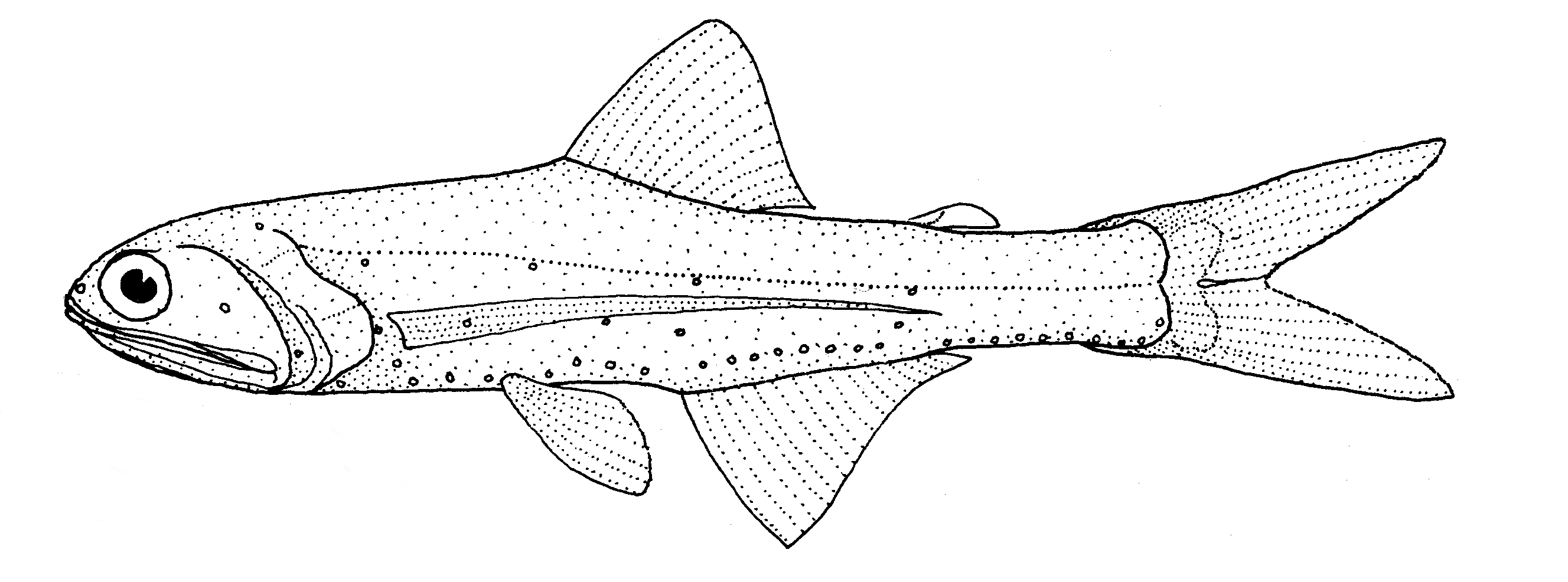
- Drawing by Dr Tony Ayling

Scientific classification
- Kingdom: Animalia
- Phylum: Chordata
- Class: Actinopterygii
- Order: Myctophiformes
- Family: Myctophidae
- Genus: Lampanyctus
- Species: L. australis

Binomial name
- Lampanyctus australis Tåning, 1932

= Southern lanternfish =

Species of fish

The southern lanternfish, Lampanyctus australis, is a lanternfish of the family Myctophidae, found circumglobally in the southern hemisphere between 33° S and 44° S, mainly at below 500 m. Its length is about 13 cm. It is an oceanic mesopelagic species, eaten by hakes, kingklip and Cape horse mackerel.
