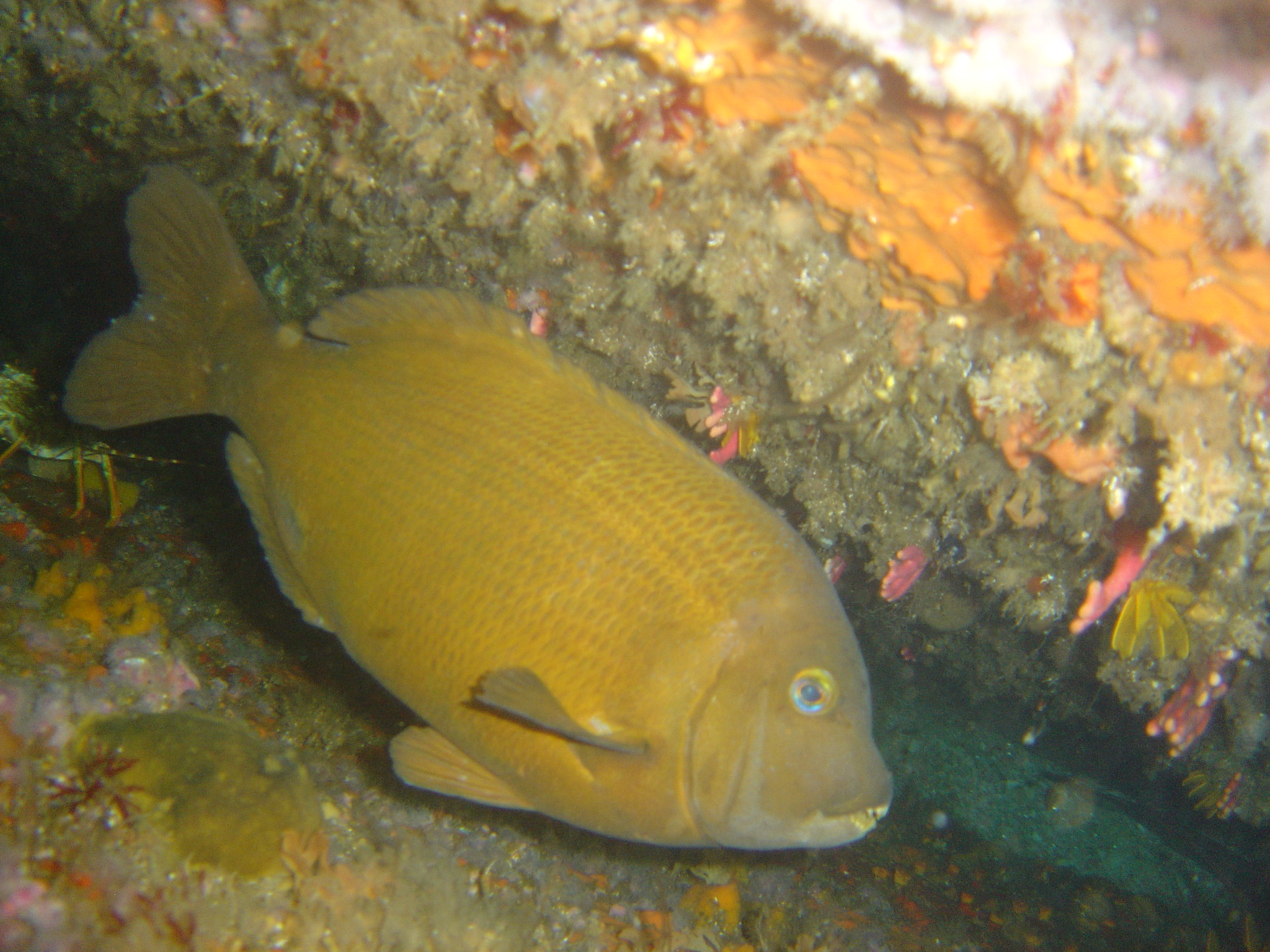
- Janbruin at Whittle Rock

Conservation status
- Least Concern (IUCN 3.1)

Scientific classification
- Kingdom: Animalia
- Phylum: Chordata
- Class: Actinopterygii
- Division: Teleostei
- Order: Acanthuriformes
- Family: Sparidae
- Genus: Gymnocrotaphus; Günther, 1859
- Species: G. curvidens

Binomial name
- Gymnocrotaphus curvidens Günther, 1859

= Gymnocrotaphus =

Seabream endemic to South Africa

Gymnocrotaphus is a monospecific genus of marine ray-finned fish belonging to the family Sparidae, which includes the seabreams and porgies. The only species in the genus is the Gymnocrotophus curvidens, the Janbruin, an endemic to the coasts of South Africa.

== Taxonomy ==
Gymnocrotaphus was first proposed as a monospecific genus in 1859 by the German-bprn British herpetologist and ichthyologist Albert Günther when he described its only species, Gymnocrotaphus curvidens, from the Cape of Good Hope. This taxon is placed in the family Sparidae within the order Spariformes by the 5th edition of Fishes of the World. Some authorities classify this genus in the subfamily Boopsinae, but the 5th edition of Fishes of the World does not recognise subfamilies within the Sparidae.

== Etymology ==
Gymnocrotaphus combines gymnos, meaning naked, and crotaphus meaning "cheek", a reference to the lack of scales on the cheeks of this species. The specific name, curvidens, means "curved teeth", an allusion to the curved incisor-like teeth in rows in the front of each jaw.

== Description ==
Gymnocrotaphus has a naked head, except for some scales on the gill cover. There is a band of curved incisor-like teeth in each jaw with a band of smaller conical teeth inside this and the very small molar-like teeth inside those. There are 10 spines and 11 or 12 soft rays supporting the dorsal fin while the anal fin is supported by 3 spines and 9 or 10 soft rays. The body is rather plump and deep, its depth fitting into its standard length 2.3 times. The dorsal profile of the headis concave in front of the eyes, and just above the eyes too. In life the colour of the body is coppery brown with a bluish grey head and blue eyes. Along each scale row there are orange lines. This species has a maximum published total length of 50 cm (20 in).

== Distribution and habitat ==
Gymnoctotaphus is endemic to the southeastern Atlantic and southwestern Indian Oceans where it is endemic to the coasts of South Africa from False Bay in the [{Western Cape to Port St. Johns in the Eastern Cape. This species is found at depths between 1 and 80 m (3 ft 3 in and 262 ft 6 in) on shallow reefs.

== Biology ==
Gymnocrotaphus is an omnivorous, feeding on sea squirts, bryozoans, polychaetes, algae and crustaceans. It is a sedentary species which tends to stay close to the reef in crevices and overhangs. Little is known about the biology of this species but it is thought it may be hermaphroditic.

== Economic importance ==
Caught by shore anglers and spearfishers, with bag limit, prohibited for sale.

== Conservation status ==
IUCN Status: Least concern. This species is considered to be effectively protected by no-take MPAs over its entire distributional range.
