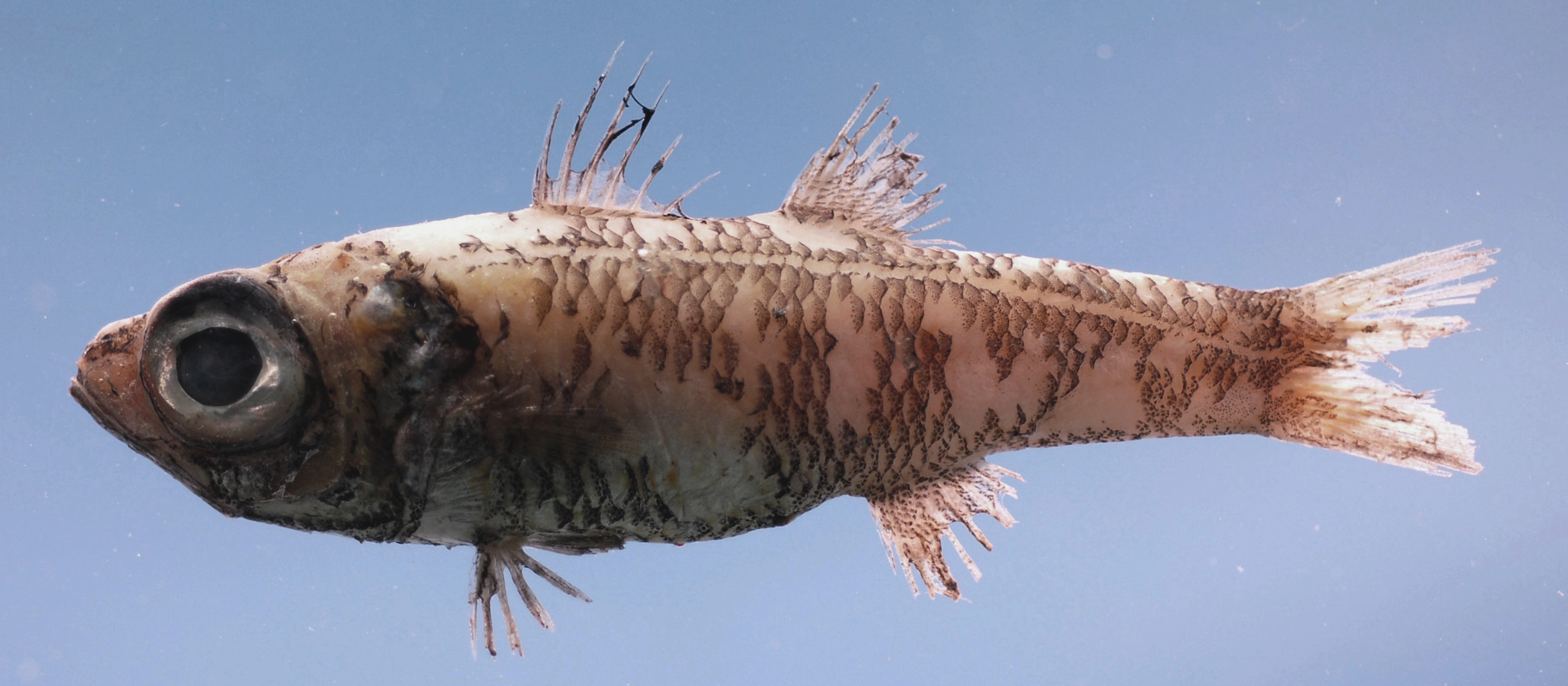

Conservation status
- Least Concern (IUCN 3.1)

Scientific classification
- Kingdom: Animalia
- Phylum: Chordata
- Class: Actinopterygii
- Order: Acropomatiformes
- Family: Epigonidae
- Genus: Epigonus
- Species: E. denticulatus

Binomial name
- Epigonus denticulatus Dieuzeide, 1950

= Pencil cardinal =

Species of ray-finned fish

The pencil cardinalfish (Epigonus denticulatus) is a species of deepwater cardinalfish found around the world at depths of 130 to 830 m (430 to 2,720 ft). This fish can reach up to 20 cm (7.9 in) in TL.

The pencil cardinalfish and the bulls-eye are very similar, except the former has seven spines in the first dorsal fin, whereas the latter has eight.
