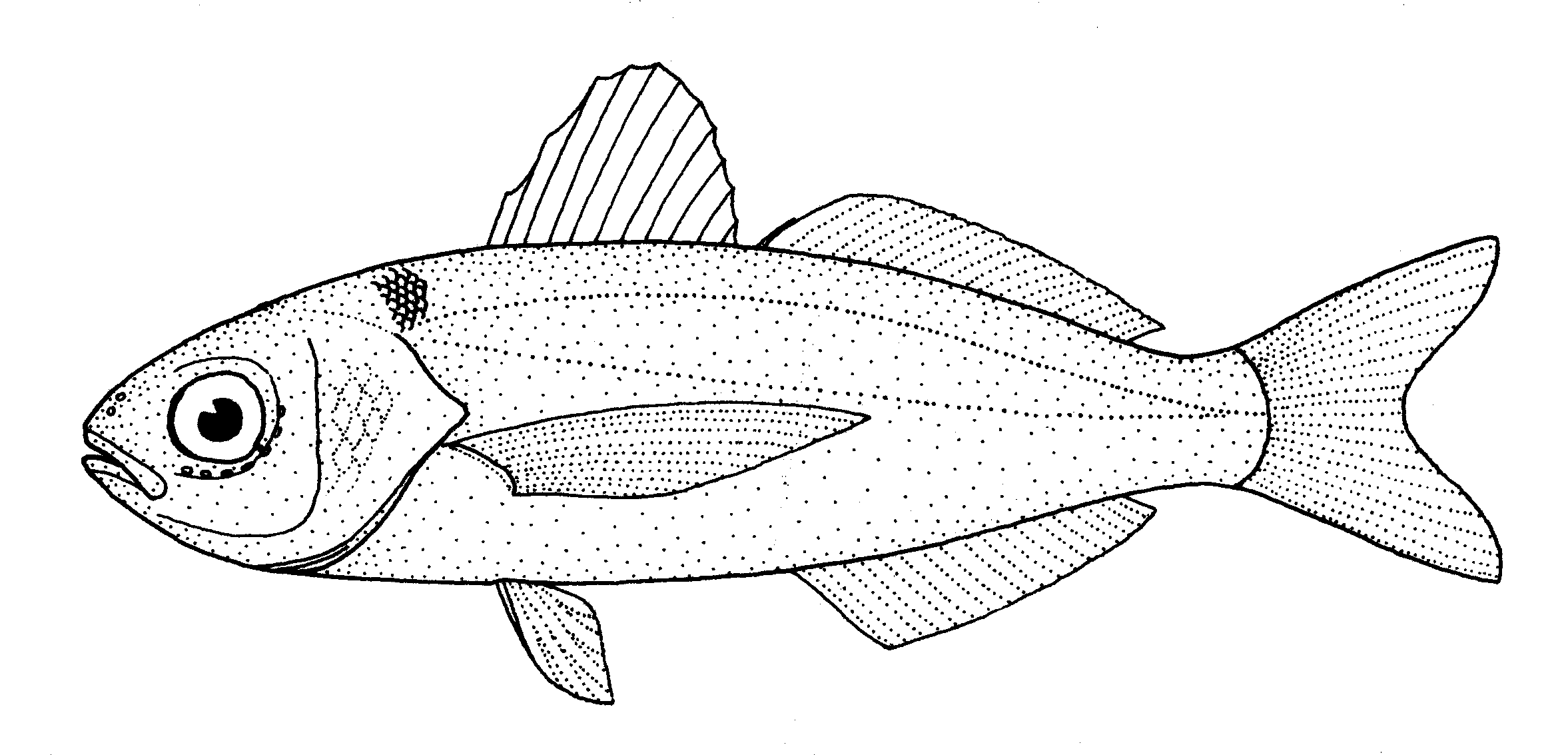
- Cubiceps caeruleus (Blue fathead)
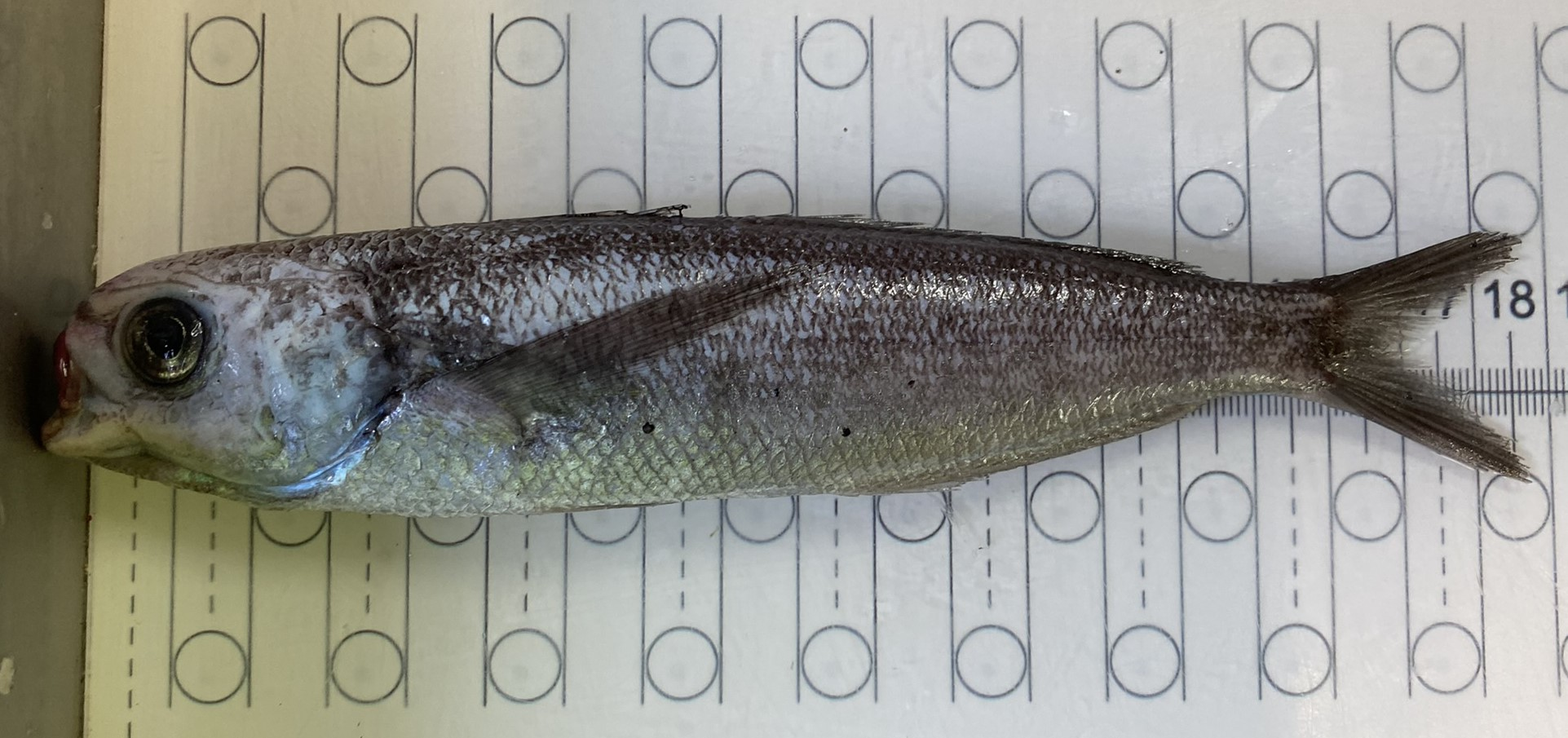
- Specimen of C. gracilis (Longfin cigarfish)

Scientific classification
- Kingdom: Animalia
- Phylum: Chordata
- Class: Actinopterygii
- Order: Scombriformes
- Family: Nomeidae
- Genus: Cubiceps; R. T. Lowe, 1843

Type species
- Seriola gracilis R. T. Lowe, 1843

Synonyms
- Atimostoma A. Smith, 1845; Navarchus De Filippi & Vérany, 1857; Trachelocirrhus Doûmet, 1863; Mulichthys Lloyd, 1909; Mandelichthys Nichols & Murphy, 1944

= Cubiceps =

Cubiceps Temporal range: 5.3–0 Ma Pliocene to Present

Genus of ray-finned fishes

Cubiceps is a genus of driftfishes found circumglobally.

== Species ==
There are currently 10 recognized species in this genus:

- Cubiceps baxteri McCulloch, 1923 (Black fathead)
- Cubiceps caeruleus Regan, 1914 (Blue fathead)
- Cubiceps capensis (A. Smith, 1845) (Cape fathead)
- Cubiceps gracilis (R. T. Lowe, 1843) (Driftfish)
- Cubiceps kotlyari Agafonova, 1988 (Kotlyar's cubehead)
- Cubiceps macrolepis Agafonova, 1988 (Large-scale cigarfish)
- Cubiceps nanus Agafonova, 1988 (Dwarf cigarfish)
- Cubiceps paradoxus J. L. Butler, 1979 (Longfin cigarfish)
- Cubiceps pauciradiatus Günther, 1872 (Longfin fathead)
- Cubiceps whiteleggii (Waite, 1894) (Shadow driftfish)
