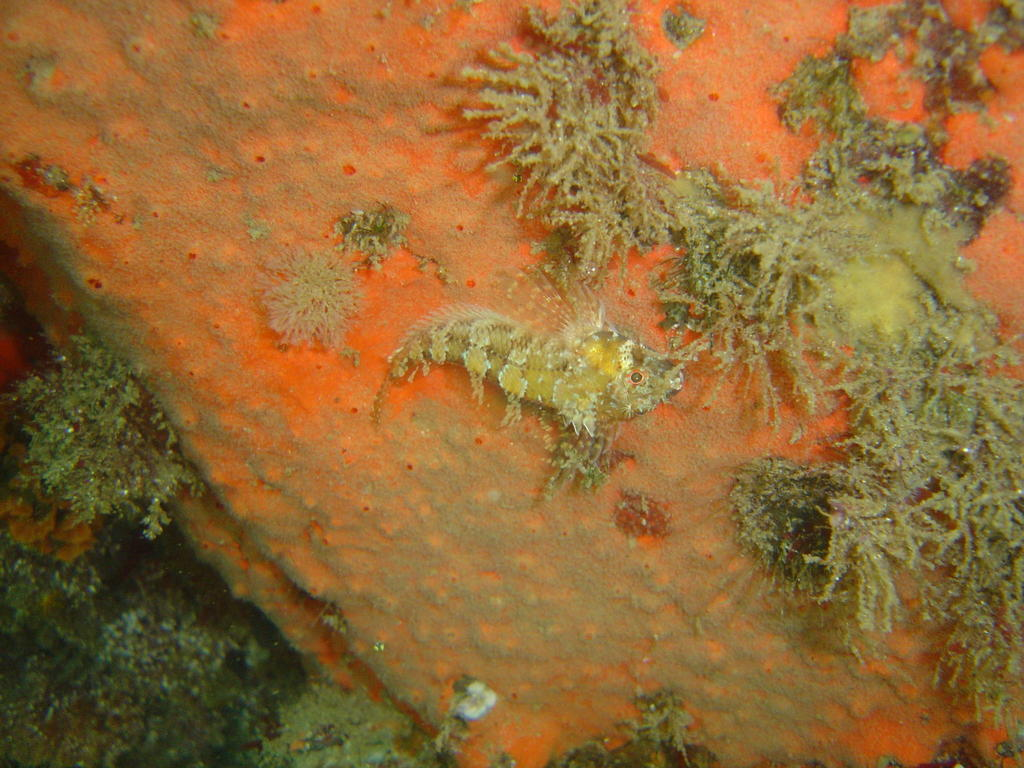

Conservation status
- Least Concern (IUCN 3.1)

Scientific classification
- Kingdom: Animalia
- Phylum: Chordata
- Class: Actinopterygii
- Order: Blenniiformes
- Family: Tripterygiidae
- Subfamily: Tripterygiinae
- Genus: Cremnochorites; Holleman, 1982
- Species: C. capensis

Binomial name
- Cremnochorites capensis (Gilchrist & Thompson, 1908)

Synonyms
- Tripterygium capense Gilchrist & Thompson, 1908; Cremnochorites capense (Gilchrist & Thompson, 1908); Gillias capensis (Gilchrist & Thompson, 1908)

= Cape triplefin =

Species of fish

The Cape triplefin, Cremnochorites capensis, is a triplefin blenny of the family Tripterygiidae and only member of the genus Cremnochorites, found in the western Indian Ocean and southeast Atlantic, from Sodwana Bay to False Bay in South Africa. It reaches a maximum length of 8 centimetres (3.1 in). It is found below the low tide mark down to 30 metres (98 ft) on rocky reefs.
