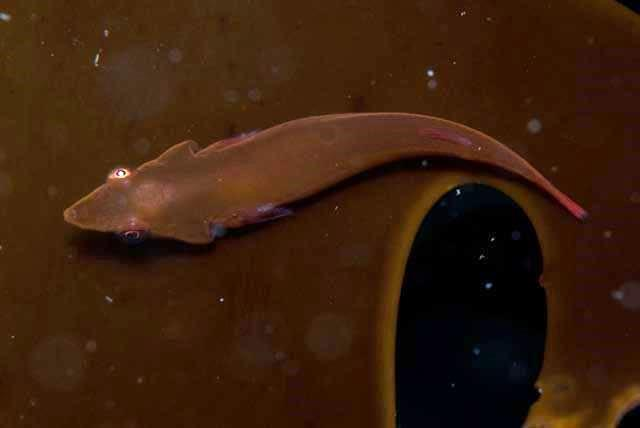

Conservation status
- Least Concern (IUCN 3.1)

Scientific classification
- Kingdom: Animalia
- Phylum: Chordata
- Class: Actinopterygii
- Order: Blenniiformes
- Family: Gobiesocidae
- Genus: Eckloniaichthys
- Species: E. scylliorhiniceps

Binomial name
- Eckloniaichthys scylliorhiniceps J. L. B. Smith, 1943

= Weedsucker =

Species of fish

The weedsucker (Eckloniaichthys scylliorhiniceps) is a species of clingfish found along the coasts of Namibia and South Africa, from Lüderitz to the mouth of the Kei River. This species grows to a maximum length of 3.5 centimetres (1.4 in) Total Length. This species is the only known member of its genus and was described by James L.B. Smith in 1943 with the type locality being described as 10 miles (16 km) west of East London, east of Igoda, South Africa.

The weedsucker is common in the waters off southern Africa and its most obvious trait is that, like clingfishes it secures itself to the substrate by means of a disc like sucker made from modified pelvic fins. Its diet consist wholly of small benthic crustaceans. The eggs are fertilised internally, the female laying from 120 to 150 eggs on the fronds of kelp. They are thought to spawn throughout the year. They are thought to be preyed on by diving birds such as Cape cormorants and by fish such as Poroderma africanum. The weedsucker is regarded as an important component of the kelp forest ecosystem which is found below the low water mark because it forms a link in the food web between its prey of small, benthic crustaceans meiofauna and larger predators.

The generic name is a compound of Ecklonia which a genus of sea bamboo or kelp in which this species occurs and ichthys which is Greek for 'fish'. The specific name is another compound with skyllion being Greek for a dogfish, rhinus meaning 'snout' and ceps meaning 'head', a reference to this species' pointed snout.
