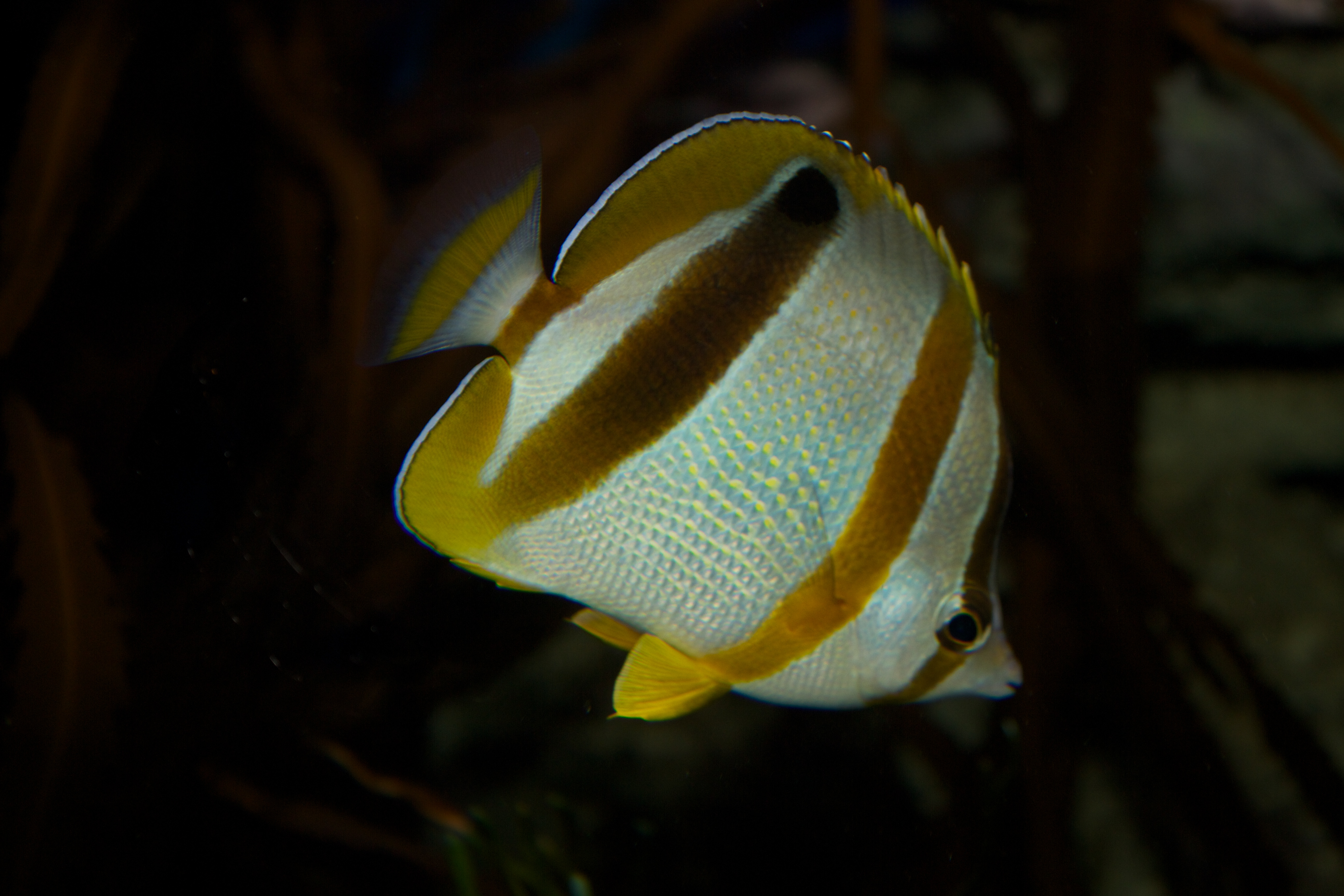

Conservation status
- Least Concern (IUCN 3.1)

Scientific classification
- Kingdom: Animalia
- Phylum: Chordata
- Class: Actinopterygii
- Order: Acanthuriformes
- Family: Chaetodontidae
- Genus: Chaetodon
- Species: C. marleyi

Binomial name
- Chaetodon marleyi Regan, 1921

= Doublesash butterflyfish =

Species of fish

The doublesash butterflyfish, (Chaetodon marleyi), also known as the fourbanded butterflyfish or Marley's butterflyfish, is a species of marine ray-finned fish, a butterflyfish belonging to the family Chaetodontidae. It is found in the southwestern Indian Ocean and the extreme southwestern Atlantic Ocean off southern Africa.

== Description ==
The doublesash butterflyfish has a silvery-white body marked with three broad yellowish-brown vertical bands, another one runs through the eyes, and there is a similar coloured caudal peduncle. The caudal fin has a yellow band while the dorsal and anal fins are yellow. The dorsal fin contains 11 spines and 23-24 soft rays while the anal fin has 3 spines and 18-19 soft rays. This species attains a maximum total length of 20 centimetres (7.9 in).

== Distribution ==
The doublesash butterflyfish is found off Southern Africa from Delagoa Bay in Mozambique to Lambert's Bay on the Atlantic coast of Western Cape Province in South Africa.

== Habitat and biology ==
The doublesash butterflyfish can be found on both rock and coral reefs, as well as in estuaries. They may be found at depths of up to 120 metres (390 ft). This is an oviparous species which forms pairs for spawning. This species is omnivorous and feeds on macroalgae, as well as benthic invertebrates such as polychaetes, crustaceans, hydroids and ascidians.

== Systematics ==
The doublesash butterflyfish was first formally described in 1921 by the English ichthyologist Charles Tate Regan (1878-1943) with the type locality given as East London. Regan honoured the collector of the type, the Natal fisheries officer Harold Walter Bell-Marley (1872-1945), in the specific name. Its closest relative is the West African Chaetodon hoefleri. Some authorities place this species within the nominate subgenus Chaetodon but others consider it to be incertae sedis.
