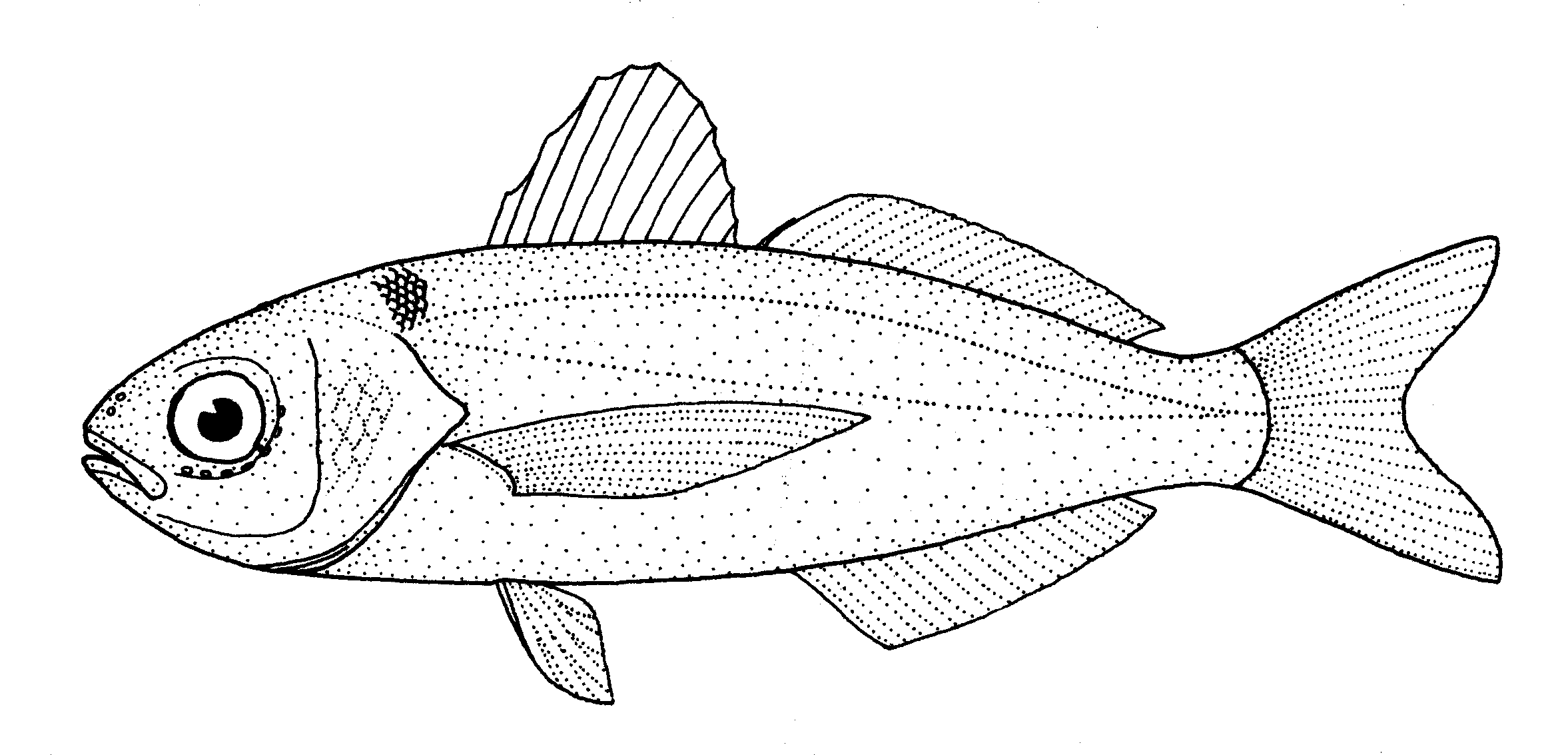
- Drawing by Dr Tony Ayling

Conservation status
- Least Concern (IUCN 3.1)

Scientific classification
- Kingdom: Animalia
- Phylum: Chordata
- Class: Actinopterygii
- Order: Scombriformes
- Family: Nomeidae
- Genus: Cubiceps
- Species: C. caeruleus

Binomial name
- Cubiceps caeruleus Regan, 1914

= Blue fathead =

Species of ray-finned fish

Cubiceps caeruleus, the blue fathead or cubehead, is a species of driftfish native to the Pacific and Atlantic oceans. It is a pelagic fish that can be found at depths of from 20 to 250 metres (66 to 820 ft). It mostly feeds on salps. This species can reach a length of 25.6 centimetres (10.1 in) TL.
