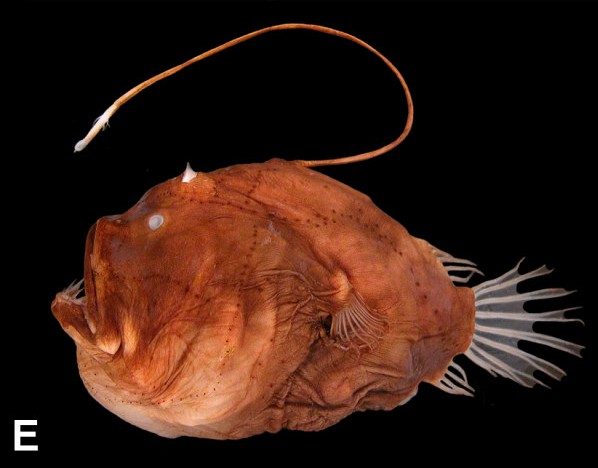

Conservation status
- Least Concern (IUCN 3.1)

Scientific classification
- Kingdom: Animalia
- Phylum: Chordata
- Class: Actinopterygii
- Order: Lophiiformes
- Family: Diceratiidae
- Genus: Bufoceratias
- Species: B. wedli

Binomial name
- Bufoceratias wedli (Pietschmann, 1926)

Synonyms
- Phrynichthys wedli Pietschmann, 1926; Diceratias wedli (Pietschmann, 1926); Paroneirodes wedli (Pietschmann, 1926)

= Bufoceratias wedli =

Species of fish

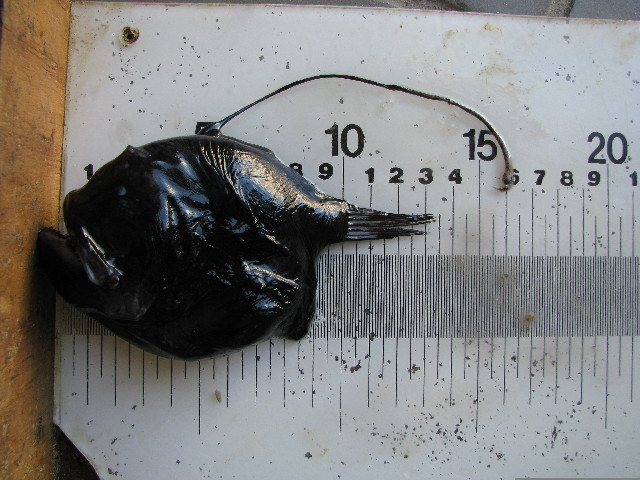
Bufoceratias wedli

Bufoceratias wedli is a species of deep sea marine ray-finned fish belonging to the family Diceratiidae, the double anglers. This anglerfish is found in deep water over the continental shelf in the tropical and subtropical areas of the Eastern and Western Atlantic Oceans. It is the type species of the genus Bufoceratias and like other members of that genus is known only from adult females, the unknown males are thought to be free living rather than sexual parasites of the females like those of some other deep sea anglerfishes.

== Taxonomy ==
Bufeceratias wedli was first formally described as Phrynichthys wedli by the Austrian ichthyologist Viktor Pietschmann with its type locality given as Madeira. When Pietschmann described P. wedli he named a new monospecific genus, Phrynichthys, but this name was preoccupied by a genus named in 1846 by Louis Agassiz which is now regarded as a synonym of Synanceia. In 1931 Gilbert Percy Whitley proposed the replacement name Bufoceratias for Pietschmann's Phrynichthys. The genus Bufoceratias, along with Diceratias, are the two genera making up the family Diceratiidae which the 5th edition of Fishes of the World classifies within the suborder Ceratioidei within the order Lophiiformes, the anglerfishes.

== Etymology ==
Bufocertaias wedli is the type species of the genus Bufoceratias, this name is a combination of bufo meaning "toad" with Ceratias, as when Whitley described it, it was classified within the family Ceratiidae. Whitley did bot explain the use of bufo but it is possible that it is a variation on phryne, another word for "toad" which is a suffix commonly applied to anglerfish genera. It may also be evoking Bufichthys. The specific name honours Anton Wedl, an Austrian businessman and philanthropist for his support of the University of Vienna and its students in the hardships it and they suffered following the end of the First World War and for his interest in the University's natural history museum, Peitschmann's workplace.

== Description ==
Bufocertaias wedli is known only from metamorphosed females which have the second, club-like exposed cephalic spine bearing a bioluminescent organ at its tip which characterises the family. They also have a large mouth which reaches back beyond the eye, a well developed spine on the symphysis ov the mandible which reaches just past the maxilla, the presence of vomerine teeth, there are spines in the skin, the dorsal fin has between five and seven rays while the anal fin has four rays and they have a small pelvic bone which is joined to the cleithrum. The second cephalic spine is positioned directly behind the base of the first cephalic spine, or illicium and can be pulled down beneath the skin in individuals with a total length greater than 1.3 cm (0.51 in) leaving a small pore to show its location. They are distinguished from the metamorphosed females of Diceratias, the other genus in the family, by having an illicium which is equivalent to 25% to 225% of the standard length compared to 27% to 41%, the forward tip of the illicium's pterygiophore is hidden in the skin while in Diceratias it is exposed. The illicium has its origin at the base of the skull rather than on the snout and the illicial trough is shallow, rather than deep, and the spinules on the skin are much smaller. B. wedli differs from its congeners in that its illicium is longer than that of B. shaoi beinequivalent to 83% to 225% of its standard length compared to 26 to 405 in B. shaoi with a smaller esca. In comparison to B. thele, B. wedli has clear front, rear and side appendages to its esca. This species has a maximum published total length of 25 cm (9.8 in).

== Distribution and habitat ==
Bufoceratias wedli is found in tropical and subtopical waters on the continental shelf and continental slopes at depths between 300 and 1,750 m (980 and 5,740 ft), typically no lower than 1,500 m (4,900 ft). In the Western Atlantic it is found from Virginia and Bermuda, south through the Caribbean Sea and Gulf of Mexico to the waters off southern Brazil. In the eastern Atlantic it ranges from off mainland Portugal south to Namibia, including the Macaronesian Islands, the islands in the Gulf of Guinea, Saint Helena and Ascension Island. Records from the Pacific Ocean are now considered to be misidentifications of B. thele.

== Biology ==
Bufoceratias wedli is a predator and the examination of the stomach contents of double anglers has found fish, fish scales, coelenterates, polychaetes, sea urchins, crustaceans and gastropods. It is thought that at least the larger individuals of this genus live on the bottom, although the smaller specimens may be bathypelagic, the inclusion of polychaetes and sea urchins in the recorded stomach contents supports this. The males are unknown but are thought to be free living and non-parasitic.
