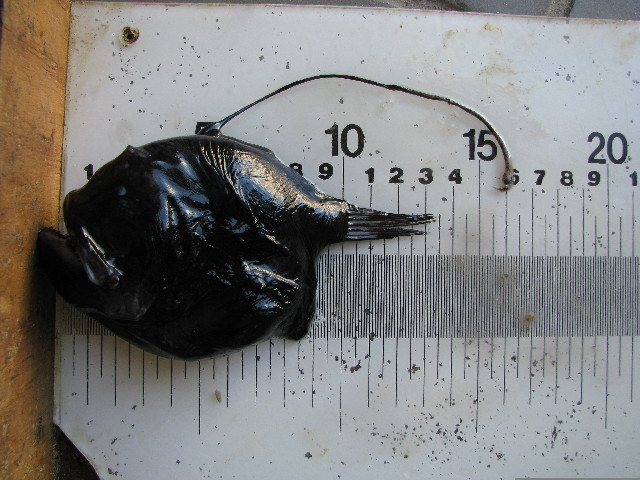
- Bufoceratias wedli

Scientific classification
- Kingdom: Animalia
- Phylum: Chordata
- Class: Actinopterygii
- Order: Lophiiformes
- Family: Diceratiidae
- Genus: Bufoceratias; Whitley, 1931

Type species
- Phrynichthys wedli Pietschmann, 1926

Synonyms
- Phrynichthys Pietschmann, 1926

= Bufoceratias =

Genus of fishes

Bufoceratias is a genus of marine ray-finned fishes belonging to the family Diceratiidae, the double anglers. Fishes in this genus are found in the Indian, Pacific and Western Atlantic Oceans.

== Taxonomy ==
Bufoceratias was first proposed as a genus in 1931 by the British-born Australian ichthyologist Gilbert Percy Whitley with Phrynichthys wedli as its type species. Whitley was replacing Phrynichthys as the genus name because Whitley thought that this name was preoccupied by Phrynichthys Agassiz, 1864, which was a replacement name for Bufichthys Swainson, 1839, and Whitley's name is now accepted. Phrynichthys wedli had been first formally described in 1926 by the Austrian ichthyologist Viktor Pietschmann with its type locality given as Madeira. This genus is one of two genera in the family Diceratiidae which the 5th edition of Fishes of the World classifies within the suborder Ceratioidei within the order Lophiiformes, the anglerfishes.

== Etymology ==
Bufoceratias is a combination of bufo meaning "toad" with Ceratias, as when Whitley described it, it was classified within the family Ceratiidae. Whitley did not explain the use of bufo but it is possible that it is a variation on phryne, another word for "toad" which is a suffix commonly applied to anglerfish genera. It may also be evoking Bufichthys.

== Species ==
Bufoceratias has 4 recognised species classified within it:

- Bufoceratias microcephalus H. C. Ho, Kawai & Amaoka, 2016 (Small-head toady seadevil)
- Bufoceratias shaoi Pietsch, H. C. Ho & H. M. Chen, 2004
- Bufoceratias thele (Uwate, 1979)
- Bufoceratias wedli (Pietschmann, 1926)

== Characteristics ==
Bufoceratias double anglers are known only from metamorphosed females which have the second, club-like exposed cephalic spine bearing a bioluminescent organ at its tip which caharcterises the family. They also have a large mouth which reaches back beyond the eye, a well developed spine on the symphysis ov the mandible which reaches just past the maxilla, the presence of vomerine teeth, there are spines in the skin, the dorsal fin has between five and seven rays while the anal fin has four rays and they have a small pelvic bone which is joined to the cleithrum. The second cephalic spine is positioned directly behind the base of the first cephalic spine, or illicium and can be pulled down beneath the skin in individuals with a total length greater than 1.3 cm (0.51 in) leaving a small pore to show its location. They are distinguished from the metamorphosed females of Diceratias, the other genus in the family, by having an illicium which is equivalent to 25% to 225% of the standard length compared to 27% to 41%, the forward tip of the illicium's pterygiophore is hidden in the skin while in Diceratias it is exposed. The illicium has its origin at the base of the skull rather than on the snout and the illicial trough is shallow, rather than deep, and the spinules on the skin are much smaller. These anglerfishes vary in length from a maximum published standard length of 10.1 cm (4.0 in) for Bufoceratias shaoi to a maximum published total length of 25 cm (9.8 in) for B. wedli.

== Distribution and habitat ==
Bufoceratias double anglers have been found in the Atlantic, Indian and Pacific Oceans, B. wedli is found in the western and eastern Atlantic Oceans with the other species being found in the Indo-Pacific region. These fishes are bathypelagic and have been recorded from depths from 0 to 1,750 m (0 to 5,741 ft).
