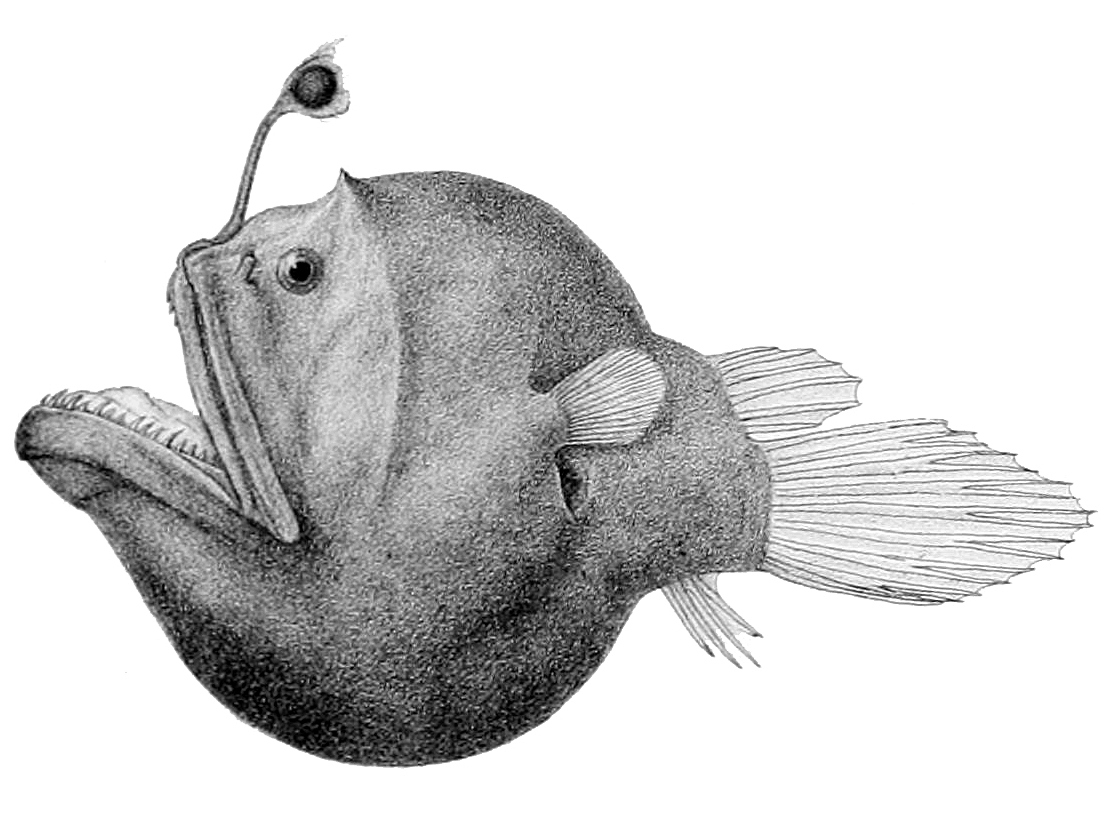
- Diceratias bispinosus

Scientific classification
- Kingdom: Animalia
- Phylum: Chordata
- Class: Actinopterygii
- Division: Teleostei
- Order: Lophiiformes
- Suborder: Ceratioidei
- Family: Diceratiidae; Regan & Trewavas, 1932

Genera
- See text

Synonyms
- Aeschynichthyidae Golvan, 1962

= Double angler =

Family of fishes

Double anglers or doublespine seadevils comprise the family Diceratiidae, being a small and little known family of rarely encountered marine ray-finned fishes belonging to the order Lophiiformes, the anglerfishes. The two genera and seven species of this family are found in the deeper waters of the tropical and subtropical Atlantic, Indian and Pacific Oceans. They are distinguished from other deep sea anglerfishes by the possession of a second bioluminescent cephalic spine. The fishes in this family were known only from metamorphosed females and the males were not described until 1983.

== Taxonomy ==
The double angler family, Diceratiidae, was first proposed as a family in 1932 by the British ichthyologists Charles Tate Regan and Ethelwynn Trewavas. The type genus of the family, Diceratias, had been proposed as a subgenus of Ceratias in 1887 by the German-born British ichthyologist Albert Günther with its type species being Ceratias bispinosus which Günther had described from a holotype collected from off Banda Island at a depth of 360 fathoms (2,160 ft; 660 m) on the Challenger expedition of 1872-1876. The 5th edition of Fishes of the World classifies this family in the suborder Ceratioidei of the anglerfish order Lophiiformes.

== Etymology ==
The double angler family name is derived from the genus name Diceratias which prefixes di, meaning "two" onto the genus name Ceratias. This genus was thought to be a subgenus of Ceratias with two cephalic spines instead of one.

== Genera and species ==
The double angler family, Diceratiidae, is made up of two genera with seven recognised valid species:

- Genus Bufoceratias Whitley 1931
  - Bufoceratias microcephalus H. C. Ho, Kawai & Amaoka, 2016
  - Bufoceratias shaoi Pietsch, Ho & Chen, 2004
  - Bufoceratias thele (Uwate, 1979)
  - Bufoceratias wedli (Pietschmann), 1926
- Genus Diceratias Günther, 1887
  - Diceratias bispinosus (Günther, 1887) (two-rod anglerfish)
  - Diceratias pileatus Uwate, 1979
  - Diceratias trilobus Balushkin & Fedorov, 1986

== Characteristics ==
Doubleanglers are sexually dimorphic. The metamorphosed females can be separated from other females in the suborder Ceratioidei by the possession of a second, club-like exposed cephalic spine bearing a bioluminescent organ at its tip. They also have a large mouth which reaches back beyond the eye, a well developed spine on the symphysis of the mandible which reaches just past the maxilla, the presence of vomerine teeth, there are spines in the skin, the dorsal fin has between five and seven rays while the anal fin has four rays and they have a small pelvic bone which is joined to the cleithrum. The second cephalic spine is positioned directly behind the base of the first cephalic spine, or illicium and can be pulled down beneath the skin in individuals with a total length greater than 1.3 cm (0.51 in) leaving a small pore to show its location. These anglerfishes vary in length from a maximum published standard length of 10.1 cm (4.0 in) for Bufoceratias shaoi to a maximum published total length of 25 cm (9.8 in) for B. wedli. The males have spinules in the skin, they have two teeth on the snout and two transverse rows of 4 or 5 teeth on the lower jaw, all separate from each other. The eyes and nostrils of the males are directed laterally.

== Distribution and habitat ==
Doube anglers are found in the Atlantic, Pacific and Indian oceans in tropical and subtropical waters over the continental shelf and continental margin, at depths between 0 and 2,306 m (0 and 7,566 ft).

== Biology ==
Double anglers are rare fishes and only the metamorphosed females have been described, the males are thought to be free-living and not to be sexual parasites of the females.

== See also ==
- List of fish families
