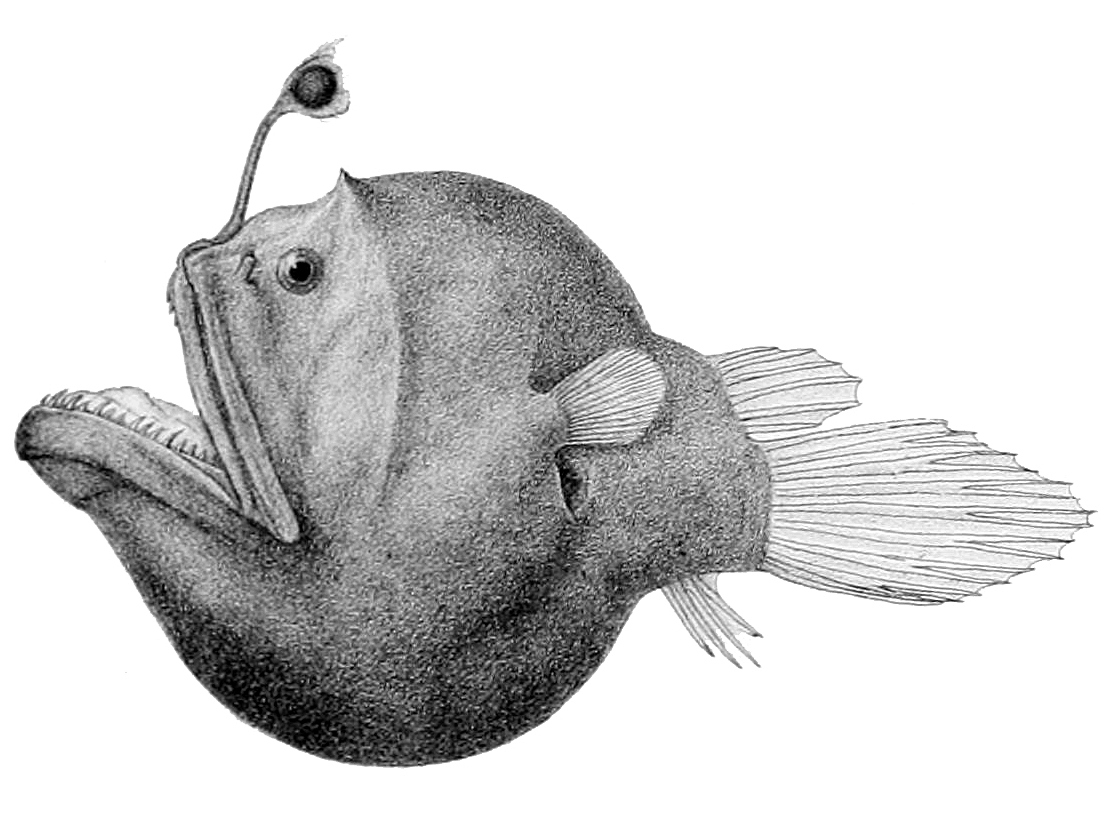

Conservation status
- Least Concern (IUCN 3.1)

Scientific classification
- Kingdom: Animalia
- Phylum: Chordata
- Class: Actinopterygii
- Order: Lophiiformes
- Family: Diceratiidae
- Genus: Diceratias
- Species: D. bispinosus

Binomial name
- Diceratias bispinosus Günther, 1887

= Diceratias bispinosus =

Species of fish

Diceratias bispinosus, the two-rod angler, is a species of deep sea marine ray-finned fish belonging to the family Diceratiidae, the double anglers. This species is found in the Indo-Pacific region.

== Taxonomy ==
Diceratias bispinosus was first formally described in 1887 by the German-born British herpetologist and ichthyologist Albert Günther with its type locality off Banda Island at a depth of 360 fathoms (2,160 ft; 660 m) on the Challenger expedition of 1872-1876. When Günther described this species he proposed the new monospecific genus, Diceratias, so this species is the type species of that genus. The genus Diceratias is one of two genera in the family Diceratiidae which the 5th edition of Fishes of the World classifies within the suborder Ceratioidei within the order Lophiiformes, the anglerfishes.

== Etymology ==
Diceratias bispinosus is the type species of the genus Diceratias, this name prefixes di, meaning "two" onto the genus name Ceratias. Günther originally proposed Diceratias as a subgenus of Ceratias with two cephalic spines instead of one. The specific name bispinosus means "two spined", an allusion to the two cephalic spines, the second spine being rather rudimentary.

== Description ==
Diceratias bispinosus is sexually dimorphic and the metamorphosed females have the second, club-like exposed cephalic spine bearing a bioluminescent organ at its tip which characterises the family Diceratiidae. In the genus Diceratias the spine is on the snout rather than being located at the back of the head as in Bufoceratias, the forward tip of the illicium's pterygiophore is exposed while in Bufoceratias it is hidden and it has a deep trough it can be retracted into. The spine is shorter than in Bufoceratias having a length equivalent to between 27% and 47% of the standard length. They also have a large mouth which reaches back beyond the eye, a well developed spine on the symphysis of the mandible which reaches just past the maxilla, the presence of vomerine teeth, there are large spines in the skin, the dorsal fin has between five and seven rays while the anal fin has four rays and they have a small pelvic bone which is joined to the cleithrum. The second cephalic spine is positioned directly behind the base of the first cephalic spine, or illicium and can be pulled down beneath the skin in individuals with a total length greater than 1.3 cm (0.51 in) leaving a small pore to show its location. The males have spinules in the skin, they have two teeth on the snout and two transverse rows of 4 or 5 teeth on the lower jaw, all separate from each other. The eyes and nostrils of the males are directed laterally. This is the largest species in the genus Diceratias with a maximum published standard length for a metamorphosed female of 23.5 cm (9.3 in). This species is distinguished from its congeners by the morphology of its esca, which has a low terminal papilla, has a rear appendage with a series of clearly defined filaments running from the tip downwards and may have a branched front appendage.

== Distribution and habitat ==
Diceratias bispinosus is found in the Indo-Pacific region, it has been recorded in the Bay of Bengal as well as Rowley Shoals off Western Australia in the Indian Ocean. In the Western Pacific Ocean it is found from Japan, Taiwan, the Philippines, the Halmahera and Banda Seas to New Ireland in the Bismarck Archipelago. This is a bathypelagic fish which is found at depths between 533 and 2,306 m (1,749 and 7,566 ft).
