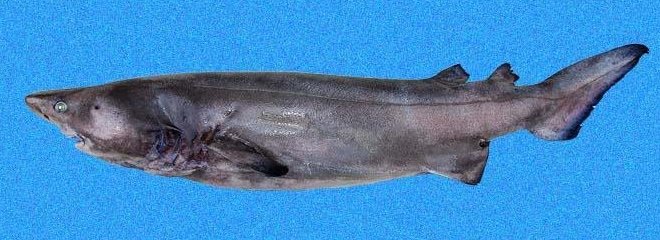
- Prickly shark, Echinorhinus cookei
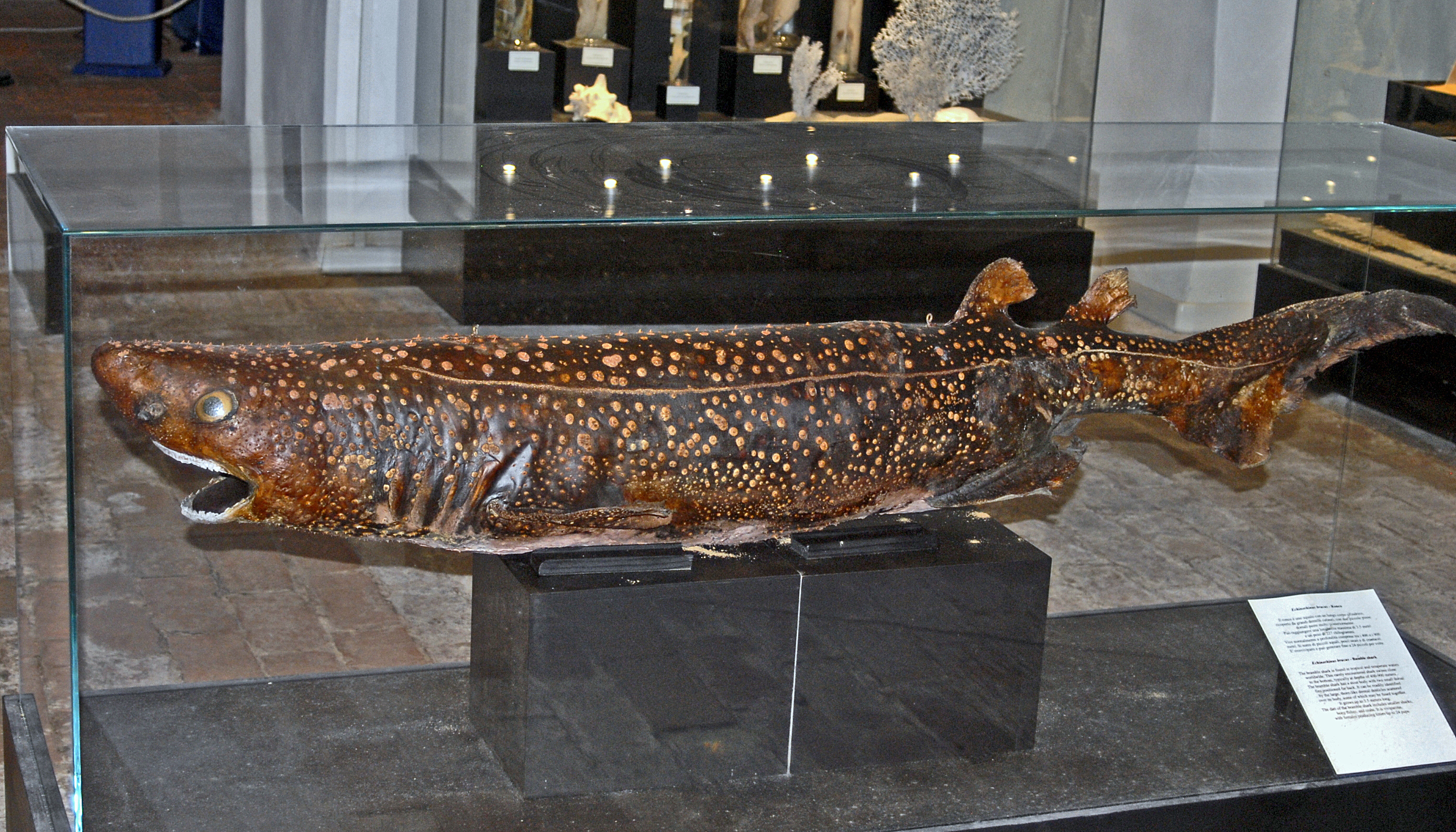
- Bramble shark, Echinorhinus brucus; mounted specimen, Natural History Museum of the University of Pisa

Scientific classification
- Kingdom: Animalia
- Phylum: Chordata
- Class: Chondrichthyes
- Subclass: Elasmobranchii
- Division: Selachii
- Superorder: Squalomorphi
- Series: Squatinida
- Order: Echinorhiniformes de Buen, 1926
- Family: Echinorhinidae; T. N. Gill, 1862
- Genus: Echinorhinus; Blainville, 1816
- The distribution of the two Echinorhinus species

= Echinorhinus =

Echinorhinus Temporal range: Early Cretaceous (Valanginian) to present

Genus of sharks

Echinorhinus is the only extant genus in the family Echinorhinidae, either a family within the large order Squaliformes or their own monotypic order Echinorhiniformes. The two extant species possess enlarged denticles forming prominent spines or thorns on their skin.

== Taxonomy ==
Echinorhinidae are traditionally classified in the order Squaliformes, together with dogfish, kitefin and gulper sharks. However, a phylogenetic analysis based on gene capture data and mitochondrial data suggests that they are not squaliform sharks, but may be more likely to be appropriately classed in their own group, as a sister group to angel sharks and sawsharks. Phylogenetic placement of Echinorhinidae has been ambiguous in morphological and molecular studies, either being included within Squaliformes, considered sister to Squaliformes, or placed in a separate group with sawsharks (Pristiophoriformes) or angel sharks (Squatiniformes). For this reason they are sometimes given their own order, Echinorhiniformes.

== Etymology ==
The name is from Greek echinos meaning "spiny" and rhinos meaning "nose".

== Species ==
Only two extant species are known:

- Echinorhinus brucus Bonnaterre, 1788 (bramble shark)
- Echinorhinus cookei Pietschmann, 1928 (prickly shark)

The following fossil species are also known:

- †Echinorhinus australis (Chapman, 1909)
- †Echinorhinus blakei Agassiz, 1856
- †Echinorhinus caspius Glikman, 1964
- †Echinorhinus eyrensis Pledge, 1992
- †Echinorhinus kelleyi Pfeil, 1983
- †Echinorhinus lapaoi Antunes & Cappetta, 2002
- †Echinorhinus maremagnum Bogan, Agnolin, Otero, Egli, Suárez, Soto-Acuña & Novas, 2017
- †Echinorhinus pfauntschi Pfeil, 1983
- †Echinorhinus pollerspoecki Pfeil, 1983
- †Echinorhinus pozzii Ameghino, 1906
- †Echinorhinus priscus Arambourg, 1952
- †Echinorhinus richiardii Lawley, 1876
- †Echinorhinus schoenfeldi Pfeil, 1983
- †Echinorhinus vielhus Guinot, Cappetta & Adnet, 2014
- †Echinorhinus wadanohanaensis Kitamura, 2013
- †Echinorhinus weltoni Pfeil, 1983

The oldest known species is E. vielhus from the Early Cretaceous (Valanginian) of France.

== Description ==
This genus includes two extant species of uncommon, little-known sharks. Both species are relatively large sharks, at 3.1 to 4.0 m (10.2 to 13.1 ft) in body length. They are characterized by a short nose and by rough, thornlike dermal denticles scattered over its body, some of which may be fused together. They have no anal fin. Two small spineless dorsal fins are positioned far back.

== Biology ==
They are ovoviviparous, with the mother retaining the egg-cases inside her body until they hatch, producing litters up to 24 pups. They feed on smaller sharks, smaller bony fish, and on crabs and cephalopods.

== Distribution ==
These sharks are found worldwide in cold temperate to tropical seas from the surface down to 900 m (3,000 ft).

== See also ==
- List of prehistoric cartilaginous fish genera
- List of fish families
