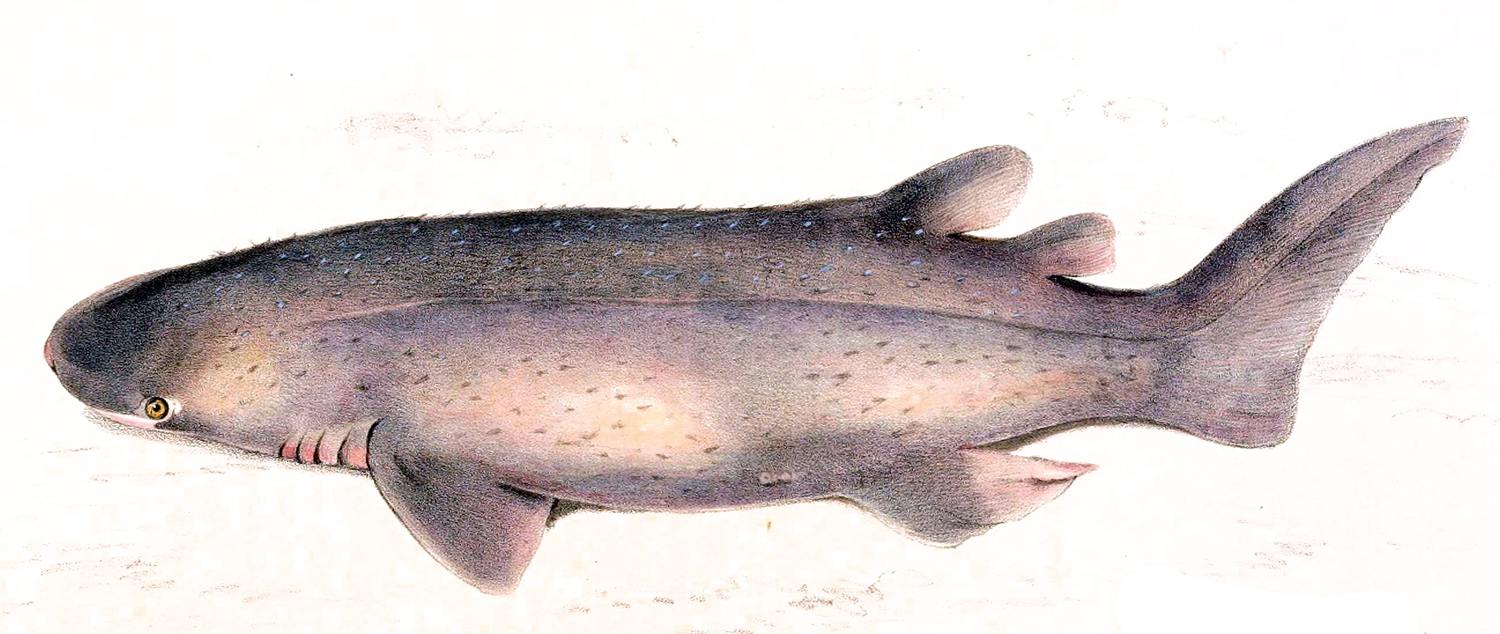
- Echinorhinus brucus, illustration of the zoology of South Africa (1838)
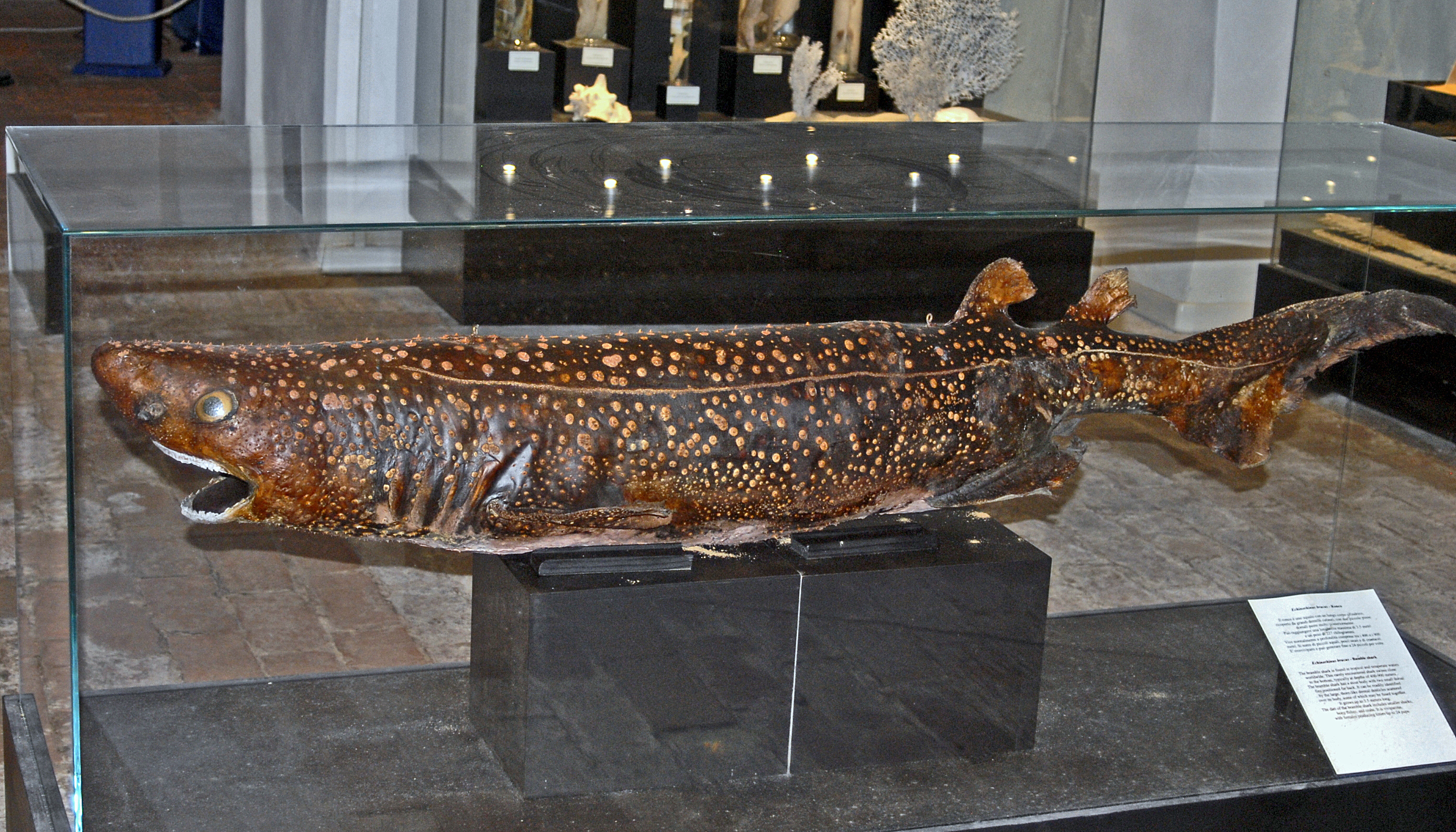
- Echinorhinus brucus, mounted specimen.

Conservation status
- Endangered (IUCN 3.1)

Scientific classification
- Kingdom: Animalia
- Phylum: Chordata
- Class: Chondrichthyes
- Subclass: Elasmobranchii
- Division: Selachii
- Order: Echinorhiniformes
- Family: Echinorhinidae
- Genus: Echinorhinus
- Species: E. brucus

Binomial name
- Echinorhinus brucus (Bonnaterre, 1788)
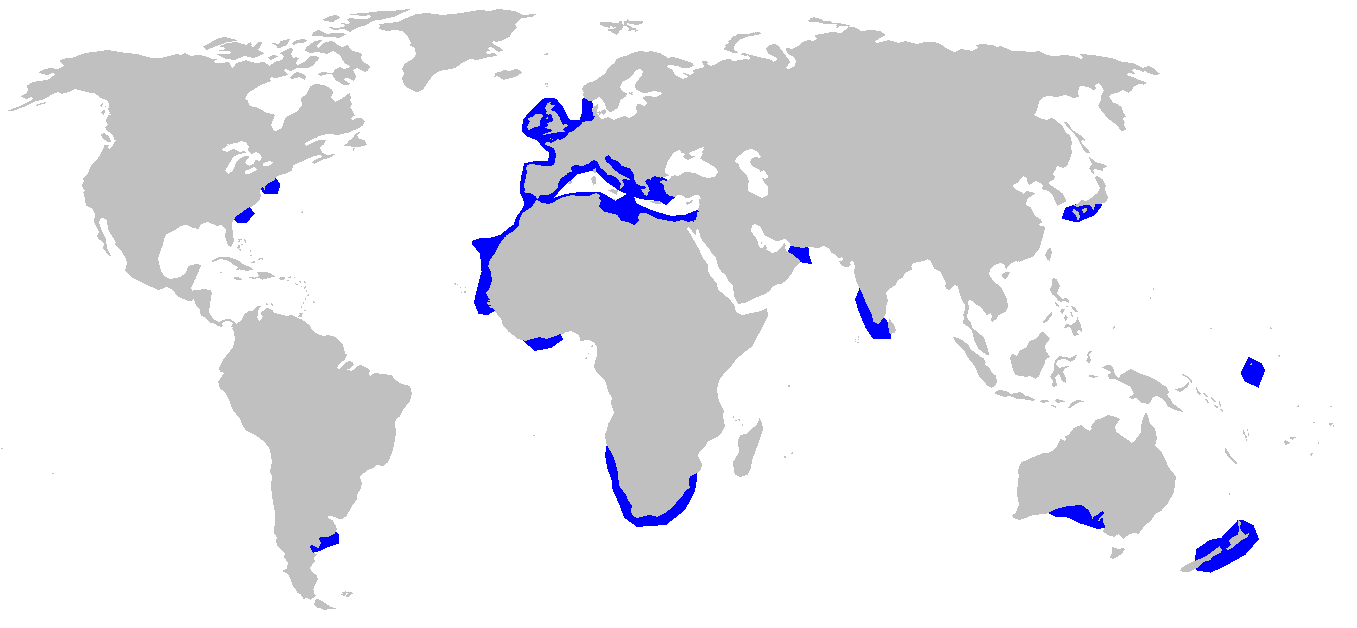
- Range of the bramble shark

Synonyms
- Echinorhinus mccoyi Whitley, 1931; Echinorhinus obesus Smith, 1838; Squalus brucus Bonnaterre, 1788; Squalus spinosus Gmelin, 1789

= Bramble shark =

Species of shark

The bramble shark (Echinorhinus brucus) is one of the two species of sharks in the family Echinorhinidae. Aside from the eastern Pacific Ocean, it is found in tropical and temperate waters worldwide. This rarely encountered shark swims close to the bottom of the seafloor, typically at depths of 400–900 m (1,300–3,000 ft), though it may enter much shallower water. The bramble shark has a stout body with two small dorsal fins positioned far back and no anal fin. It can be readily identified by the large, thornlike dermal denticles scattered over its body, some of which may be fused together. It is purplish brown or black in color and grows up to 3.1 m (10 ft) long.

The diet of the bramble shark includes smaller sharks, bony fishes, and crabs, which this slow-moving species may capture via suction. It is aplacental viviparous, with females producing litters of 15–52 pups. Harmless to humans, it is an occasional bycatch of commercial and recreational fishers, and may be used for fishmeal and liver oil. Its population has declined substantially in the northeastern Atlantic since the 18th and 19th centuries, likely because of overfishing.

== Taxonomy ==
The original description of the bramble shark was authored by French naturalist Pierre Joseph Bonnaterre in the 1788 Tableau encyclopédique et méthodique des trois regnes de la nature. He named it Squalus brucus, from the Greek brux or bruchios meaning "from the depths of the sea". The type specimen has since been lost. In 1816, Henri de Blainville created the genus Echinorhinus for this species. Until the 1960s, specimens of the prickly shark (E. cookei) caught in the Pacific Ocean were misidentified as bramble sharks. Other common names for this species are spinous shark and spiny shark.

== Description ==
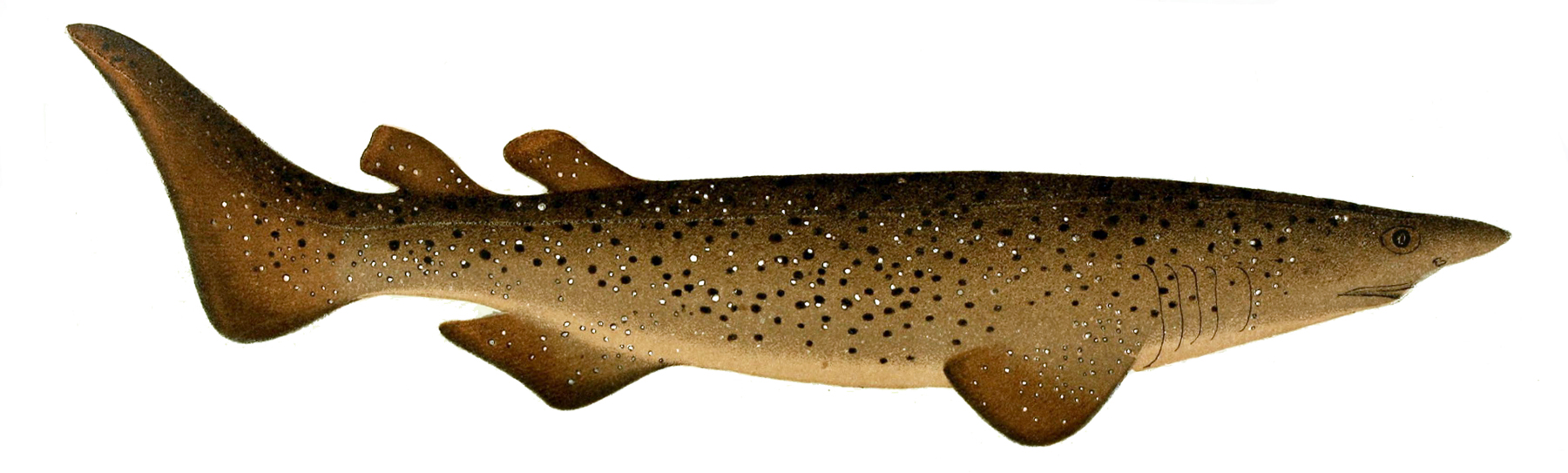

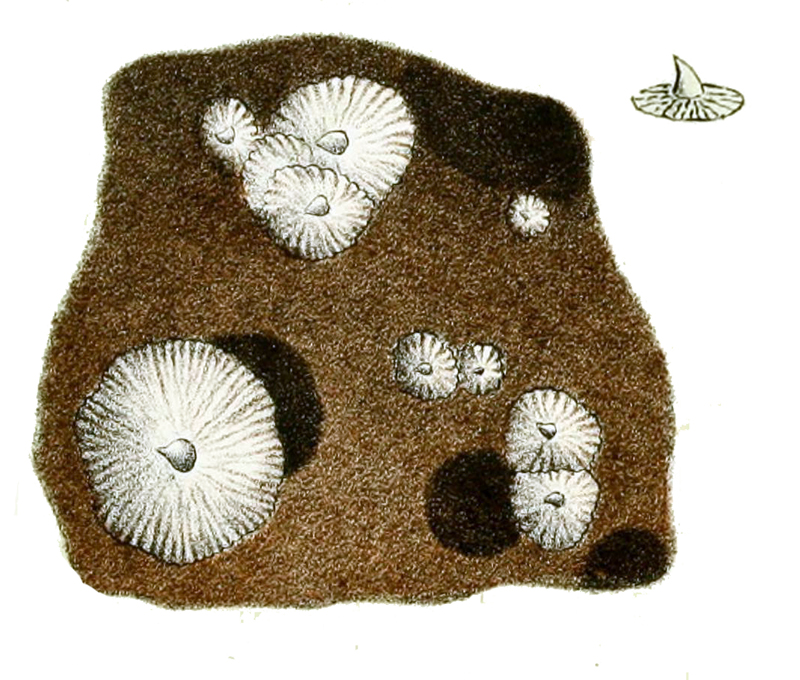
Distinctive traits of the bramble shark include its posteriorly placed dorsal fins, lack of an anal fin, and large thornlike dermal denticles (detail below).

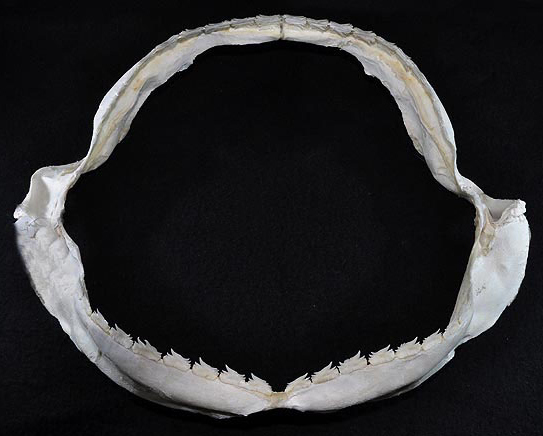
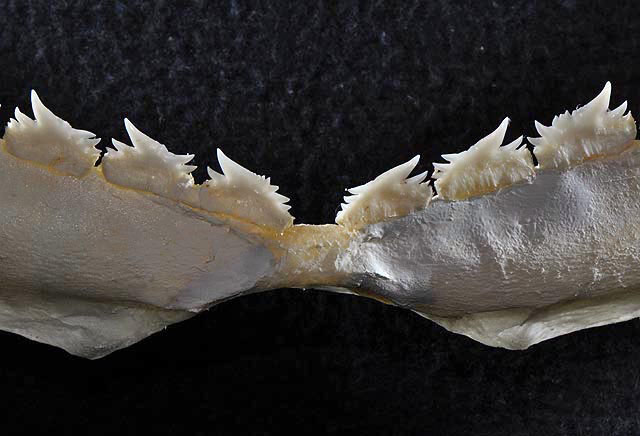

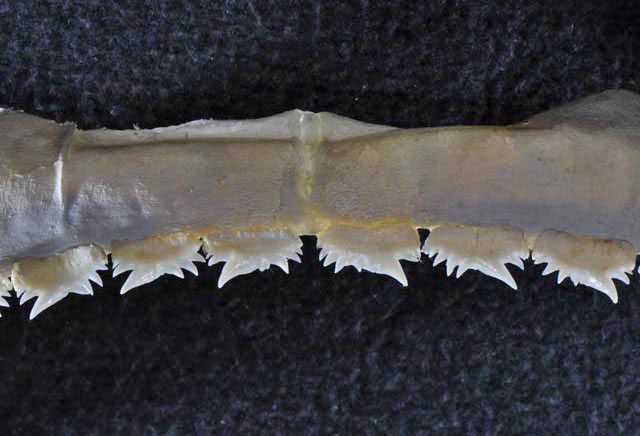
Jaws, lower and upper teeth

The bramble shark has a thick, cylindrical body and a somewhat flattened head. The snout is blunt and shorter than the width of the mouth, with widely spaced nostrils that are preceded by small flaps of skin. The eyes lack nictitating membranes; the tiny spiracles are located well behind them. Live specimens have greenish coloured eyes. The wide, curved mouth bears very short furrows at the corners. There are 20–26 upper and 22–26 lower tooth rows; each tooth is knife-like, with a single main cusp and up to three cusplets on either side. There are five pairs of gill slits, with the fifth pair the longest.

The pectoral fins are short and angular, while the pelvic fins are long and relatively large. The dorsal fins are small, with the first dorsal fin origin lying behind the pelvic fin origins. The dorsal fins are spineless and are set less than a fin length's apart from one another. There is no anal fin. The caudal peduncle is robust and lacks notches at the caudal fin origins. The asymmetrical caudal fin has an indistinct lower lobe and an upper lobe without a notch in the trailing margin.

The skin is covered by a layer of foul-smelling mucus several millimeters thick. The dermal denticles are scattered irregularly over the body and vary greatly in size, measuring up to 1.5 cm (0.59 in) across. Each denticle is thornlike in shape, with ridges radiating out from the central point over the base. As many as ten denticles may be fused together to form multi-pointed plates. The underside of the snout and the area around the mouth is densely covered by small denticles in sharks under 90 cm (35 in) long; these denticles become larger and sparser in larger sharks. This species is brown to black above, with a metallic purplish hue, and paler below; some individuals have red or black blotches. There is a report of one specimen that had a greenish glow when freshly caught. The bramble shark may reach 3.1 m (10 ft) in length. The maximum weight on record is 200 kg (440 lb) for a 2.8 m (9.2 ft) long female.

== Distribution and habitat ==
Records of the bramble shark are fairly rare and originate from widely scattered locations in tropical and temperate waters worldwide, save for the eastern Pacific Ocean. Most have come from the eastern Atlantic and western Indian Oceans, where its range extends from the North Sea and the British Isles to southern Mozambique, including the Mediterranean Sea. In the western Atlantic, this species is represented by a handful of specimens from Massachusetts, North Carolina, Louisiana, Tobago, Brazil, and Argentina. In the Indo-Pacific, it is known from Oman, India, southern Japan, southern Australia, New Zealand, and possibly Kiribati.

Found close to the sea floor, the bramble shark most commonly inhabits continental and insular shelves and slopes at depths of 400–900 m (1,300–3,000 ft). However, it has been reported from as shallow as 18 m (59 ft), in areas with upwellings of cold water, and from as deep as 1,214 m (3,983 ft). At least in European waters, this species may migrate into shallower depths of 20–200 m (66–656 ft) during the summer.

== Biology and ecology ==
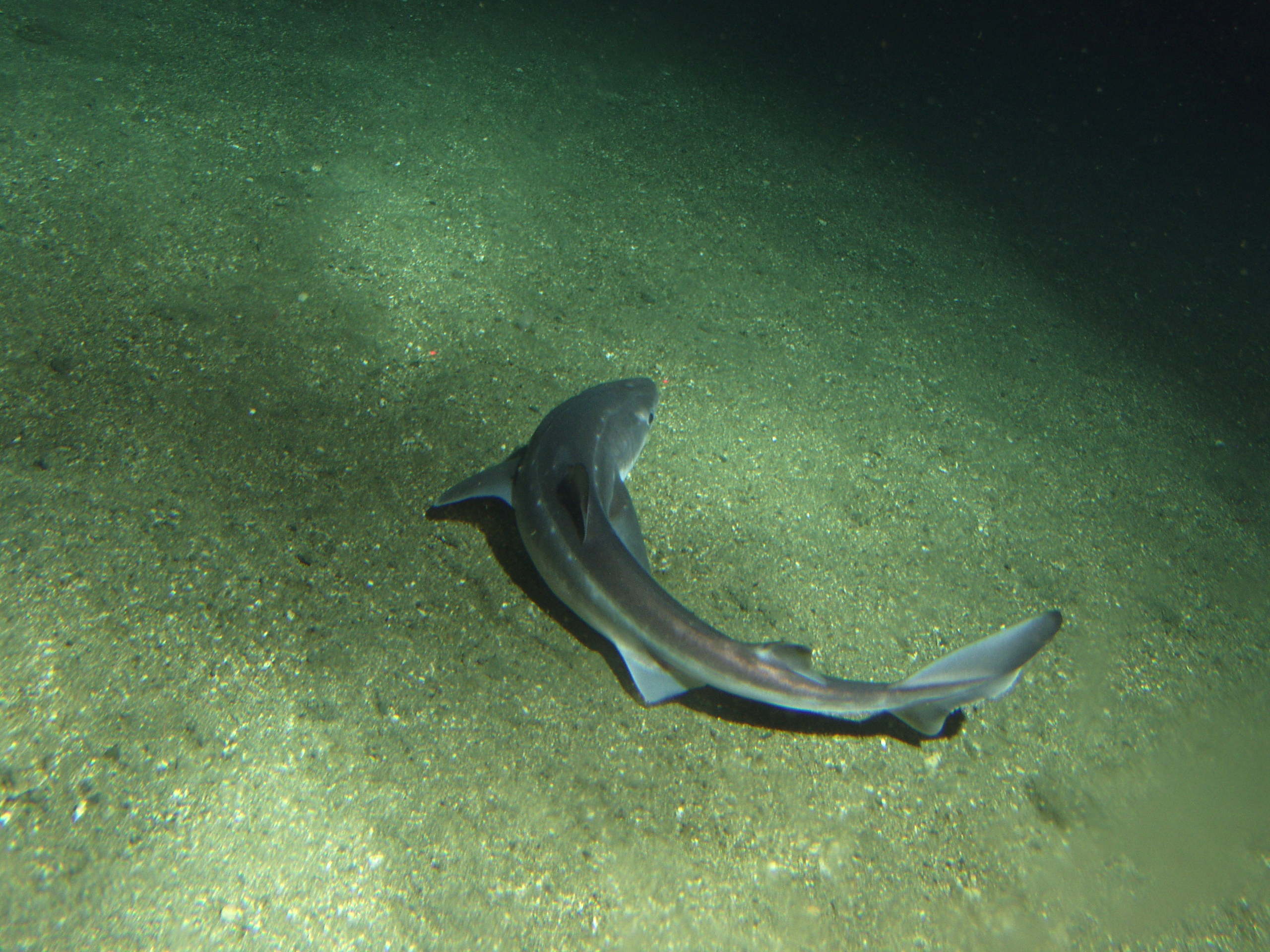
The spiny dogfish (pictured) is a known prey item of the bramble shark.

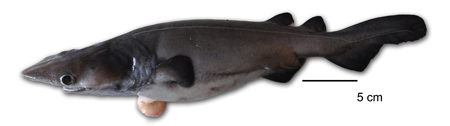
Bramble shark embryo with external yolk sac.

Sluggish in nature, the bramble shark feeds on smaller sharks (including the spiny dogfish, Squalus acanthias), bony fishes (including ling, catfishes, and lizardfishes), and crabs. The large size of its pharynx, relative to its mouth, suggests that it may capture prey by suction. This species is aplacental viviparous; females have two functional ovaries and two uteruses. Recorded litter sizes have ranged from 15 to 52, and newly born pups have been estimated to measure 40–50 cm (16–20 in) long. The size of litters has been observed to vary by region. The dermal denticles in near-term embryos are underdeveloped, appearing as minute spines located within open pits in the skin. The size at sexual maturity is uncertain; the smallest known mature males and females are 1.5 m (4.9 ft) and 2.1 m (6.9 ft) long respectively.

== Human interactions ==
The bramble shark is not known to pose a danger to humans. It is caught incidentally by commercial fisheries in bottom trawls and on fishing line, as well as by sport anglers. In the eastern Atlantic, this species is processed into fishmeal but has little commercial significance. The Bramble Shark's liver oil was found to be rich in squalene, fatty acids, and vitamins A, D, and K actively making it a dietary supplement. Its liver oil is highly valued in South Africa as medicine, whereas in India the oil is considered poor and is used to coat canoes to discourage woodboring beetles. Historical accounts suggest that bramble shark numbers in the northeastern Atlantic have fallen markedly since the 18th and 19th centuries, such as that it is now extremely rare off northern Europe and in the Mediterranean. This decline has been attributed to fishing pressure, to which this species may be highly vulnerable as large, deep-sea sharks generally have slow growth rates and long lifespans. Regarding the species as a whole, the International Union for Conservation of Nature (IUCN) assesses it as Endangered. In June 2018 the New Zealand Department of Conservation classified the bramble shark as "At Risk – Naturally Uncommon" with the qualifiers "Data Poor" and "Secure Overseas" under the New Zealand Threat Classification System.
