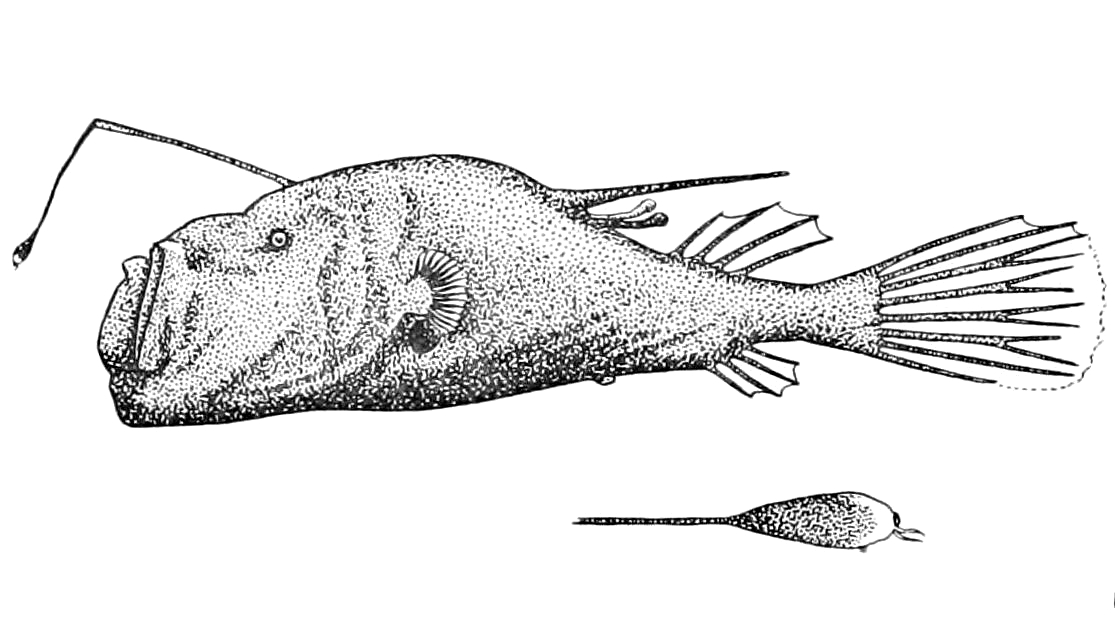

Conservation status
- Least Concern (IUCN 3.1)

Scientific classification
- Kingdom: Animalia
- Phylum: Chordata
- Class: Actinopterygii
- Order: Lophiiformes
- Family: Ceratiidae
- Genus: Ceratias
- Species: C. tentaculatus

Binomial name
- Ceratias tentaculatus (Norman, 1930)

Synonyms
- Mancalias tentaculatus Norman, 1930; Ceratias holboelli tentaculatus (Norman, 1930); Mancalias bifilis Regan & Trewavas, 1932

= Ceratias tentaculatus =

Species of fish

Ceratias tentaculatus, the southern seadevil, is a species of marine ray-finned fish belonging to the family Ceratiidae, the warty seadevils. This is bathydemersal species which can be found at depths ranging from 100 to 2,900 metres (330 to 9,510 ft). It is restricted to the Southern Hemisphere.

== Taxonomy ==
Ceratias tentaculatus was first formally described in 1930 as Mancalias tentaculatus by the English ichthyologist John Roxborough Norman with its type locality given as the South Atlantic Ocean at 52°25'S, 9°50'E from a depth of 650 to 700 m (2,130 to 2,300 ft). The genus Ceratias is classified by the 5th edition of Fishes of the World as belonging to the family Ceratiidae in the suborder Ceratioidei of the anglerfish order Lophiiformes.

== Etymology ==
Ceratias tentaculatus belongs to the genus Ceratias, this name means "horn bearer", an allusion to the esca sticking up from the snout. The specific name tentaculatus means "tentacule", i.e. a small tentacle, this is assumed to be an allusion to the two small tentacles on the escal bulb that Norman described as "small and almost transparent".

== Description ==
Ceratias tentaculatus is sexually dimorphic and the metamorphosed females can be distinguished from the metamorphosed females of other species in the genus Ceratias by the morphology of its dark coloured esca which has two appendages at the tip of its bulb, these appendages are almost always forked or branched. The esca is on an illicium which has a length equivalent to 19.1% to 28.5% of the standard length of the fish. The pore of the esca is located at the apex of its bulb, and is slightly elecated on a pigmented papilla in all specimens with a standard length in excess of 75 mm (3.0 in). There are teeth on the vomer of all known specimens. This species has a maximum published total length of 88 cm (35 in).

== Distribution and habitat ==
Ceratias tentaculatus has a circumglobal distribution in the Southern Ocean, where most of the specimens were taken between 35° and 68° S. Smaller specimens have also been collected from Saldanha Bay on the Atlantic Coast of the Western Cape of South Africa north to Delagoa Bay in Mozambique, in the Indian Ocean. It has been collected from depths between 100 and 2,900 m (330 and 9,510 ft), but it typically is found between 650 and 1,500 m (2,130 and 4,920 ft).
