= Bufoceratias microcephalus =

Conservation status
- Data Deficient (IUCN 3.1)

Scientific classification
- Kingdom: Animalia
- Phylum: Chordata
- Class: Actinopterygii
- Order: Lophiiformes
- Family: Diceratiidae
- Genus: Bufoceratias
- Species: B. microcephalus

Binomial name
- Bufoceratias microcephalus H. C. Ho, Kawai & Amaoka, 2016

Species of fish

Bufoceratias microcephalus, the small-head toady seadevil, is a species of deep sea marine ray-finned fish belonging to the family Diceratiidae, the double anglers. This is a bathypelagic species which is known only from its holotype which was taken from a depth between 755 and 770 m (2,477 and 2,526 ft) in the eastern Indian Ocean off the coast of Java at 8°31.3'S, 110°25.0'E - 8°30.8'S, 110°23.6'E.
