= Bufoceratias thele =

Conservation status
- Least Concern (IUCN 3.1)

Scientific classification
- Kingdom: Animalia
- Phylum: Chordata
- Class: Actinopterygii
- Order: Lophiiformes
- Family: Diceratiidae
- Genus: Bufoceratias
- Species: B. thele

Binomial name
- Bufoceratias thele Uwate, 1979

Species of fish

Bufoceratias thele is a species of double angler, a type of anglerfish. The fish is bathypelagic and has been found at depths ranging from 0 to 1,500 metres (0 to 4,921 ft). It is endemic to the western Pacific Ocean.
