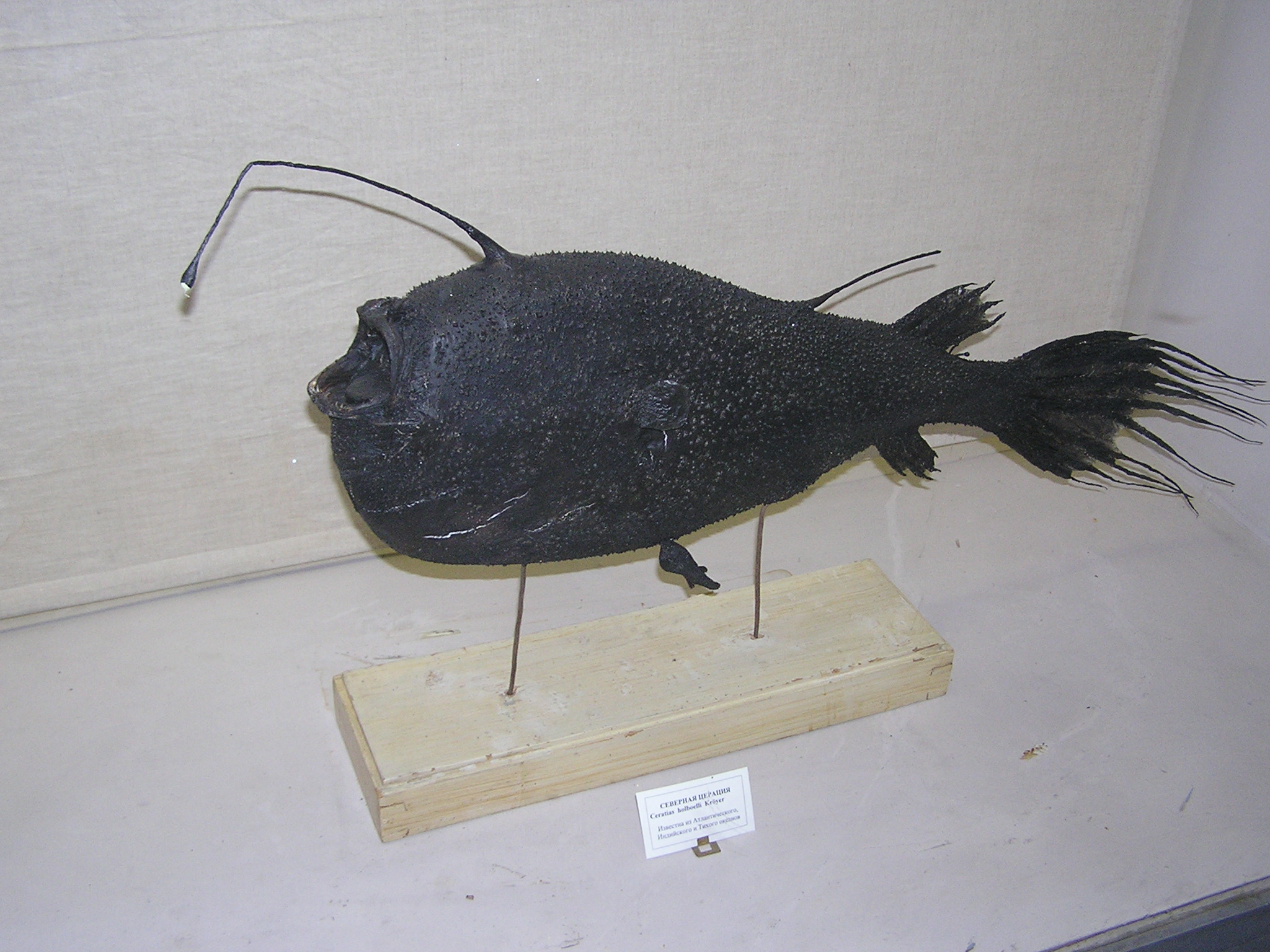
- Female with a parasitic male on the belly, preparation at the Zoological Museum of Saint Petersburg

Conservation status
- Least Concern (IUCN 3.1)

Scientific classification
- Kingdom: Animalia
- Phylum: Chordata
- Class: Actinopterygii
- Order: Lophiiformes
- Family: Ceratiidae
- Genus: Ceratias
- Species: C. holboelli

Binomial name
- Ceratias holboelli Krøyer, 1845

Synonyms
- Reganichthys giganteus Bigelow & Barbour, 1944; Reganula giganteus (Bigelow & Barbour, 1944)

= Krøyer's deep sea angler fish =

Species of fish

Krøyer's deep sea angler fish (Ceratias holboelli), also known as the deep-sea angler, longray seadevil or northern seadevil, is a species of marine ray-finned fish belonging to the family Ceratiidae, the warty seadevils. It is found throughout the oceans of the world, from tropical to polar seas. It is the largest species in its family.

== Taxonomy ==
Krøyer's deep sea angler fish was first formally described in 1845 by the Danish zoologist Henrik Nikolai Krøyer with its type locality given as Southern Greenland. When he described Ceratias holboelli Krøyer also proposed a new monospecific genus for his new species, meaning that this species is the type species of the genus Ceratias by monotypy. In 1861 Theodore Gill proposed the monotypic subfamily Ceratiinae of the family Lophiidae. The 5th edition of Fishes of the World classifies the family Ceratiidae in the suborder Ceratioidei of the anglerfish order Lophiiformes.

== Etymology ==
Krøyer's deep sea angler fish belongs to the genus Ceratias, which means "horn bearer", an allusion to the esca sticking up from the snout. The specific name honours the Danish naval officer, entomologist and botanist Carl Peter Holbøll.

== Description ==
Krøyer's deep sea angler fish is unique within its family in having a single appendage at the tip of its escal bulb. The length of the illicium is equivalent to 14.5% to 37.8% of the standard length of the fish. The vomer has between 1 and 3 teeth on either side and these are nearly always present in adults with a length of less than 80 mm (3.1 in) but usually absent in larger specimens. The lower part of the bulb of the esca is dark and tapers into the illicium; the upper part is oval with a single appendage. This appendage emerges just in front of the escal pore and is typically a single filament, but may have additional filaments. This species has a maximum published total length of 120 cm (47 in), the largest of the Ceratiidae.

== Distribution and habitat ==
Krøyer's deep sea angler fish has a circumglobal distribution, it is found in the mesopelagic and bathypelagic zones. It has been found off Brazil in the Western Atlantic. It has also been recorded from southern Tasmania, New Zealand, New South Wales and the Coral and Celebes seas, the Bismarck Archipelago, Solomon Islands, off Taiwan, Japan, in the Bering Sea, the Aleutian Islands, off Oregon and California, the Hawaiian Islands, and east as far as the Peru-Chile Trench in the Pacific. In the Indian Ocean, it has been collected from Durban in South Africa and the Arabian Sea. This species appear to be absent from the Southern Ocean. In the northeastern Atlantic it is known to occur from Iceland at about 68° N, south to around 8° S in the central Atlantic. This species has been found at depths between 150 and 3,400 m (490 and 11,150 ft) but it is most commonly collected between 400 and 2,000 m (1,300 and 6,600 ft)>

== Biology ==
Krøyer's deep sea angler fish shows extreme sexual dimorphism. The metamorphosed females have a maximum standard length of 77 cm (30 in), while that of males is 14.5 cm (5.7 in). The females use the illicium and escal bulb to lure prey. The males possess highly developed sensory organs that they use to find females; once a female is found, the male attaches itself to the female's body as a sexual parasite, eventually becoming incorporated into the female's tissues and blood vessels. The females are oviparous and the larvae are planktonic. The spawn is laid in gelatinous rafts and these float to the upper water column and are found from the surface to 200 m (660 ft).
