= Echinorhinus wadanohanaensis =

Echinorhinus wadanohanaensis Temporal range: Santonian

Scientific classification
- Kingdom: Animalia
- Phylum: Chordata
- Class: Chondrichthyes
- Subclass: Elasmobranchii
- Division: Selachii
- Order: Echinorhiniformes
- Family: Echinorhinidae
- Genus: Echinorhinus
- Species: †E. wadanohanaensis

Binomial name
- †Echinorhinus wadanohanaensis Kitamura, 2013

Extinct species of shark

Echinorhinus wadanohanaensis is an extinct species of Echinorhinus that lived during the Santonian stage of the Late Cretaceous epoch.

== Distribution ==
Echinorhinus wadanohanaensis is known from the Hinoshima Formation of Kumamoto Prefecture.
