= Diceratias pileatus =

Conservation status
- Least Concern (IUCN 3.1)

Scientific classification
- Kingdom: Animalia
- Phylum: Chordata
- Class: Actinopterygii
- Order: Lophiiformes
- Family: Diceratiidae
- Genus: Diceratias
- Species: D. pileatus

Binomial name
- Diceratias pileatus Uwate, 1979

Species of fish

Diceratias pileatus is a species of deep sea marine ray-finned fish belonging to the family Diceratiidae, the double anglers. The fish is bathypelagic and has been found at depths ranging from 640 to 1,430 metres (2,100 to 4,690 ft). This species was thought to be endemic to the Atlantic Ocean but has now been recorded Indo-Pacific region.
