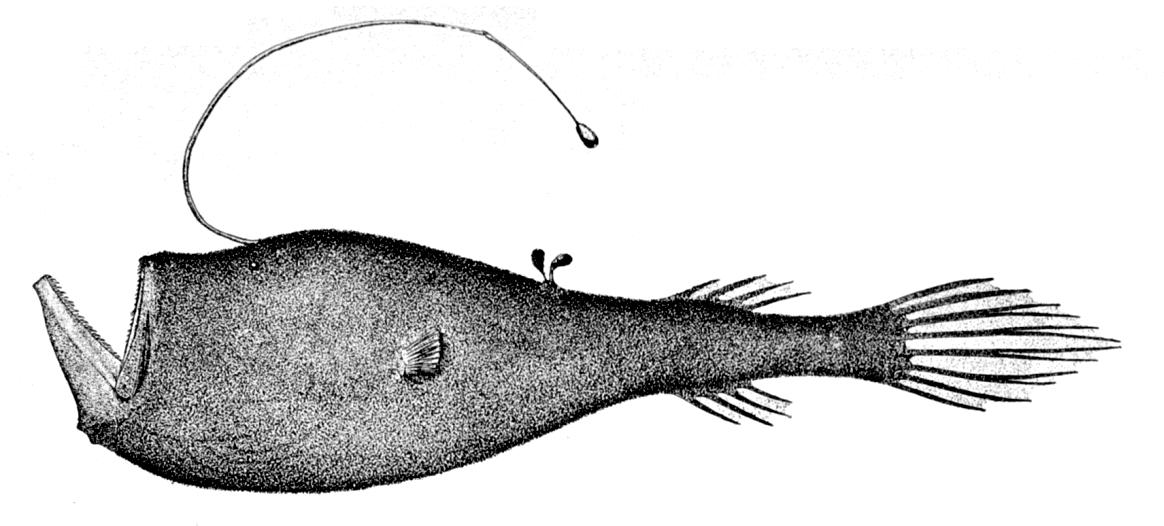

Conservation status
- Least Concern (IUCN 3.1)

Scientific classification
- Kingdom: Animalia
- Phylum: Chordata
- Class: Actinopterygii
- Order: Lophiiformes
- Family: Ceratiidae
- Genus: Ceratias
- Species: C. uranoscopus

Binomial name
- Ceratias uranoscopus Murray, 1877

Synonyms
- Typlopsaras shufeldti Gill, 1883; Mancalias xenistius Regan & Trewavas, 1932; Mancalias uranoscopus triflos Roule & Angel, 1933; Mancalias sessilis Imai, 1941; Mancalias kroyeri Koefoed, 1944

= Ceratias uranoscopus =

Species of fish

Ceratias uranoscopus, the stargazing seadevil, is a species of marine ray-finned fish belonging to the family Ceratiidae, the warty sea devils. The fish is both bathypelagic and mesopelagic and can typically be found at depths ranging from 500 to 1,000 metres (1,640 to 3,280 ft). It is endemic to tropical waters and can be found in the Atlantic, Pacific, and Indian Oceans.

== Taxonomy ==
Ceratias uranoscopus was first formally described in 1877 by the Scottish-Canadian oceanographer Sir John Murray with its type locality given as the Northeastern Atlantic Ocean, between Canary and Cape Verde islands at 22°18'N, 22°02'W from a depth between 0 and 4,392 m (0 and 14,410 ft). The genus Ceratias is classified by the 5th edition of Fishes of the World as belonging to the family Ceratiidae in the suborder Ceratioidei of the anglerfish order Lophiiformes.

== Etymology ==
Ceratias uranoscopus belongs to the genus Ceratias, this name means "horn bearer", an allusion to the esca sticking up from the snout. The specific name uranoscopus means is a combination of urano, meaning "sky", with scopus, meaning "watcher", an allusion to the eyes being positioned high on the head.

== Description ==
Ceratias uranoscopus is sexually dimorphic, and the metamorphosed females can be distinguished from the metamorphosed females of other species in the genus Ceratias by the morphology of its esca, which is dark in colour, except for its unpigmented tip. The esca has no appendages and the illicium has a length equivalent to 14% to 28.8% of the fish's standard length. Vomerine teeth are always absent. This species has a maximum published total length of 24 cm (9.4 in).

== Distribution and habitat ==
Ceratias uranoscopus is found in the Pacific and Atlantic Oceans, where it has been collected widely, but only two specimens have been collected in the Indian Ocean. It is a mesopelagic and bathypelagic species found at depths between 95 and 4,000 m (310 and 13,120 ft), although specimens are typically collected between 500 and 1,000 m (1,600 and 3,300 ft).
