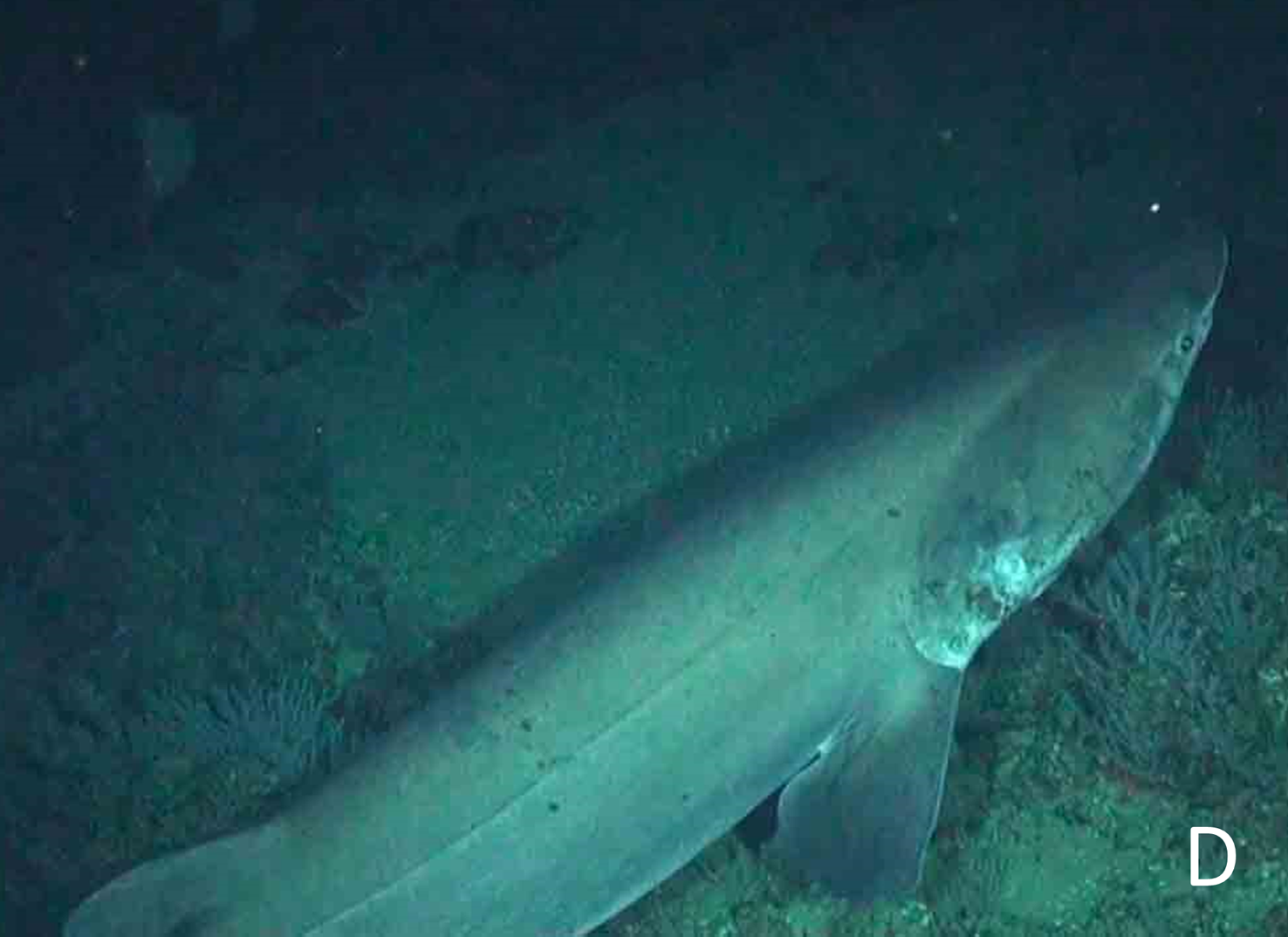
- Live specimen
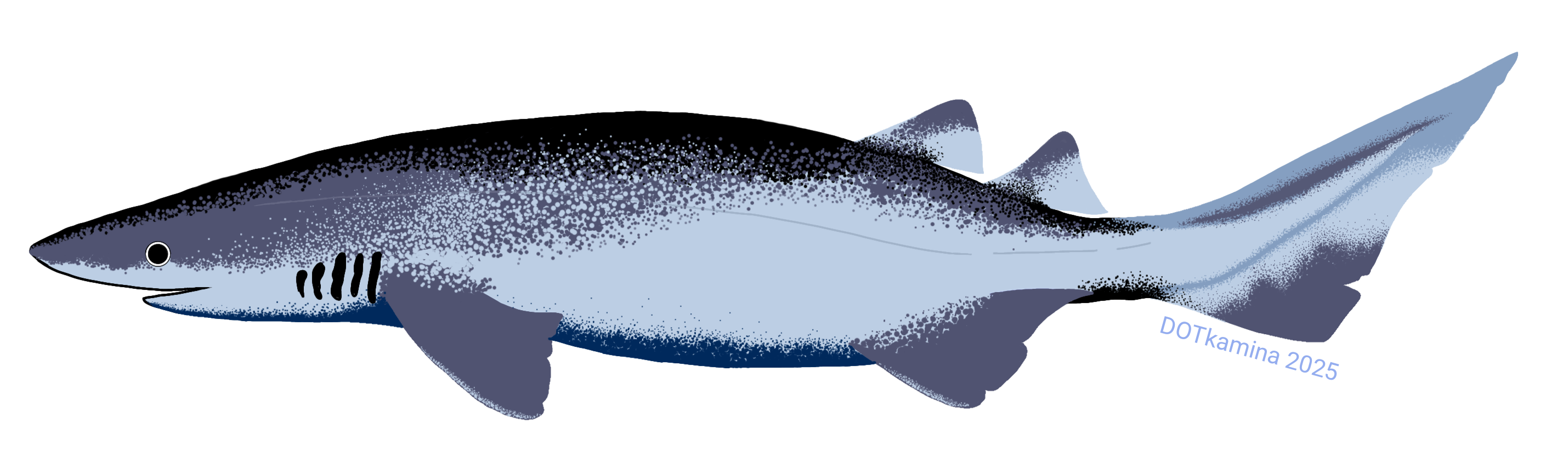
- Illustration of a live prickly shark

Conservation status
- Data Deficient (IUCN 3.1)

Scientific classification
- Kingdom: Animalia
- Phylum: Chordata
- Class: Chondrichthyes
- Subclass: Elasmobranchii
- Division: Selachii
- Order: Echinorhiniformes
- Family: Echinorhinidae
- Genus: Echinorhinus
- Species: E. cookei

Binomial name
- Echinorhinus cookei Pietschmann, 1928
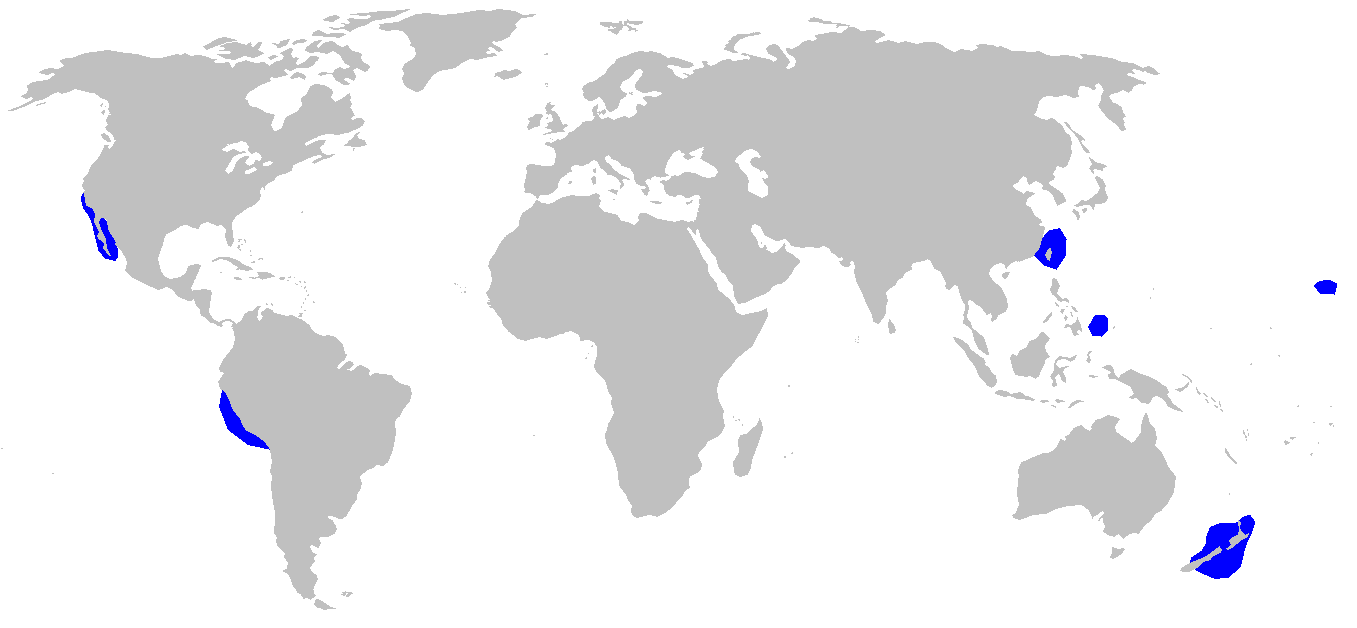
- Range of the prickly shark

= Prickly shark =

Species of shark

The prickly shark (Echinorhinus cookei) is one of the two species of sharks in the family Echinorhinidae (the other one is the bramble shark), found in the Pacific Ocean over continental and insular shelves and slopes, and in submarine canyons. Bottom-dwelling in nature, it generally inhabits cool waters 100–650 m (330–2,130 ft) deep, but it also frequently enters shallower water in areas such as Monterey Bay off California. This stocky, dark-colored shark grows up to 4.0 m (13.1 ft) long, with two small dorsal fins positioned far back on its body and no anal fin. It is characterized by a dense covering of thornlike dermal denticles, hence its common name.

Nocturnally active, the prickly shark rests during the day in deeper offshore waters and performs a diel migration to shallower inshore waters at dusk. Individual sharks have a small home range and tend to remain within a given local area. This species consumes a variety of bony and cartilaginous fishes, and cephalopods. Since it moves slowly, it may use suction to capture prey. It is aplacental viviparous, with females producing sizable litters. The prickly shark is not known to be dangerous to humans and has minimal economic value. It is caught incidentally by commercial deepwater fisheries, which are expanding and may potentially threaten its population. Thus, the International Union for Conservation of Nature (IUCN) has assessed this species as Data Deficient.

== Taxonomy ==
Austrian ichthyologist Viktor Pietschmann described the prickly shark as a new species in two separate publications: a brief German account in a 1928 volume of Anzeiger der Akademie der Wissenschaften in Wien and a more detailed English account in a 1930 volume of Bernice P. Bishop Museum Bulletin. Pietschmann named the shark in honor of Charles Montague Cooke Jr., a conchologist at the Bishop Museum. However, prickly sharks were continually misidentified as bramble sharks (E. brucus) and referred to as such in scientific literature until 1960, when Jack Garrick redescribed the species. Since the original holotype from Kauai, Hawaii had been lost, Garrick designated a 2.0 m (6.6 ft) long male from Palliser Bay, New Zealand as a new type specimen. Other common names for this species include Cook's bramble shark and spinous shark.

== Description ==
The prickly shark has a flabby and cylindrical body, with the adults markedly bulkier than juveniles, and a short, moderately flattened head. The nostrils are placed far apart and preceded by small flaps of skin. The spiracles are tiny and positioned well behind the eyes, which lack nictitating membranes. The mouth forms a broad arch, with very short furrows at the corners. There are 21–25 and 20–27 tooth rows in the upper and lower jaws respectively. The knife-like teeth each have a strongly angled main cusp flanked by up to three smaller cusplets on either side; the lateral cusplets are absent in young sharks. There are five pairs of gill slits, with the fifth pair the longest.

The lateral line runs along each side of body in a conspicuous furrow. The pectoral fins are short, while the pelvic fins are relatively large with long bases. The first dorsal fin is small and originates at or behind the level of the pelvic fin origins; the second dorsal fin is similar to the first and positioned close behind. The anal fin is absent, and the stout caudal peduncle lacks depressions at the caudal fin origins. The caudal fin has a longer upper lobe without a notch in the trailing margin, and an indistinct lower lobe. The skin has a dense, uniform covering of non-overlapping dermal denticles measuring up to 0.4 cm (0.16 in) across, which are never fused together as in the bramble shark. Each denticle is thornlike, with strong ridges running down the central spine and radiating out over the star-shaped base. The denticles beneath the snout are very fine in adults. The prickly shark is plain brown or gray, often with a purplish tint, and has black trailing margins on the fins. The underside is paler, most obviously on the snout and around the mouth. It may reach a length of 4.0 m (13.1 ft). The maximum recorded weight is 266 kg (586 lb) for a 3.1 m (10 ft) long female.

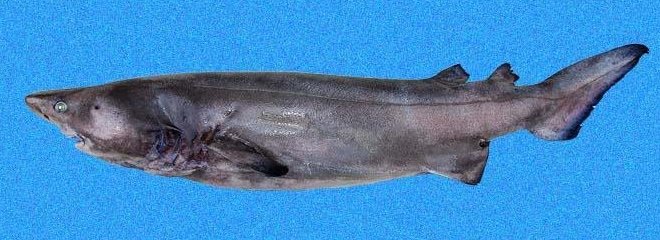
Dead specimen

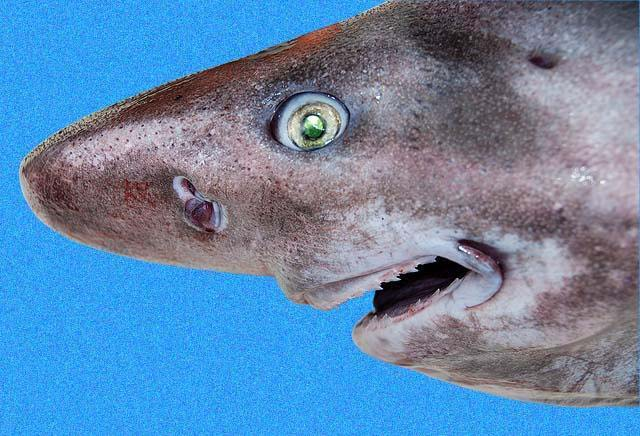
Head, side view

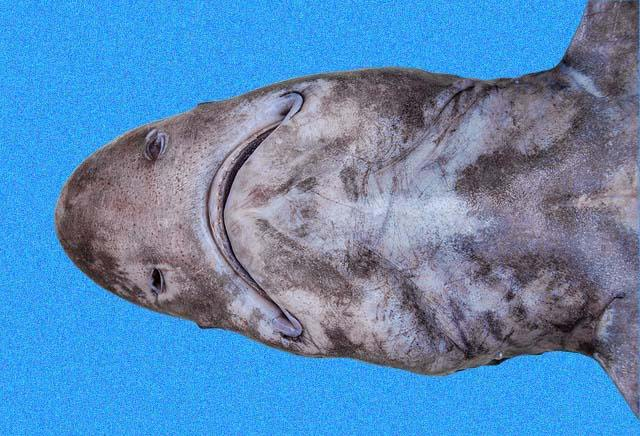
Head, bottom view
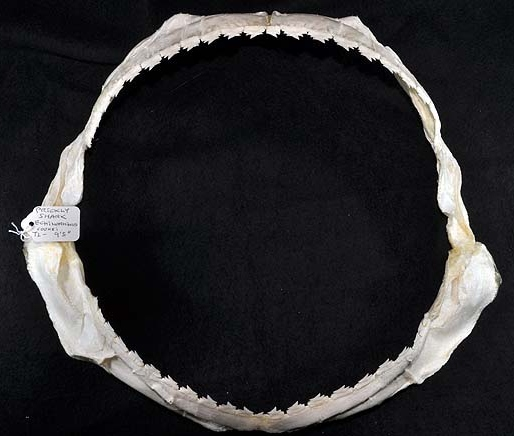
Jaws

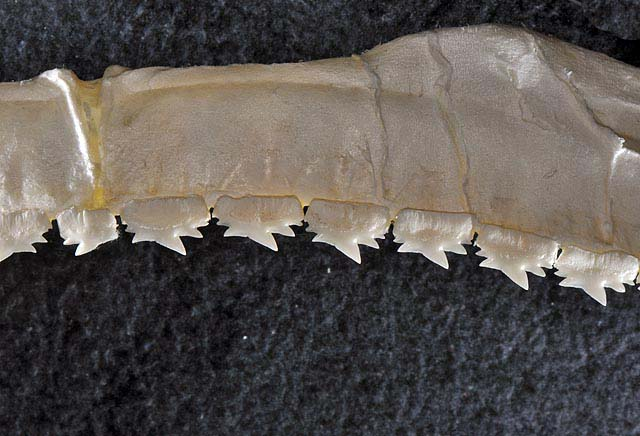
Upper teeth

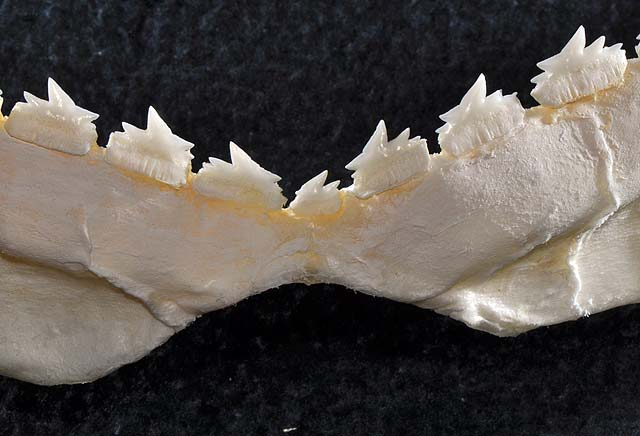
Lower teeth

== Distribution and habitat ==
The prickly shark is widely distributed around the Pacific Ocean. In the western and central Pacific, it has been reported off Japan, Taiwan, Victoria and Queensland in Australia, and New Zealand, as well as around the islands of Palau, New Caledonia, Tonga, Hawaii, and possibly the Gilberts. In the eastern Pacific, it is known to occur from Oregon to El Salvador (including the Gulf of California), around the Cocos and Galapagos Islands, and off Peru and Chile. This species generally seems to be uncommon; an exception is in Monterey Canyon off California, where sharks of both sexes are abundant throughout the year.

Favoring cooler temperatures of 5.5–11 °C (41.9–51.8 °F), the prickly shark is mostly found below depths of 100–200 m (330–660 ft), particularly in the tropics. It has been recorded from at least 650 m (2,130 ft) down and may occur much deeper, possibly to 1,500 m (4,900 ft). On the other hand, at higher latitudes it frequently enters shallow inshore waters; for example, in Monterey Canyon it can be consistently found at depths of 15–35 m (49–115 ft), and off Moss Landing one individual was captured in water only 4 m (13 ft) deep. This shark inhabits continental and insular shelves and slopes, where it swims close to the bottom. It can also be found inside submarine canyons, close to the walls. It prefers areas with a muddy or sandy substrate. It is tolerant of low dissolved oxygen levels, allowing it to inhabit oceanic basins inaccessible to other sharks.

== Biology and ecology ==
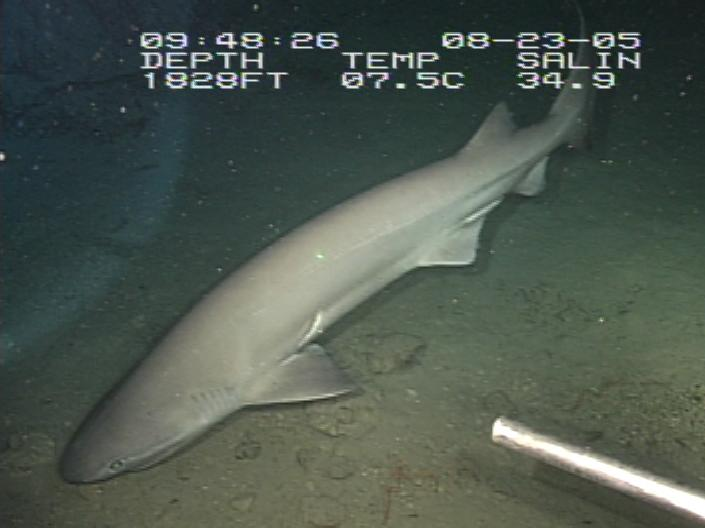
The prickly shark and the bluntnose sixgill shark (pictured) prey on each other's young.

The prickly shark is a slow swimmer and has been observed hovering just above the sea floor. A tracking study in Monterey Canyon found that this species exhibits strong diel migration patterns. The sharks were inactive during the day, resting in discrete refuge areas located near the sea floor in deep, offshore waters. They became active at dusk, swimming towards the coast to the head of the canyon and rising into the water column; this upward movement is likely related to feeding on schooling fishes. Individual sharks seldom strayed from the local area and had very small home ranges, no more than 2.2 km^{2} (0.85 sq mi). The prickly sharks in Monterey Canyon regularly form aggregations that may number over thirty.

The size and structure of the prickly shark's mouth and pharynx suggests that it uses suction to capture prey. This species feeds on a variety of benthic and pelagic bony fishes, including hake, flounders, rockfishes, lingcod, topsmelt, mackerel, and herring, and on cartilaginous fishes, including elephantfishes (Callorhinchus), spiny dogfish (Squalus acanthias), young bluntnose sixgill sharks (Hexanchus griseus), and ghost catshark (Apristurus) egg cases. Octopuses and squid, including the Humboldt squid (Dosidicus gigas) are also consumed. Young prickly sharks may themselves fall prey to the bluntnose sixgill shark, while adults likely face few threats. Reproduction in this species is aplacental viviparous, with the unborn young sustained by yolk. There is only one known record of a pregnant female, which was gestating 114 embryos; this ranks among the largest known litters from any shark. The young are probably under 40 cm (16 in) long at birth. The length at sexual maturity has not been precisely determined but is thought to be around 2.0 m (6.6 ft) for males and 2.5–3.0 m (8.2–9.8 ft) for females.

== Human interactions ==
Interactions with divers show that the prickly shark behaves inoffensively towards humans, either tolerating contact or fleeing when closely approached. It is susceptible to incidental capture by commercial bottom trawls, gillnets, or line gear. It has little commercial value since the meat is soft and poorly regarded.

== Conservation status ==
In June 2018 the New Zealand Department of Conservation classified the prickly shark as "At Risk – Naturally Uncommon" with the qualifiers "Data Poor" and "Secure Overseas" under the New Zealand Threat Classification System. The International Union for Conservation of Nature (IUCN) has assessed the prickly shark as Data Deficient, citing its patchy known distribution and the continuing expansion of deepwater fisheries.
