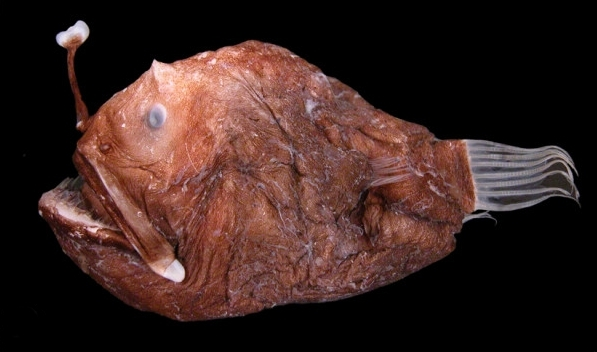

Conservation status
- Least Concern (IUCN 3.1)

Scientific classification
- Kingdom: Animalia
- Phylum: Chordata
- Class: Actinopterygii
- Order: Lophiiformes
- Family: Diceratiidae
- Genus: Diceratias
- Species: D. trilobus

Binomial name
- Diceratias trilobus Balushkin & Fedorov, 1986

= Diceratias trilobus =

Species of fish

Diceratias trilobus is a species of deep sea marine ray-finned fish belonging to the family Diceratiidae, the double anglers. The fish is bathypelagic and has been found as deep as 1,216 metres (3,990 ft). It is endemic to the northwest Pacific Ocean. A distinct characteristic of this species of anglerfish is its short illicium and abnormally large esca (the commonly recognized lure of light).
