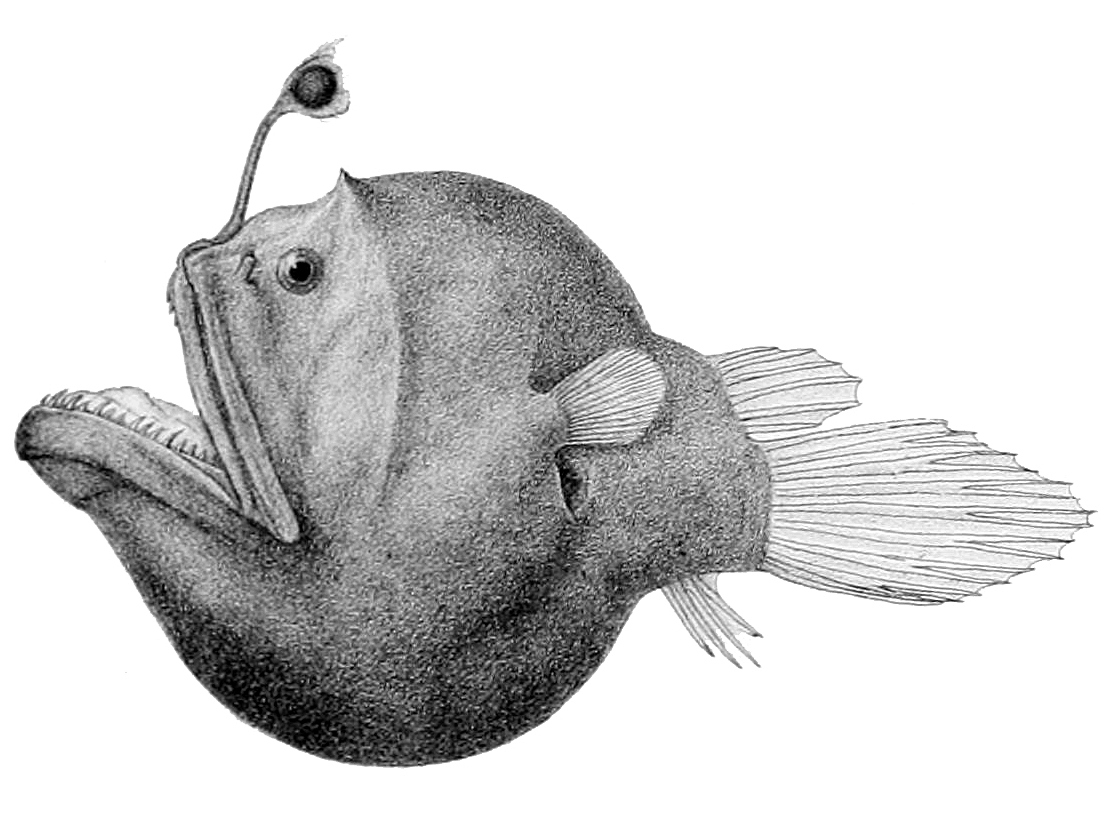
- Diceratias bispinosus

Scientific classification
- Kingdom: Animalia
- Phylum: Chordata
- Class: Actinopterygii
- Division: Teleostei
- Order: Lophiiformes
- Family: Diceratiidae
- Genus: Diceratias; Günther, 1887

Type species
- Diceratias bispinosus Günther, 1887

= Diceratias =

Genus of fishes

Diceratias is a genus of deep sea marine ray-finned fish belonging to the family Diceratiidae, the double anglers. These fishes are found in the Eastern Atlantic and Indo-Pacific regions.

== Taxonomy ==
Diceratias was first proposed as a monospecific genus in 1887 by the German-born British herpetologist and ichthyologist Albert Günther when he described Diceratias bispinosus. When he described D. bispinosus Günther gave the type locality as off Banda Island at a depth of 360 fathoms (2,160 ft; 660 m) on the Challenger expedition of 1872-1876. This genus is one of two genera in the family Diceratiidae which the 5th edition of Fishes of the World classifies within the suborder Ceratioidei within the order Lophiiformes, the anglerfishes.

== Etymology ==
Diceratias prefixes di, meaning "two" onto the genus name Ceratias. This genus was thought to be a subgenus of Ceratias with two cephalic spines instead of one.

== Species ==
Diceratias contains the following species:

- Diceratias bispinosus Günther, 1887 (Two-rod anglerfish)
- Diceratias pileatus Uwate, 1979
- Diceratias trilobus Balushkin & Fedorov, 1986

== Characteristics ==
Direcatias double anglers are sexually dimorphic. The metamorphosed females can be separated from other females in the suborder Ceratioidei by the possession of a second, club-like exposed cephalic spine bearing a bioluminescent organ at its tip. In this genus the spine is on the snout rather than being located at the back of the head as in Bufoceratias, the forward tip of the illicium's pterygiophore is exposed while in Bufoceratias it is hidden and it has a deep trough it can be retracted into. The spine is shorter than in Bufoceratias having a length equivalent to between 27% and 47% of the standard length. They also have a large mouth which reaches back beyond the eye, a well developed spine on the symphysis of the mandible which reaches just past the maxilla, the presence of vomerine teeth, there are large spines in the skin, the dorsal fin has between five and seven rays while the anal fin has four rays and they have a small pelvic bone which is joined to the cleithrum. The second cephalic spine is positioned directly behind the base of the first cephalic spine, or illicium and can be pulled down beneath the skin in individuals with a total length greater than 1.3 cm (0.51 in) leaving a small pore to show its location. The males have spinules in the skin, they have two teeth on the snout and two transverse rows of 4 or 5 teeth on the lower jaw, all separate from each other. The eyes and nostrils of the males are directed laterally. The largest species in the genus is D.pileatus with a maximum published standard length for a metamorphosed female of 23.5 cm (9.3 in).

== Distribution and habitat ==
Diceratias double anglers are found in the Eastern Atlantic Ocean and the Indo-Pacific, they are bathypelagic fishes which are found in tropical and subtropical waters, on or near the continental shelf at depths between 533 and 2,306 m (1,749 and 7,566 ft).
