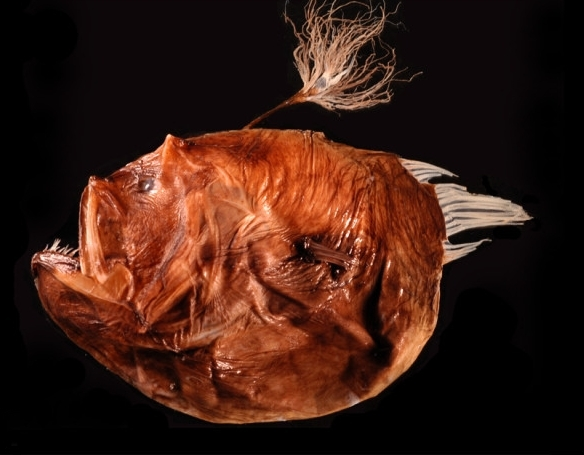

Conservation status
- Least Concern (IUCN 3.1)

Scientific classification
- Kingdom: Animalia
- Phylum: Chordata
- Class: Actinopterygii
- Order: Lophiiformes
- Family: Diceratiidae
- Genus: Bufoceratias
- Species: B. shaoi

Binomial name
- Bufoceratias shaoi Pietsch, Ho & Chen, 2004

= Bufoceratias shaoi =

Species of fish

Bufoceratias shaoi is a species of double angler, a type of anglerfish. The fish is bathypelagic and has been found at depths ranging from 0 to 1,200 metres (0 to 3,937 ft). It has been found in the western Indian Ocean and western Pacific Ocean. It was first described in 2004 by Theodore Pietsch, Ho Hsuan-Ching & Chen Hong-Ming.
