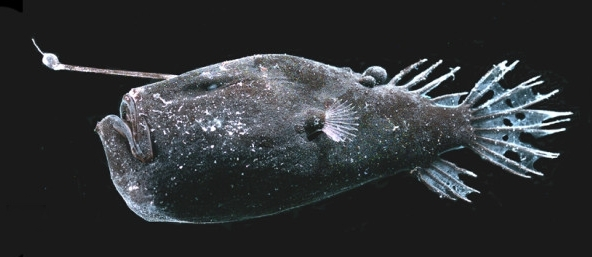
- Female triplewart seadevil (specimen)

Conservation status
- Least Concern (IUCN 3.1)

Scientific classification
- Kingdom: Animalia
- Phylum: Chordata
- Class: Actinopterygii
- Order: Lophiiformes
- Family: Ceratiidae
- Genus: Cryptopsaras; Gill, 1883
- Species: C. couesii

Binomial name
- Cryptopsaras couesii Gill, 1883

Synonyms
- Ceratias couesii (Gill, 1883); Ceratias carunculatus Günther, 1887; Cryptopsaras carunculatus (Günther, 1887); Ceratias mitsukurii Tanaka, 1908; Cryptopsaras pennifer Regan & Trewavas, 1932; Cryptopsaras valdiviae Regan & Trewavas, 1932; Cryptopsaras normani Regan & Trewavas, 1932; Cryptopsaras atlantidis Barbour, 1941

= Triplewart seadevil =

Species of fish

The triplewart seadevil (Cryptopsaras couesii) is a species of marine ray-finned fish belonging to the family Ceratiidae, the warty sea devils, and the order Lophiiformes. This species is the only member of its genus. Like other Ceratioids, this species is notable for its extreme sexual dimorphism.

== Taxonomy ==
The triplewart seadevil was first formally described in 1883 by the American biologist Theodore Gill with its type locality given as off New York in the western North Atlantic at 39°18'30"N, 68°24'00"W, Albatross station 2101, from a depth of 1,686 fathoms (10,116 ft; 3,083 m). When Gill described this species he classified it in the new monospecific genus Cryptopsaras. Cryptopsaras is one of two genera which the 5th edition of Fishes of the World classifies as belonging to the family Ceratiidae in the suborder Ceratioidei of the anglerfish order Lophiiformes.

== Etymology ==
The triplewart seadevil is the only species in the genus Cryptopsaras, this name is a combination of kryptos, which means "hidden" or "secret", with psarus, meaning "fisherman", an allusion to the very small illicium being almost completely concealed within the tissue of the esca. The specific name honors the "eminent" ornithologist Elliott Coues.

== Distribution ==
Triplewart seadevils are ceratioids commonly found worldwide in all major oceans. They are seen in depths ranging from 75 to 4,000 m (250 to 13,120 ft), with the majority of specimens found in the mesopelagic and bathypelagic zones between 500 and 1,250 m (1,640 and 4,100 ft). It is dispersed from the deep ocean to shallower water because its weak swimming power allows it to be carried over long distances by ocean currents.

== Morphology ==
Female triplewart seadevils have a laterally compressed, elongated body with a large head and a mouth that is nearly vertical when closed. It has 2 to 3 rows of irregular depressible teeth, with significantly larger teeth on the lower jaw than the smaller upper jaw. The body is covered by deeply embedded hollow spines. Only the tips show and there are no conical bone plates. The 3 lateral caruncles have club-shaped glands that secrete a slime containing luminous granules. Adult females have jet-black pigmentation while juveniles are dark brown.

The triplewart seadevil uses an illicium, a sort of spine on the snout, to lure prey. This apparatus is primarily composed of a terminating esca or lure supported by an extremely long pterygiophore bone encased in a dermal sheath. Winding muscles control the anterior and posterior movement of the bone, suggesting extension and retraction by rotation. Furthermore the illicium has a wide range of anterior and posterior motion. The terminal esca contains bioluminescent bacterial symbionts, creating a glowing lure for their prey. The oral region (mouth) of this species is noted to have a similar morphology to frogfish (Antennariidae), which may imply adaptations to suction feeding through extreme buccal expansion.

=== Sexual dimorphism ===
The triplewart seadevil displays extreme sexual dimorphism; ranging from 20–44 centimetres (7.9–17.3 in) for females and 1–7.3 centimetres (0.39–2.87 in) for males. Typical of Ceratioids, the dwarfed males parasitize the larger females; their specialized jaw has an anterior pair of denticular teeth that are longer than their posterior pair. Males permanently attach themselves to the females, typically the ventrum but can be almost anywhere on her body, with the specialized denticular apparatus meant for grasping their mate. Once attached, tissue fusion occurs, permanently binding the mouth and one side of the male to the surface of the female. After attachment, the male becomes dependent on the female for blood-circulated nutrients due to the fusion of the circulatory and digestive systems. This case of extreme sexual dimorphism is favored by natural selection due to the random dispersal of individuals. If one of the relatively numerous males is fortunate enough to encounter a female, it attaches for the remainder of its life. This significantly increases the chance of reproduction for the individual and therefore increases its fitness.

== Reproduction ==
Female triplewart seadevil with parasitic male attached (arrow).

Female triplewart seadevils are receptive to parasitic males at a young age. Once past metamorphosis, sexual parasitism may occur at almost any size and is thought to occur at less than 12 months of age. Despite this, the percentage of reproducing individuals is small. Of 600 metamorphosed females studied, only 6.2% were parasitized. Spawning events occur more than once a year, and the Atlantic Ocean contains triplewart seadevil larvae for most of the year, with summer having the greatest occurrences. The seadevil's method of sexual parasitism leads to the female to be akin to a self-fertilizing hermaphrodite. This is due to the nature of tissue fusion between mates and the continuous production of sperm by the male. Unlike all other ceratioids, males do not have large nostrils for tracking species-specific pheromones emitted by the female. Instead, they have large eyes that degenerate upon attachment to the female. Parasitic males are consistently larger-bodied than free-living/pelagic males; the largest known pelagic males reach 14.3 millimetres (0.56 in), while 8 parasitic males attached to a single 316 millimetres (12.4 in) female ranged in size from 35 to 56 millimetres (1.4 to 2.2 in), likely an indicator of the order of their attachment (biggest males attaching earliest). Parasitic males were found to be more somatically developed than pelagics, and unlike previously thought, they do not "degenerate"; they retain the rays on all of their fins. When surgically removed from a female, parasitic males are still able to swim to some extent.
