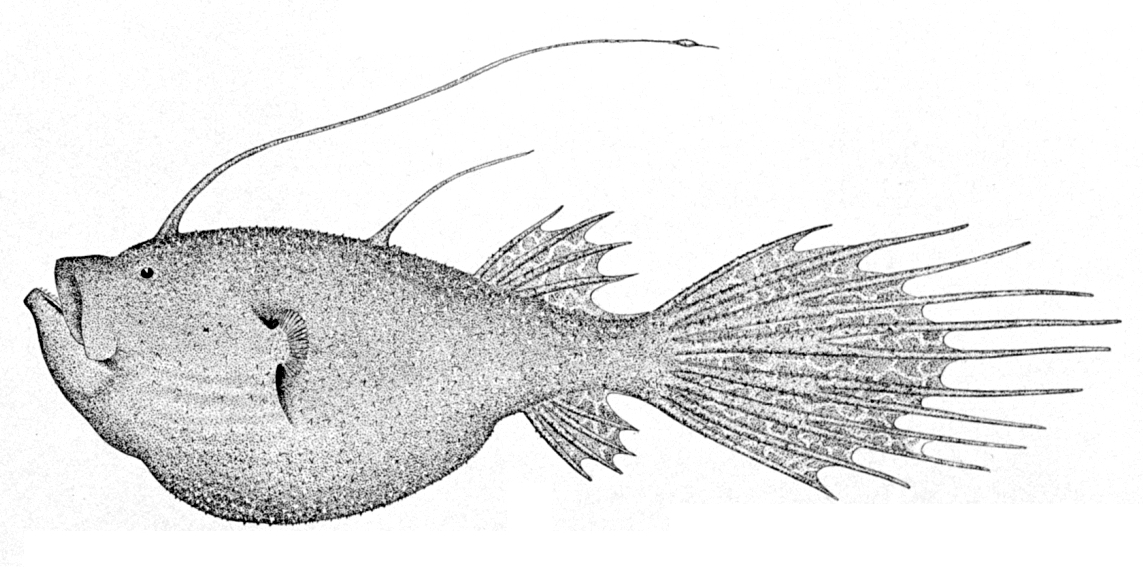
- Kroyer's Deep-sea Angler Fish (C. holboelli)
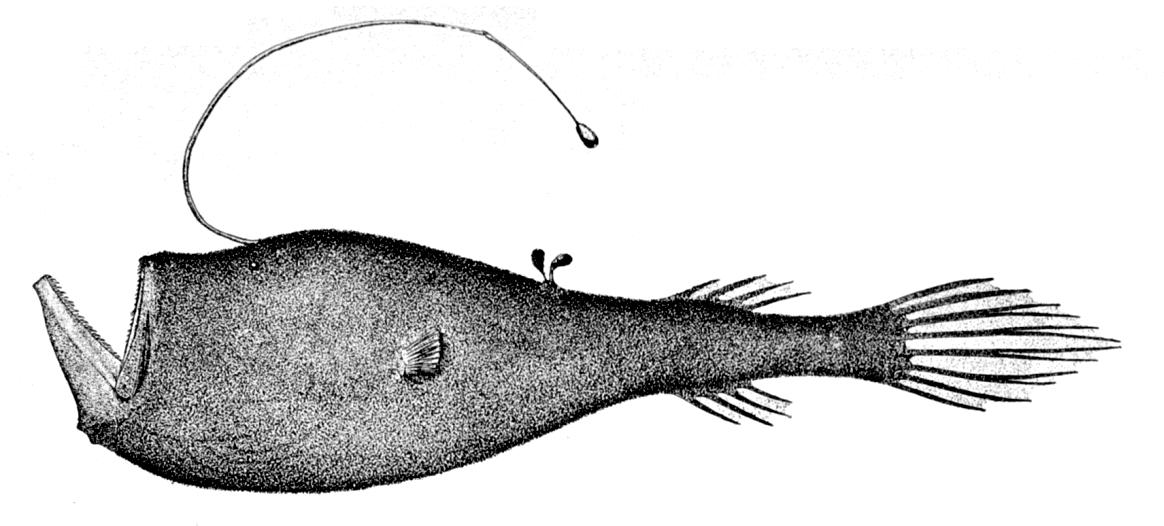
- Stargazing Seadevil (C. uranoscopus)

Scientific classification
- Kingdom: Animalia
- Phylum: Chordata
- Class: Actinopterygii
- Order: Lophiiformes
- Family: Ceratiidae
- Genus: Ceratias; Krøyer, 1845

Type species
- Ceratias holboelli Krøyer, 1845

Synonyms
- Mancalias Gill, 1878; Miopsaras Gilbert, 1905; Parrichthys Barbour, 1942; Reganichthys Bigelow & Barbour, 1944; Reganula Bigelow & Barbour, 1944; Typlopsaras Gill, 1883; Miopsaras myops Gilbert, 1905 (nomen dubium); Typhloceratias firthi Barbour, 1942b(nomen dubium); Parrichthys merrimani Barbour, 1942b (nomen dubium)

= Ceratias =

Genus of fishes

Ceratias is a genus of marine ray-finned fish sometimes referred to as the doublewart- or giant seadevils, belonging to the family Ceratiidae, the warty sea devils. The fishes in this genus are found throughout the world's oceans.

== Taxonomy ==
Ceratias was first proposed as a monospecific genus in 1845 by the Danish zoologist Henrik Nikolai Krøyer when he described Ceratias holboelli. The type locality of C. holboelli was given as Southern Greenland. The 5th edition of Fishes of the World classifies this genus in the family Ceratiidae within the suborder Ceratioidei of the anglerfish order Lophiiformes. Within the Ceratioidei this family is a sister taxon to the Centrophrynidae.

== Etymology ==
Ceratias means "horn bearer", an allusion to the esca sticking up from the snout.

== Species ==
There are currently three recognized species in this genus:

- Ceratias holboelli Krøyer, 1845 (Krøyer's deep sea angler fish)
- Ceratias tentaculatus Norman, 1930 (southern seadevil)
- Ceratias uranoscopus J. Murray, 1877 (stargazing seadevil)

== Characteristics ==
Ceratias warty seadevils have metamorphosed females that are distinguished from those of the triplewart seadevil, the only member of the other Ceratiid genus Cryptopsaras, in having a long illicium. The illicium is twice as long as the bulb of the esca. They also have two modified first dorsal fin rays, or caruncles on the midline of the back immediately in front of the main fin. There is also no anterior spine in the suboperculum. In the males of this genus the upper and lower pairs of denticular teeth are almost the same size. The larvae, males and the juvenile females do not have any pigment in the subdermal layer. The largest species in the genus is Krøyer's deep sea angler fish which has a maximum published total length of 120 cm (47 in).

== Distribution and habitat ==
Ceratias wart sea devils are found throughout the world's oceans at depths from the surface to 4,400 m (14,400 ft). Only adults appear in colder polar waters.
