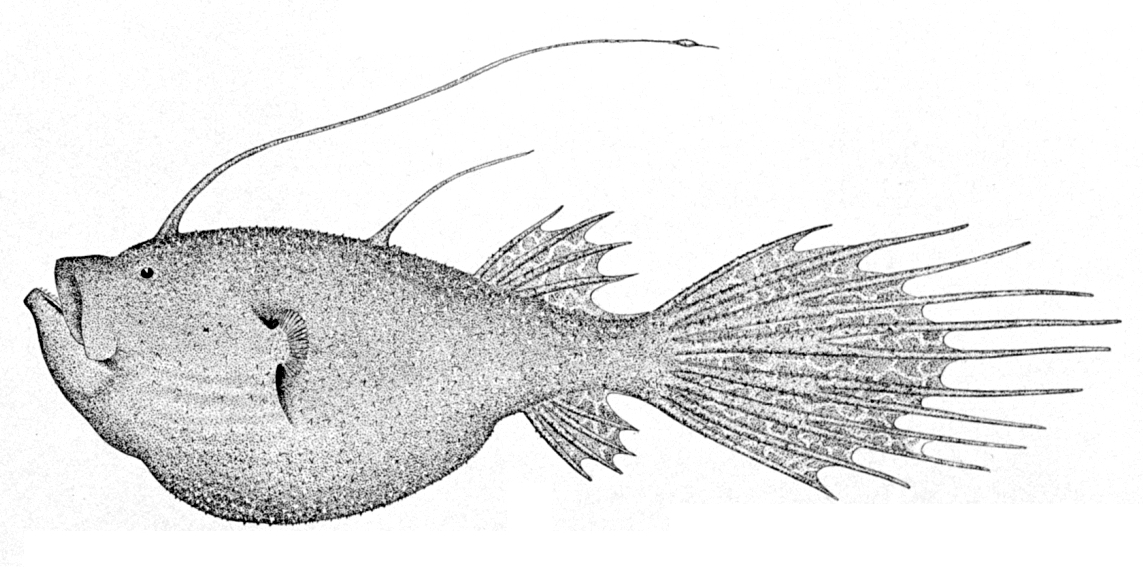
- Krøyer's deep sea angler fish, Ceratias holboelli

Scientific classification
- Kingdom: Animalia
- Phylum: Chordata
- Class: Actinopterygii
- Division: Teleostei
- Order: Lophiiformes
- Suborder: Ceratioidei
- Family: Ceratiidae; T. N. Gill, 1861

Genera
- see text

= Ceratiidae =

Sea devils

Family of fishes

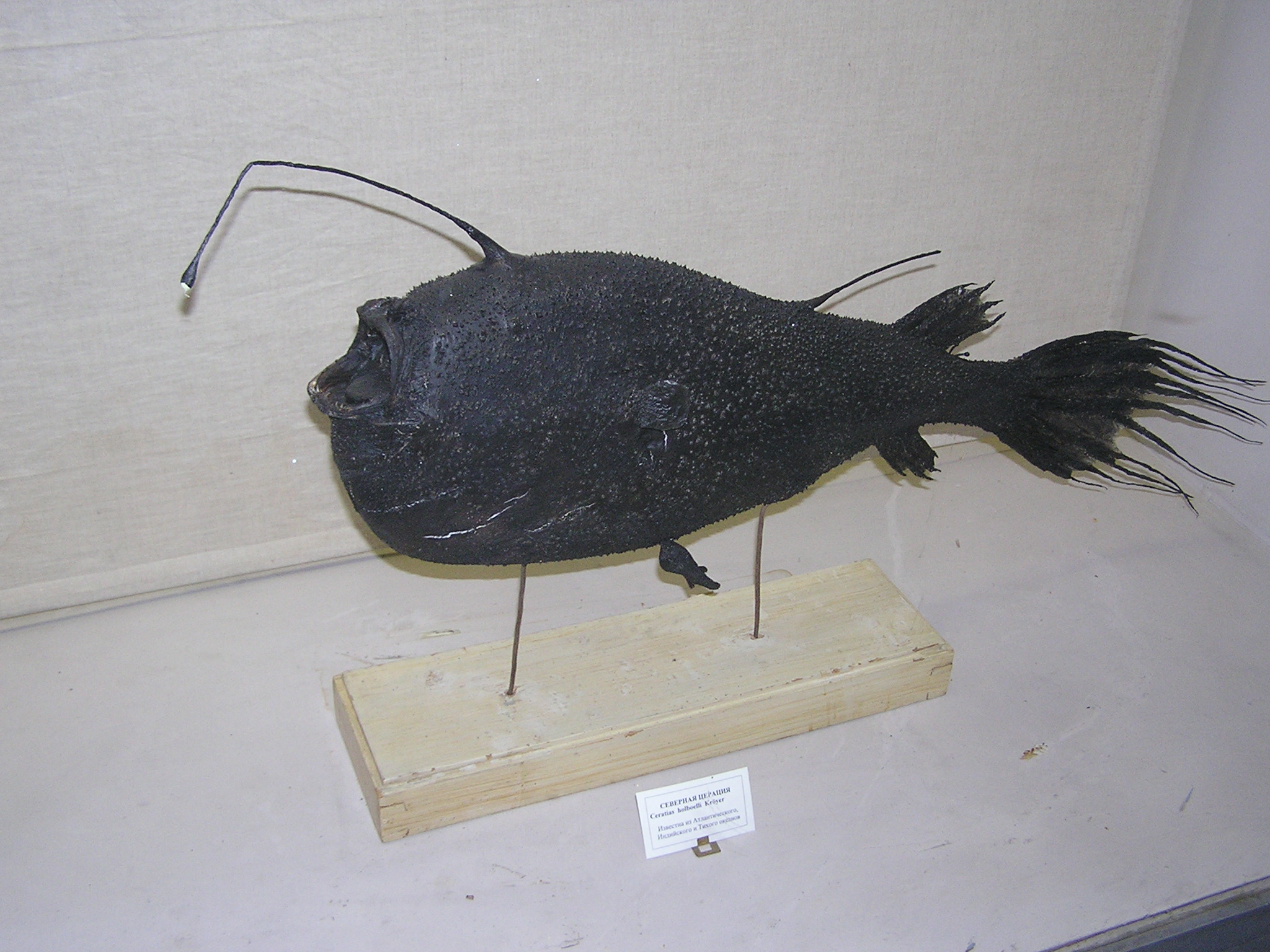
Female with a parasitic male, preparation at the Saint Petersburg Zoology Museum

Ceratiidae, the warty seadevils or caruncled seadevils, are a family of marine ray-finned fishes belonging to the suborder Ceratioidei, the deep-sea anglerfishes, in the anglerfish order Lophiiformes. The warty sea devils are sexually dimorphic with the small males being obligate sexual parasites of the much larger females. The fishes in this family are widely distributed from polar to tropical seas around the world.

== Etymology ==
Ceratiidae takes its name from the genus Ceratias, its type genus, meaning "horn bearer", an allusion to the esca sticking up from the snout.

== Taxonomy ==
Ceratiidae was first proposed as a subfamily of Lophiidae in 1861 by the American biologist Theodore Gill, with Ceratias as its only genus. Ceratias had been proposed as a monospecific genus in 1845 by the Danish zoologist Henrik Nikolai Krøyer when he described Ceratias holboelli from the waters off Greenland. The 5th edition of Fishes of the World classifies this family in the suborder Ceratioidei of the anglerfish order Lophiiformes. Within the Ceratioidei this family is a sister taxon to the Centrophrynidae.

== Genera and species ==
The Ceratiidae contains the following two genera with a total of four species:

- Ceratias Krøyer, 1845
  - Ceratias holboelli Krøyer 1845 (Krøyer's deep sea angler fish)
  - Ceratias tentaculatus Norman, 1930 (southern seadevil)
  - Ceratias uranoscopus J. Murray, 1877 (stargazing seadevil)
- Cryptopsaras Gill, 1883
  - Cryptopsaras couesii Gill, 1883 (Triplewart seadevil)

== Characteristics ==
Ceratiidae are characterised by having elongated, laterally compressed and relatively large bodies, compared to other deep-sea anglerfishes. The mouth may be upwardly directed and may be vertical or set at a very oblique angle. The posterior of the very long pterygiophore of the illicium sticks out from the midline of the body and is retractable within a furrow which runs the length of the upper part of the head. The rear end of this furrow forms a cylindrical tube in the skin which projects in front of the modified first dorsal fin rays, or caruncles. The metamorphosed females have no spines on the sphenotic, quadrate, articular, angular and preopercular bones. The illicium emerges between the frontal bones on the snout and the skin has a dense covering of spinules. There are two or three caruncles, the wart-like glands formed from the front dorsal fin rays, being the namesake feature of the warty sea devils. They typically have four, sometimes five, soft rays in both the dorsal and anal fins. While they are free-swimming the males have large bowl-like eyes contrasting with very small olfactory organs. There are two large denticular teeth, merged at their bases, as the tip of the snout and in contact with the illicium's pterygiophore. On the tip of the lower jaw there are two more pairs of denticular teeth. When they are free-swimming the males have naked, unpigmented skin but when they join with a female to become sexually parasitic they develop dark pigmentation and a covering of spinules. The larvae have a convex back, vertical mouth and moderately inflated skin, males and females show sexual dimorphism at all stages of development with the basic illicium and caruncles along the midline of the back and small pectoral fins. The second dorsal spine in larval and juvenile females has a bioluminescent gland at its tip that becomes reduced and hidden beneath the skin immediately to the rear of the base of the illicium in adults. The largest species in the family is Krøyer's deep sea angler fish (C. holboelli), with a standard length of no less than 85.5 cm (33.7 in), the free-swimming males have a standard length no greater than 0.2 cm (0.079 in) and the parasitic males can grow up to 14 cm (5.5 in). These fishes also have a long illicium with a bioluminescent lure and two or three bioluminescent caruncles.

== Distribution and habitat ==
Ceratiidae are found throughout the world in the Atlantic, Pacific and Indian Oceans, from subarctic waters through the temperate and tropical waters to the subantarctic oceans. They are found at depths between 150 and 2,000 m (490 and 6,560 ft).

== Biology ==
Ceratiidae are solitary, deep water bathypelagic and mesopelagic anglerfishes. They have pelagic eggs and larvae. Females lure prey using the illicium and esca. The males use their highly developed eyes to actively search for females, whose caruncles are bioluminescent, eventually attaching themselves to using the denticular teeth on the tips of the jaws and becoming sexual parasites, fusing their tissue and blood vessels.
