= Viktor Pietschmann =

Austrian zoologist

Viktor Pietschmann

Viktor Pietschmann (27 October 1881 – 11 November 1956) was an Austrian ichthyologist at the Vienna Museum of Natural History. He was the curator of the fish collection from 1919 to 1946 and made collecting trips to the Barents Sea, Greenland, Mesopotamia, Armenia, Hawaii, Romania, and Poland. Pietschmann described many new fish, including several species of shark, and had more than 50 publications over his career. He served in the Austrian army in World War I, during which he was stationed in the Ottoman Empire. While there, Pietschmann witnessed the Armenian genocide and took many photographs of the deportees. He joined the National Socialist German Workers' Party (NSDAP) in 1932 and remained a member until the end of World War II.

His zoological author abbreviation is Pietschmann.

== Early life ==
Viktor Pietschmann was born in Vienna, Austria to parents Karl Pietschmann and Ida in 1881. He graduated in 1899 from the Piaristengymnasium in Vienna and furthered his studies at the University of Vienna in zoology.

== Career prior to World War I ==
In 1905, Pietschmann befriended zoologist Franz Steindachner and became his assistant in the fish collection of the Museum of Natural History in Vienna. That same year he studied deep-sea fish in the Barents Sea, and in 1909 he participated in an expedition to Greenland. He was part of an expedition to Mesopotamia in 1910 where he collected specimens. Pietschmann then headed an expedition to Armenia in 1914. After a brief visit in Austria, he returned to the Ottoman Empire to help the war effort.

== World War I ==
During World War I, Pietschmann served in the Ottoman Empire from late 1914 to the end of the war. He served the Turkish Army as an officer, providing ski training for a platoon of Turkish and Kurdish soldiers. He then served with the German and Austrian forces and was tasked to make maps of southwest Asia.

=== Witness to the Armenian genocide ===
While he was in Erzurum, Pietschmann was witness to the Armenian genocide carried out by the local government authorities. When the Germans and Austrians withdrew their forces from the front, Pietschmann was forced to leave Erzurum on 18 June 1915 by the German consul of Erzurum, Max Erwin von Scheubner-Richter. Pietschmann was accompanied by Carl Schlimme, an assistant of Scheubner-Richter. They were told by the consul to take an Armenian family along and help them find refuge. In Bayburt, they were stopped by Turkish soldiers and ordered to surrender the Armenian family. When they refused, the caravan drivers were apprehended. Consequently, Pietschmann and Schlimme were forced to drive the caravans themselves. When Turkish soldiers demanded the Armenian family once more, Pietschmann and Schlimme confronted them with guns and thus secured a passage for themselves out of Bayburt, headed towards Erzincan. Upon arrival in Erzincan, the Armenian family was apprehended and stationed in a local prison under the pretext of concealing weapons in their belongings. According to Schlimme, this was a false accusation since he had searched their belongings for any sort of weapon himself.

During this time, Pietschmann witnessed mass deportations and acts of violence committed against the Armenian deportees. In his accounts, he indicates that the first wave of deportees were the more prominent members of the local Armenian community. He describes how Armenian deportees were sent further west where they were ultimately killed by being hurled into gorges. This was confirmed by Schlimme's earlier report, in which he described those sent to the Kemah gorge as mostly hungry and half-naked women and children. Schlimme reported that when they gave the deportees some bread, the latter were immediately beaten by the gendarmes for having accepted it. Pietschmann lamented thus over the Armenian children on their way to their destination:

Poor little worms! You have only a few days left, then you will be surrounded by the wet grave of the Kemach gorge. It will end all your fairy-tales, all the beliefs in a beautiful, warm, green, friendly and cheerful world.

Pietschmann and the others reached the port city of Trabzon, where they departed for Constantinople.

=== Photographs and publications recording the Armenian genocide ===
Throughout his journey out of Erzurum, Pietschmann took numerous photographs of the deportees along their route. The photos were held in the archives of the Deutsche Bank in Vienna until they were discovered in 2007 by Artem Ohandjanyan, an ethnic Armenian resident of Austria. Ohandjanyan donated them to the Armenian Genocide Museum-Institute in Yerevan, Armenia. The Museum-Institute subsequently incorporated the photos into an exhibition that was showcased worldwide.

Pietschmann published two books about his experiences during the genocide. In his first book, published in 1927 entitled Unter Eis und Palmen (Under Ice and Palms), Pietschmann recalls his travels and writes extensively about the violence suffered by the Armenian deportees. Pietschmann's second publication, entitled Durch kurdische Berge und armenische Städte (Through Kurdish Mountains and Armenian Cities) was published in 1940. It is essentially the diary of his time in the region during that period and is replete with numerous illustrations and photographs.

Photographs of the deportees by Pietschmann

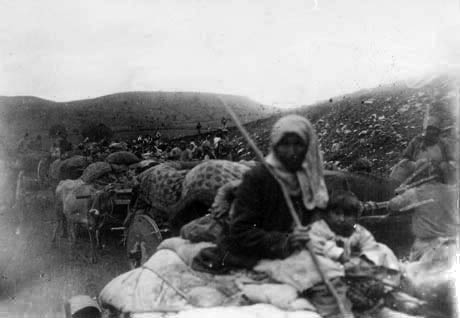

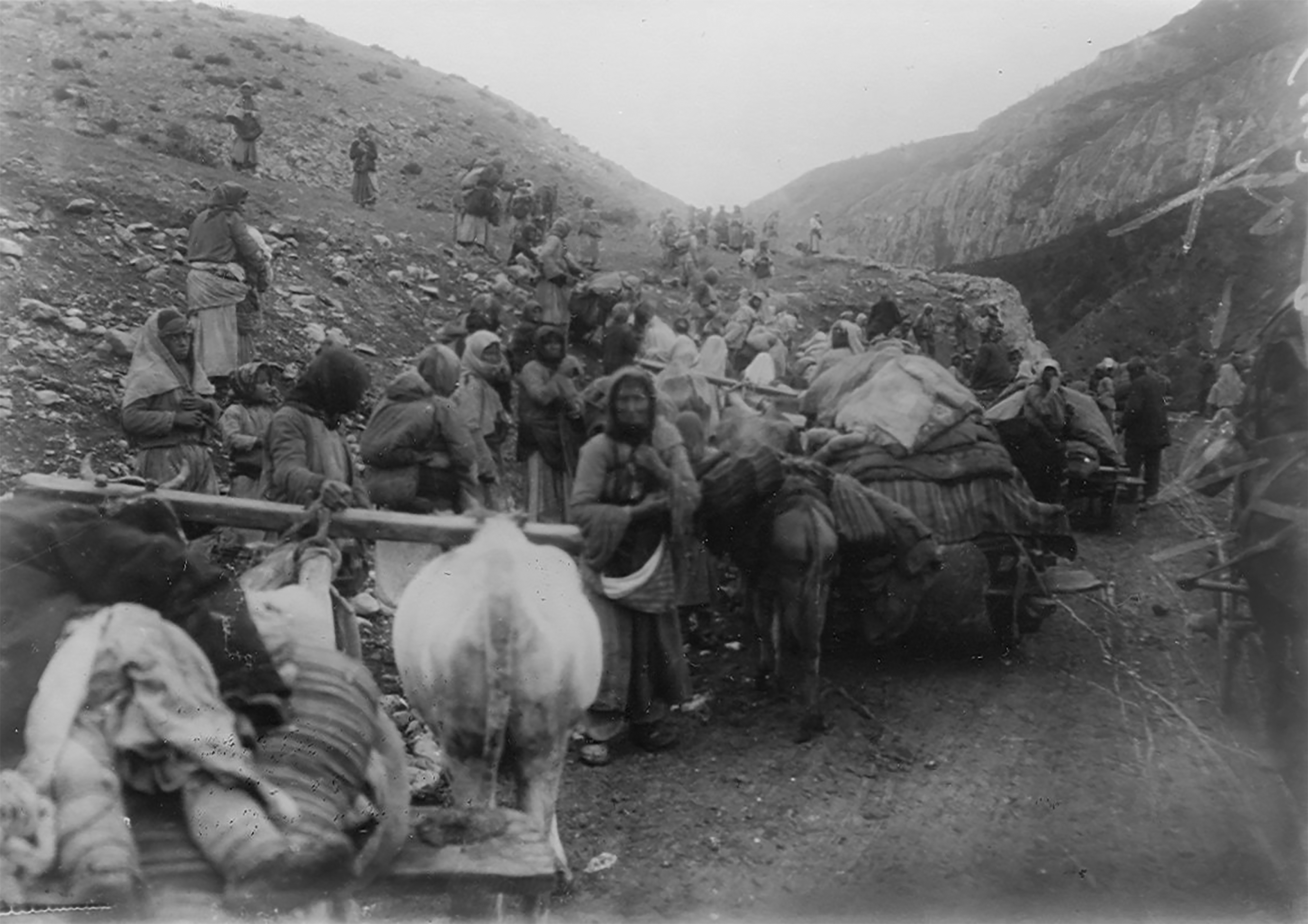

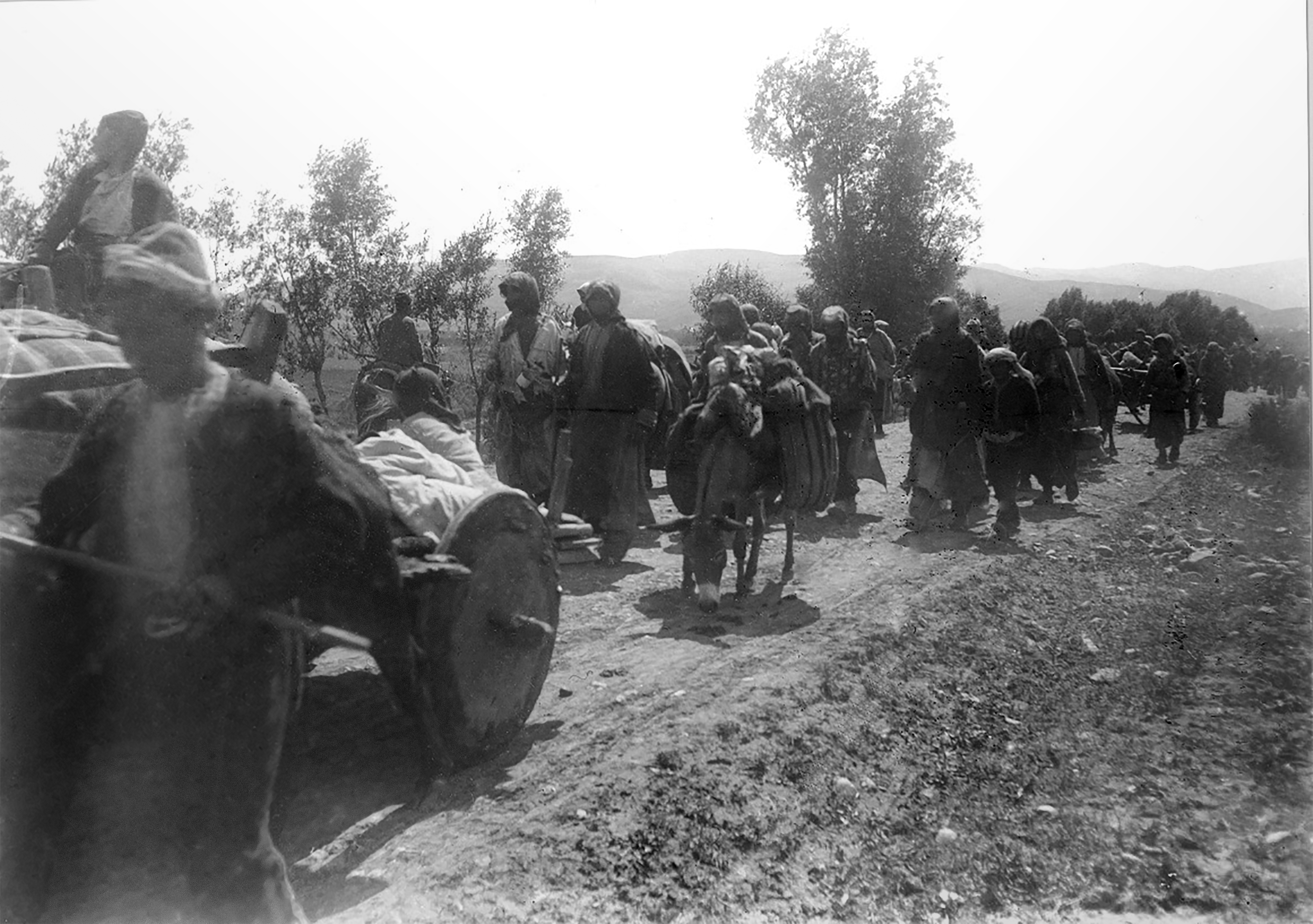

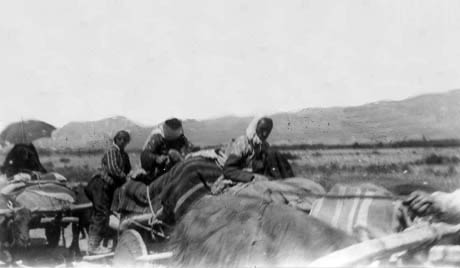

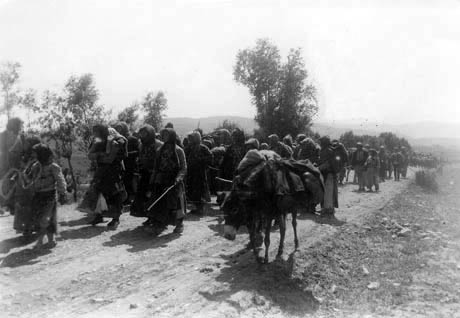

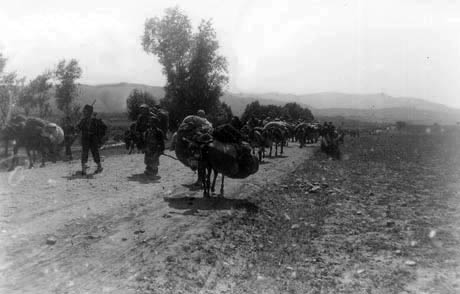

== Return to Austria ==
After the death of Franz Steindarcher on 10 December 1919, Pietschmann became the curator of the fish collection at the Museum of Natural History in Vienna, a position he held until 1946. During his career, Pietschmann went on a number of trips around the world, including to Hawaii (1927), Anatolia (1931), Poland, and Romania.

He is accredited with discovering the prickly shark. He described the shark as a new species in two separate publications: a brief German account in a 1928 volume of Anzeiger der Akademie der Wissenschaften in Wien and a more detailed English account in a 1930 volume of Bernice P. Bishop Museum Bulletin. Pietschmann named the shark in honor of C. Montague Cooke Jr., a conchologist at the Bishop Museum.

In 1930, Pietschmann married Margarete August Keldorfer. They had four children.

Viktor Pietschmann joined the Nazi Party in 1932, though little is known about his activities as a member.

== Later life ==
Due to his previous affiliation with the Nazi Party, Pietschmann was forced to retire in 1946. He died on 24 November 1956.

== Publications ==
Some of his publications include:

- Expedition nach Mesopotamien im Jahre 1910. 1911.
- Bandfische und "Grosse Seeschlange". 1922.
- Eis und Palmen – Reiseskizzen aus Nord und Süd. Wilhelm Braumüller Verlag, Wien 1927.
- Durch kurdische Berge und armenische Städte. Adolf Luser Verlag, Wien 1940.
- Führer durch die Sonderschau "Ostmarkdeutsche als Forscher und Sammler in unseren Kolonien": Ein Anteil der Ostmark an der Erforschung und Erschließung der deutschen Kolonialgebiete. Waldheim-Eberle, Wien 1940.
- See also ZOBODAT list of his publications

== See also ==
- Witnesses and testimonies of the Armenian genocide
- Taxa named by Viktor Pietschmann
