= Sahel Alma (fossil site) =

Paleontological site in Lebanon

- Stratigraphic range: Late Santonian; ~85–84 Ma
- Type: Lagerstätte
- Unit of: Chekka Formation

Lithology
- Primary: Chalk, limestone

Location
- Coordinates: 34.0°N 35.7°E
- Approximate paleocoordinates: 12.9°N 30.4°E
- Region: Keserwan-Jbeil Governorate
- Country: Lebanon

Type section
- Named for: Sahel Alma
- Sahel Alma (fossil site) (Lebanon)

Sahel Alma or Sahel Aalma is a Late Cretaceous paleontological site and Konservat-Lagerstätte in Keserwan-Jbeil, Lebanon. Located near the town of the same name, it documents well-preserved deepwater marine fossils dating to the late Santonian stage of the Cretaceous. It is often associated with the slightly older, similarly famous Sannine Formation sites (Haqel, Hadjula, and Nammoura), with these four sites being together referred to as the "Fish Beds" of Lebanon.

It is one of the few fossiliferous units of the Chekka Formation, a wider geological formation in Lebanon deposited from the Late Cretaceous to the early Paleogene. The site is no longer accessible for scientific research as buildings were constructed over it.

== Description ==
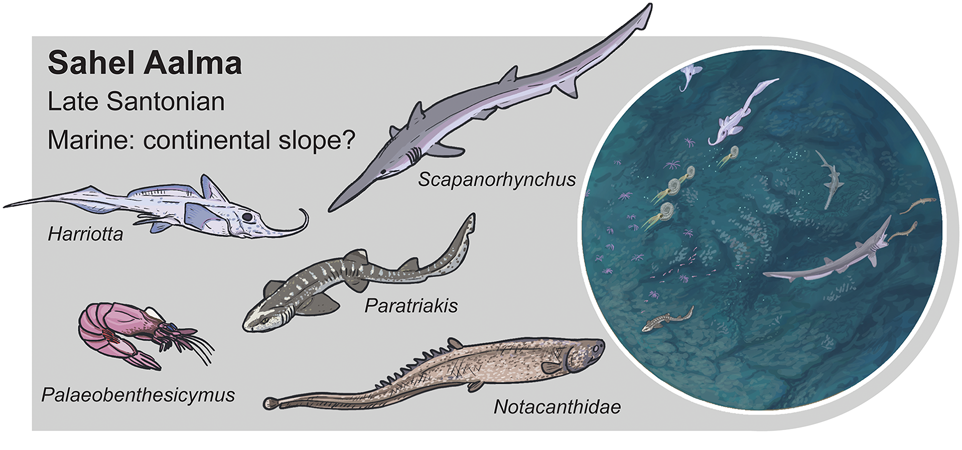
Fauna and depositional environment of the Sahel Alma locality

Much like the fossil sites of the older Sannine Formation, Sahel Alma contains exquisitely preserved marine fossils from the Tethys Ocean, deposited off the northern coast of the Afro-Arabian continent. However, unlike the Sannine Formation sites, which were deposited in relatively shallow waters near the shore on the inner continental shelf, Sahel Alma was deposited in a deepwater habitat off the continental slope, at depths estimated to be greater than 150 metres (490 ft), likely at the transition between the sublittoral and bathyal zones in dysphotic or aphotic conditions. This has caused it to preserve a distinct fauna from the Sannine Formation, with a significant number of deepwater arthropods and chondrichthyans.

As with the sites of the Sannine Formation, the fossils of Sahel Alma are very well-preserved, and include the soft body parts of cartilaginous fish and cephalopods. Palaeoctopus, the first fossil octopus discovered with preserved soft tissues, was discovered from Sahel Alma.

== History ==
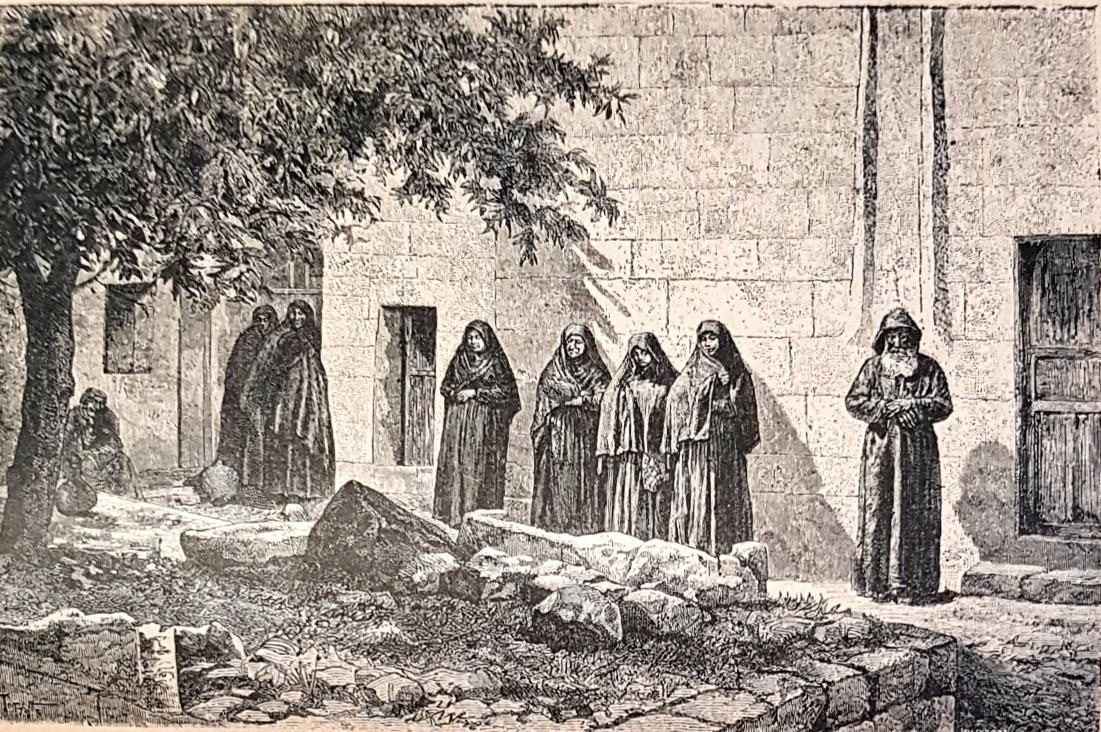
The Sahel Alma monastery, built with bricks from the site

Sahel Alma is one of the oldest-known fossil sites in Lebanon, second only to the Haqel site of the Sannine Formation. It has been known of since the Seventh Crusade in the 13th century, when bricks quarried out of it were used to build the eponymous Maronite monastery at Sahel Alma. A fossil fish presented to King Louis IX around this time may have been from the site. The site was also likely documented by C. F. Volney during the early 1780s. British adventurer Lady Hester Stanhope settled near Sahel Alma in the early 19th century, and helped to collect and circulate fossils from the site and Haqel. Paul-Émile Botta was also another prolific early researcher of the site.

The site is no longer accessible for scientific research as buildings were constructed over it, due to the purchase of the site by a private company, which restored the Sahel Alma monastery as a hotel.

== Paleobiota ==
=== Vertebrates ===
==== Cartilaginous fish ====
Chondrichthyans reported from Sahel Alma
Genus	Species	Notes	Images
Acanthoscyllium	A. sahelalmae	A bamboo shark.	
Almascyllium	A. cheikheliasi	A bamboo shark.	
Anomotodon	A. plicatus	A goblin shark.	
Britobatos	B. primarmata	A potential relative of the thornback rays.	
Centrophoroides	C. latidens	A dogfish shark.	
Centrosqualus	C. primaevus	A dogfish shark.	
Cretascymnus	C. adonis	A sleeper shark.	
Harriotta	H. lehmani	A long-nosed chimaera.	
Hexanchus	H. gracilis	A sixgill shark.	
Paratriakis	P. curtirostris	A houndshark.	
Propristiophorus	P. tumidens	A sawshark	
Pteroscyllium	P. dubertreti	A catshark	
Pteroscyllium	P. signeuxi	A catshark	
'Raja'	'R.' davisi	A ray, either a guitarfish or a skate.	
"Rhinobatos" (gen. nov. 2)	'R.' tenuirostris	A potential relative of the wedgefishes. Likely its own genus.	
"Rhinobatos" (gen. nov. 4)	'R.' intermedius	A guitarfish-like ray. Likely its own genus, and its status as a guitarfish is disputed.	
"Rhinobatos" (gen. nov. 4)	'R.' latus	A guitarfish-like ray. Likely its own genus, and its status as a guitarfish is disputed.	
Scapanorhynchus	S. lewisii	A goblin shark.	
Sclerorhynchus	S. atavus	A sawskate.	
Scyliorhinus	S. elongatus	A catshark	

==== Ray-finned fishes ====
Actinopterygians reported from Sahel Alma
Genus	Species	Notes	Images
Acrogaster	A. daviesi	A trachichthyiform.	
Acrogaster	A. heckeli	A trachichthyiform.	
Alloberyx	A. syriacus	A holocentriform.	
Alloberyx	A. robustus	A holocentriform.	
Benthesikyme	B. gracilis	A dercetid aulopiform.	
Charitosomus	C. lineolatus	A gonorynchid.	
Charitosomus	C. major	A gonorynchid.	
Cheirothrix	C. lewisii	A flying fish-like eurypterygian, possibly an aulopiform.	
Cheirothrix	C. libanicus	A flying fish-like eurypterygian, possibly an aulopiform.	
Ctenocephalichthys	C. brevispinus	A holocentriform.	
Ctenocephalichthys	C. lorteti	A holocentriform.	
Davichthys	D. dubius	An elopid.	
Dercetis	D. triqueter	A dercetid aulopiform.	
Dinopteryx	D. spinosus	A dinopterygid beardfish.	
Diplomystus	D. dubertreti	An armigatid clupeomorph.	
Enchelurus	E. syriacus	An elopomorph sister to eels and notacanthiforms.	
Enchodus	E. major	An enchodontid aulopiform.	
Enchodus	E. longidens	An enchodontid aulopiform.	
Gnathoberyx	G. stigmosus	A trachichthyiform.	
Histiothrissa	H. crassapinna	A clupeiform.	
Hoplopteryx	H. spinulosus	A trachichthyiform.	
Hoplopteryx	H. syriacus	A trachichthyiform.	
Ichthyotringa	I. ferox	An ichthyotringid aulopiform.	
Ichthyotringa	I. furcata	An ichthyotringid aulopiform.	
Ichthyotringa	I. damoni	An ichthyotringid aulopiform.	
Istieus	I. lebanonensis	A bonefish.	
Omosoma	O. intermedium	A polymixiid beardfish.	
Omosoma	O. pulchellum	A polymixiid beardfish.	
Omosoma	O. sahelalmae	A polymixiid beardfish.	
Opistopteryx	O. curtus	A presumed elopiform.	
Opistopteryx	O. gracilis	A presumed elopiform.	
Osmeroides	O. attenuatus	A stem-bonefish.	
Osmeroides	O. gracilis	A stem-bonefish.	
Osmeroides	O. sardinioides	A stem-bonefish.	
Pantopholis	P. dorsalis	An enchodontid aulopiform.	
Parospinus	P. cupulus	A holocentriform.	
Pronotacanthus	P. sahelalmae	A protostomiid fish (previously considered a spiny eel)	
Pycnosterinx	P. discoides	A polymixiid beardfish.	
Pycnosterinx	P. dubius	A polymixiid beardfish.	
Pycnosterinx	P. gracilis	A polymixiid beardfish.	
Pycnosterinx	P. russeggeri	A polymixiid beardfish.	
Sardinioides (=Leptosomus)	S. macrurus	A sardinioidid myctophiform.	
Sardinioides (=Leptosomus)	S. megapterus	A sardinioidid myctophiform.	
Sardinioides (=Leptosomus)	S. pusillus	A sardinioidid myctophiform.	
Spaniodon	S. elongatus	A euteleost, possibly an osmeriform.	
Spaniodon	S. latus	A euteleost, possibly an osmeriform.	
Thrissopteroides	T. tenuiceps	An indeterminate teleost, possibly related to Spaniodon.	
Urenchelys	U. avus	An eel.	

=== Invertebrates ===
==== Arthropods ====
Arthropods reported from Sahel Alma
Genus	Species	Notes	Images
Carpopenaeus	C. garassinoi	A carpopenaeid prawn.	
Cirolana	C. cottreaui	A cirolanid isopod.	
Cirolana	C. garassinoi	A cirolanid isopod.	
Cretasergestes	C. sahelalmaensis	A sergestid prawn.	
Hamaticaris	H. damesi	A protozoeid thylacocephalan.	
Keelicaris	K. deborae	A protozoeid thylacocephalan.	
Loriculina	L. noetlingi	A stramentid barnacle.	
Palaeobenthesicymus	P. libanensis	A benthesicymid shrimp.	
Palaeobenthonectes	P. arambourgi	A benthesicymid shrimp.	
Palaeognathophausia	P. libanotica	A gnathophausiid crustacean.	
Protozoea	P. hilgendorfi	A protozoeid thylacocephalan.	
Pseuderichtus	P. cretaceus	A protozoeid thylacocephalan.	
Pseudodrobna	P. natator	A penaeid prawn.	
Pseudoranina	P. guinotae	A raninid crab.	
Thylacocephalus	T. cymolopos	A microcaridid thylacocephalan.	

==== Molluscs ====
Molluscs reported from Sahel Alma
Genus	Species	Notes	Images
?Boreopeltis	B. smithi	A plesioteuthid coleoid, known from a lost specimen.	
Dorateuthis	D. syriaca	A plesioteuthid coleoid.	
?Glyphiteuthis	G. libanotica	A trachyteuthid coleoid.	
Muniericeras	M. blanfordianum	A muniericeratid ammonoid.	
Palaeoctopus	P. newboldi	An octopus.	
Syrionautilus	S. libanoticus	A cymatoceratid nautiloid.	
Texanites	T. texanus	A collignoniceratid ammonoid.	
