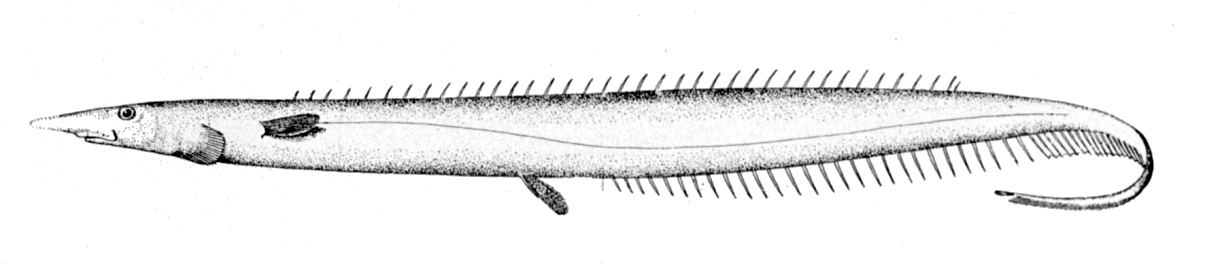
- Smallmouth spiny eel (P. rissoanus)

Scientific classification
- Kingdom: Animalia
- Phylum: Chordata
- Class: Actinopterygii
- Order: Notacanthiformes
- Family: Notacanthidae
- Genus: Polyacanthonotus; Bleeker, 1874

Type species
- Notacanthus rissoanus De Filippi & Vérany, 1857

Synonyms
- Gnathonotacanthus Fowler, 1934; Macdonaldia Goode & Bean, 1895; Paradoxichthys Giglioli, 1882; Zanotacanthus Gill, 1876

= Polyacanthonotus =

Genus of ray-finned fishes

Polyacanthonotus is a genus of spiny eels, with these currently recognized species:

- Polyacanthonotus africanus (Gilchrist & von Bonde, 1924)
- Polyacanthonotus challengeri (Vaillant, 1888) (longnose tapirfish)
- Polyacanthonotus merretti Sulak, R. E. Crabtree & Hureau, 1984 (Bahamas spiny eel)
- Polyacanthonotus rissoanus (De Filippi & Vérany, 1857) (smallmouth spiny eel)
