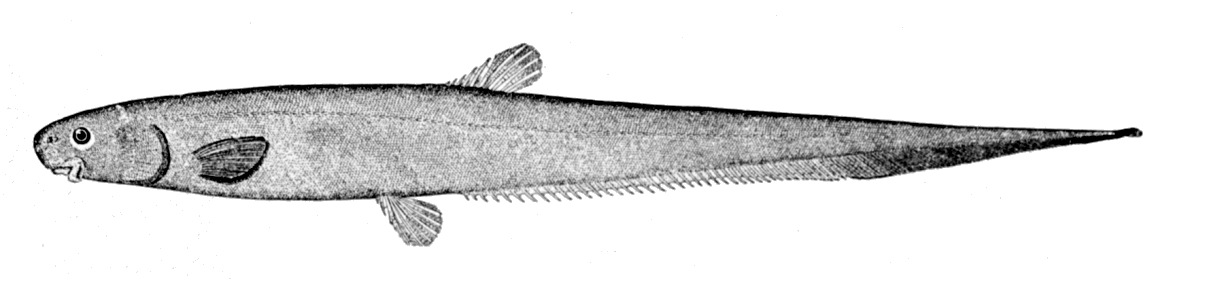

Scientific classification
- Kingdom: Animalia
- Phylum: Chordata
- Class: Actinopterygii
- Order: Notacanthiformes
- Family: Notacanthidae
- Genus: Lipogenys; Goode & T. H. Bean, 1895
- Species: L. gillii

Binomial name
- Lipogenys gillii Goode & T. H. Bean, 1895

Synonyms
- Lipogenys plaxae Sheiko 1988

= Lipogenys =

Species of fish

Lipogenys gillii, the blackfin tapirfish, is a species of spiny eel in the family Notacanthidae, the only member of its genus. It is a benthic deep-sea fish occurring along the eastern coast of North America and in the southwestern Pacific near Australia at depths from 400 to 2,000 m.
