= Pronotacanthus =

Pronotacanthus Temporal range: Santonian

Scientific classification
- Kingdom: Animalia
- Phylum: Chordata
- Class: Actinopterygii
- Division: Teleostei
- Order: Notacanthiformes
- Family: Notacanthidae
- Genus: †Pronotacanthus; Woodward, 1900
- Species: †P. sahelalmae

Binomial name
- †Pronotacanthus sahelalmae (Davis 1887) Woodward, 1900

Synonyms
- Anguilla sahelalmae Davis, 1887

Extinct genus of fishes

Pronotacanthus sahelalmae is an extinct spiny eel that lived in marine environments of what is now Lebanon during the Santonian.

== See also ==
- Prehistoric fish
- List of prehistoric bony fish
