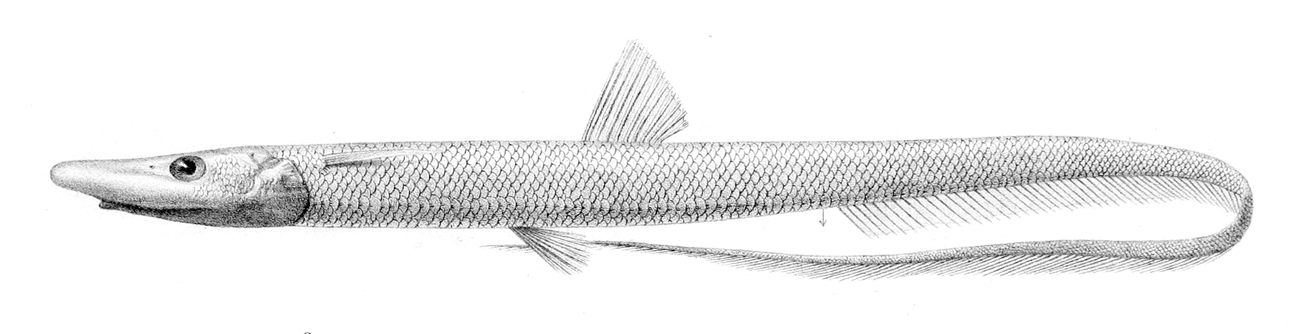

Conservation status
- Least Concern (IUCN 3.1)

Scientific classification
- Kingdom: Animalia
- Phylum: Chordata
- Class: Actinopterygii
- Order: Notacanthiformes
- Family: Halosauridae
- Genus: Halosaurus
- Species: H. johnsonianus

Binomial name
- Halosaurus johnsonianus Vaillant, 1888

Synonyms
- Halosaurichthys johnsonianus (Vaillant 1888)

= Halosaurus johnsonianus =

Species of fish

Halosaurus johnsonianus, also called the Sahara halosaur, is a deep-sea fish in the family Halosauridae. It is found in the eastern Atlantic Ocean from southern Spain and Portugal to Mauritania, including the Azores and Canary Islands. It is a benthopelagic species living on the continental slope in depths from 800 to 2,200 m (2,600 to 7,200 ft). It grows to 50 cm (20 in) total length.

Halosaurus johnsonianus is not a fishery species, and no significant threats to it are known.
