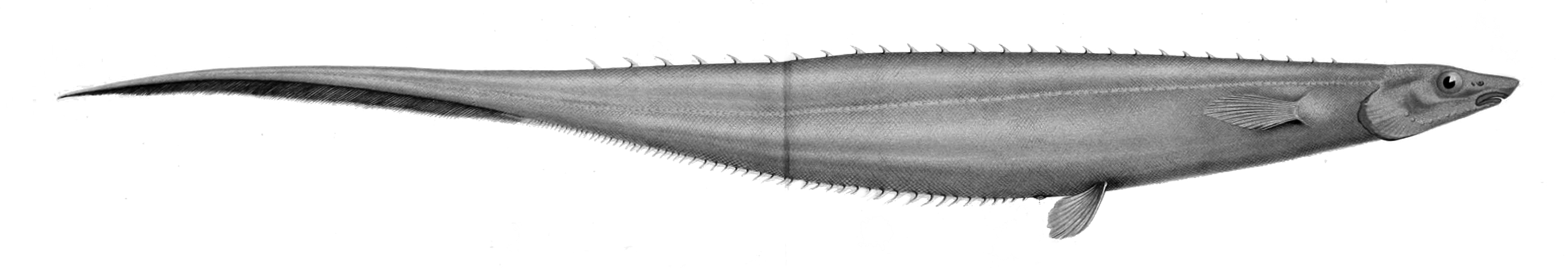

Scientific classification
- Domain: Eukaryota
- Kingdom: Animalia
- Phylum: Chordata
- Class: Actinopterygii
- Order: Notacanthiformes
- Family: Notacanthidae
- Genus: Polyacanthonotus
- Species: P. rissoanus

Binomial name
- Polyacanthonotus rissoanus (De Filippi & Vérany, 1857)

Synonyms
- Macdonaldia rostrata Collett, 1889; Notacanthus rissoanus De Filippi & Verany, 1857; Notacanthus rostratus Collett, 1889; Paradoxichthys garibaldianus Giglioli, 1882; Polyacanthonotus rostratus Collett, 1889

= Smallmouth spiny eel =

Species of fish

The smallmouth spiny eel (Polyacanthonotus rissoanus), also called the shortspine tapirfish, is a species of deep-sea spiny eel.

== Description ==
The smallmouth spiny eel is silver or brown in colour, with a maximum length of 36 cm (14 in). It has 26–36 dorsal soft rays. It looks similar to Polyacanthonotus africanus but its lateral line is lighter and less distinct. It has a small mouth and a short preoral snout. Mature males are distinguished by their black nostrils.

== Habitat ==
The smallmouth spiny eel lives in the Arctic waters off of Canada and in the North Atlantic Ocean off of Iceland, Ireland and Great Britain; it has also been observed in the waters off South Africa and in the Tasman Sea. It is a benthic and bathydemersal species, living at depths of 500–2,800 m (1,600–9,200 ft).

== Behaviour ==
Polyacanthonotus rissoanus feeds on coelenterates, worms and crustaceans.
