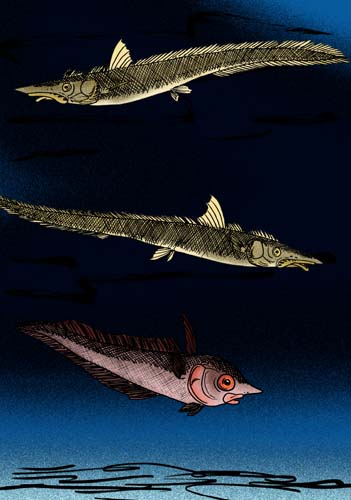
- L. californica and Bolbocara

Scientific classification
- Kingdom: Animalia
- Phylum: Chordata
- Class: Actinopterygii
- Division: Teleostei
- Order: Notacanthiformes
- Family: Halosauridae
- Genus: †Laytonia; David, 1943

Species
- L. californica David, 1943; ?L. zemorrensis David, 1948

= Laytonia =

Laytonia Temporal range: Upper Miocene Potential Late Eocene to Early Miocene records

Extinct genus of fish

Laytonia is an extinct genus of prehistoric halosaur that lived in deep water off the North American Pacific Coast during the Late Miocene. It is one of the few known halosaurs known from fossil remains.

A single definitive species is known, L. californica David, 1943, known from at least one complete skeleton from the Modelo Formation, as well as potentially one partial fossil skull and fossil scales from other Late Miocene deposits from unknown geologic formations. In addition, a potential second species, ?L. zemorrensis David, 1948 is known from isolated scales from the Zemorrian (comprising either the latest Oligocene or lower Miocene)-aged drill cores from the Central Valley, and potentially the Late Eocene or early Oligocene-aged Bastendorff Formation of Oregon.

According to the fossils of L. californica, the living animals were very slender, and had a long, fringe-like dorsal fin running almost the entire length of the body, from the head to the tip of the tail. The dorsal fin forms two crests, a first, low crest on top of the back of the head, and a second, large crest near the upper back, above the pectoral fins. Laytonia appears to have been driven to extinction shortly after the Late Miocene, when tectonic uplift effectively destroyed the genus' habitat by making the deep water too shallow.

The name comes from discoverer of the fossil, Melvin E. Layton.

== See also ==
- Echidnocephalus, another genus of fossil halosaur
- Prehistoric fish
- List of prehistoric bony fish
