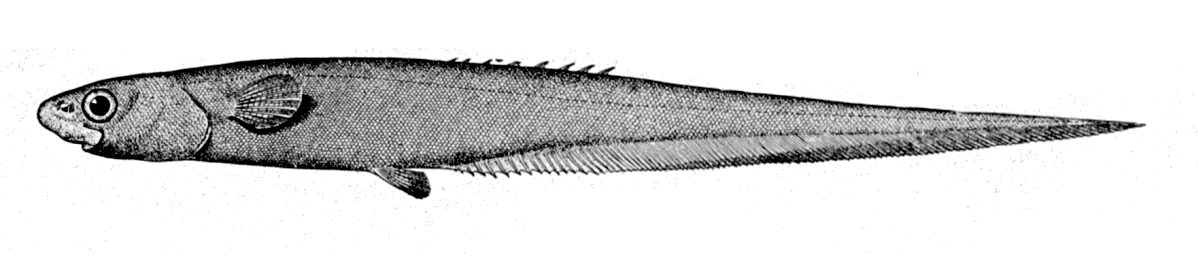

Scientific classification
- Kingdom: Animalia
- Phylum: Chordata
- Class: Actinopterygii
- Order: Notacanthiformes
- Family: Notacanthidae
- Genus: Notacanthus
- Species: N. sexspinis

Binomial name
- Notacanthus sexspinis J. Richardson, 1846

Synonyms
- Gigliolia moseleyi Goode & Bean, 1895; Notacanthus annectens Boulenger, 1903; Notacanthus moseleyi (Goode & Bean, 1895)

= Spiny-back eel =

Species of fish

The spiny-back eel, Notacanthus sexspinis, is a deep-sea spiny eel of the genus Notacanthus, found in all the Southern Hemisphere oceans at depths between 500 and 1,000 m (1,600 and 3,300 ft). The length of this fish is up to 60 cm (24 in).

== Description ==
The spiny-back eel is a slender, laterally compressed, elongated fish that can reach a length of 60 cm (24 in). The snout projects above a small mouth on the underside of the head, and head and body are clothed in tiny cycloid scales. As with other members of the family Notacanthidae, there are no teeth on the maxillary bones and the premaxillary teeth form a comblike cutting edge. The dorsal fin takes the form of between six and fifteen isolated spines, with no soft rays. The anal fin is very long; it has ten to eighteen spines at the front and one hundred and fifty or more soft rays behind. The pelvic fin is in the middle of the abdomen and has one to three spines, and the caudal fin is minute. The general colour of this fish is brown, with darker brown around the mouth and on the soft-ray section of the anal fin.

== Distribution ==
The spiny-back eel is a deep sea, demersal fish, living at depths between about 500 and 1,000 m (1,600 and 3,300 ft) in the Southern Hemisphere, in subtropical, temperate and subpolar waters. Its range includes the continental slope of South Africa, from Walvis Bay to Durban, the continental slope of South America from Brazil to Chile, and the continental slope to the south of Australia from Western Australia to Tasmania and New South Wales, as well as New Zealand. It is also found on knolls and seamounts.

== Ecology ==
As a demersal fish, the spiny-back eel feeds on the seabed, consuming polychaete worms, small crustaceans and coelenterates. There are many more females than males, and mature males in breeding condition can be recognised by their darkened nostrils.
