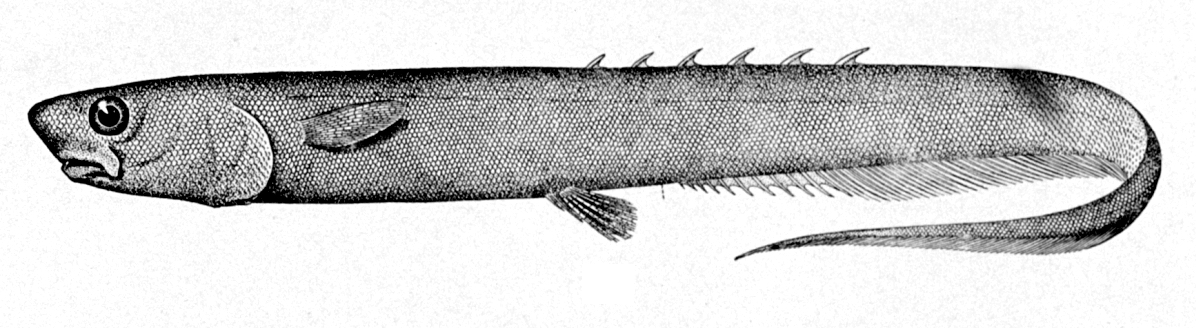

Conservation status
- Least Concern (IUCN 3.1)

Scientific classification
- Kingdom: Animalia
- Phylum: Chordata
- Class: Actinopterygii
- Division: Teleostei
- Order: Notacanthiformes
- Family: Notacanthidae
- Genus: Notacanthus
- Species: N. bonaparte

Binomial name
- Notacanthus bonaparte Risso, 1840

Synonyms
- Notacanthus mediterraneus De Filippi & Verany, 1857

= Shortfin spiny eel =

Species of ray-finned fish

The shortfin spiny eel (Notacanthus bonaparte), also called Bonaparte's spiny eel, is a member of the family Notacanthidae, the deep-sea spiny eels, which are not true eels (Anguilliformes).

== Distribution ==
The shortfin spiny eel lives in the Eastern Atlantic and Mediterranean Sea; it has been found in the Adriatic Sea. It lives in the bathypelagic zone at depths of 487–2,000 m (1,598–6,562 ft).

== Description ==
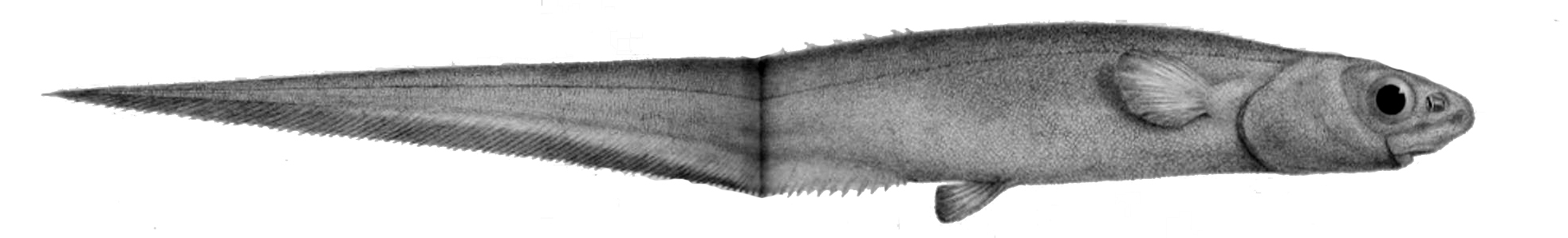
Another drawing

Notacanthus bonaparte is grey or pink in colour and has a maximum length of 26 cm (10 in). It has a short snout, long head, mouth on the underside. Its dorsal fin has up to nine spines, while the anal fin is long and has up to fourteen spines. Males are smaller and have enlarged nasal rosettes.

== Behaviour ==
The shortfin spiny eel feeds on bryozoans, ophiuroids, amphipods and sponges.

== Life cycle ==
The shortfin spiny eel spawns in June and July in the Mediterranean.
