= Halosaurus radiatus =

Scientific classification
- Domain: Eukaryota
- Kingdom: Animalia
- Phylum: Chordata
- Class: Actinopterygii
- Order: Notacanthiformes
- Family: Halosauridae
- Genus: Halosaurus
- Species: H. radiatus

Binomial name
- Halosaurus radiatus Garman, 1899

Species of fish

Halosaurus radiatus is a fish in the family Halosauridae. It occurs in the Eastern Pacific Ocean.

Halosaurus radiatus is a benthopelagic deep-water fish known from depths between 474 and 935 m (1,555 and 3,068 ft).
