= Longnose tapirfish =

Conservation status
- Least Concern (IUCN 3.1)

Scientific classification
- Kingdom: Animalia
- Phylum: Chordata
- Class: Actinopterygii
- Order: Notacanthiformes
- Family: Notacanthidae
- Genus: Polyacanthonotus
- Species: P. challengeri

Binomial name
- Polyacanthonotus challengeri (Vaillant, 1888)

Synonyms
- Macdonaldia alta Gill & Townsend, 1897; Macdonaldia challengeri (Vaillant, 1888); Macdonaldia longa Gill & Townsend, 1897; Notacanthus challengeri Vaillant, 1888; Polyacanthonotus altus (Gill & Townsend, 1897); Polyacanthonotus longus (Gill & Townsend, 1897)

Species of ray-finned fish

The longnose tapirfish (Polyacanthonotus challengeri) is a species of deep-sea spiny eel that lives in bathypelagic environments, and is a host of an endoparasite, Brachyenteron rissoanum.

== Habitat and distribution ==
P. challengeri lives in the North and South Pacific, near and in areas such as Japan, Bering Sea, British Columbia, Oregon, New Zealand, and other oceans in areas like South Africa, and the Kerguelen Islands. It has been reported from areas at Azores, Canary Islands, and Morocco.

It lives in depths from 777 to 4560 meters, but is usually found at 2000 to 3000 meters deep, living in benthopelagic areas near hard and soft substrate. It feeds on benthic invertebrates such as amphipod crustaceans, polychaete worms, and mysid shrimp.

Specimens of this fish were found near New Zealand, and the Kerguelen Islands.

== Description ==
P. challengeri can grow up to a length of 60 cm. It can have 32 - 35 dorsal spines, with a very small caudal fin, and its anal fin can have 161 - 162 rays altogether, with 26 - 35 being spines, that are low and long, merging with the caudal fin, and its pectoral fins being fleshy at the base.

== Conservation ==
No major threats exist for this species, and there are no conservation actions in place. It has an unknown population, but it is unlikely that this fish will be affected by any disturbances. The IUCN Red List places it as a least concern species.
