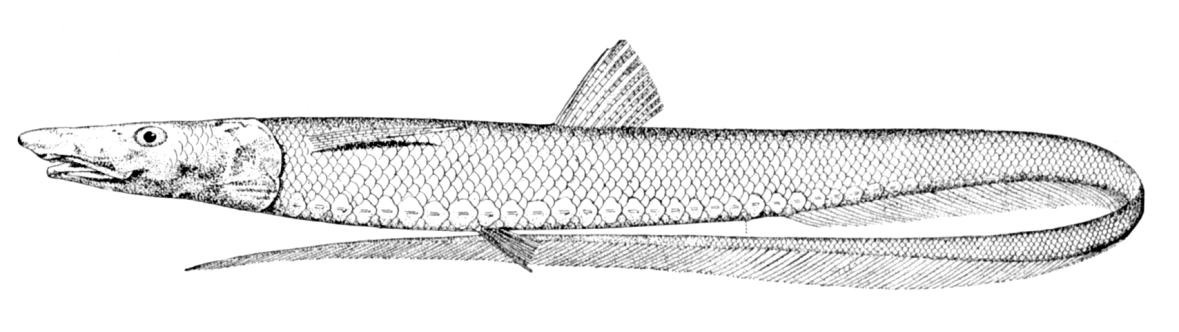

Conservation status
- Least Concern (IUCN 3.1)

Scientific classification
- Kingdom: Animalia
- Phylum: Chordata
- Class: Actinopterygii
- Order: Notacanthiformes
- Family: Halosauridae
- Genus: Aldrovandia
- Species: A. phalacra

Binomial name
- Aldrovandia phalacra (Vaillant, 1888)

Synonyms
- Halosaurus phalacrus Vaillant, 1888; Halosaurichthys nigerrimus Alcock, 1898; Halosauropsis kauaiensis Gilbert, 1905; Aldrovandia kauaiensis (Gilbert 1905); Halosauropsis verticalis Gilbert, 1905

= Aldrovandia phalacra =

Species of ray-finned fish

Aldrovandia phalacra, the Hawaiian halosaurid, is a species of ray-finned fish in the family Halosauridae. It is a circumglobal species found at bathyal depths.

== Description ==
Aldrovandia phalacra is a long, slim, cylindrical fish growing to a length of 40 to 50 centimetres (16 to 20 in). The snout is pointed with the upper jaw longer than the lower jaw. There are several separate palatine patches with teeth on the roof of the mouth. There are no scales on the snout, head or operculum. Mature males with ripe gonads have their nostrils extended into a dark coloured tube. There is a row of 24 to 28 large scales along the lateral line. The dorsal fin has 10 to 12 soft rays, the ventral fin has 1 spine and 8 soft rays and the pectoral fin has 1 spine and 11 to 13 soft rays. The head is steely blue, darker below, with a dark line edging the gill covers. The body is pale grey.

== Distribution ==
Aldrovandia phalacra is a deep water fish, living at depths of 500 to 2,300 metres (1,600 to 7,500 ft). It is found in warm waters on the continental shelf, around islands and in the vicinity of seamounts. Its range includes the Eastern Atlantic between 15° N and 45° N, the Western Atlantic at similar latitudes, the coastal shelves of South Africa and Brazil, the Indian Ocean and the vicinity of Hawaii. During exploratory trawls round the Bear Seamount, it was the commonest species of fish.

== Behaviour ==
Aldrovandia phalacra is benthopelagic. It hovers within a few metres of the seabed, darting down to catch the small invertebrates on which it feeds. These include amphipods, mysids, copepods and Polychaete|polychaete worms.
