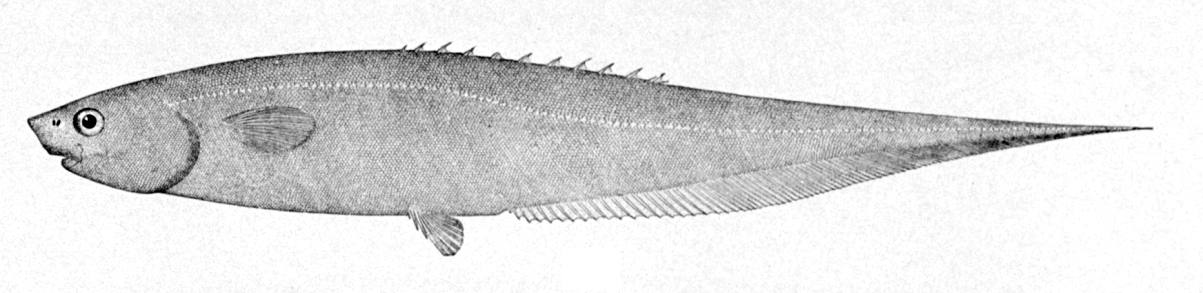
- Snubnosed spiny eel, Notacanthus chemnitzii.

Scientific classification
- Kingdom: Animalia
- Phylum: Chordata
- Class: Actinopterygii
- Order: Notacanthiformes
- Family: Notacanthidae
- Genus: Notacanthus; Bloch, 1788

Type species
- Notacanthus chemnitzii Bloch 1788

Synonyms
- Campylodon Fabricius 1793; Acanthonotus Bloch & Schneider 1801; Helorus Goode 1880 (Preocc.); Gigliolia Goode & Bean 1895 (Preocc.); Tiluropsis Roule 1911

= Notacanthus =

Genus of fishes

Notacanthus is a genus of spiny eels in the family Notacanthidae.

== Species ==
It currently contains these recognized species:

- Notacanthus abbotti Fowler, 1934 (Mindanao spiny eel)
- Notacanthus arrontei Bañón, Barros-García, Baldó, Cojan & Carlos, 2024
- Notacanthus bonaparte A. Risso, 1840 (Shortfin spiny eel)
- Notacanthus chemnitzii Bloch, 1788 (Snub-nosed spiny eel)
- Notacanthus indicus Lloyd, 1909 (Arabian spiny eel)
- Notacanthus laccadiviensis Konhamkakkada, Kinattumkara, Raghavan & Sivanpillai, 2023
- Notacanthus sexspinis J. Richardson, 1846 (Spiny-back eel)
- Notacanthus spinosus Garman, 1899 (Panama spiny-back eel)
