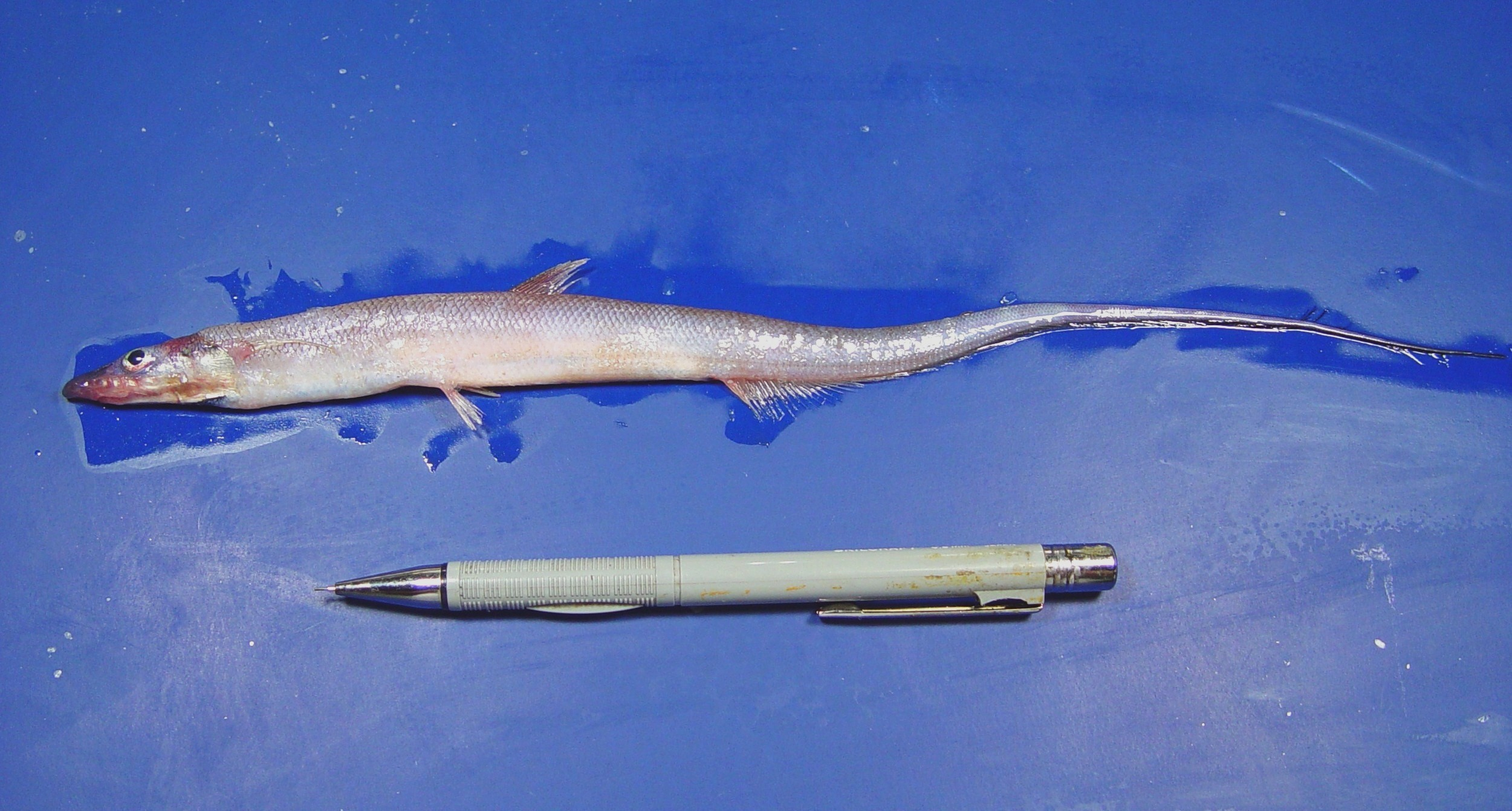

Conservation status
- Least Concern (IUCN 3.1)

Scientific classification
- Kingdom: Animalia
- Phylum: Chordata
- Class: Actinopterygii
- Order: Notacanthiformes
- Family: Halosauridae
- Genus: Aldrovandia
- Species: A. gracilis

Binomial name
- Aldrovandia gracilis Goode & T. H. Bean, 1896

= Aldrovandia gracilis =

Species of ray-finned fish

Aldrovandia gracilis, also known as the gracile halosaur, is a species of ray-finned fish in the family Halosauridae. It is found in the north west Atlantic and the Gulf of Mexico on the continental shelf and slope. It feeds on benthic invertebrates including bivalve molluscs, amphipods, mysids, polychaete worms and brittle stars.
