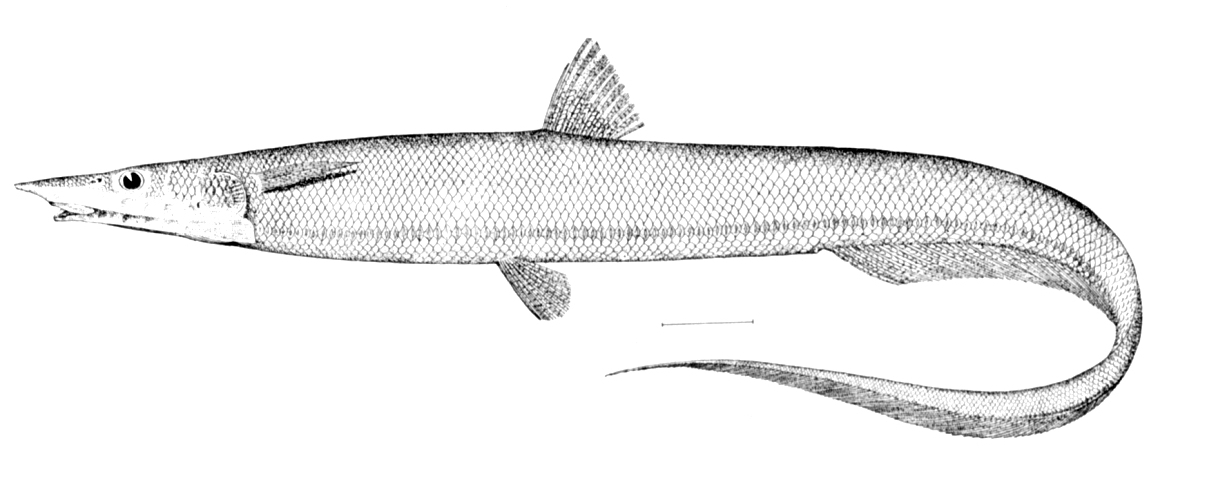

Conservation status
- Least Concern (IUCN 3.1)

Scientific classification
- Domain: Eukaryota
- Kingdom: Animalia
- Phylum: Chordata
- Class: Actinopterygii
- Order: Notacanthiformes
- Family: Halosauridae
- Genus: Halosaurus
- Species: H. ovenii

Binomial name
- Halosaurus ovenii Johnson, 1864

= Halosaurus ovenii =

Oven's halosaur

Species of fish

Halosaurus ovenii, also called the Oven's halosaur, is a deep-sea fish in the family Halosauridae. It is found in the eastern Atlantic where it is widely distributed in tropical and subtropical waters along both coasts. In the Mediterranean, H. ovenii is considered rare. It can reach up to 60 cm in length.
