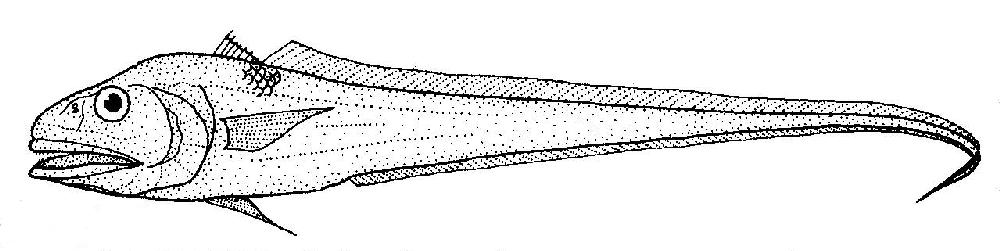
- Drawing by Dr Tony Ayling

Scientific classification
- Kingdom: Animalia
- Phylum: Chordata
- Class: Actinopterygii
- Order: Gadiformes
- Suborder: Macrouroidei
- Family: Bathygadidae
- Genus: Bathygadus
- Species: B. cottoides

Binomial name
- Bathygadus cottoides Günther, 1878

= Codheaded rattail =

Species of fish

The codheaded rattail (Bathygadus cottoides) is a rattail of the genus Bathygadus, found in the southeast Atlantic Ocean and the southwest Pacific Oceans, at depths of between 1,000 and 1,600 m. Its length is between 20 and 30 cm.
