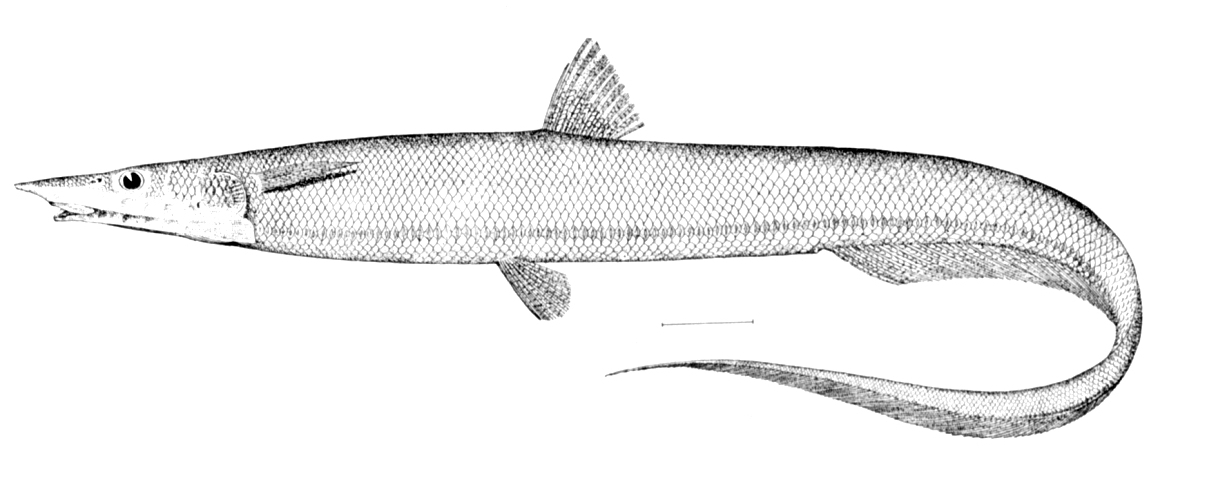
- Halosaurus ovenii

Scientific classification
- Kingdom: Animalia
- Phylum: Chordata
- Class: Actinopterygii
- Order: Notacanthiformes
- Family: Halosauridae
- Genus: Halosaurus; J. Y. Johnson, 1864

Species
- See text

Synonyms
- Halosaurichthys Alcock 1889

= Halosaurus =

Genus of fishes

Halosaurus is a genus of fish in the family Halosauridae. This genus currently contains the following recognized species:

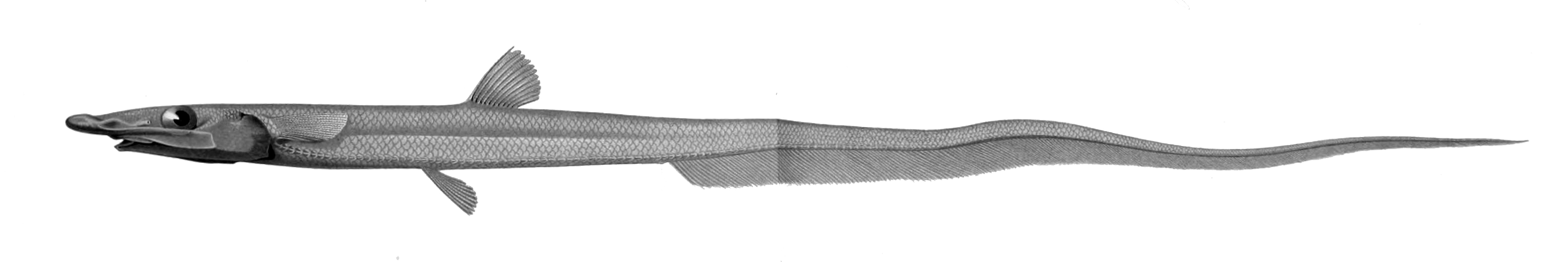
Halosaurus johnsonianus

- Halosaurus attenuatus Garman, 1899 (Galapagos halosaur)
- Halosaurus carinicauda (Alcock, 1889) (Andaman halosaur)
- Halosaurus guentheri Goode & T. H. Bean, 1896 (Guenther's halosaur)
- Halosaurus johnsonianus Vaillant, 1888 (Sahara halosaur)
- †Halosaurus orthensis Nolf 2002
- Halosaurus ovenii J. Y. Johnson, 1864 (Madeira halosaur)
- Halosaurus pectoralis McCulloch, 1926 (Goanna fish)
- Halosaurus radiatus Garman, 1899 (Albatross halosaur)
- Halosaurus ridgwayi (Fowler, 1934) (Ridgeway's halosaur)
- Halosaurus sinensis T. Abe, 1974 (Chinese halosaur)
