= Bathygadus nipponicus =

Scientific classification
- Domain: Eukaryota
- Kingdom: Animalia
- Phylum: Chordata
- Class: Actinopterygii
- Order: Gadiformes
- Family: Macrouridae
- Subfamily: Bathygadinae
- Genus: Bathygadus
- Species: B. nipponicus

Binomial name
- Bathygadus nipponicus Jordan & Gilbert, 1904

Synonyms
- Regania nipponica Jordan & Gilbert, 1904

Species of fish

Bathygadus nipponicus is a species of rattail. This is a deep-water fish found in the waters around southern Japan and northern Taiwan.

This species grows to around 57 cm (22.4 in) in length. It has a fairly wide mouth with a low, broad snout, large eyes and no chin barbel. The mouth is terminal with very small, conical teeth.
