= Goanna (disambiguation) =

A goanna is any of several Australian monitor lizards of the genus Varanus.

Goanna may also refer to:

- Goanna fish, Halosaurus pectoralis
- Goanna (band), an Australian folk-rock band
- "The Goanna", a codename for Australian businessman Kerry Packer, used in media reports about the Costigan Commission
