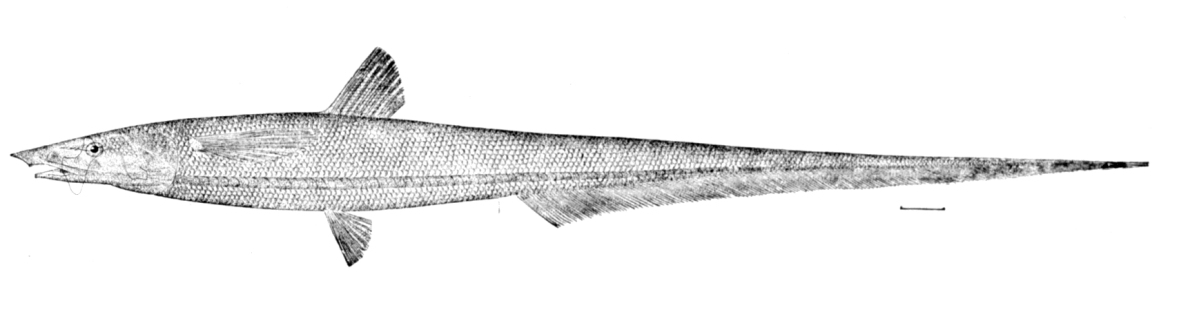
- Abyssal halosaur, Halosauropsis macrochir

Conservation status
- Least Concern (IUCN 3.1)

Scientific classification
- Kingdom: Animalia
- Phylum: Chordata
- Class: Actinopterygii
- Order: Notacanthiformes
- Family: Halosauridae
- Genus: Halosauropsis; Collett, 1896
- Species: H. macrochir

Binomial name
- Halosauropsis macrochir (Günther, 1878)

Synonyms
- Halosaurus macrochir Günther 1878; Aldrovandia macrochir (Günther 1878); Halosaurus goodei Gill 1883; Halosaurus niger Gilchrist 1906

= Abyssal halosaur =

Species of ray-finned fish

The abyssal halosaur (Halosauropsis macrochir) is a species of bottom-dwelling, deep-sea fish in the family Halosauridae that is found in all oceans at depths from 1100 to 3500 meters. It is the only member of its genus.

The abyssal halosaur can reach total length of at least 76 centimetres (30 in) and weight in excess of 400 grams (14 oz). Berstad et al. could not sex fish smaller than 25 cm, giving an indication that maturation must occur at when individuals grow to a certain length. Abyssal halosaurs are also long-lived, with maximum reported age of 36 years, although individuals sampled on the Mid-Atlantic Ridge were mostly younger than 20 years. The species appears to be an opportunistic feeder, mostly taking epibenthos and small fish.
