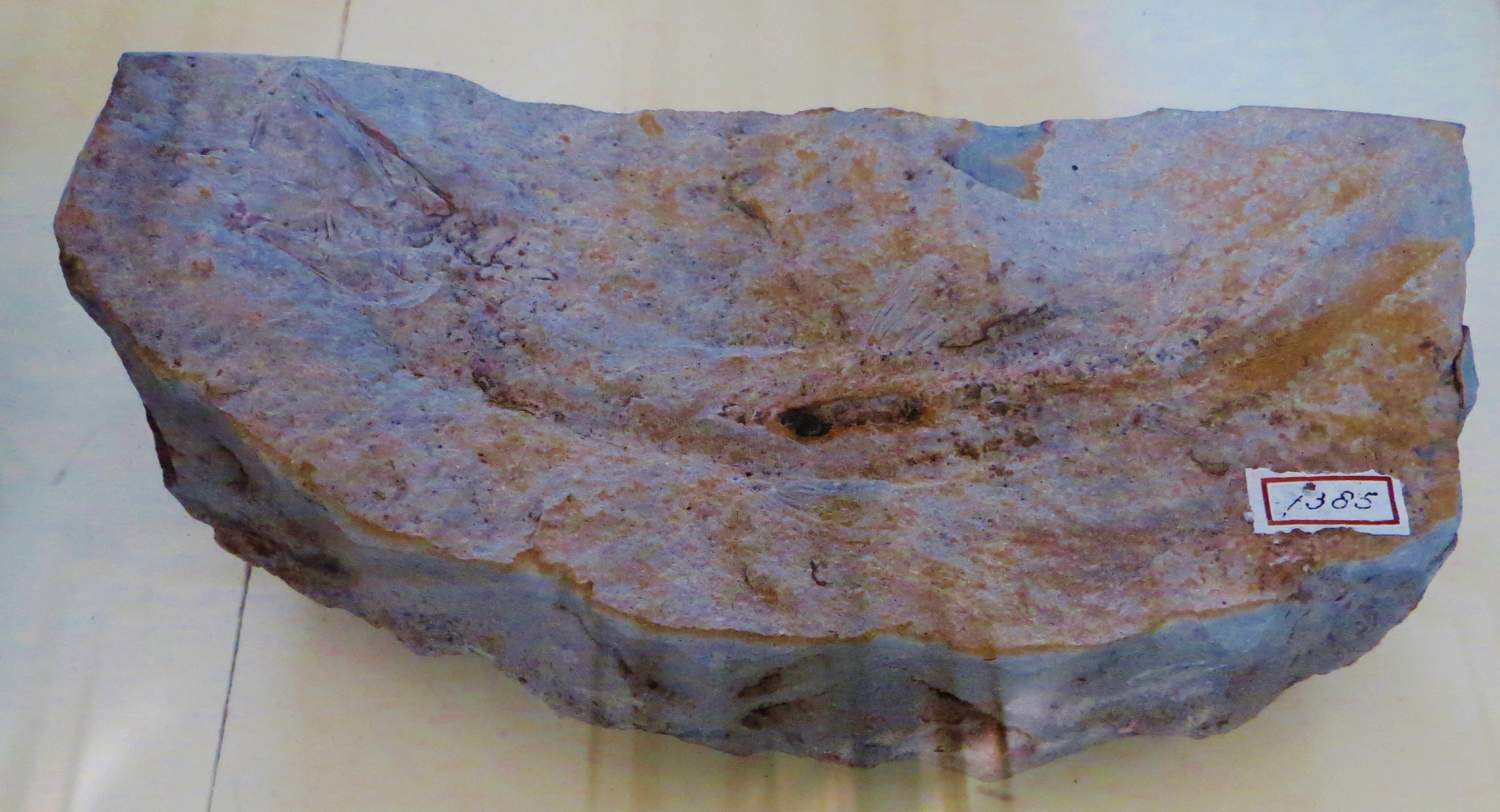
- Fossil of Echidnocephalus troscheli

Scientific classification
- Domain: Eukaryota
- Kingdom: Animalia
- Phylum: Chordata
- Class: Actinopterygii
- Order: Notacanthiformes
- Family: Halosauridae
- Genus: †Echidnocephalus von der Marck, 1858

Type species
- †Echidnocephalus troscheli von der Marck, 1858

Species
- †E. troscheli von der Marck, 1858; ?†E. americanus Cockerell, 1919; ?†E. pacificus Cockerell, 1919

= Echidnocephalus =

Echidnocephalus Temporal range: Late Campanian Possible Coniacian and Maastrichtian occurrence

Extinct genus of fishes

Echidnocephalus (Greek for "Echidna's head") is an extinct genus of prehistoric halosaur known from the Late Cretaceous. It is the earliest known definitive member of the order Notacanthiformes.

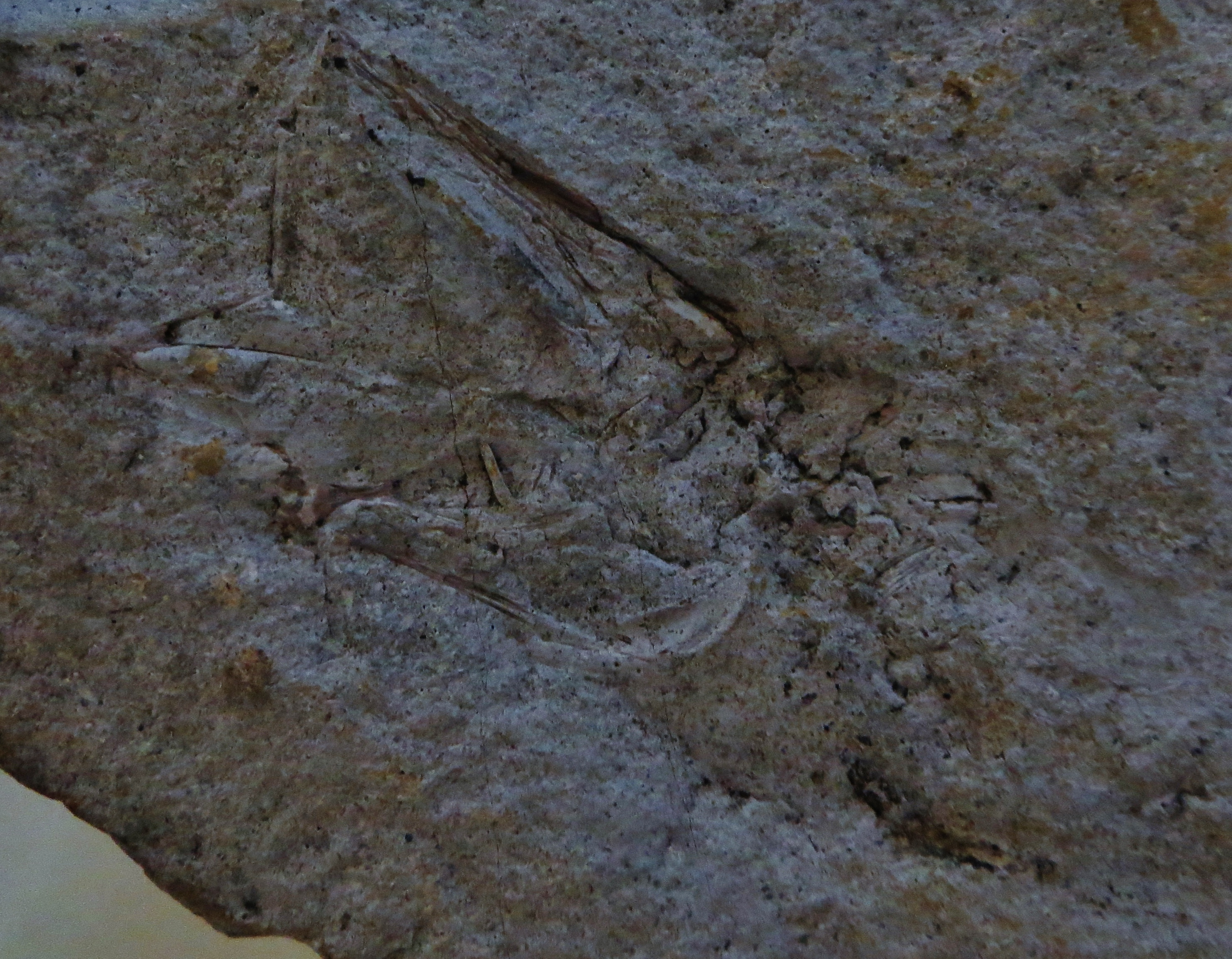
Close-up of skull

It contains one definitive species known from complete and partial specimens: E. troscheli (=E. tenuicaudus von der Marck, 1858) from the late Campanian-aged Ahlen Formation of Westphalia, Germany. These body fossils suggest an animal already very similar to modern halosaurs.

In addition, two disputed species known only from isolated fossil scales very similar to those of modern halosaurs have been described from North America: ?E. americanus Cockerell, 1919 from the Coniacian-aged Mancos Shale of Wyoming and ?E. pacificus Cockerell, 1919 from the Maastrichtian-aged Moreno Formation of California.

== See also ==
- Laytonia, a Miocene genus of fossil halosaur
- Prehistoric fish
- List of prehistoric bony fish
