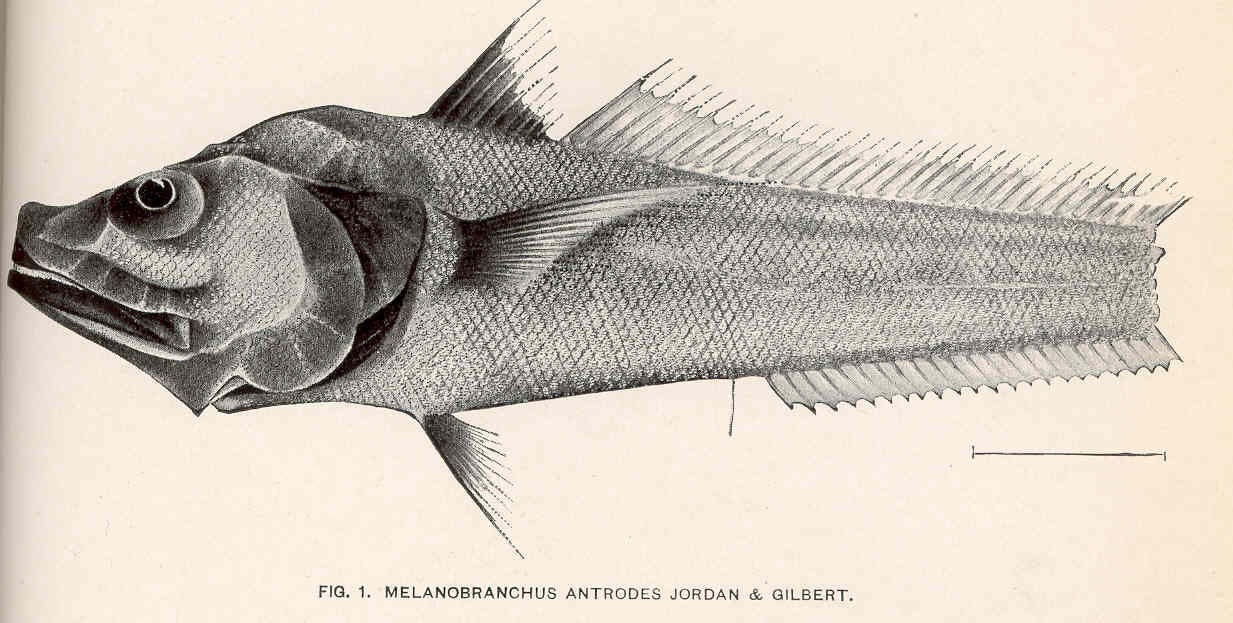

Scientific classification
- Domain: Eukaryota
- Kingdom: Animalia
- Phylum: Chordata
- Class: Actinopterygii
- Order: Gadiformes
- Family: Macrouridae
- Subfamily: Bathygadinae
- Genus: Bathygadus
- Species: B. antrodes

Binomial name
- Bathygadus antrodes (Jordan & Starks, 1904)

Synonyms
- Melanobranchus antrodes Jordan & Starks, 1904

= Bathygadus antrodes =

Species of fish

Bathygadus antrodes is a gadiform fish, a species of rattail. It is found at depths of up to 1200 m (3937 ft) in the waters around southern Japan and northern Taiwan.

This fish is known to grow to around 65 cm (25.5 in). It has a very wide, soft-boned head, a terminal mouth with very small teeth, small eyes and no barbel. The scales are small and deciduous.
