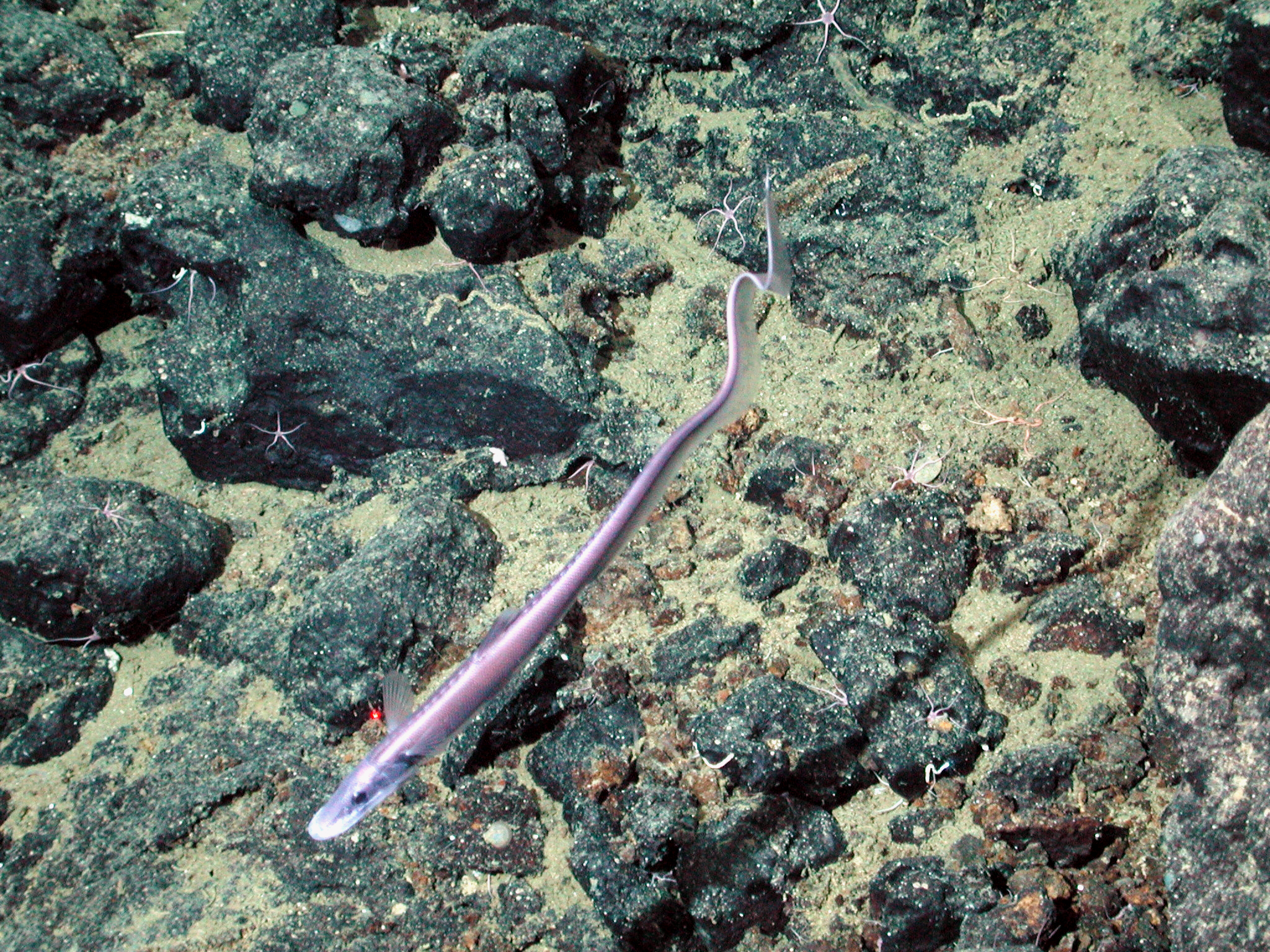
- Aldrovandia sp.

Scientific classification
- Kingdom: Animalia
- Phylum: Chordata
- Class: Actinopterygii
- Order: Notacanthiformes
- Family: Halosauridae
- Genus: Aldrovandia; Goode & T. H. Bean, 1896

Species
- See text

= Aldrovandia =

Genus of ray-finned fishes

Aldrovandia is a genus of ray-finned fish in the family Halosauridae. They occur in the Pacific, Atlantic, and Indian Oceans. They can reach 55 cm (22 in) in total length.

== Species ==
This genus currently contains the following recognized species:

- Aldrovandia affinis (Günther, 1877) (Gilbert's halosaur)
- Aldrovandia gracilis Goode & T. H. Bean, 1896 (gracile halosaur)
- Aldrovandia mediorostris (Günther, 1887) (Challenger halosaur)
- Aldrovandia oleosa Sulak, 1977 (Bahamas halosaur)
- Aldrovandia phalacra (Vaillant, 1888) (Hawaiian halosaur)
- Aldrovandia rostrata (Günther, 1878) (rostrate halosaur)

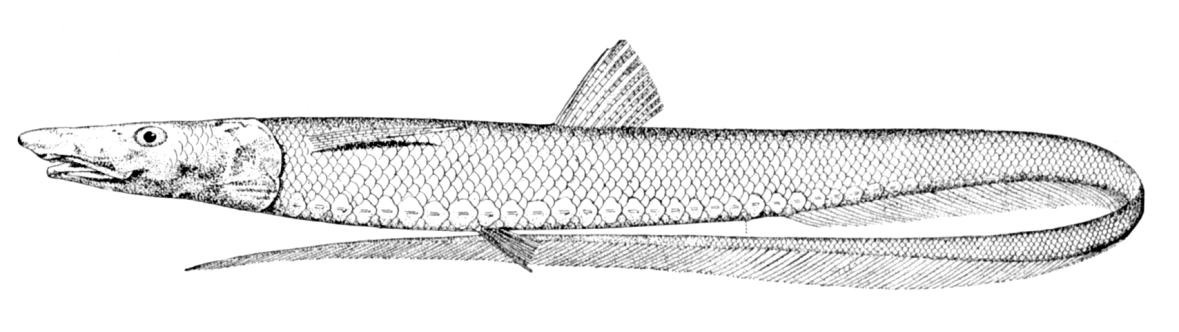
Hawaiian halosaur, Aldrovandia phalacra

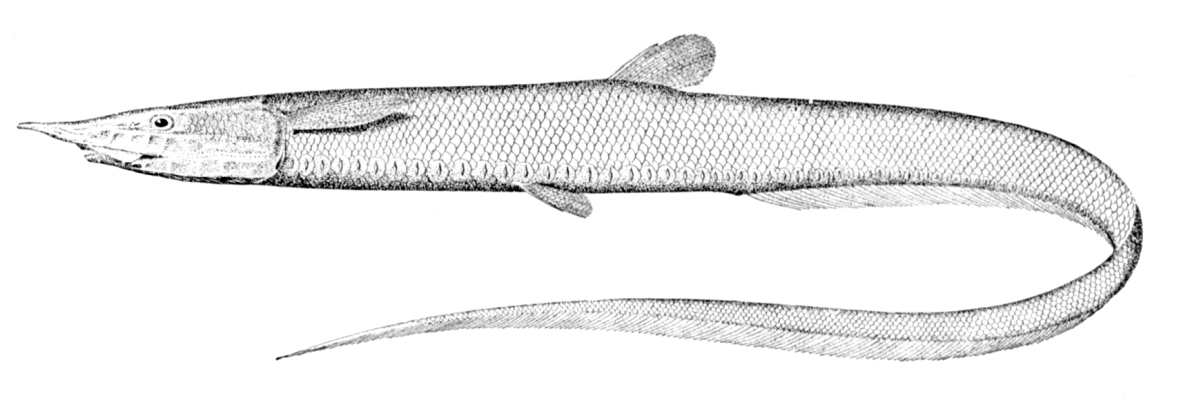
Aldrovandia rostrata
