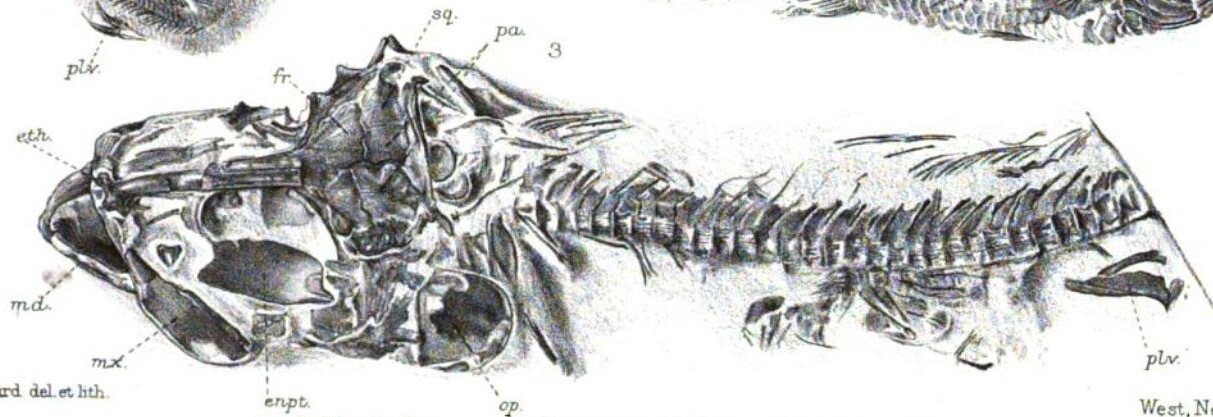
- Specimen of E. anglicus

Scientific classification
- Kingdom: Animalia
- Phylum: Chordata
- Class: Actinopterygii
- Superorder: Elopomorpha
- Genus: †Enchelurus von der Marck 1863

Type species
- †Enchelurus villosus von der Marck, 1863

Species
- E. anglicus Woodward 1901; E. syriacus Woodward 1901; E. villosus von der Marck 1863

= Enchelurus =

Enchelurus Temporal range: Cenomanian to Campanian

Extinct genus of fishes

Enchelurus (Greek for "eel tail") is an extinct genus of prehistoric marine ray-finned fish that lived during the Late Cretaceous. It contains three species, known from the Cenomanian to Campanian of Europe and the Middle East.

The following species are known:

- E. anglicus Woodward, 1901 - mid-late Cenomanian of England (English Chalk)
- E. syriacus Woodward, 1901 - Santonian of Lebanon (Sahel Alma)
- E. villosus von der Marck, 1863 (type species) - Campanian of Germany (Baumberge Formation)

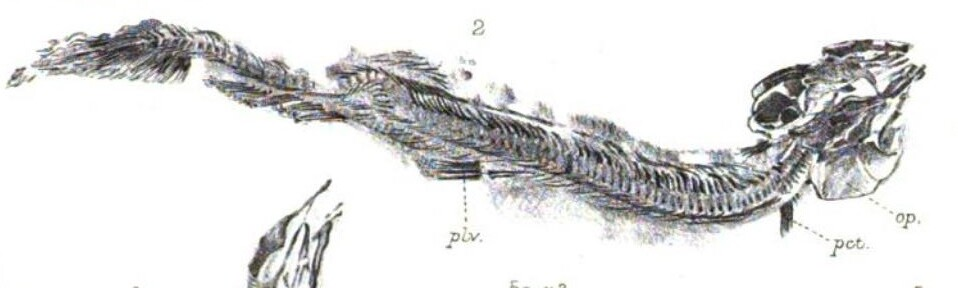
Specimen of E. syriacus

Its taxonomic affinity remains uncertain; it was initially classified as an early halosaur in the order Notacanthiformes, and continues to be treated as such by some authorities. However, other studies have found it to be an elopomorph related to the common ancestor of Anguilliformes and Notacanthiformes, or even an early anguilliform itself.
