= Bathygadus garretti =

Scientific classification
- Domain: Eukaryota
- Kingdom: Animalia
- Phylum: Chordata
- Class: Actinopterygii
- Order: Gadiformes
- Family: Macrouridae
- Subfamily: Bathygadinae
- Genus: Bathygadus
- Species: B. garretti

Binomial name
- Bathygadus garretti C. H. Gilbert & C. L. Hubbs, 1916

Species of fish

Bathygadus garretti is a species of rattail. This is a deep-water fish found in the waters around southern Japan and northern Taiwan.

This fish grows to a length of around 50 cm. It has a fairly wide, firm-boned head, terminal mouth with very small, conical teeth and large eyes. The scales are small, thin and deciduous.

The fish is named in honor of Lieut. Commander LeRoy Mason Garrett (1857-1906) of the U.S. Navy. He was the commander of the fisheries steamer Albatross, from which the type specimen was collected, because of his contributions to the success of a 1906 expedition to the Northwest Pacific. Garrett was lost overboard during a storm on the return voyage from Japan.
