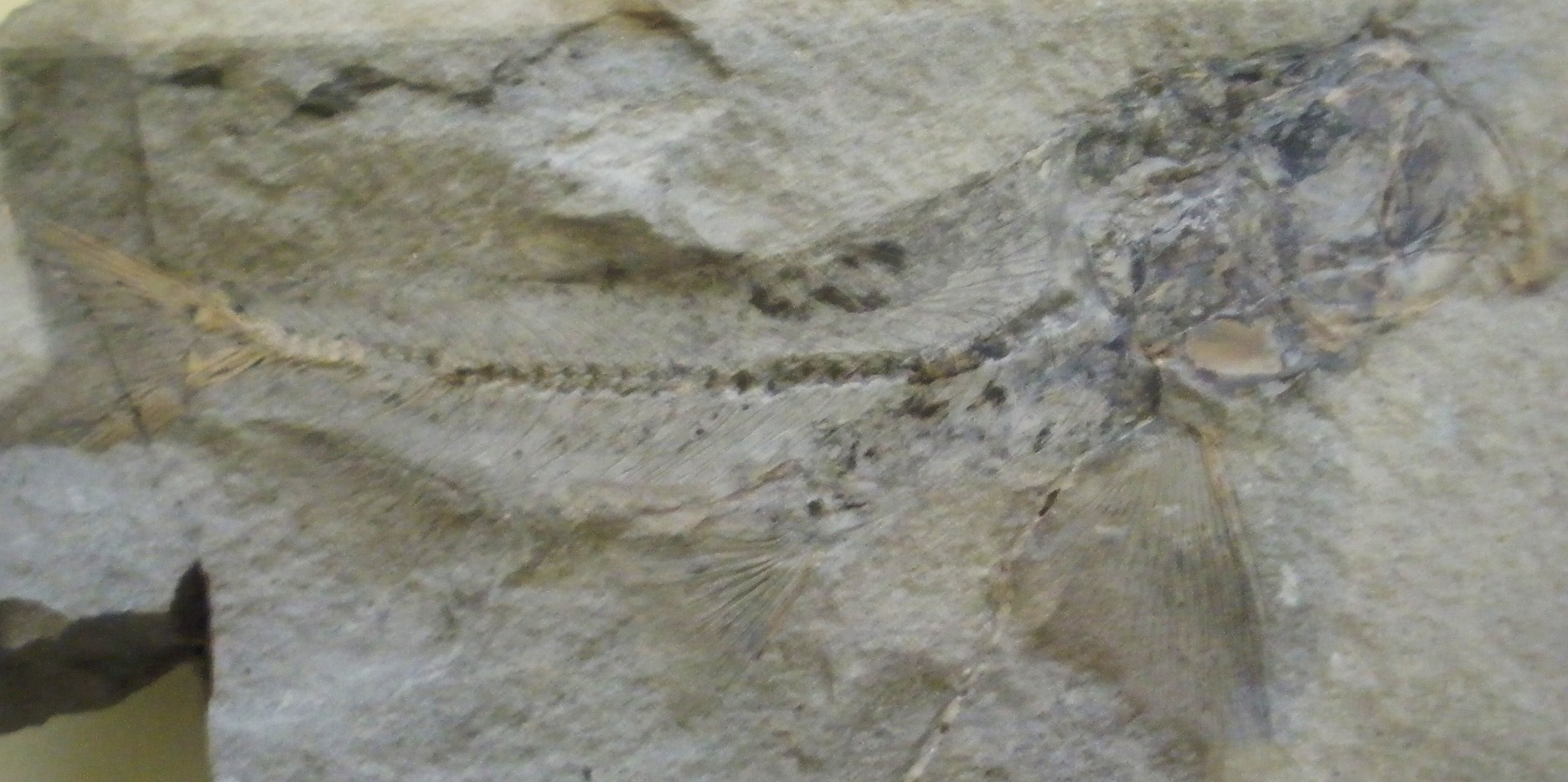
- Specimen of H. macrodactyla

Scientific classification
- Kingdom: Animalia
- Phylum: Chordata
- Class: Actinopterygii
- Order: Clupeiformes
- Genus: †Histiothrissa; Woodward, 1901

Type species
- †Sardinius macrodactylus von der Marck, 1858

Species
- †H. crassapinna (Davis, 1889); †H. macrodactyla (von der Marck, 1858)

= Histiothrissa =

Histiothrissa Temporal range: Santonian to Campanian

Extinct genus of fishes

Histiothrissa is an extinct genus of prehistoric marine clupeiform ray-finned fish known from the Late Cretaceous of Europe & the Middle East.

It contains the following species:

- H. crassapinna (Davis, 1889) - Santonian of Lebanon (Sahel Alma)
- H. macrodactyla (von der Marck, 1858) (type species) - Campanian of Germany (Ahlen Formation)
