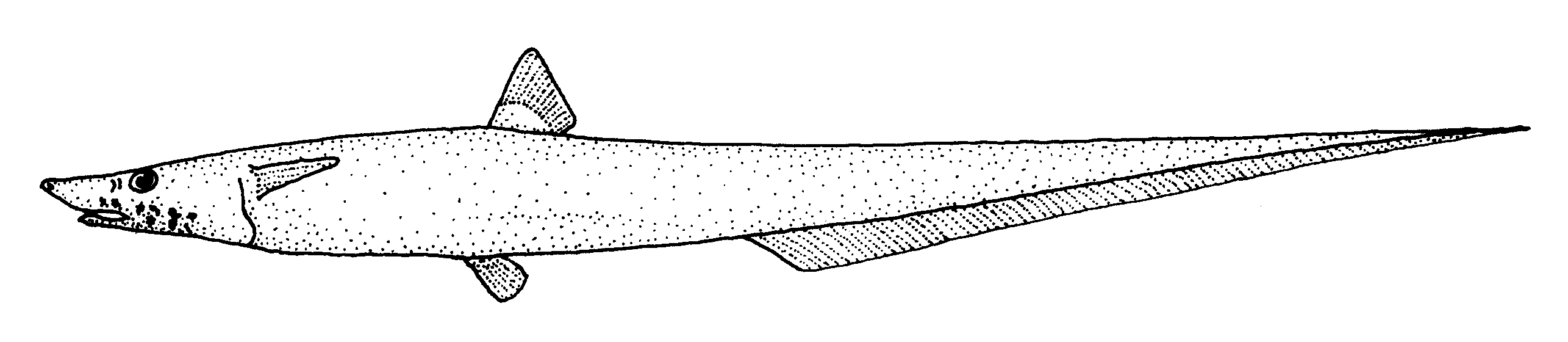
- Drawing by Dr Tony Ayling

Scientific classification
- Kingdom: Animalia
- Phylum: Chordata
- Class: Actinopterygii
- Order: Notacanthiformes
- Family: Halosauridae
- Genus: Halosaurus
- Species: H. pectoralis

Binomial name
- Halosaurus pectoralis McCulloch, 1926

= Goanna fish =

Species of fish

The goanna fish (Halosaurus pectoralis), also known as Australian halosaur or common halosaur, is a halosaur species of deep-sea fish in the genus Halosaurus, found in the southwestern Pacific Ocean.
