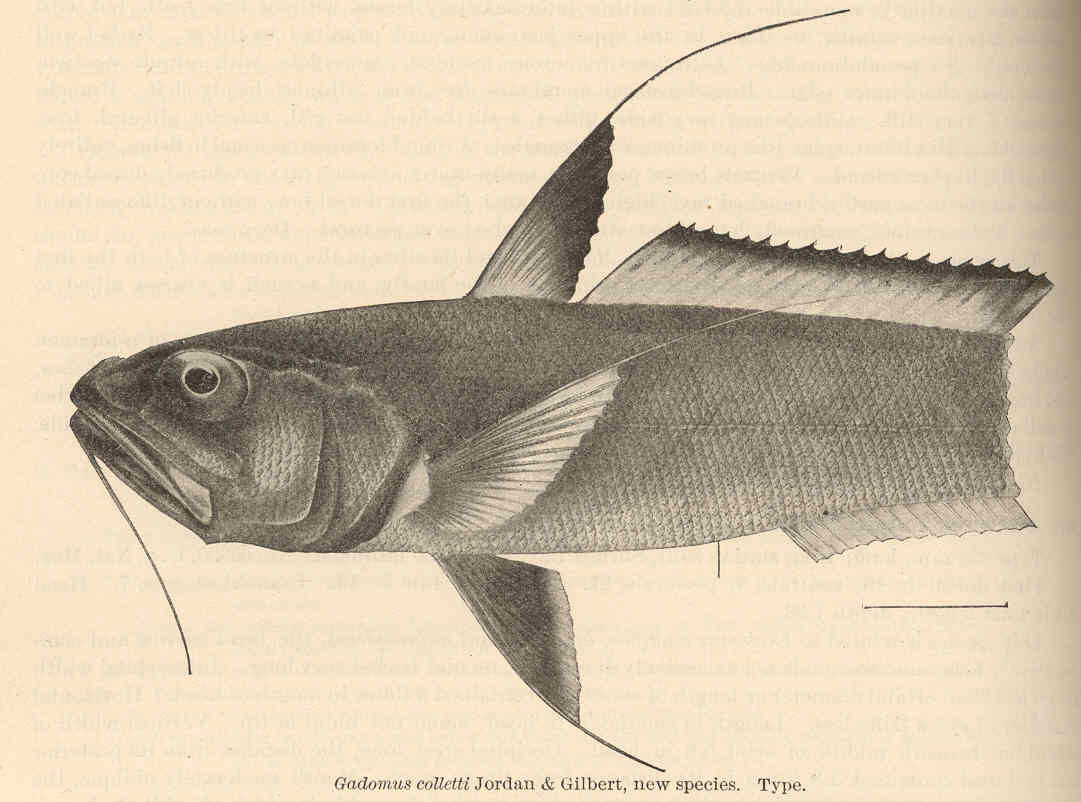

Scientific classification
- Domain: Eukaryota
- Kingdom: Animalia
- Phylum: Chordata
- Class: Actinopterygii
- Order: Gadiformes
- Family: Macrouridae
- Subfamily: Bathygadinae
- Genus: Gadomus
- Species: G. colletti

Binomial name
- Gadomus colletti Jordan & Gilbert, 1904

Synonyms
- Bathygadus colletti (Jordan & Gilbert, 1904)

= Gadomus colletti =

Species of fish

Gadomus colletti is a species of rattail. This deep-water fish is found in the waters around Japan, the Philippines, and northern Taiwan.

This species grows to around 40 cm (15.7 in) in length. This is a very pale fish with darker fins and white jaws. The head, unlike in many deep-water species, has firm bones and the mouth is wide and terminal with bands of villiform (brushlike) teeth. A long, filamentous chin barbel and a wide gill opening are present.
