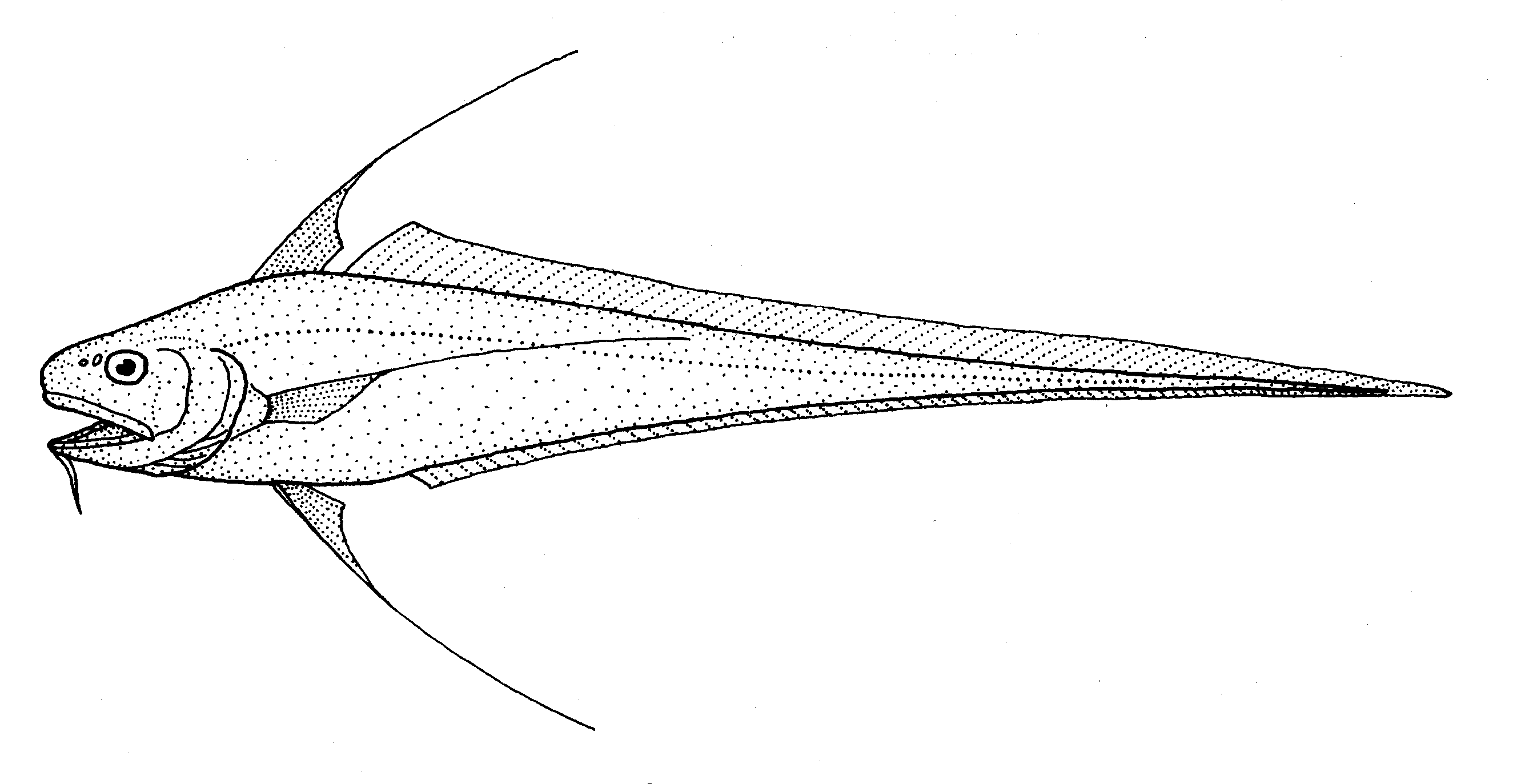
- Drawing by Dr Tony Ayling

Scientific classification
- Domain: Eukaryota
- Kingdom: Animalia
- Phylum: Chordata
- Class: Actinopterygii
- Order: Gadiformes
- Family: Macrouridae
- Subfamily: Bathygadinae
- Genus: Gadomus
- Species: G. aoteanus

Binomial name
- Gadomus aoteanus McCann & McKnight, 1980

= Filamentous rattail =

Species of fish

The filamentous rattail (Gadomus aoteanus) is a rattail of the genus Gadomus, found around New Zealand.
