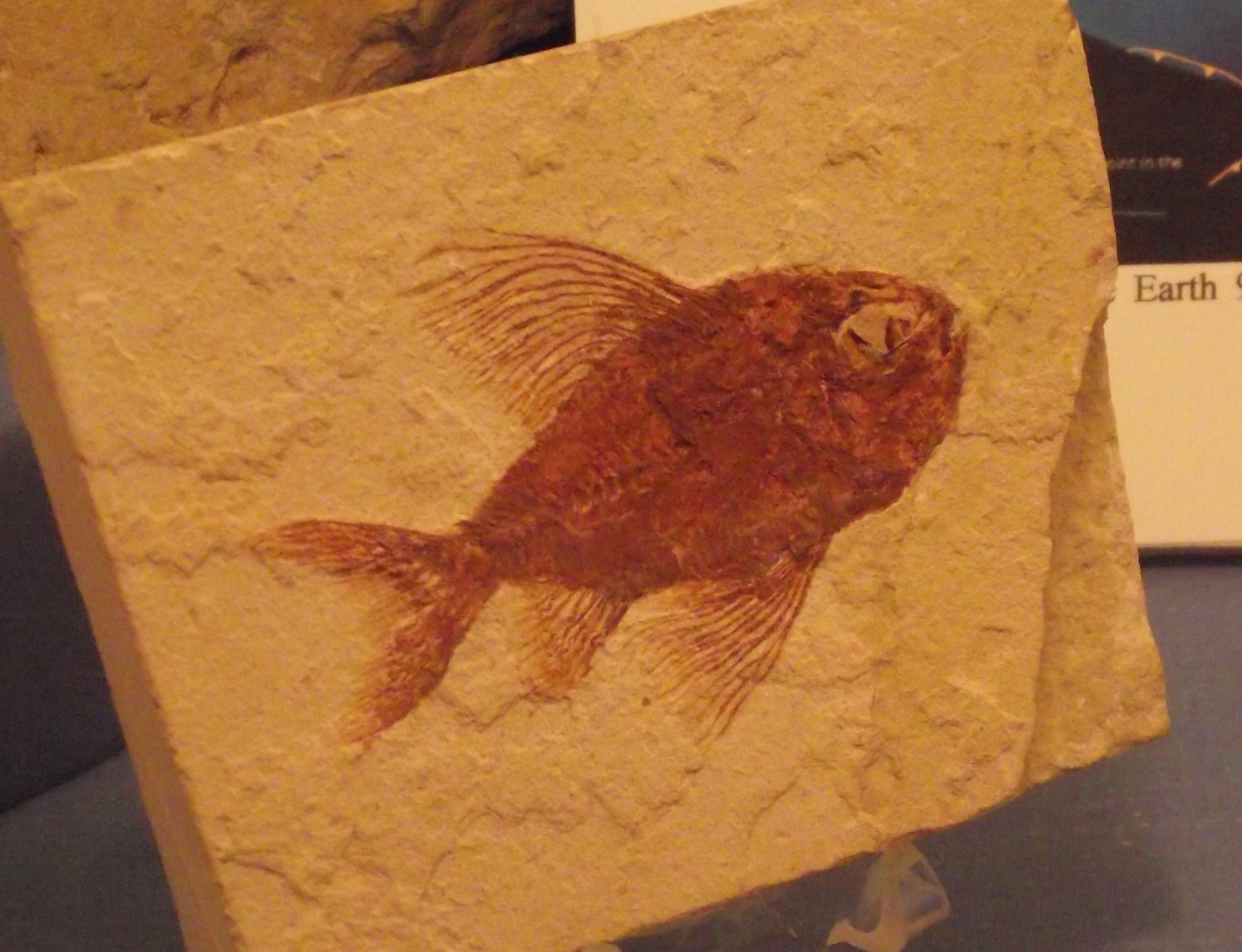

Scientific classification
- Domain: Eukaryota
- Kingdom: Animalia
- Phylum: Chordata
- Class: Actinopterygii
- Order: Beryciformes
- Suborder: Holocentroidei
- Genus: †Alloberyx; Gaudant, 1969

Species
- A. syriacus (Pictet & Humbert, 1866); A. robustus (Gaudant, 1969)

= Alloberyx =

Alloberyx Temporal range: Late Santonian

Extinct genus of fishes

Alloberyx is an extinct genus of prehistoric marine ray-finned fish, possibly a holocentrid, that lived during the Santonian of Lebanon, from the Sahel Alma site. It contains two species, A. syriacus, initially described as a species of Pseudoberyx, and A. robustus, initially classified in the genus Serratocentrus.

It is generally considered a stem-holocentrid, due to having close morphological similarities to modern holocentrid fish while lacking the characteristics known in the two modern subfamilies. However, another similar "holocentroid", Caproberyx, was more recently recovered as an indeterminate acanthomorph due to lacking many of the traits found among holocentrids, and it has been suggested that a similar level of uncertainty may apply to Alloberyx.

== See also ==
- Prehistoric fish
- List of prehistoric bony fish
