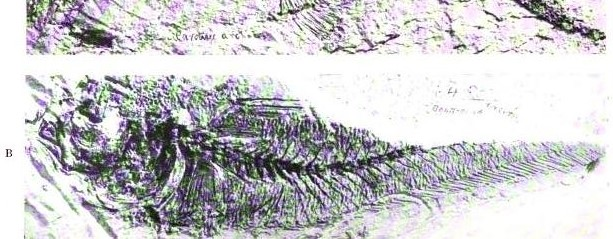
- Type specimen of B. gyrinus

Scientific classification
- Kingdom: Animalia
- Phylum: Chordata
- Class: Actinopterygii
- Order: Gadiformes
- Family: Bathygadidae
- Genus: †Bolbocara; Jordan, 1927
- Species: †B. gyrinus

Binomial name
- †Bolbocara gyrinus Jordan, 1927

= Bolbocara =

Bolbocara Temporal range: Upper Miocene

Extinct genus of fishes

Bolbocara is an extinct genus of rattail that lived during the Upper Miocene subepoch of Southern California. It contains a single species, B. gyrinus. It may be related to the extant genus Bathygadus.

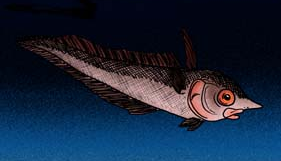
Life restoration of B. gyrinus

It is known from the Monterey Formation near Lompoc.

== See also ==
- Prehistoric fish
- List of prehistoric bony fish
