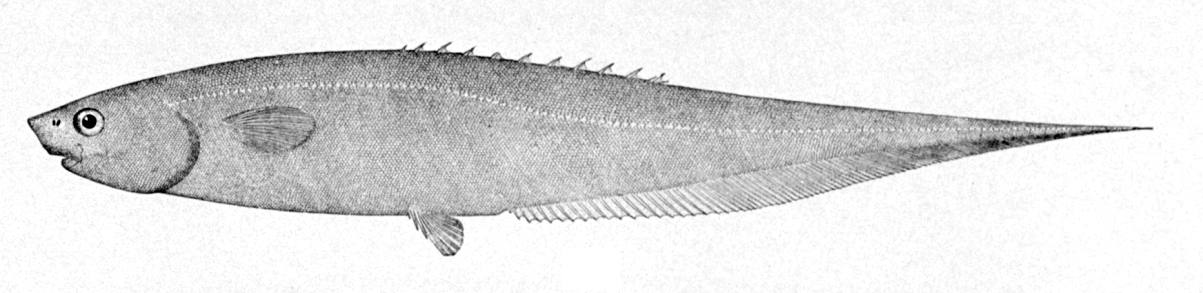

Conservation status
- Least Concern (IUCN 3.1)

Scientific classification
- Kingdom: Animalia
- Phylum: Chordata
- Class: Actinopterygii
- Order: Notacanthiformes
- Family: Notacanthidae
- Genus: Notacanthus
- Species: N. chemnitzii

Binomial name
- Notacanthus chemnitzii Bloch, 1788

= Snub-nosed spiny eel =

Species of ray-finned fish

The snub-nosed spiny eel (Notacanthus chemnitzii) is a member of the family Notacanthidae, the deep-sea spiny eels, which are not true eels (Anguilliformes). The snub-nosed spiny eel exists in waters all over the world, except in the tropics, ranging in color from light tan to bluish grey in small ones to dark brown in large ones. Its primary food is sea anemones. The eel usually lives in deep waters, mostly more than 200 m below the surface. Female snub-nosed spiny eels reach maturity around 18 years old, and are larger than 55 cm in length at maturity. Males reach maturity around 14 years and are larger than 66 cm in length.

== Morphology ==
The snub-nosed spiny eel has 19-37 premaxillary teeth on each side. They have multiple rows of palatine and dentary teeth. Snub-nosed spiny eels have eyes that are approximately half the length of their snout. Their dorsal fins have 8-12 spines, and their anal fins have 20-21 spines.

== Distribution and habitat ==
The snub-nosed spiny eel can be found at a depth of 125 to 3285 m below the surface.

The snub-nosed spiny eel is found in the subarctic Atlantic, around Iceland, Greenland, Norway, and Eastern Canada. The most northern record of the snub-nosed spiny eel was in the northeast Atlantic off Bjørnsund, Norway. The snub-nosed spiny eel has been found in waters of Russia near the Kuril Islands, the Sea of Okhotsk and the Barents Sea. It is a rare species in many regions. Spawning fishes can be found in the northwestern Atlantic from October until March.
