= Ctenocephalichthys =

Ctenocephalichthys Temporal range: Cenomanian to Santonian

Scientific classification
- Domain: Eukaryota
- Kingdom: Animalia
- Phylum: Chordata
- Class: Actinopterygii
- Order: Beryciformes
- Suborder: Holocentroidei
- Genus: †Ctenocephalichthys; Gaudant, 1969

Type species
- †Ctenocephalichthys lorteri Gaudant, 1969

Species
- †C. brevispinus Gayet, 1982; †C. longispinus Gaudant, 1969; †C. lorteri Gaudant, 1969

Extinct genus of fishes

Ctenocephalichthys is an extinct genus of prehistoric marine ray-finned fish, generally considered a holocentriform, that lived during the Late Cretaceous. It is known from Cenomanian to the Santonian of Lebanon.

It contains the following species:

- †C. brevispinus Gayet, 1982 - Santonian of Lebanon (Sahel Alma) (=C. brevissimus Gayet, 1982)
- †C. longispinus Gaudant, 1969 - Cenomanian of Lebanon
- †C. lorteri Gaudant, 1969 - Santonian of Lebanon (type species)

== See also ==
- Prehistoric fish
- List of prehistoric bony fish
