= Gnathoberyx =

Gnathoberyx Temporal range: Santonian

Scientific classification
- Kingdom: Animalia
- Phylum: Chordata
- Class: Actinopterygii
- Order: Trachichthyiformes
- Genus: †Gnathoberyx; Patterson, 1967
- Species: †G. stigmosus

Binomial name
- †Gnathoberyx stigmosus Patterson, 1967

Extinct genus of fishes

Gnathoberyx is an extinct genus of marine trachichthyiform ray-finned fish that lived during the Late Cretaceous. It contains a single species, G. stigmosus from the Santonian-aged Sahel Alma site of Lebanon.

== See also ==
- Prehistoric fish
- List of prehistoric bony fish
