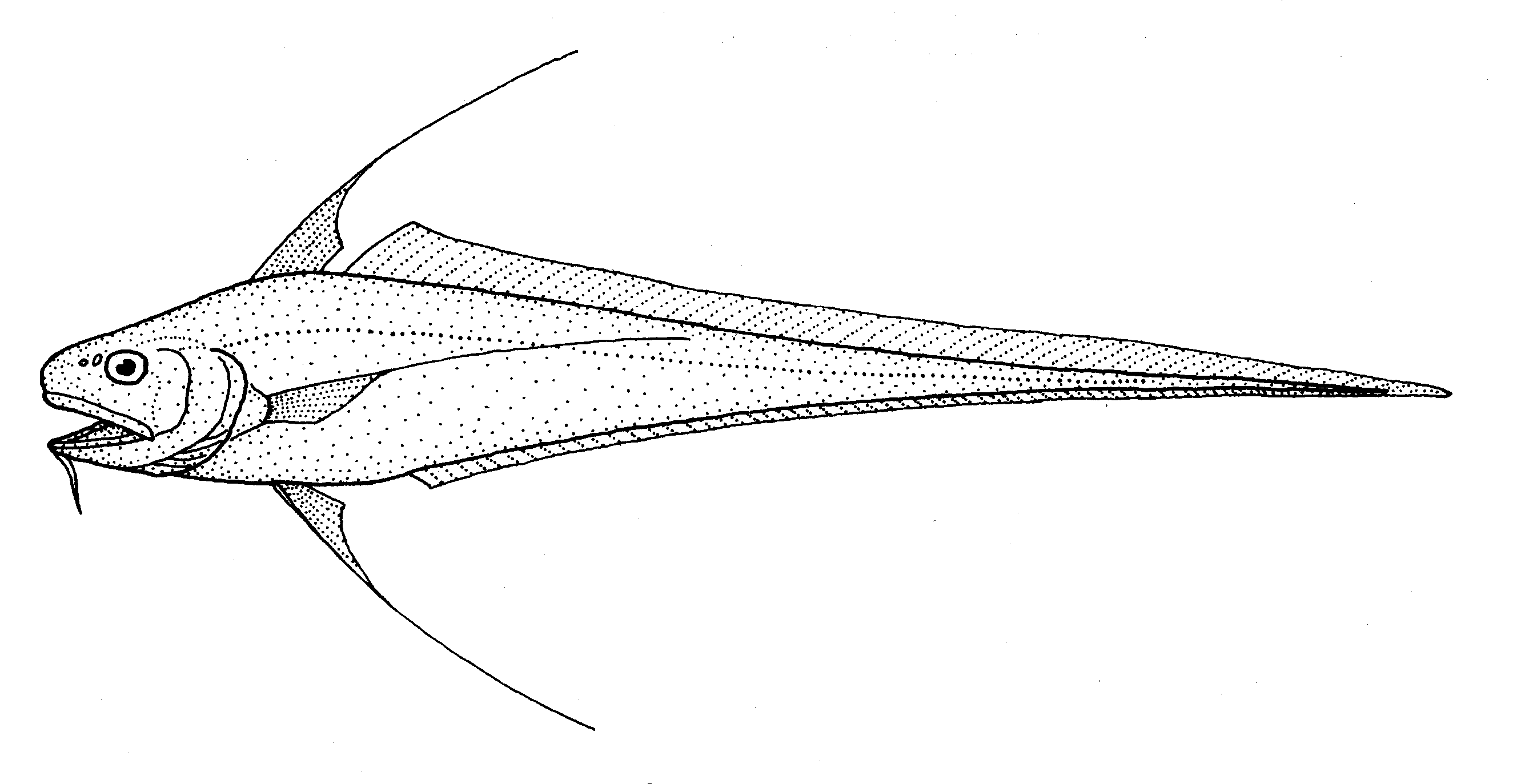
- Filamentous rattail, Gadomus aoteanus

Scientific classification
- Kingdom: Animalia
- Phylum: Chordata
- Class: Actinopterygii
- Order: Gadiformes
- Suborder: Macrouroidei
- Family: Bathygadidae
- Genus: Gadomus; Regan, 1903

Type species
- Bathygadus longifilis Goode & Bean, 1885

Species
- See text

= Gadomus =

Gadomus Temporal range: 14–0 Ma Late Miocene to Present

Genus of fishes

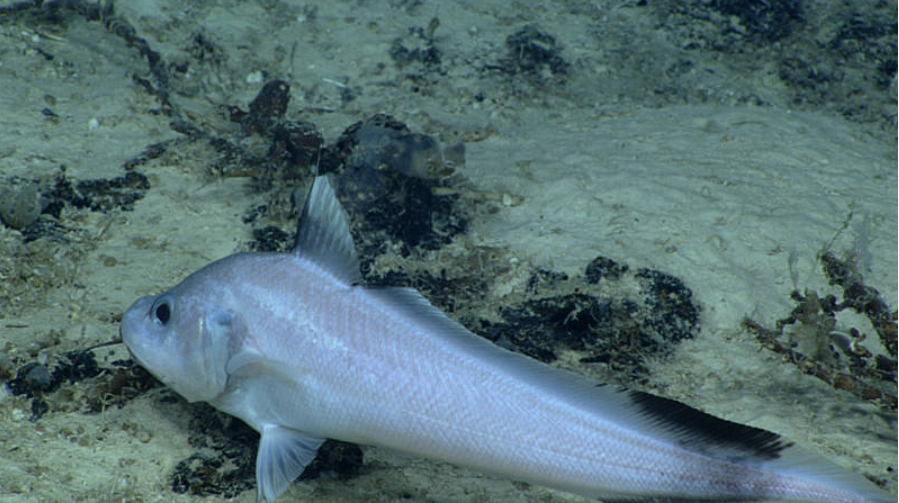
A doublethread grenadier (Gadomus arcuatus) in deep water off Puerto Rico in April 2015.

Gadomus is a genus of rattails in the family Bathygadidae.

== Species ==
The 13 currently recognized species in this genus are:

- Gadomus aoteanus McCann & McKnight, 1980 (filamentous rattail)
- Gadomus arcuatus (Goode & T. H. Bean, 1886) (doublethread grenadier)
- Gadomus capensis (Gilchrist & von Bonde, 1924)
- Gadomus colletti D. S. Jordan & C. H. Gilbert, 1904
- Gadomus denticulatus C. H. Gilbert & C. L. Hubbs, 1920
- Gadomus dispar (Vaillant, 1888)
- Gadomus filamentosus (H. M. Smith & Radcliffe, 1912)
- Gadomus introniger C. H. Gilbert & C. L. Hubbs, 1920 (blackmouth rattail)
- Gadomus longifilis (Goode & T. H. Bean, 1885) (threadfin grenadier)
- Gadomus magnifilis C. H. Gilbert & C. L. Hubbs, 1920
- Gadomus melanopterus C. H. Gilbert, 1905
- Gadomus multifilis (Günther, 1887)
- Gadomus pepperi Iwamoto & A. Williams, 1999 (blacktongue rattail)
