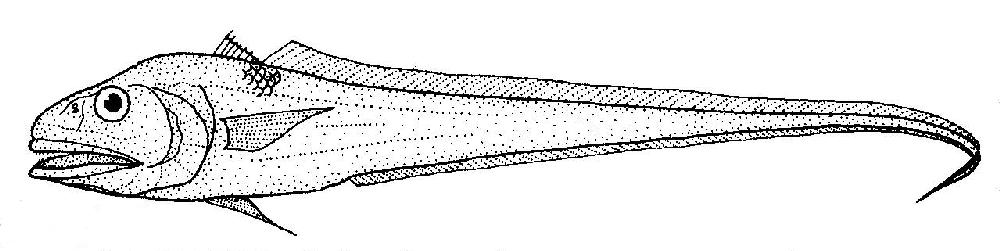
- Codheaded rattail, Bathygadus cottoides

Scientific classification
- Kingdom: Animalia
- Phylum: Chordata
- Class: Actinopterygii
- Order: Gadiformes
- Suborder: Macrouroidei
- Family: Bathygadidae
- Genus: Bathygadus; Günther, 1878

Type species
- Bathygadus cottoides Günther, 1878

Species
- See text.

= Bathygadus =

Bathygadus Temporal range: 48–0 Ma Middle Eocene to Present

Genus of fishes

Bathygadus is a genus of rattails of the family Bathygadidae.

== Species ==
There are currently 13 recognized species in this genus:

- Bathygadus antrodes (Jordan & Starks, 1904)
- Bathygadus bowersi (Gilbert, 1905)
- Bathygadus cottoides Günther, 1878 (Codheaded rattail)
- Bathygadus dubiosus Weber, 1913
- Bathygadus entomelas Gilbert & Hubbs, 1920
- Bathygadus favosus Goode & Bean, 1886
- Bathygadus furvescens Alcock, 1894 (Blackfin rattail)
- Bathygadus garretti Gilbert & Hubbs, 1916
- Bathygadus macrops Goode & Bean, 1885 (Bullseye grenadier)
- Bathygadus melanobranchus Vaillant, 1888 (Vaillant's grenadier)
- Bathygadus nipponicus (Jordan & Gilbert, 1904)
- Bathygadus spongiceps Gilbert & Hubbs, 1920 (Spongy rattail)
- Bathygadus sulcatus (H. M. Smith & Radcliffe, 1912)
