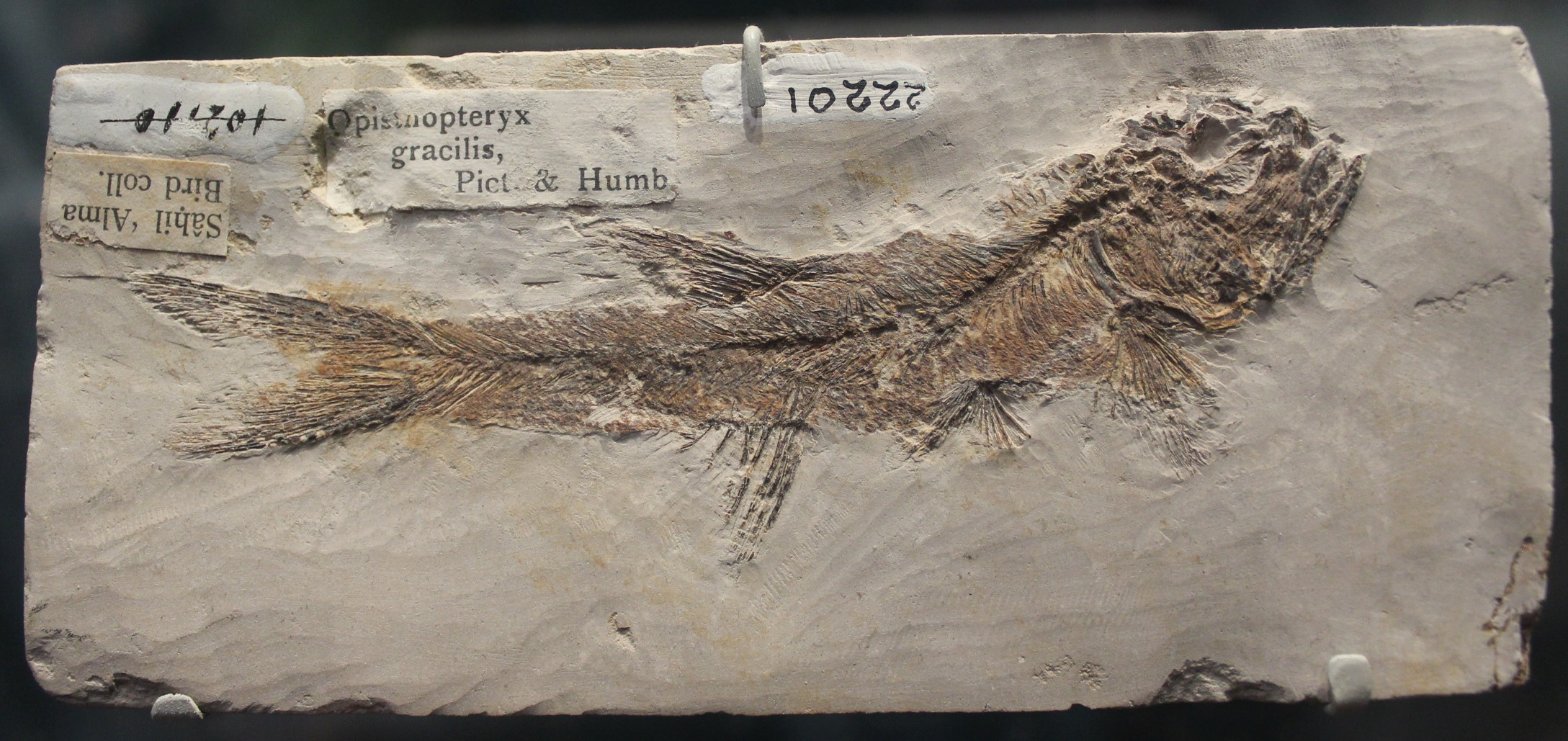
- O. gracilis fossil, National Museum of Natural History

Scientific classification
- Domain: Eukaryota
- Kingdom: Animalia
- Phylum: Chordata
- Class: Actinopterygii
- Order: Elopiformes
- Genus: †Opistopteryx; Pictet & Humbert, 1866

= Opistopteryx =

Opistopteryx Temporal range: Santonian

Extinct genus of fishes

Opistopteryx is an extinct genus of prehistoric ray-finned fish that lived during the Santonian.

== See also ==
- Prehistoric fish
- List of prehistoric bony fish
