= Sardinius =

Sardinius Temporal range: Campanian

Scientific classification
- Domain: Eukaryota
- Kingdom: Animalia
- Phylum: Chordata
- Class: Actinopterygii
- Order: Myctophiformes
- Genus: †Sardinius von der Marck, 1858

Extinct genus of fishes

Sardinius is an extinct genus of prehistoric ray-finned fish that lived during the Campanian.
