= Pantopholis =

Scientific classification
- Kingdom: Animalia
- Phylum: Chordata
- Class: Actinopterygii
- Order: Aulopiformes
- Family: †Enchodontidae
- Genus: †Pantopholis; Davis, 1887

Extinct genus of fishes

Pantopholis (meaning "more love") is a genus of prehistoric fish.
