= Parospinus =

Parospinus Temporal range: Santonian

Scientific classification
- Kingdom: Animalia
- Phylum: Chordata
- Class: Actinopterygii
- Order: Beryciformes
- Genus: †Parospinus; Gayet, 1982

Extinct genus of fishes

Parospinus is an extinct genus of prehistoric bony fish that lived during the Santonian.

== See also ==
- Prehistoric fish
- List of prehistoric bony fish
