= Sahel Alma =

Sahel Alma ساحل علما
- Village
- Location in Lebanon
- Coordinates: 33°59′39″N 35°39′5″E
- Country: Lebanon
- Governorate: Keserwan-Jbeil
- District: Keserwan
- Time zone: UTC+2 (EET)
  - Summer (DST): +3

Sahel Alma (Arabic: ساحل علما, romanized: Sāḥel ʿAlmā) is a village located in the Keserwan District of the Keserwan-Jbeil Governorate in Lebanon, it constitutes along with three other villages (Sarba, Haret Sakher and Ghadir) the area known as Jounieh. Sahel Alma is situated between the coast of Jounieh bay and the mountain of Harissa. It is one of the few villages on the Lebanese coast that still offers oId Lebanese houses, landscapes as well as traditions and family/neighbors relationships. The village is a known destination for hiking along the "Darb el Sama" trail that leads to Our Lady of Lebanon sanctuary.

== Etymology ==
Sahel Alma consists of two words in Arabic that mean, Sahel: Coast ساحل and Alma: On the water علماء. Some people also explain that Alma means العلماء - the scientists who used to visit the village to find fish fossils at the nearby fossil site of the same name.

== Nature ==
Sahel Alma is famous for lemon fruit and its gardens are filled with lemon trees. Greengage, loquat and plums are also typically found there. During spring the scent of orange blossom is noticeable and orange blossom water as well as rose water are traditionally produced by the villagers. The water coming from the spring above the village (نبع رأس ألماء) irrigates all the planted terraces through canals that cater all the houses.

== Religion ==
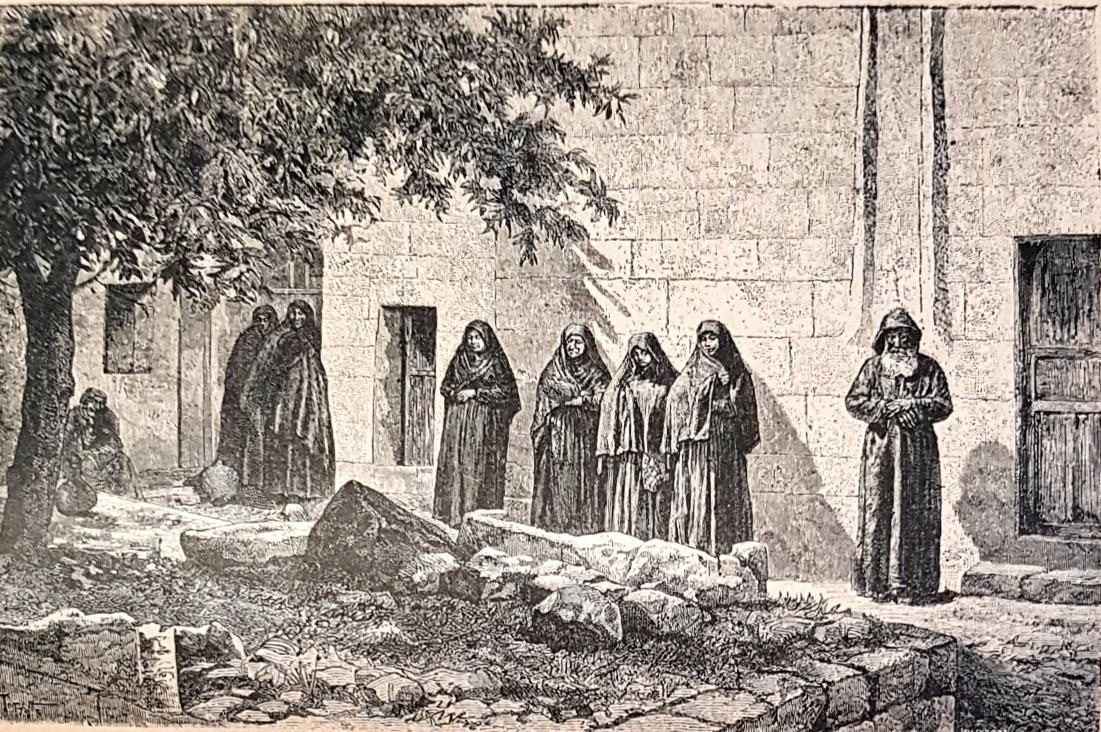
Maronite monastery in Sahel Alma, c. 19th century

The village has a Maronite population following two parishes (St Nohra and St Doumit) under the Maronite diocese of Jounieh. The parish of St Nohra holds masses in the main church of St Nohra, and occasionally in the monastery of St Georges and the monastery of Baklouch.
