= Spiny eel =

Two families of fish

The name spiny eel is used to describe members of two different families of fish: the freshwater Mastacembelidae of Asia and Africa, and the marine (and generally deep sea) Notacanthidae. Both are so-named because of their eel-like shape and sturdy fin spines. These two families are not related: the Notacanthiformes belong to the Superorder Elopomorpha, whose members are characterized by having leptocephalus larvae. The freshwater Mastacembelids do not share this characteristic and are popular specimens in the aquarium trade.

Mastacembelid Spiny eels originate from three places. The Middle East, Southeast Asia and Subsaharan Africa.

In Africa alone there are 43 species known from two genera: Aethiomastacembelus, with 19 known species, and Afromastacembelus, with 24 known species. Spiny Eels from Sri Lanka, China, Southeast Asia and India are also from two genera: Macrognathus and Mastacembelus. The most commonly found Spiny eels in the Aquarium trade are the Macrognathus and Mastacembelus from Sri Lanka, China, Southeast Asia and India. These include such eels as the Peacock and Striped Peacock, the Tire Track and or White spotted eel, the Zig Zag, Fire, Siamese, and Zebra eels.

== Sources ==
- http://www.fishinthe.net/html/section-viewarticle-54.html
