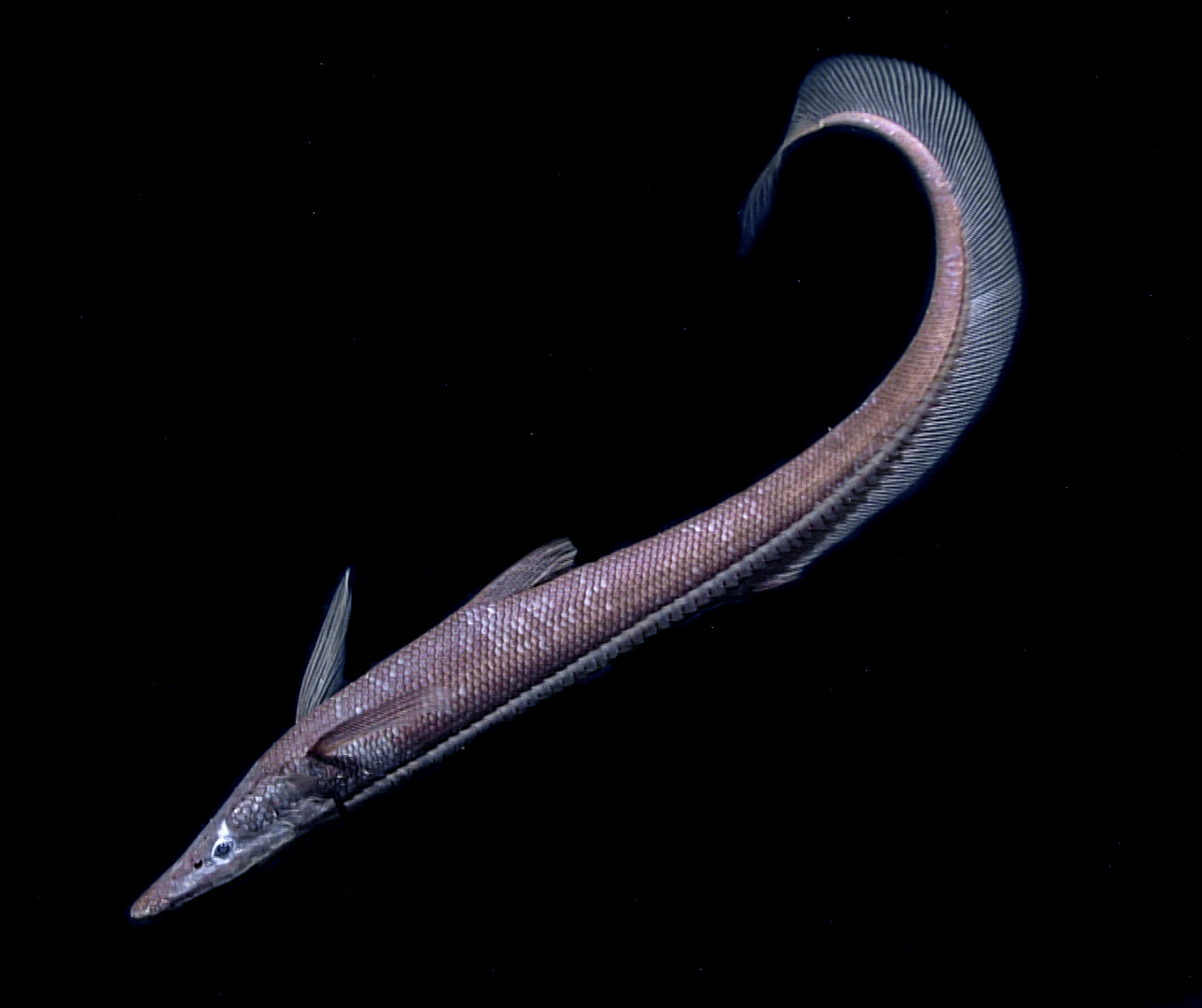

Scientific classification
- Kingdom: Animalia
- Phylum: Chordata
- Class: Actinopterygii
- Division: Teleostei
- Superorder: Elopomorpha
- Order: Notacanthiformes
- Family: Halosauridae; Günther 1868

Genera
- see text

Synonyms
- Halosauropsinae McDowall 1973

= Halosaur =

Halosaurs Temporal range: Late Campanian to present

Family of eel-like deep-sea fishes

Halosaurs are eel-shaped fishes found only at great ocean depths. As the family Halosauridae, halosaurs are one of two families within the order Notacanthiformes; the other being the deep-sea spiny eels, Notacanthidae. Halosaurs are thought to have a worldwide distribution, with some 17 species in three genera represented. Only a handful of specimens have been observed alive, all in chance encounters with remotely operated underwater vehicles.

The term "halosaur" refers to the type genus, Halosaurus, which is a Greek compound word, hals meaning "sea" and sauros meaning "lizard". Halosaurs have a spotty fossil record, the oldest known genus being Echidnocephalus from the Late Cretaceous (Campanian) strata of Westphalia, Germany, and the second-oldest known genus, Laytonia, from Miocene strata of California and Oregon. The fossil specimens already bear strong resemblance to the modern genera. The halosaurs' greatly elongated bodies end in whip-like tails; their scales are large. One small dorsal fin is close to the sharply pointed, mostly scaleless head. The tail fin is greatly reduced, with the anal fin being the largest fin. Their pectoral fins are slender and greatly elongated. Their mouths are somewhat large, with the lower jaw shorter than the upper jaw. The swim bladder is absent in all known species, except for Aldrovandia oleosa, which has a very small bladder.

The largest species, the 90-cm (3-ft) long abyssal halosaur (Halosauropsis macrochir) is also one of the most deep-living fish, recorded at depths of 3,300 m (11,000 ft). Halosaurs have developed certain adaptations to life at these extreme depths, where no light penetrates. Their lateral line system enabling the detection of vibrations in the water is highly developed; the pores run the length of the fish's body. Some species are also known to hold their elongated pectorals erect and forward, possibly providing a further means of detection.

Halosaurs are benthic fish, spending their time cruising over or resting on the sea floor, where temperatures may be just 2–4 °C. They propel themselves with rhythmic, lateral undulations of their bodies, not unlike sea snakes. Halosaurs are thought to prey mainly on benthic invertebrates, such as polychaete worms, echinoderms, and crustaceans such as copepods, but they may also consume small fishes and cephalopods.

In life, most halosaurs are grey to bluish-black in colour. Like other notacanthiform fish, halosaurs are able to regenerate their tails easily if lost. This adaptation can be likened to certain terrestrial reptiles, such as the glass lizard, which sacrifices its tail to evade predators.

== Genera ==
Halosaurs are classified into the following genera:

- Aldrovandia Goode & Bean, 1896
- Halosauropsis Collett, 1896
- Halosaurus J. Y. Johnson, 1864
- †Laytonia David, 1943
- †Echidnocephalus von der Marck, 1858

The genus Enchelurus is sometimes considered a halosaur, but has more recently been found to either be sister to the Anguilliformes and Notacanthiformes as a whole, or a stem-member of the Anguilliformes.
