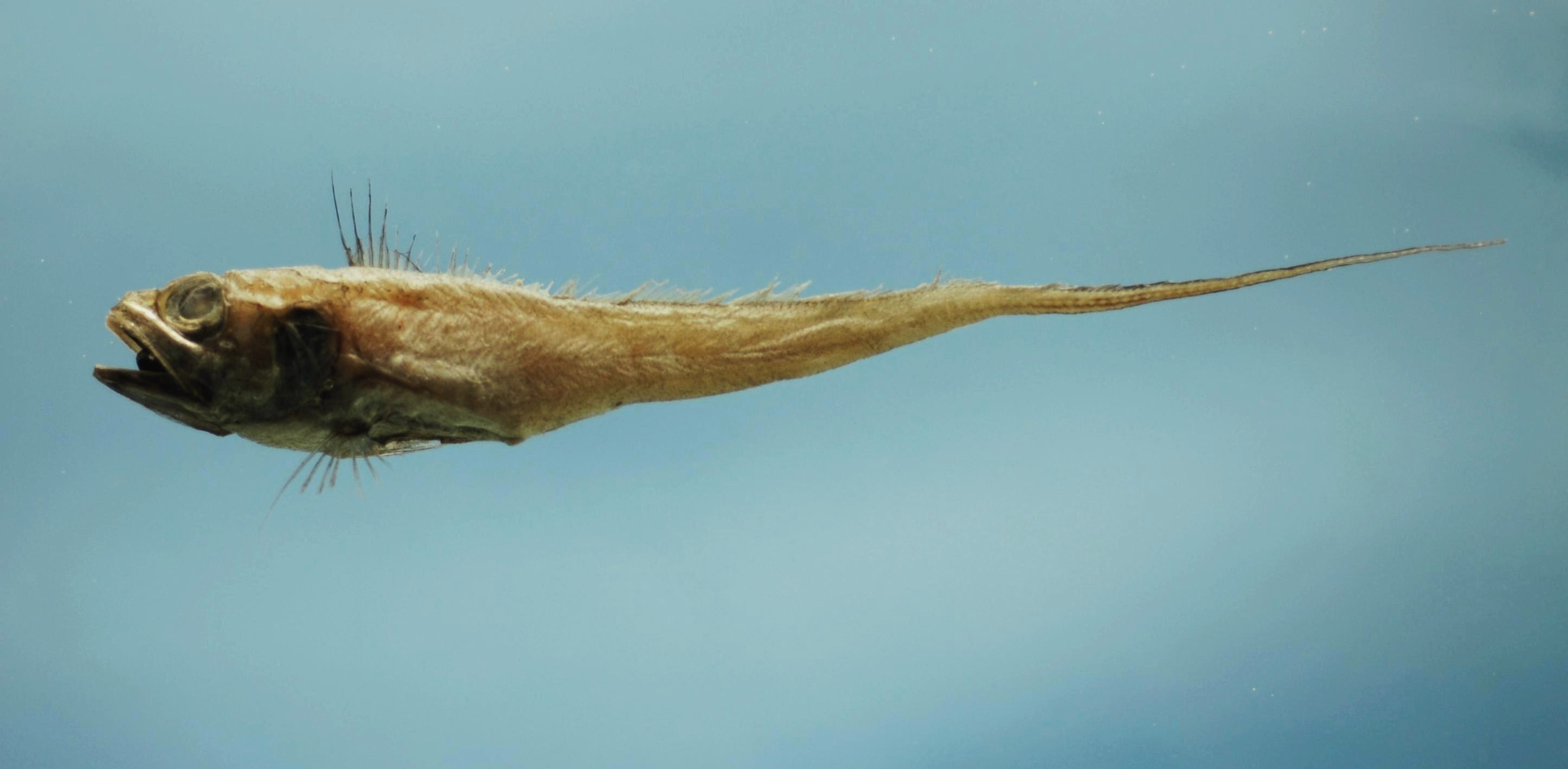
- Bathygadus melanobranchus

Scientific classification
- Kingdom: Animalia
- Phylum: Chordata
- Class: Actinopterygii
- Division: Teleostei
- Order: Gadiformes
- Suborder: Macrouroidei
- Family: Bathygadidae; Jordan & Evermann, 1898

Genera
- Bathygadus Günther, 1878; Gadomus Regan, 1903; †Bolbocara Jordan, 1927

= Bathygadidae =

Family of fishes

Bathygadidae is a family of rattails in the order Gadiformes, the species of which are found in Atlantic, Indian and Pacific Ocean. These species lives in great depths. The chin barbel is usually absent in the genus Bathygadus, when present, the barbel is tiny and difficult to see without magnification. In Gadomus the chin barbel is present, usually thick and long.

It was formerly considered a subfamily of the Macrouridae, but is now better treated as its own family.
