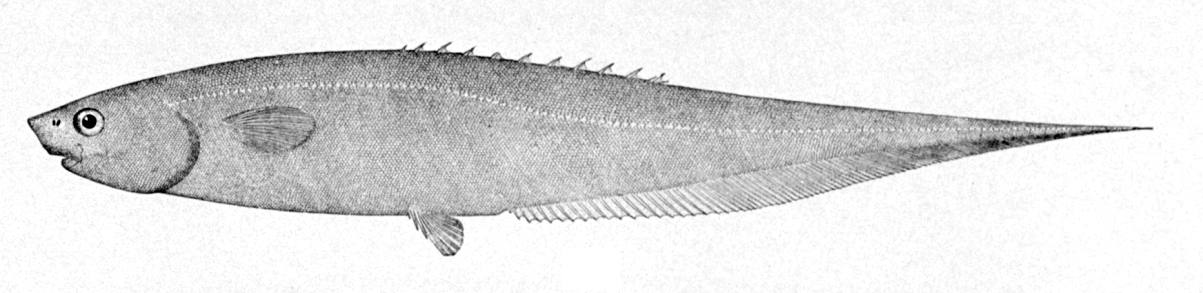
- Snubnosed spiny eel, Notacanthus chemnitzii

Scientific classification
- Kingdom: Animalia
- Phylum: Chordata
- Class: Actinopterygii
- Order: Notacanthiformes
- Family: Notacanthidae; Rafinesque, 1810

Genera
- see text

= Notacanthidae =

Notacanthidae Temporal range: Santonian–Recent

Family of fishes

Notacanthidae, the deep-sea spiny eels, are a family of fishes found worldwide below 125 m (410 ft), and as deep as 3,500 m (11,500 ft).

Their bodies are greatly elongated, though more tapered than in true eels. The caudal fin is small or nonexistent, while the anal fin is lengthy, as long as half of the total body length. They feed on animals attached to or living on the sea floor, such as sea anemones, echinoderms, molluscs, and worms.

Although not true eels, these fish do have a similar leptocephalus larval form. However, while the larvae of true eels are about 5–10% of the length of the adult, those of deep-sea spiny eels can grow considerably larger than the adult, and shrink when they develop into their final form. Thus, while adults range from 20 cm (7.9 in) to 1.2 m (3.9 ft) in length, larvae of up to 1.8 m (5.9 ft) have been recorded.

== Genera ==
Notacanthidae includes the following extant genera, although Tilurus is known only from leptocephalus larvae:

- Lipogenys Goode & T. H. Bean 1895
- Notacanthus Bloch, 1788
- Polyacanthonotus Bleeker, 1874
- Tilurus Kölliker, 1853
