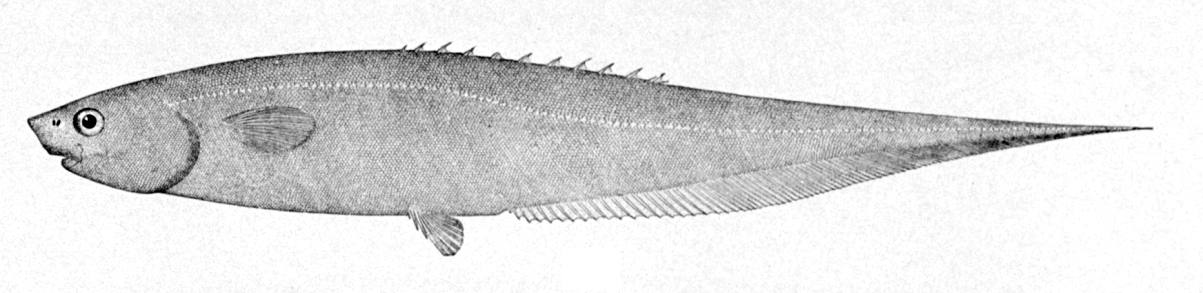
- Snub-nosed spiny eel, Notacanthus chemnitzii

Scientific classification
- Kingdom: Animalia
- Phylum: Chordata
- Class: Actinopterygii
- Infraclass: Teleosteomorpha
- Division: Teleostei
- Superorder: Elopomorpha
- Order: Notacanthiformes; L. S. Berg, 1947

Families
- see text

Synonyms
- Heteromi

= Notacanthiformes =

Notacanthiformes Temporal range: Late Cretaceous–Recent

Order of fishes

The Notacanthiformes /nɒtəˈkænθɪfɔːrmiːz/ are an order of deep-sea ray-finned fishes, consisting of the families Halosauridae and Notacanthidae (spiny eels).

Fishes of the World (2006) lists it as the suborder Notacanthoidei of Albuliformes. The notacanthiforms are much more eel-like than the albuliforms; for instance, the caudal fin has disappeared.

Fish of the order are found in oceans worldwide, at depths from 120 to 4,900 metres (390 to 16,080 ft). They are elongated fish, although not as much so as the true eels, and have various feeding strategies, like hyperbenthic and detritus feeders, epifaunal browsers, and megafaunal croppers. They typically feed on slow-moving or sessile animals, such as molluscs, echinoderms, and sea anemones. Like the true eels, they have a leptocephalus larva that floats in the surface waters before transforming into an adult. Unusually, the larva can often be larger than the adult.

== Families ==
Notacanthiformes has the following two families classified within it:

- Halosauridae Günther, 1866 (Halosaurs)
- Notacanthidae Rafinesque, 1810 (Deep-sea spiny-eels)
