= List of marine fishes of South Africa =

Fishes recorded from the oceans bordering South Africa

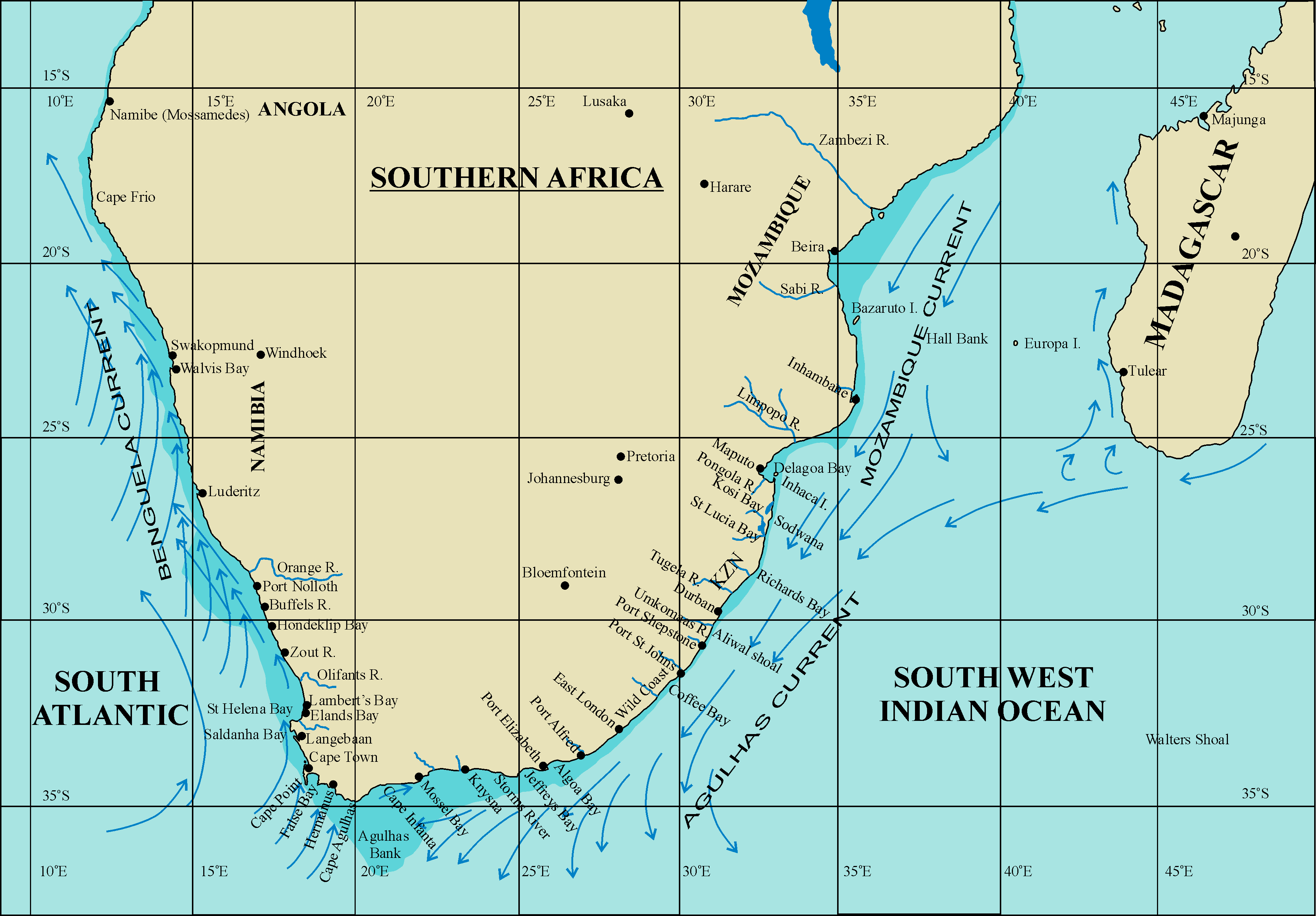
Map of the Southern African coastline showing some of the landmarks referred to in species range statements

This is a list of fishes recorded from the oceans bordering South Africa. This part of the list includes any fishes that are not bony fishes., which are the jawless and jawed cartilagenous fishes. This list comprises locally used common names, scientific names with author citation and recorded ranges. Ranges specified may not be the entire known range for the species, but should include the known range within the waters surrounding the Republic of South Africa.

List ordering and taxonomy complies where possible with the current usage in World Register of Marine Species, and may differ from the cited source, as listed citations are primarily for range or existence of records for the region. Sub-taxa within any given taxon are arranged alphabetically as a general rule. Details of each species may be available through the relevant internal links. Synonyms may be listed where useful (usually when recorded under the synonym).

A fish (pl.: fish or fishes) is an aquatic, anamniotic, gill-bearing vertebrate animal with swimming fins and a hard skull, but lacking limbs with digits. Fish can be grouped into the more basal jawless fish and the more common jawed fish, the latter including all living cartilaginous and bony fish, as well as the extinct placoderms and acanthodians. In a break to the long tradition of grouping all fish into a single class (Pisces), modern phylogenetics views fish as a paraphyletic group.

Most fish are cold-blooded, their body temperature varying with the surrounding water, though some large active swimmers like white shark and tuna can hold a higher core temperature. Many fish can communicate acoustically with each other, such as during courtship displays. The study of fish is known as ichthyology.

The earliest fish appeared during the Cambrian as small filter feeders; they continued to evolve through the Paleozoic, diversifying into many forms. The earliest fish with dedicated respiratory gills and paired fins, the ostracoderms, had heavy bony plates that served as protective exoskeletons against invertebrate predators. The first fish with jaws, the placoderms, appeared in the Silurian and greatly diversified during the Devonian, the "Age of Fishes". (Full article...)

== Infraphylum Agnatha – Jawless fishes (Cyclostomes) ==
=== Class Myxini ===
==== Order Myxiniformes – Hagfishes ====
Family: Myxinidae

- Six-gill hagfish or snotslang Eptatretus hexatrema (Müller, 1834) (Walvis Bay to Durban)
- Eightgill hagfish Eptatretus octatrema Barnard, 1923 (Agulhas bank)
- Fivegill hagfish Eptatretus profundus Barnard, 1923 (off Cape Point)
- Cape hagfish Myxine capensis Regan, 1913 (Cape of Good Hope)

== Infraphylum Gnathostomata – Jawed fishes ==
=== Parvphylum Chondrichthyes – Cartilaginous fishes ===
==== Class Elasmobranchii – Sharks and Rays ====
===== Infraclass Batoidea – Rays (including skates, guitarfish and sawfish) =====
====== Order Myliobatiformes – Stingrays ======
Family: Dasyatidae – Whiptail stingrays

- Short-tail stingray, Dasyatis brevicaudata (Hutton, 1875) (False Bay to Delagoa Bay)
- Blue stingray Dasyatis chrysonota (Smith, 1828) (Central Angola to Delagoa Bay) (syn. Dasyatis marmoratis)
- Thorntail stingray, Dasyatis thetidis Ogilby, 1899 (Algoa Bay to Mozambique)
- Pelagic stingray, Dasyatis violacea (Bonaparte, 1832) (offshore, two records from SA)
- Dragon stingray, Jenkins' whipray, Himantura draco Compagno and Heemstra, 1984 (off Durban)
- Sharpnose stingray, whitespotted whipray Himantura gerrardi (Gray, 1851) (Eastern Cape to Mozambique)
- Honeycomb stingray, reticulate whipray, Himantura uarnak (Forsskål, 1775) (Port Alfred to Mozambique)
- Roundnose stingray Himantura sp. (Durban bay)
- Bluespotted stingray, Kuhl's maskray, Neotrygon kuhlii (Müller & Henle, 1841) (Durban to tropical Indo-West Pacific)(Syn. Dasyatis kuhlii)
- Feathertail stingray, Cowtail stingray, Pastinachus sephen (Forsskål, 1775) (Zululand) (syn. Hypolophus sephen, Dasyatis sephen)
- Bluespotted ribbontail ray Taeniura lymma (Forsskål, 1775)
- Round ribbontail ray or giant reef rayTaeniura meyeni Müller & Henle, 1841 (Natal to Red Sea) (syn. Taeniura melanospilos Bleeker, 1853)
- Porcupine ray, Urogymnus asperrimus (Bloch and Schneider, 1801) (Natal to Indo-West Pacific)

Family: Gymnuridae – Butterflyrays

- Japanese butterfly ray, Gymnura japonica (Temminck and Schlegel, 1850) (Agulhas bank) (Identification provisional)
- Backwater butterfly ray, Gymnura natalensis (Gilchrist and Thompson, 1911) (Mossel Bay to southern Mozambique)

Family: Hexatrygonidae – Sixgill stingrays

- Sixgill stingray, Hexatrygon bickelli Heemstra and Smith, 1980 (Port Elizabeth and Port Alfred)

Family: Myliobatidae – Eagle rays

- Spotted eagle ray, Aetobatus narinari (Euphrasen, 1790) (Mossel Bay to Mozambique)
- Bull ray, Aetomylaeus bovinus (Geoffroy Saint-Hilaire, 1817), also reported as syn. Pteromylaeus bovinus (Saint-Hilaire, 1817) (South-western Cape to Zanzibar)
- Manta, giant oceanic manta ray, Mobula birostris (Walbaum, 1792), also reported as syn. Manta birostris (Donndorff, 1798) (possibly circumtropical, from the Cape eastwards)
- Longhorned mobula, Mobula eregoodootenkee (Cuvier, 1829) (Indo-West Pacific south to Natal)
- Spinetail mobula, devil fish, Mobula mobular (Bonnaterre, 1788), also recorded as syn. Mobula japanica (Müller & Henle, 1841) (Natal)
- Shortfin devil ray Mobula kuhlii (Valenciennes, 1841) (Port Alfred to Indo-West Pacific)
- Spiny mobula, Chilean devil ray, Mobula tarapacana (Lloyd, 1908) (Reported from Natal and Jeffrey's Bay)
- Smoothtail mobula, bentfin devil ray, Mobula thurstoni (Lloyd, 1908) (Reported from Natal and Algoa Bay)
- Common eagle ray, Myliobatis aquila (Linnaeus, 1758) (Namibia to KwaZulu-Natal)
- Flapnose ray, Rhinoptera javanica Muller and Henle, 1841 (Durban and north)

====== Order Rajiformes – Rays, skates and guitarfish ======
Family Anacanthobatidae

- Spotted legskate, Anacanthobatis marmorata von Bonde and Swart, 1923 (Durban to southern Mozambique)

Family Arhynchobatidae

- Bathyraja smithii (Müller & Henle, 1841) (Agulhas bank and west of Cape Town)

Family Gurgesiellidae

- Cruriraja durbanensis (von Bonde and Swart, 1923) (off Western Cape province)
- Cruriraja parcomaculata von Bonde and Swart, 1923 (Lüderitz to Durban) also recorded as syn. Cruriraja triangularis Smith, 1964 (Durban to Mozambique)

Family: Rajidae – Skates

- Arctic skate, Amblyraja hyperborea (Collett, 1879) recorded as syn. Raja robertsi Hulley, 1970 (west of Cape Town)
- Slimeskate, Dipturus pullopunctatus (Smith, 1964) also recorded as syn. Raja pullopunctata Smith, 1964 (Luderitz to Mozambique)
- Dipturus springeri (Wallace, 1967) reported as syn. Raja springeri Wallace, 1967 (Durban to Mozambique)
- Blancmange skate, Leucoraja wallacei (Hulley, 1970)recorded as syn. Raja Wallacei Hulley, 1970 (Cape to Limpopo river mouth)
- Malacoraja spinacidermis (Barnard, 1923) recorded as syn. Raja spinacidermis Barnard, 1923, (off west coast)
- African dwarf skate, Neoraja stehmanni (Hulley, 1972) (West of Cape Town to south of Agulha Bank)
- Thornback skate Raja clavata Linnaeus, 1758, (Walvis Bay to Durban)
- Twineye skate, Raja miraletus Linnaeus, 1758, (False Bay to Durban)
- Biscuit skate or false thornback skate, Raja straeleni Poll, 1951, (West Africa to East London)
- Bigthorn skate, Rajella barnardi (Norman, 1935), also reported as syn. Raja confundens Hulley, 1970 (West coast from 19°S to east of Cape Point)
- Munchkin skate, Rajella caudaspinosa (von Bonde & Swart, 1923), also recorded as syn. Raja caudaspinosa von Bonde and Swart, 1923 (Luderitz to Cape Point)
- Ghost skate, Rajella dissimilis (Hulley, 1970) also recorded as syn. Raja dissimilis Hulley, 1970 (west of Cape Town)
- Leopard skate, Rajella leoparda also reported as syn. Raja leopardus von Bonde and Swart, 1923, (west coast from 18°S to 35°S)
- Smoothback skate, Rajella ravidula (Hulley, 1970), recorded as Raja ravidula Hulley, 1970 (off Cape Town)
- Spearnose skate, bottlenose skate, Rostroraja alba (Lacepède, 1803) (West Africa to Madagascar) (syn. Raja alba)

====== Order Rhinopristiformes ======
Family: Pristidae – Sawfishes

- Largetooth sawfish, Pristis microdon Latham, 1794 (Natal to tropical Indo-West Pacific)
- Smalltooth sawfish, Pristis pectinata Latham, 1794 (Port Alfred to Mozambique)
- Longcomb sawfish, Pristis zijsron Bleeker, 1851 (Port Alfred to Indo-West Pacific)

Family: Rhinobatidae – Guitarfish

- Lesser sandshark or lesser guitarfish, Acroteriobatus annulatus (Müller & Henle, 1841), recorded as syn. Rhinobatos annulatus Smith in Müller & Henle, 1841 (Cape Columbine to Mozambique)
- Greyspotted guitarfish, Acroteriobatus leucospilus (Norman, 1926), recorded as syn. Rhinobatos leucospilus Norman, 1926 (Durban to Amatikulu Bluff)
- Speckled guitarfish, Acroteriobatus ocellatus (Norman, 1926), recorded as syn. Rhinobatos ocellatus Norman, 1926 (Algoa Bay)
- Bowmouth guitarfish, Rhina ancylostomus Bloch & Schneider, 1801 (KwaZulu-Natal to tropical Ind-West Pacific)
- Bluntnose guitarfish, Rhinobatos blochii Müller & Henle, 1841 (Cape to Walvis Bay)
- Slender guitarfish, Rhinobatos holcorhynchus Norman, 1922 (Port Shepstone to Zululand)
- Giant sandshark, giant guitarfish, Rhynchobatus djiddensis (Forsskål, 1775) (Knysna to Mozambique)

====== Order Torpediniformes – Electric rays ======
Family: Narkidae

- Ornate torpedo ray, ornate sleeper-ray, Electrolux addisoni Compagno & Heemstra, 2007 (Coffee Bay, Eastern Cape Province, to just north of Durban, kwaZulu-Natal)
- Natal electric ray, Heteronarce garmani Regan, 1921 (Algoa Bay to KwaZulu-Natal)
- Onefin electric ray or Torpedo ray Narke capensis (Gmelin, 1789) (Atlantic coast of Cape Peninsula to Madagascar)

Family: Torpedinidae

- Atlantic electric ray, Atlantic torpedo, Tetronarce nobiliana (Bonaparte, 1835), recorded as syn. Torpedo nobiliana Bonaparte, 1835, (Western Cape coast to Algoa Bay)
- Blackspotted electric ray, blackspotted torpedo, Torpedo fuscomaculata Peters, 1855 (Cape Columbine to Mozambique)
- Marbled electrical ray, gulf torpedo, Torpedo sinuspersici Olfers, 1831, (Eastern Cape to Mozambique)

===== Infraclass Selachii – Sharks =====
====== Order Carcharhiniformes – Ground sharks ======
Family: Carcharhinidae – Requiem sharks

- Silvertip shark Carcharhinus albimarginatus (Rüppell, 1837) (North of Cape Vidal)
- Bignose shark Carcharhinus altimus (Springer, 1950) (Eastern Cape and KwaZulu-Natal)
- Shortnose blacktail reef shark or grey reef shark Carcharhinus amblyrhynchos (Bleeker, 1856) (Northern KwaZulu-Natal to Red Sea) also recorded as syn. Carcharhinus wheeleri (Garrick, 1982)
- Java shark, pigeye shark, Carcharhinus amboinensis (Müller and Henle, 1839) (Eastern Cape and Natal)
- Copper shark, bronze whaler, Carcharhinus brachyurus (Günther, 1870) (Namibia to Durban)
- Spinner shark, Carcharhinus brevipinna (Müller and Henle, 1838) (Mossel Bay to Red sea)
- Silky shark, Carcharhinus falciformis (Bibron, 1839) (Durban to Zanzibar)
- Zambezi or Bull shark, Carcharhinus leucas (Valenciennes in Müller & Henle, 1839) (Port Elizabeth to Mozambique)
- Blacktip shark, Carcharhinus limbatus (Müller and Henle, 1839) (Southern Cape to Madagascar)
- Oceanic whitetip shark Carcharhinus longimanus (Poey, 1861) (South-eastern Cape and Natal)
- Dusky shark Carcharhinus obscurus (Lesueur, 1818) (Cape Point to Mozambique)
- Sandbar shark, Carcharhinus plumbeus (Nardo, 1827) (Algoa Bay to Madagascar)
- Blackspot shark, Carcharhinus sealei (Pietschmann, 1913) (Natal to Zanzibar)
- Spot-tail shark, Carcharhinus sorrah (Valenciennes, 1839) (Northern Natal to Red Sea)
- Tiger shark, Galeocerdo cuvier (Péron & Lesueur, 1822) (Port Elizabeth to Mozambique)
- Sliteye shark, Loxodon macrorhinus Müller and Henle, 1839, (Natal to Tropical Indo-West Pacific)
- Sicklefin lemon shark, Negaprion acutidens (Rüppell, 1837) (Natal and Indo-Pacific)
- Blue shark, Prionace glauca (Linnaeus, 1758) (off south-western Cape coast)
- Milk shark, Rhizoprionodon acutus (Rüppell, 1837) (Southern KwaZulu-Natal to Indo-West Pacific)
- Whitetip reef shark Triaenodon obesus (Rüppell, 1837) (Southern KwaZulu-Natal to Mozambique)

Family: Hemigaleidae

- Snaggletooth shark, Hemipristis elongata (Klunzinger, 1871) (Natal and Indo-West Pacific)
- Whitetip weasel shark, Paragaleus leucolomatus Compagno and Smale, 1985 (Kosi Bay)

Family: Pentanchidae

- Smalleye catshark, Apristurus microps (Gilchrist, 1922) (Western Cape to Agulhas)
- Saldanha catshark, Apristurus saldanha (Barnard 1925) (Saldanha bay)
- Lined catshark or Banded catshark Halaelurus lineatus Bass, D'Aubrey & Kistnasamy, 1975 (KwaZulu-Natal to Mozambique)
- Tiger catshark Halaelurus natalensis (Regan, 1904)
- Spotted catshark, white-spotted Izak, Holohalaelurus punctatus (Gilchrist, 1914) (Natal to Mozambique)
- Izak catshark, Holohalaelurus regani (Gilchrist, 1922) (South-western Cape to Zanzibar)

Family: Proscylliidae

- African ribbontail catshark, Eridacnis sinuans (Smith, 1927) (Natal to Tanzania)

Family: Scyliorhinidae – Catsharks

- Swell shark, balloon shark, Cephaloscyllium sufflans (Regan, 1921) (Central KwaZulu-Natal to Gulf of Aden)
- Puffadder shyshark or Happy Eddie Haploblepharus edwardsii (Schinz, 1822) (Cape Point to central KwaZulu-Natal)
- Brown shyshark Haploblepharus fuscus Smith, 1950 (Cape Agulhas to southern KwaZulu-Natal)
- Dark shyshark, dusky shyshark or skaamoog Haploblepharus pictus (Müller & Henle, 1838) (Namibia to Cape Agulhas)
- Pyjama shark or striped catshark Poroderma africanum (Gmelin, 1789) (Cape Columbine to central KwaZulu-Natal)
- Leopard catshark Poroderma pantherinum (Müller & Henle, 1838) (Cape Columbine to Durban) also recorded as syn. blackspotted catshark Poroderma marleyi Fowler, 1933 (Port St. Johns to Natal)
- Yellowspotted catshark, Scyliorhinus capensis (Müller & Henle, 1838), (South-western Cape to KwaZulu-Natal)

Family: Sphyrnidae – Hammerhead sharks

- Scalloped hammerhead shark, Sphyrna lewini (Griffith & Smith, 1834) (East London to Mozambique)
- Great hammerhead Sphyrna mokarran (Rüppell, 1837) (Natal to tropical Indo-Pacific)
- Smooth hammerhead Sphyrna zygaena (Linnaeus, 1758) (South Cape to southern Mozambique, occasionally on west coast. Warm temperate waters of both hemispheres)

Family: Triakidae – Houndsharks

- Soupfin shark, school shark, Galeorhinus galeus (Linnaeus, 1758) (Angola to East London)
- Lesser soupfin shark, blacktip tope, Hypogaleus hyugaensis (Miyosi, 1939) (Natal to Zanzibar)
- Hardnosed smooth-hound, Arabian smooth-hound, Mustelus mosis Hemprich and Ehrenberg, 1899 (Durban to Red Sea)
- Common smooth-hound shark Mustelus mustelus (Linnaeus, 1758) (Namibia to KwaZulu-Natal)
- Whitespotted smooth-hound Mustelus palumbes Smith, 1957 (Walvis bay to Algoa bay)
- Flapnose houndshark, Scylliogaleus quecketti Boulenger, 1902 (north-eastern Cape to Natal)
- Spotted gully shark, sharptooth houndshark, Triakis megalopterus (Smith, 1839) (Walvis Bay to East London)

====== Order Echinorhiniformes ======
Family: Echinorhinidae – Bramble sharks

- Bramble shark Echinorhinus brucus (Bonnaterre, 1788) (Namibia to southern KwaZulu-Natal)

====== Order Hexanchiformes – Cow and frill sharks ======
Family: Hexanchidae – Cow sharks

- Sharpnose sevengill shark, Heptranchias perlo Bonnaterre, 1788 (KwaZulu-Natal)
- Bluntnose sixgill shark, Hexanchus griseus (Bonnaterre, 1788) (All oceans)
- Bigeye sixgill shark, Atlantic sixgill shark, Hexanchus nakamurai Teng, 1962, recorded as syn. Hexanchus vitulus Springer and Waller, 1969 (Atlantic, south-west Indian Ocean)
- Spotted sevengill cowshark or broadnose sevengill shark, Notorynchus cepedianus (Péron, 1807) (Namibia to East London)

====== Order Lamniformes – Mackerel sharks ======
Family: Alopiidae – Thresher sharks

- Smalltooth thresher, pelagic thresher, Alopias pelagicus Nakamura, 1935 (Durban to northwest Indian Ocean)
- Bigeye thresher, Alopias superciliosus (Lowe, 1840) (Eastern Cape and Natal, Warm oceanic waters)
- Thintail thresher, common thresher Alopias vulpinus (Bonnaterre, 1788) (throughout SA waters, more common in southern part)

Family: Cetorhinidae – Basking sharks

- Basking shark, Cetorhinus maximus (Gunnerus, 1765) (Temperate waters of all oceans, a few records from south-western Cape)

Family: Lamnidae – Mackerel sharks

- Great white shark, Carcharodon carcharias (Linnaeus, 1758) (Namibia to Mozambique)
- Shortfin mako shark, Isurus oxyrinchus Rafinesque, 1810, (Warm temperate and tropical waters of all oceans)
- Porbeagle, Lamna nasus (Bonnaterre, 1788) (Temperate oceans, recorded from False Bay and possibly Knysna)

Family: Mitsukurinidae – Goblin sharks

- Goblin shark, Mitsukurina owstoni Jordan, 1898 (west of Cape Town and off Transkei coast)

Family: Odontaspididae

- Ragged-tooth shark, spotted ragged-tooth shark, or sand tiger shark, Carcharias taurus Rafinesque, 1810, also recorded as syn. Eugomphodus taurus, (Cape Point to Mozambique)
- Bumpytail ragged-tooth shark, smalltooth sand tiger, Odontaspis ferox (Risso, 1810) (Natal)

Family: Pseudocarchariidae – Crocodile sharks

- Crocodile shark Pseudocarcharias kamoharai (Matsubara, 1936) (once found near Cape Town)

====== Order Orectolobiformes – Carpet sharks ======
Family: Ginglymostomatidae

- Giant sleepy shark, tawny nurse shark, Nebrius ferrugineus (Lesson, 1831), recorded as syn. Nebrius concolor Ruppell, 1837 (Natal to Indo-West Pacific)

Family: Rhincodontidae – Whale sharks

- Whale shark, Rhincodon typus Smith, 1828 (Northern Natal)

Family: Stegostomatidae

- Zebra shark, Stegostoma tigrinum (Forster, 1781), recorded as syn. Stegostoma fasciatum (Hermann, 1783) (KwaZulu-Natal to Mozambique)

====== Order Pristiophoriformes – Sawsharks ======
Family: Pristiophoridae

- Sixgill sawshark, Pliotrema warreni Regan, 1906 (False Bay to southern Mozambique)

====== Order Squaliformes – Dogfish sharks ======
Family: Centrophoridae

- Gulper shark, Centrophorus granulosus (Bloch and Schneider, 1801) (Western Cape)
- Smallfin gulper shark, Centrophorus lusitanicus Barbosa du Bocage & de Brito Capello, 1864 (Natal)
- Smallfin gulper shark, Centrophorus moluccensis Bleeker, 1860, recorded as syn. Centrophorus scalpratus McCulloch, 1915 (Natal to southern Mozambique)
- Leafscale gulper shark, Centrophorus squamosus Bonnaterre, 1788 (Western Cape and Algoa Bay)
- Birdbeak dogfish, Deania calceus (Lowe, 1839), (Cape Point and Algoa Bay)
- Arrowhead dogfish, Deania profundorum (Smith and Radcliffe, 1912) (West coast and Natal)
- Longsnout dogfish, Deania quadrispinosa (McCulloch, 1915) (Northern Namibia to Southern Mozambique)

Family: Dalatiidae

- Kitefin shark, seal shark, Dalatias licha (Bonnaterre, 1788), recorded as syn. Scymnorhinus licha (Bonnaterre, 1788) (Algoa bay to Mozambique)

Family: Somniosidae

- Velvet dogfish, Zameus squamulosus (Günther, 1877), recorded as syn. Centroscymnus obscurus Vaillant, 1888, (off Durban)

Family: Squalidae – Dogfishes

- Black dogfish, Centroscyllium fabricii (Reinhardt, 1825) (Western Cape)
- Longnose velvet dogfish, Centroscymnus crepidater (Bocage and Capello, 1864) (Western Cape)
- Short-tail lanternshark, Etmopterus brachyurus Smith and Radcliffe, 1912 (Western Cape, Natal and southern Mozambique)
- Southern lanternshark, Etmopterus granulosus (Günther, 1880) (Cape Point)
- Blackbelly lanternshark, Etmopterus lucifer Jordan and Snyder, 1902 (off Natal)
- Smooth lanternshark, Etmopterus pusillus (Lowe, 1839) (off Natal)
- Thorny lanternshark, Etmopterus sentosus Bass, D'Aubrey and Kistnasamy, 1973 (off Natal)
- Etmopterus sp. (off south-western Cape Province, northern KwaZulu-Natal)
- Taillight shark, Euprotomicroides zantedeschia Hulley and Penrith, 1966 (West of Cape Town)
- Pygmy shark, Euprotomicrus bispinatus (Quoy and Gaimard, 1824) (all oceans)
- Longnose pygmy shark, Heteroscymnoides marleyi Fowler, 1934 (Durban)
- Flatiron shark, Angular roughshark, Oxynotus centrina (Linnaeus, 1758) (Walvis Bay to Cape Town)
- Greenland shark, Somniosus microcephalus (Schneider, 1801) (off Cape Columbine)
- Spotted spiny dogfish, Squalus acanthias Linnaeus, 1758 (South-western Cape to Port Elizabeth)
- Roughskin spiny dogfish, roughskin spurdog, Squalus asper Merrett, 1973 (Natal to north of Madagascar)
- Bluntnose spiny dogfish, shortnose spurdog, Squalus megalops (MacLeay, 1882) (Namibia to southern Mozambique)
- Longnose spiny dogfish, shortspine spurdog, Squalus mitsukurii Jordan and Fowler, 1903 (Orange river to Beira)

====== Order Squatiniformes – Angelsharks ======
Family: Squatinidae

- African angelshark, Squatina africana Regan, 1908 (Eastern Cape and Natal)

==== Subclass Holocephali – Chimaeras ====
===== Order Chimaeriformes =====
Family: Callorhinchidae – Elephantfish

- St Joseph shark or Cape elephantfish, Callorhinchus capensis Duméril, 1865 (Namibia to central KwaZulu-Natal)

Family: Chimaeridae – Chimaeras

- Cape chimaera Chimaera notafricana (Luderitz to Cape Point)
- African chimaera, Hydrolagus africanus (Gilchrist 1922) (Natal)
- Hydrolagus sp. (off Durban)

Family: Rhinochimaeridae – Longnose chimaeras

- Narrownose chimaera, Harriotta raleighana Goode and Bean, 1895 (off Western Cape)
- Paddlenose chimaera, Rhinochimaera africana Compagno, Stehman and Ebert, 1990 (west coast off Doring Bay and Cape Columbine, Natal coast off Kosi Bay)
- Broadnose chimaera, Rhinochimaera atlantica Holt and Byrne, 1909 (Namibia to Plettenberg Bay)

== Parvphylum Osteichthyes – Bony fishes ==
See article List of marine bony fishes of South Africa
