= Round skate =

A round skate is a common name that is used for several different species of rays:

- The round skate, Rajella fyllae
- The Indonesian round skate, Rajella annandalei
- The Australian round skates, Irolita
  - The southern round skate, Irolita waitii
  - The western round skate, Irolita westraliensis
- The thornback guitarfish, Platyrhinoidis triseriata
