= H. africanus =

H. africanus may refer to:

- Holodactylus africanus, a gecko species found in Eastern Africa
- Hydrolagus africanus, the African chimaera, a fish species found in Kenya, Mozambique and Namibia

== Synonyms ==
- Hibiscus africanus, a synonym for Hibiscus trionum, a plant species

== See also ==
- Africanus (disambiguation)
