= Spotted legskate =

Conservation status
- Near Threatened (IUCN 3.1)

Scientific classification
- Kingdom: Animalia
- Phylum: Chordata
- Class: Chondrichthyes
- Subclass: Elasmobranchii
- Order: Rajiformes
- Family: Anacanthobatidae
- Genus: Anacanthobatis
- Species: A. marmorata

Binomial name
- Anacanthobatis marmorata (von Bonde & Swart, 1923)

Synonyms
- Leiobatis dubius von Bonde & Swart, 1923; Anacanthobatis dubius (von Bonde & Swart, 1923); Springeria dubia (von Bonde & Swart, 1923)

Species of fish

The spotted legskate (Anacanthobatis marmorata) is a species of cartilaginous fish, a ray belonging to the family Anacanthobatidae, the smooth skates. It is the only species in the monospecific genus Anacanthobatis. It is found off Mozambique and South Africa. This is a demersal fish occurring on soft substrates on the continental shelf break and upper continental slope at depths of 200–435 m (656–1,427 ft).

== Classification ==
The spotted legskate is the only species in its genus, previously several species have been assigned to this genus, but most are now placed in Sinobatis, Springeria, and Schroederobatis, leaving only A. marmoratus in Anacanthobatis.
