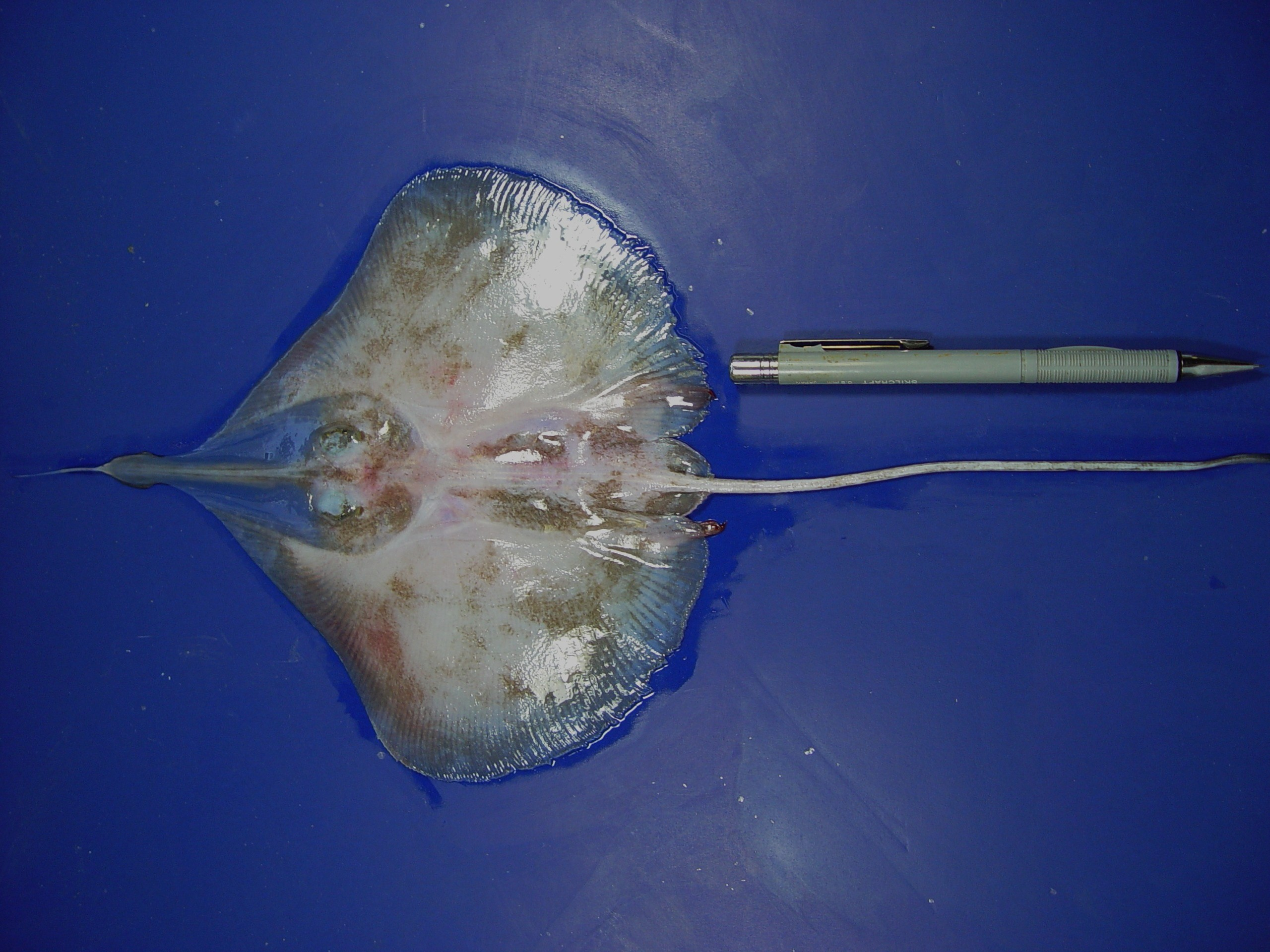

Conservation status
- Least Concern (IUCN 3.1)

Scientific classification
- Kingdom: Animalia
- Phylum: Chordata
- Class: Chondrichthyes
- Subclass: Elasmobranchii
- Order: Rajiformes
- Family: Anacanthobatidae
- Genus: Springeria
- Species: S. folirostris

Binomial name
- Springeria folirostris Bigelow & Schroeder, 1951

Synonyms
- Anacanthobatis folirostris (Bigelow & Schroeder, 1951)

= Springeria folirostris =

Species of cartilaginous fish

Springeria folirostris, the leaf-nosed legskate, is a species of marine cartilaginous fish, a ray, belonging to the family Anacanthobatidae, the smooth skates. This species is known only from the northern Gulf of Mexico.
