= Bigelow's ray =

Conservation status
- Least Concern (IUCN 3.1)

Scientific classification
- Kingdom: Animalia
- Phylum: Chordata
- Class: Chondrichthyes
- Subclass: Elasmobranchii
- Order: Rajiformes
- Family: Rajidae
- Genus: Rajella
- Species: R. bigelowi

Binomial name
- Rajella bigelowi (Stehmann, 1978)

Synonyms
- Raja (Rajella) bigelowi Stehmann, 1978; Raja bigelowi Stehmann, 1978

Species of cartilaginous fish

Bigelow's ray (Rajella bigelowi), also called the chocolate skate or Bigelow's skate, is a species of cartligainous fish belonging to the family Rajidae, the hardnose skates. This species is found in the Western Atlantic Ocean.

== Taxonomy ==
Bigelow's ray was first formally described as Raja (Rajella) bigelowi in 1978 by the German ichthyologist Matthias Stehmann with its type locality given as the Northwestern Atlantic at 37°05'N, 74°20.6'W from the Columbus Iselin station 91 at a depth of 1,719 m (5,640 ft). Stehmann originally proposed Rajella as a subgenus of Raja, with Raja fyllae as its type species, but Rajella is now recognised as a valid genus within the family Rajidae. The family Rajidae is included in the order Rajiformes, the skates.

== Etymology ==
Bigelow's ray is classified in the genus Rajella, a name which is a diminutive of Raja, the genus it was originally proposed to be a subgenus of, given because of the relatively small size of its type species. The specific name honours the American oceanographer and marine biologist Henry B. Bigelow of the Woods Hole Oceanographic Institution in recognition for his work on cartilaginous fishes.

== Description ==
Like all rays, Bigelow's ray has a flattened body with broad, wing-like pectoral fins. The body is sub-rhomboid. It is dark on the dorsal surface, with the outer edges of the disc and pelvic fins shading to a slightly darker colour. The dorsal fins are confluent. The upper and lower jaws have 33-44 rows. The snout has is bluntly angled and is short. Adult males have both alar and malar thorns.

Its maximum length is 55 cm (1.80 ft).

== Distribution and habitat ==
Bigelow's ray has a disjunct distribution in the northern Atlantic. In the Western Atlanticit occurs from the Gulf of Mexico north ro New England and on the Scotian Shelf Grand Banks and Labrador Shelf of Canada, and the French territory of Saint Pierre and Miquelon, and Greenland. In the Eastern Atlantic it is found from the Mid-Atlantic Ridge and the Rockall Trough to the Bay of Biscay and along the African coast at northern Morocco, the Azores, Western Sahara and Guinea Conakry. Bigelow's ray lives on continental slopes and deepwater and has been recorded at 367–4,156 m (1,204–13,635 ft), mostly below 1,500 m (4,900 ft). It occurs in water temperatures between 3.5–4 °C (38.3–39.2 °F).

== Behaviour ==
Bigelow's ray feeds on small benthic crustaceans.

== Life cycle ==
Bigelow's ray is oviparous. The eggs are oblong capsules with stiff pointed horns at the corners; they are deposited in sandy or muddy flats. Egg cases measure 5.3 centimetres (2.1 in) long and 3 centimetres (1.2 in).

It is parasitised by Ditrachybothridium macrocephalum (tapeworms of the order Diphyllidea).

== See also ==
- Fish of the Atlantic Ocean
