= S. africana =

S. africana may refer to:

- Sasia africana, the African piculet, a bird species
- Sparrmannia africana, the African hemp, a plant species
- Spirostachys africana, a tree species
- Squatina africana, the African angelshark, a shark species

== See also ==
- Africana (disambiguation)
