= E. africana =

E. africana may refer to:

- Epimyrma africana, an ant species endemic to Algeria
- Etmopterus africana, the shorttail lanternshark, a shark species found in the western Pacific

== See also ==
- Africana (disambiguation)
