= Deepwater ray =

Conservation status
- Least Concern (IUCN 3.1)

Scientific classification
- Kingdom: Animalia
- Phylum: Chordata
- Class: Chondrichthyes
- Subclass: Elasmobranchii
- Order: Rajiformes
- Family: Rajidae
- Genus: Rajella
- Species: R. bathyphila

Binomial name
- Rajella bathyphila (Holt & Byrne, 1908)

Synonyms
- Raja bathyphila (Holt & Byrne, 1908); Raja bathyphilla (Holt & Byrne, 1908)

Species of cartilaginous fish

The deepwater ray (Rajella bathyphila), also called the deepwater skate or abyssal skate, is a species of skate in the family Rajidae.

== Distribution ==
The deepwater ray is bathydemersal; it has been recorded at 600–2,300 m (2,000–7,500 ft), mostly below 1,300–1,400 m (4,300–4,600 ft). It has been found in seas worldwide, concentrated in the North Atlantic, living on continental slopes and abyssal plains. They ccur in water temperatures between 2.5–4 °C (36.5–39.2 °F).

== Description ==
Like all rays, the deepwater ray has a flattened body with broad, wing-like pectoral fins. The dorsal surface of adults is white. The outer edges of pectoral and pelvic fins shade to darker. The upper surface is spinulose, but there are bare patches in the centre of the pectoral fins and on sides of body in adult males. The dorsal fins are confluent.

Its maximum length is 90 cm (3.0 ft).

== Behaviour ==
Juveniles feed on small benthic invertebrates, while larger deepwater rays feed on larger invertebrates and fish. It is parasitised by Echeneibothrium bathyphilum, a cestode tapeworm of the order Rhinebothriidea.

== Life cycle ==
The deepwater ray is oviparous. The eggs have horn-like projections on the egg case. Egg cases measure 8–9 centimetres (3.1–3.5 in) in length and 4–6 centimetres (1.6–2.4 in) in width. Females lay around 40 egg cases annually. Total length of deepwater rays at maturity is around 65–75 centimetres (26–30 in) Paired eggs are laid, with embryos feeding solely on yolk.

== See also ==
- Fish of the Atlantic Ocean
