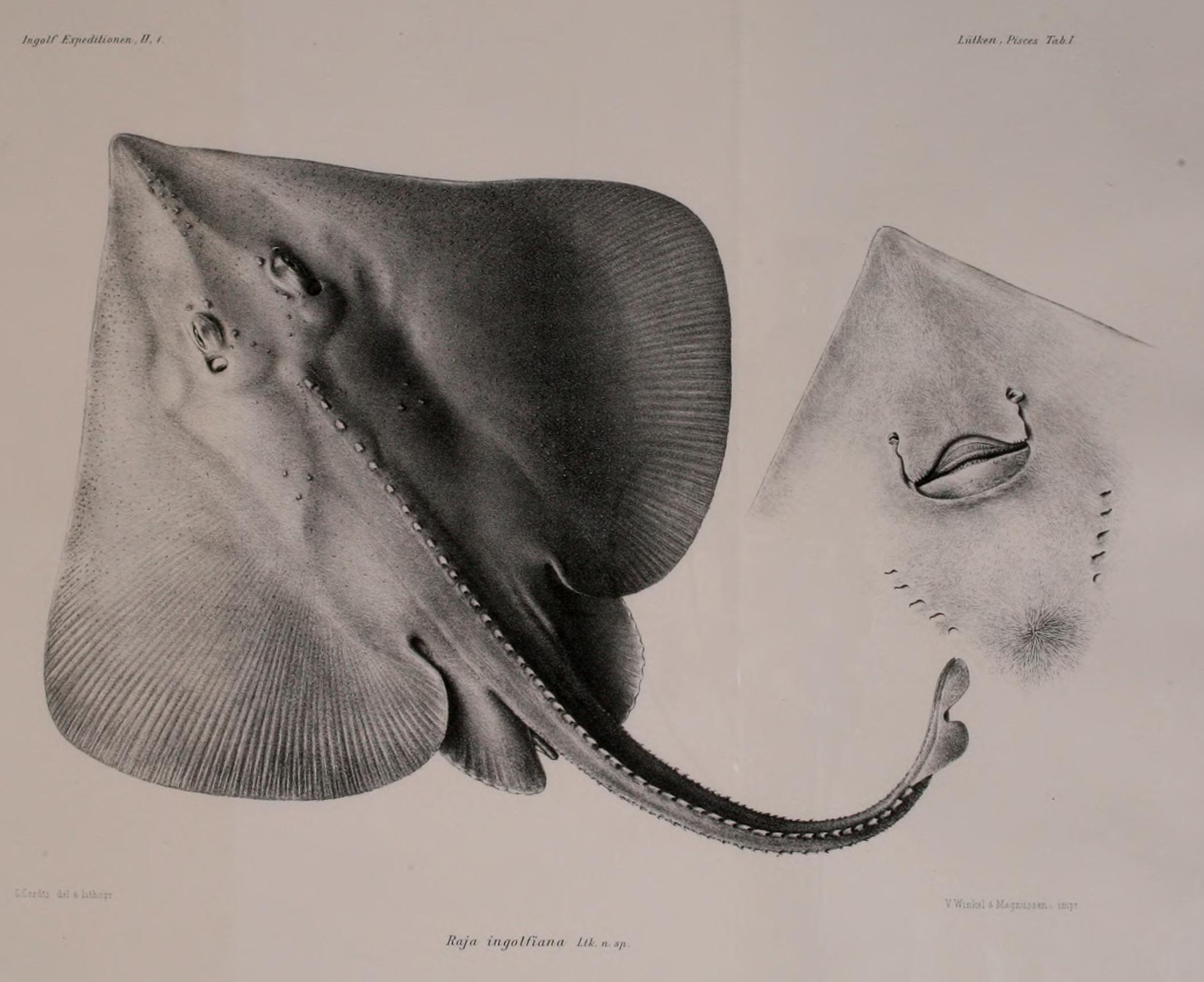

Conservation status
- Least Concern (IUCN 3.1)

Scientific classification
- Domain: Eukaryota
- Kingdom: Animalia
- Phylum: Chordata
- Class: Chondrichthyes
- Subclass: Elasmobranchii
- Order: Rajiformes
- Family: Rajidae
- Genus: Rajella
- Species: R. lintea

Binomial name
- Rajella lintea (Fries, 1838)

= Rajella lintea =

Species of fish

Rajella lintea is a species of fish belonging to the family Rajidae.

It is native to the coasts of Northern Atlantic Ocean.

Synonym:

- Dipturus linteus (Fries, 1838)
