= American legskate =

Conservation status
- Least Concern (IUCN 3.1)

Scientific classification
- Kingdom: Animalia
- Phylum: Chordata
- Class: Chondrichthyes
- Subclass: Elasmobranchii
- Order: Rajiformes
- Family: Anacanthobatidae
- Genus: Schroederobatis; Hulley, 1973
- Species: S. americana

Binomial name
- Schroederobatis americana (Bigelow & Schroeder, 1962)

Synonyms
- Anacanthobatis americana Bigelow & Schroeder, 1962

Species of cartilaginous fish

The American legskate (Schroederobatis americana) is a species of cartilaginous fish, a ray, belonging to the family Anacanthobatidae, the smooth skates. It is the only species in the monotypic genus Schroederobatis. This bathydemersal species is found in the southern Caribbean and off northern South America.

== Taxonomy ==
The American legskate was first formally described in 1962 as Anacanthobatis americana by Henry Bryant Bigelow and William Charles Schroeder with its type locality given as between Grenada and Venezuela at 11°35'N, 62°41'W, from a depth of 212 to 250 fathoms (1,272 to 1,500 ft; 388 to 457 m). In 1973 the South African ichthyologist P. Alexander Hulley proposed the subgenus Schroederobatis, of the genus Anacanthobatis for A. americana, and it remains the only species in that genus.

== Etymology ==
The American legskate is the only species in the genus Schroederobatis, an name honours Schroeder, the junior author of the description of this species, suffixing his name with -batis, meaning a "flat fish", and a word often used in the scientific names of rays. The specific name. americana means "of America".

== Description ==
The American legskate has a heart-shaped disc which is slightly wider than it is long and which has convex posterior margins with the posterior tips of the disc being unconnected to the body and reaching past the origin of the pelvic fins. The anterior margin of the disk or roughly straight until it begins to curve near the rounded tips of the pectoral fins. There is a long snout to the front of the eyes which is sharply pointed and terminates in a short, slender filament. The front lobes of the pelvic fins are long and slender, resembling legs and are clearly separated from the rear lobes. The caudal peduncle is slender, as is the tail which has small upper and lowerlobes. There is no dorsal fin. The skin is smooth, with no spines apart from the upper edges of the wings of males. The colour of the upper surface is uniform grey-brown while that of the lower surface is greyish-white, mottled with dark-brown to the rear of the mouth. This species has a maximum total length of 38 cm (15 in), and a maximum width from wingtip to wingtip of 40 cm (16 in).

== Distribution and habitat ==
The American legskate is found in the Western Atlantic Ocean where it occurs off Central and northern South America from Belize to Suriname, it has also been recorded off Hispaniola. It occurs on soft substrates close to the edge of the continental shelf and on the upper continental slopes at depths between 183 and 915 m (600 and 3,000 ft).
