= Holodactylus cornii =

Conservation status
- Data Deficient (IUCN 3.1)

Scientific classification
- Kingdom: Animalia
- Phylum: Chordata
- Class: Reptilia
- Order: Squamata
- Suborder: Gekkota
- Family: Eublepharidae
- Genus: Holodactylus
- Species: H. cornii

Binomial name
- Holodactylus cornii Scortecci, 1930

Species of lizard

Holodactylus cornii, also known as the East African clawed gecko, is a species of gecko that is endemic to Somalia in Eastern Africa.
