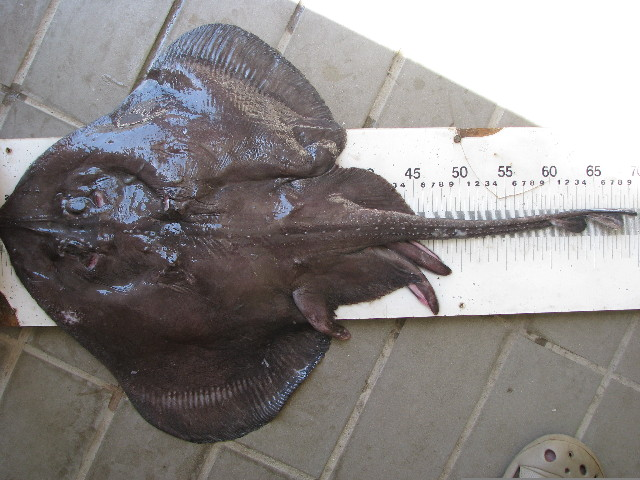
- Rajella barnardi

Scientific classification
- Kingdom: Animalia
- Phylum: Chordata
- Class: Chondrichthyes
- Subclass: Elasmobranchii
- Order: Rajiformes
- Family: Rajidae
- Genus: Rajella; Stehmann, 1970

Type species
- Raja fyllae Lütken, 1887

= Rajella =

Genus of cartilaginous fishes

Rajella is a genus of skate found deeper than 150 m (490 ft) in the Pacific, Atlantic and Indian oceans.

== Species ==
There are currently 18 recognized species in this genus:

- Rajella annandalei M. C. W. Weber, 1913 (Annandale's skate)
- Rajella barnardi Norman, 1935 (Bigthorn skate)
- Rajella bathyphila Holt & Byrne, 1908 (Deep-water ray)
- Rajella bigelowi Stehmann, 1978 (Bigelow's ray)
- Rajella caudaspinosa von Bonde & Swart, 1923 (Munchkin skate)
- Rajella challengeri Last & Stehmann, 2008 (Challenger skate)
- Rajella dissimilis Hulley, 1970 (Ghost skate)
- Rajella eisenhardti Long & McCosker, 1999 (Galápagos grey skate)
- Rajella fuliginea Bigelow & Schroeder, 1954 (Sooty skate)
- Rajella fyllae Lütken, 1887 (Round ray)
- Rajella kukujevi Dolganov, 1985 (Mid-Atlantic skate)
- Rajella leopardus von Bonde & Swart, 1923 (Leopard skate)
- Rajella lintea Fries, 1838 (Sailray)
- Rajella nigerrima F. de Buen, 1960 (Blackish skate)
- Rajella paucispinosa Weigmann, Stehmann & Thiel, 2014 (Sparsely-thorned skate)
- Rajella purpuriventralis Bigelow & Schroeder, 1962 (Purplebelly skate)
- Rajella ravidula Hulley, 1970 (Smoothback skate)
- Rajella sadowskii G. Krefft & Stehmann, 1974 (Brazilian skate)
