= Black legskate =

Conservation status
- Least Concern (IUCN 3.1)

Scientific classification
- Kingdom: Animalia
- Phylum: Chordata
- Class: Chondrichthyes
- Subclass: Elasmobranchii
- Order: Rajiformes
- Family: Anacanthobatidae
- Genus: Indobatis; Weigmann, Stehmann & Thiel, 2014
- Species: I. ori

Binomial name
- Indobatis ori (J. H. Wallace, 1967)

Synonyms
- Springeria ori J. H. Wallace, 1967; Anacanthobatis ori (J. H. Wallace, 1967)

Species of cartilaginous fish

The black legskate (Indobatis ori) is a species of smooth skate native to the Indian Ocean off of Madagascar and Mozambique. It is the only species in the monotypic genus Indobatis. It inhabits the continental slope at depths of from 1,000 to 1,725 metres (3,280 to 5,660 ft). This species can reach a length of 21 centimetres (8.3 in). It is dark-colored, greyish-black or brownish on the dorsum, ventrally lighter.
