= Blackish skate =

Conservation status
- Least Concern (IUCN 3.1)

Scientific classification
- Kingdom: Animalia
- Phylum: Chordata
- Class: Chondrichthyes
- Subclass: Elasmobranchii
- Order: Rajiformes
- Family: Rajidae
- Genus: Rajella
- Species: R. nigerrima

Binomial name
- Rajella nigerrima (F. de Buen, 1960)

Species of fish

The blackish skate (Rajella nigerrima) is a species of fish in the family Rajidae. It is found in Chile, Ecuador, and Peru. Its natural habitat is open seas.
