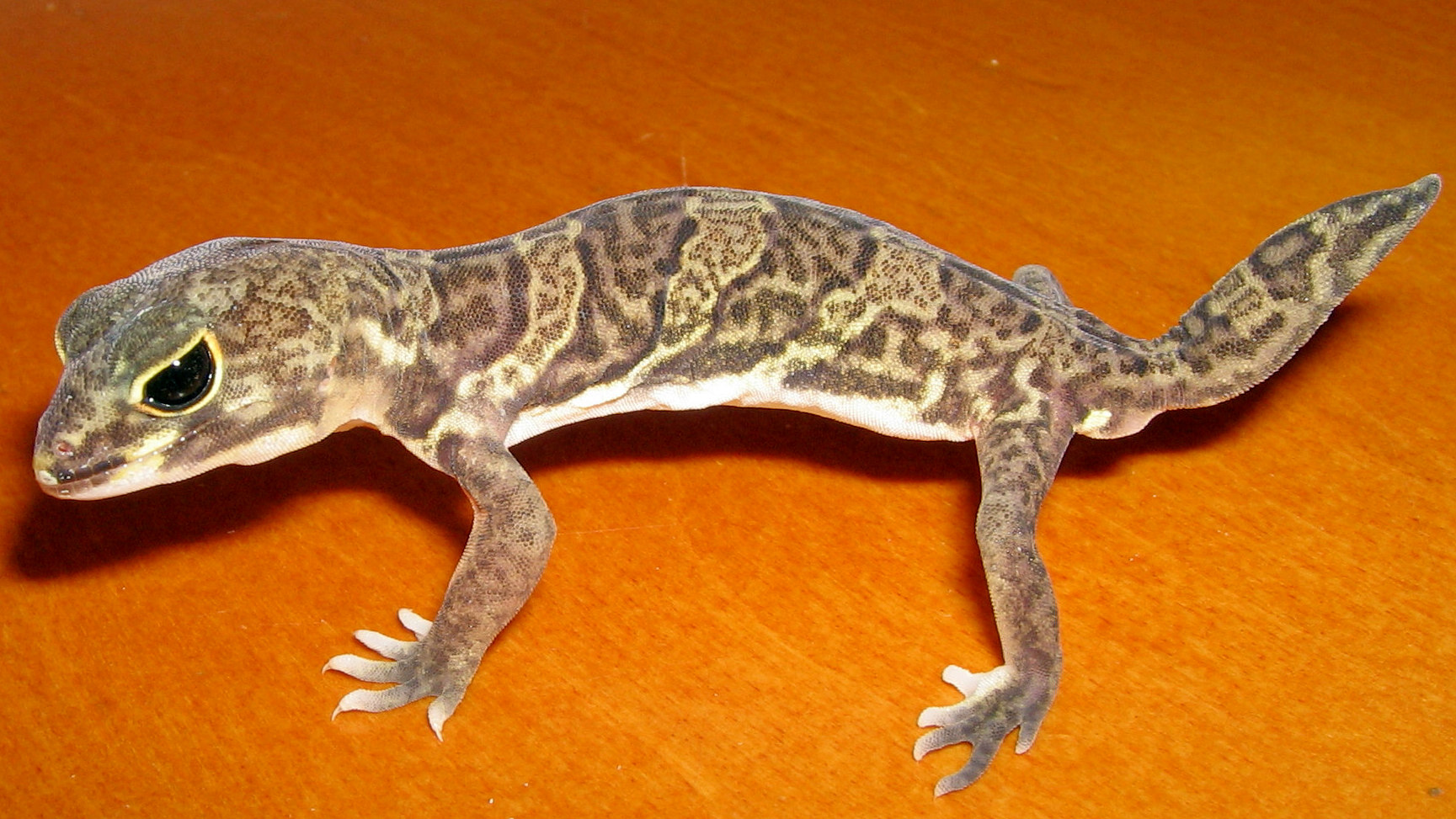
- Holodactylus africanus

Scientific classification
- Kingdom: Animalia
- Phylum: Chordata
- Class: Reptilia
- Order: Squamata
- Suborder: Gekkota
- Family: Eublepharidae
- Genus: Holodactylus; Boettger, 1893

= Holodactylus =

Genus of lizards

Holodactylus is a genus of small geckos, collectively known as the clawed geckos.

== Distribution ==
Both species in the genus live in northeastern Africa. The range of Holodactylus africanus stretches from the Maasai Steppe, on the border between Kenya and Tanzania to Ethiopia. The second species Holodactylus cornii has only been found in Ethiopia and Somalia.

== Habitat ==
These terrestrial geckos mainly inhabit arid steppes and savannas. The females usually lay two soft-shelled eggs which are subsequently buried in moist substrate.

== Species ==
- African clawed gecko, (Holodactylus africanus)
- East African clawed gecko, (Holodactylus cornii)
