= Brazilian skate =

Conservation status
- Least Concern (IUCN 3.1)

Scientific classification
- Kingdom: Animalia
- Phylum: Chordata
- Class: Chondrichthyes
- Subclass: Elasmobranchii
- Order: Rajiformes
- Family: Rajidae
- Genus: Rajella
- Species: R. sadowskii

Binomial name
- Rajella sadowskii (G. Krefft & Stehmann, 1974)

Species of fish

The Brazilian skate (Rajella sadowskii) is a species of fish in the family Rajidae. It is found in Brazil and Chile. Its natural habitat is open seas. It is not well known but is thought to be threatened by bycatch of Patagonian toothfish.
