= Sinobatis =

Scientific classification
- Kingdom: Animalia
- Phylum: Chordata
- Class: Chondrichthyes
- Subclass: Elasmobranchii
- Order: Rajiformes
- Family: Anacanthobatidae
- Genus: Sinobatis; Hulley, 1973

Type species
- Anacanthobatis borneensis W. L. Y. Chan, 1965

Genus of cartilaginous fishes

Sinobatis is a genus of rays in the family Anacanthobatidae native to deep water in the Indo-Pacific Ocean.

== Species ==
Nine recognized species are in this genus:

- Sinobatis andamanensis Last & Bussarawit, 2016 (Andaman legskate)
- Sinobatis borneensis (W. L. Y. Chan, 1965) (Borneo legskate)
- Sinobatis brevicauda Weigmann & Stehmann, 2016 (short-tail legskate)
- Sinobatis bulbicauda Last & Séret, 2008 (western Australian legskate)
- Sinobatis caerulea Last & Séret, 2008 (blue legskate)
- Sinobatis filicauda Last & Séret, 2008 (eastern Australian legskate)
- Sinobatis kotlyari Stehmann & Weigmann, 2016 (Kotlyar's legskate)
- Sinobatis melanosoma (W. L. Y. Chan, 1965) (black-bodied legskate)
- Sinobatis stenosoma (S. Li & A. S. Hu, 1982) (narrow leg skate)
