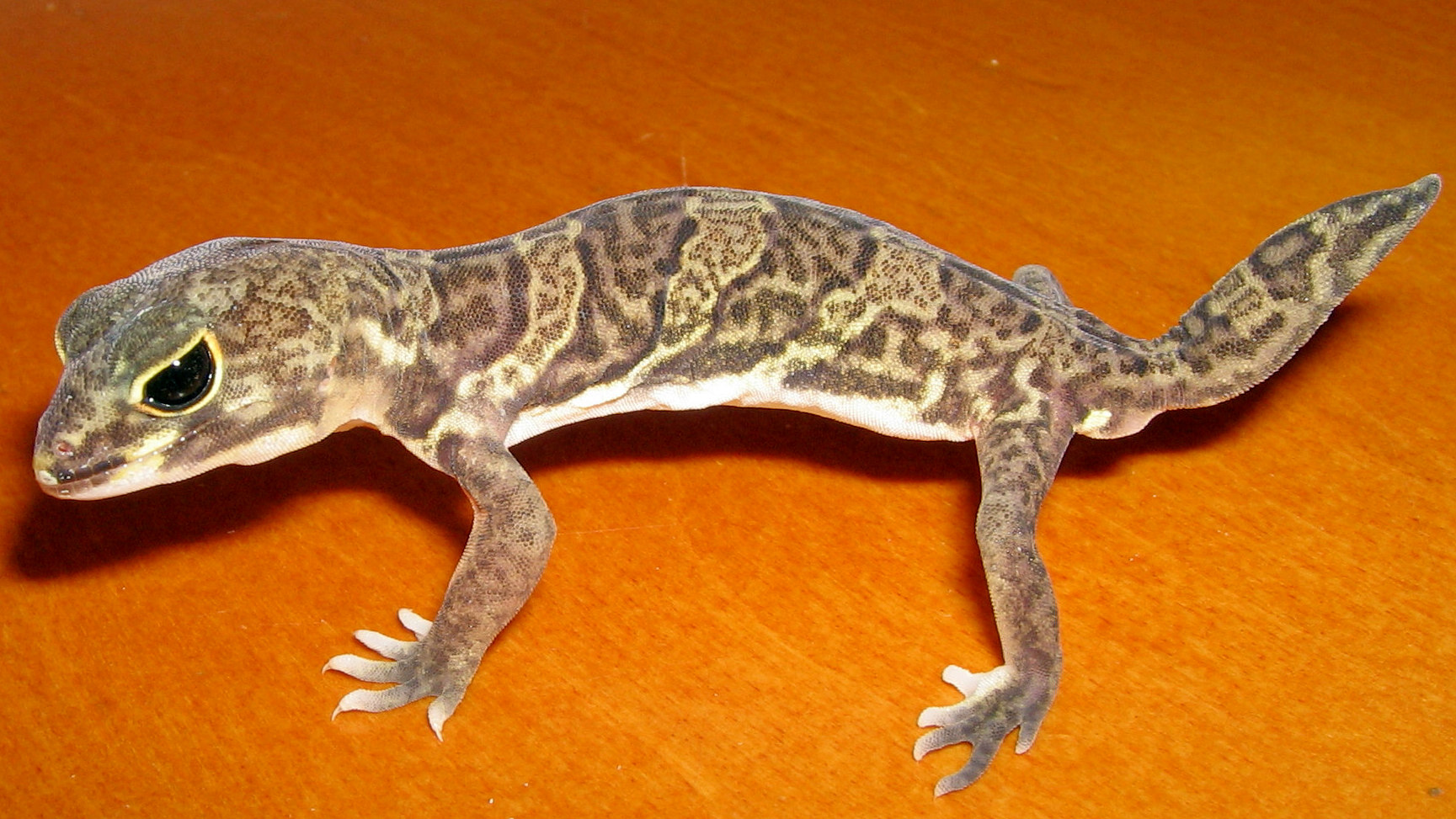

Conservation status
- Least Concern (IUCN 3.1)

Scientific classification
- Kingdom: Animalia
- Phylum: Chordata
- Class: Reptilia
- Order: Squamata
- Suborder: Gekkota
- Family: Eublepharidae
- Genus: Holodactylus
- Species: H. africanus

Binomial name
- Holodactylus africanus Boettger, 1893

= Holodactylus africanus =

Species of lizard

Holodactylus africanus, also known as the African clawed gecko, Boettger's strong-clawed gecko, or African whole-toed gecko, is a species of gecko that is commonly found in Eastern Africa. The gecko has a big head, thin body, stumpy tail, and has tan and brown bands. The adults are 3.5 to 4 in (8.9 to 10.2 cm) long.
