= Leopard skate =

Conservation status
- Least Concern (IUCN 3.1)

Scientific classification
- Kingdom: Animalia
- Phylum: Chordata
- Class: Chondrichthyes
- Subclass: Elasmobranchii
- Order: Rajiformes
- Family: Rajidae
- Genus: Rajella
- Species: R. leoparda

Binomial name
- Rajella leoparda (von Bonde & Swart, 1923)

Synonyms
- Raia leopardus; Rajella leopardus

Species of fish

The leopard skate (Rajella leoparda) is a species of fish in the family Rajidae. It is found in Namibia and South Africa. Its natural habitat is open seas.
