= Munchkin skate =

Conservation status
- Least Concern (IUCN 3.1)

Scientific classification
- Kingdom: Animalia
- Phylum: Chordata
- Class: Chondrichthyes
- Subclass: Elasmobranchii
- Order: Rajiformes
- Family: Rajidae
- Genus: Rajella
- Species: R. caudaspinosa

Binomial name
- Rajella caudaspinosa (von Bonde & Swart, 1923)

Species of fish

The munchkin skate (Rajella caudaspinosa) is a species of fish in the family Rajidae. It is found in Namibia and South Africa. Its natural habitat is open seas.
