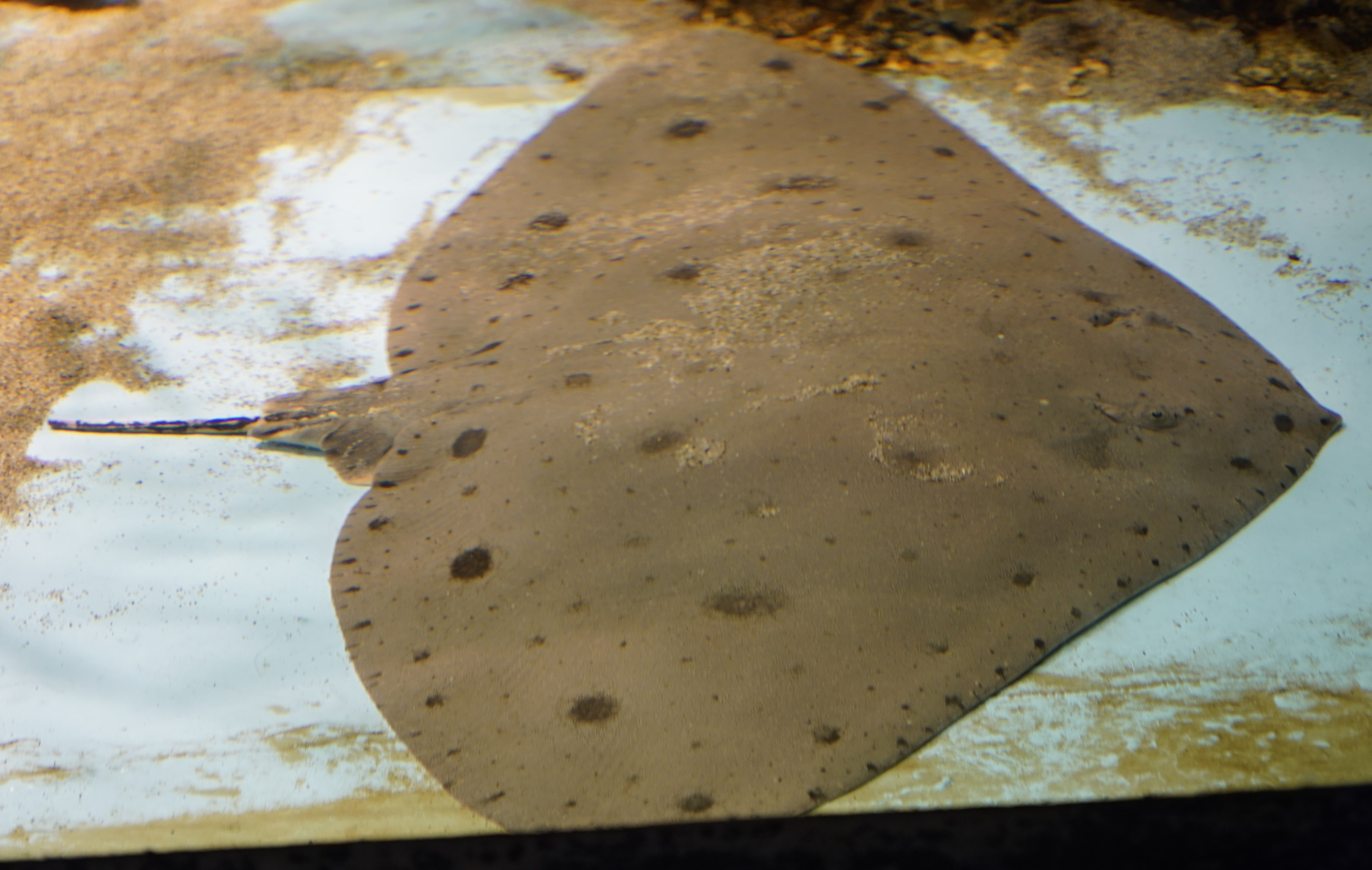

Conservation status
- Vulnerable (IUCN 3.1)

Scientific classification
- Kingdom: Animalia
- Phylum: Chordata
- Class: Chondrichthyes
- Subclass: Elasmobranchii
- Order: Myliobatiformes
- Family: Gymnuridae
- Genus: Gymnura
- Species: G. japonica

Binomial name
- Gymnura japonica (Temminck & Schlegel, 1850)

Synonyms
- Gymnura bimaculata (Norman, 1925)

= Gymnura japonica =

Species of cartilaginous fish

Gymnura japonica, the Japanese butterfly ray, is a species of ray in the family Gymnuridae. It is found from Japan to Cambodia.
