= Smoothback skate =

Conservation status
- Least Concern (IUCN 3.1)

Scientific classification
- Kingdom: Animalia
- Phylum: Chordata
- Class: Chondrichthyes
- Subclass: Elasmobranchii
- Order: Rajiformes
- Family: Rajidae
- Genus: Rajella
- Species: R. ravidula

Binomial name
- Rajella ravidula (Hulley, 1970)

Species of fish

The smoothback skate (Rajella ravidula) is a species of fish in the family Rajidae. It is found in Namibia and South Africa. Its natural habitat is open seas. Males can reach 70 cm in total length.
