= Thorny lanternshark =

Conservation status
- Least Concern (IUCN 3.1)

Scientific classification
- Kingdom: Animalia
- Phylum: Chordata
- Class: Chondrichthyes
- Subclass: Elasmobranchii
- Division: Selachii
- Order: Squaliformes
- Family: Etmopteridae
- Genus: Etmopterus
- Species: E. sentosus

Binomial name
- Etmopterus sentosus (Bass, D'Aubrey & Kistnasamy, 1976)
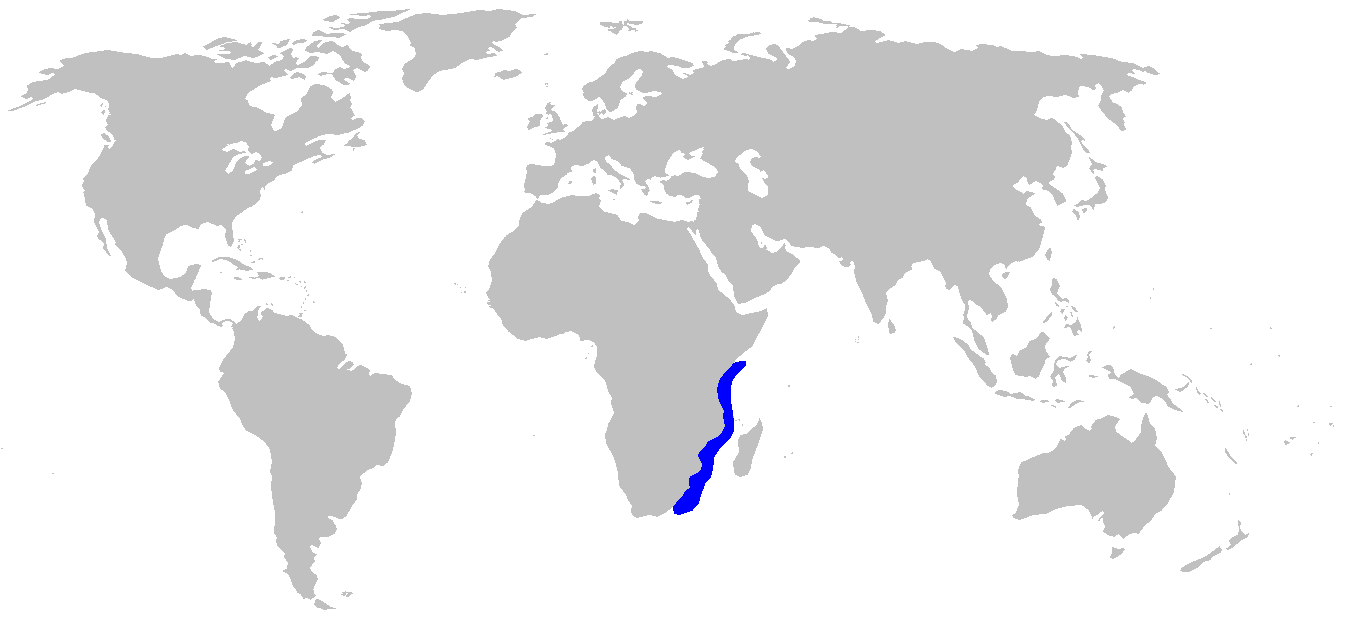
- Range of the thorny lanternshark (in blue)

Species of shark

The thorny lanternshark (Etmopterus sentosus) is a shark of the family Etmopteridae found in the western Indian Ocean between latitudes 0° and 31°S, at depths between 200 and 500 m. Its length is up to 27 cm.

Reproduction is ovoviviparous.
