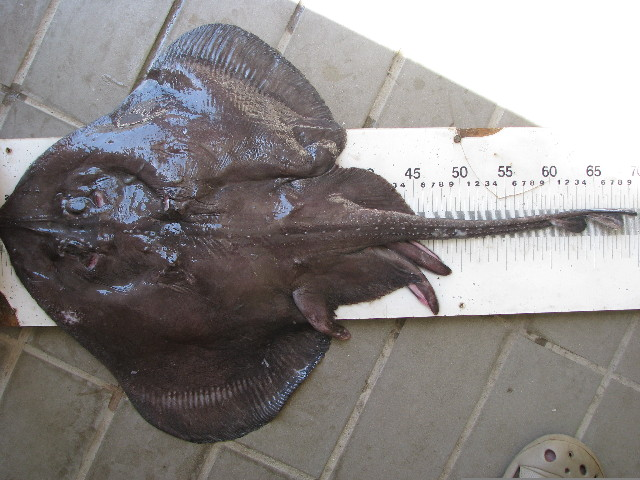

Conservation status
- Least Concern (IUCN 3.1)

Scientific classification
- Kingdom: Animalia
- Phylum: Chordata
- Class: Chondrichthyes
- Subclass: Elasmobranchii
- Order: Rajiformes
- Family: Rajidae
- Genus: Rajella
- Species: R. barnardi

Binomial name
- Rajella barnardi (Norman, 1935)

= Bigthorn skate =

Species of fish

The bigthorn skate (Rajella barnardi) is a species of fish in the family Rajidae. It is found in Equatorial Guinea, Gambia, Ghana, Guinea, Guinea-Bissau, Mauritania, Morocco, Namibia, Senegal, Sierra Leone, South Africa, Western Sahara, possibly Angola, possibly Benin, possibly Cameroon, possibly the Republic of the Congo, possibly Ivory Coast, possibly Gabon, possibly Liberia, possibly Nigeria, and possibly Togo. Its natural habitat is open seas.

== Description ==
Fairly large spines at eyes and along centre of back and tail. Colour brown with groups of lighter spots. Recorded size up to 102 cm.

== Synonyms ==
- Raja barnardi Norman, 1935
- Raja confundens Hulley, 1970
- Raja dageti Capapé, 1977
