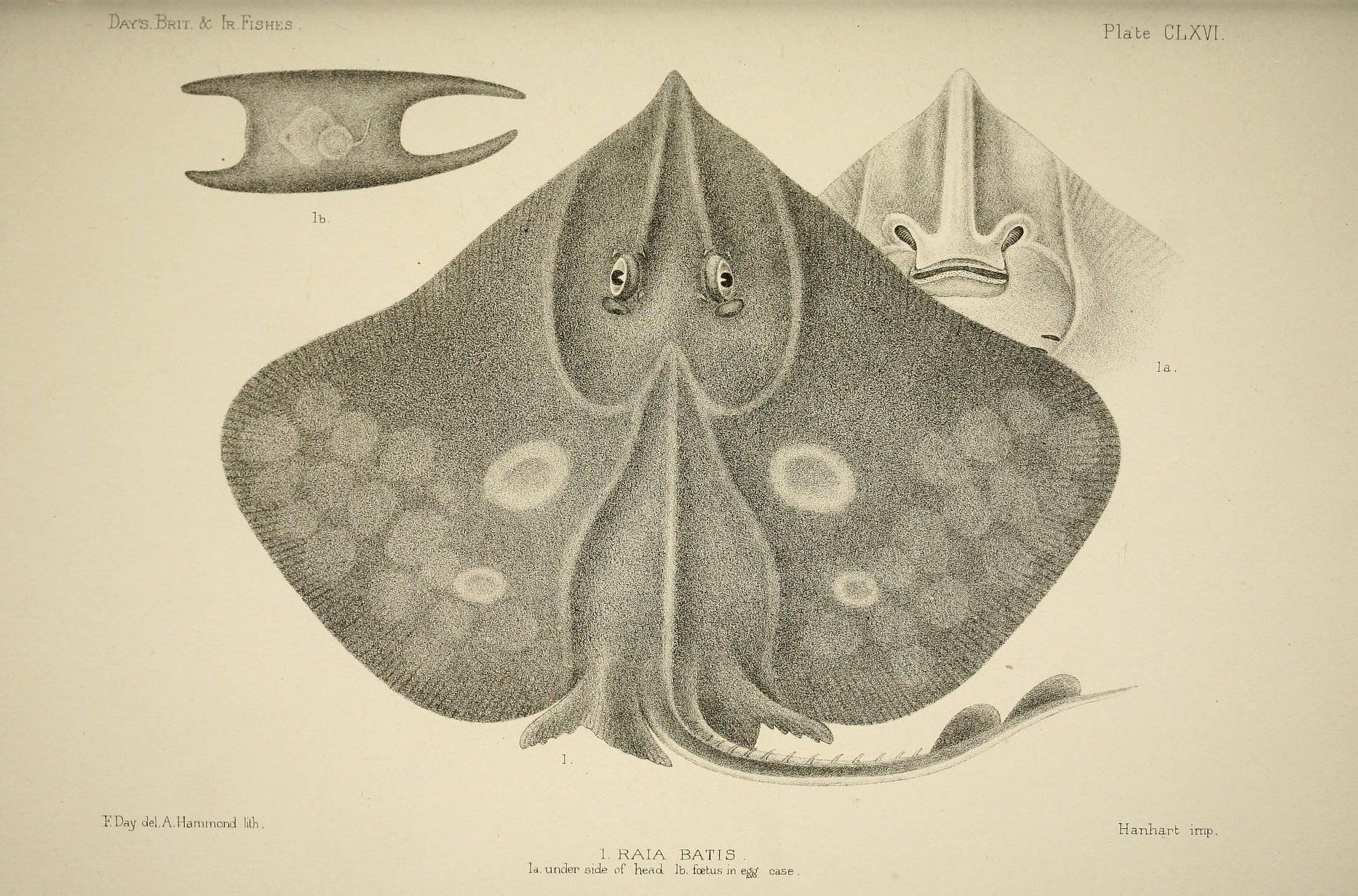

Conservation status
- Least Concern (IUCN 3.1)

Scientific classification
- Kingdom: Animalia
- Phylum: Chordata
- Class: Chondrichthyes
- Subclass: Elasmobranchii
- Order: Rajiformes
- Family: Rajidae
- Genus: Dipturus
- Species: D. pullopunctatus

Binomial name
- Dipturus pullopunctatus (J. L. B. Smith, 1964)

= Slimeskate =

Species of fish

The slimeskate (Dipturus pullopunctatus) is a species of fish in the family Rajidae. It is found on soft bottoms of the outer shelf and upper slope on the coast of South Africa and Namibia.
