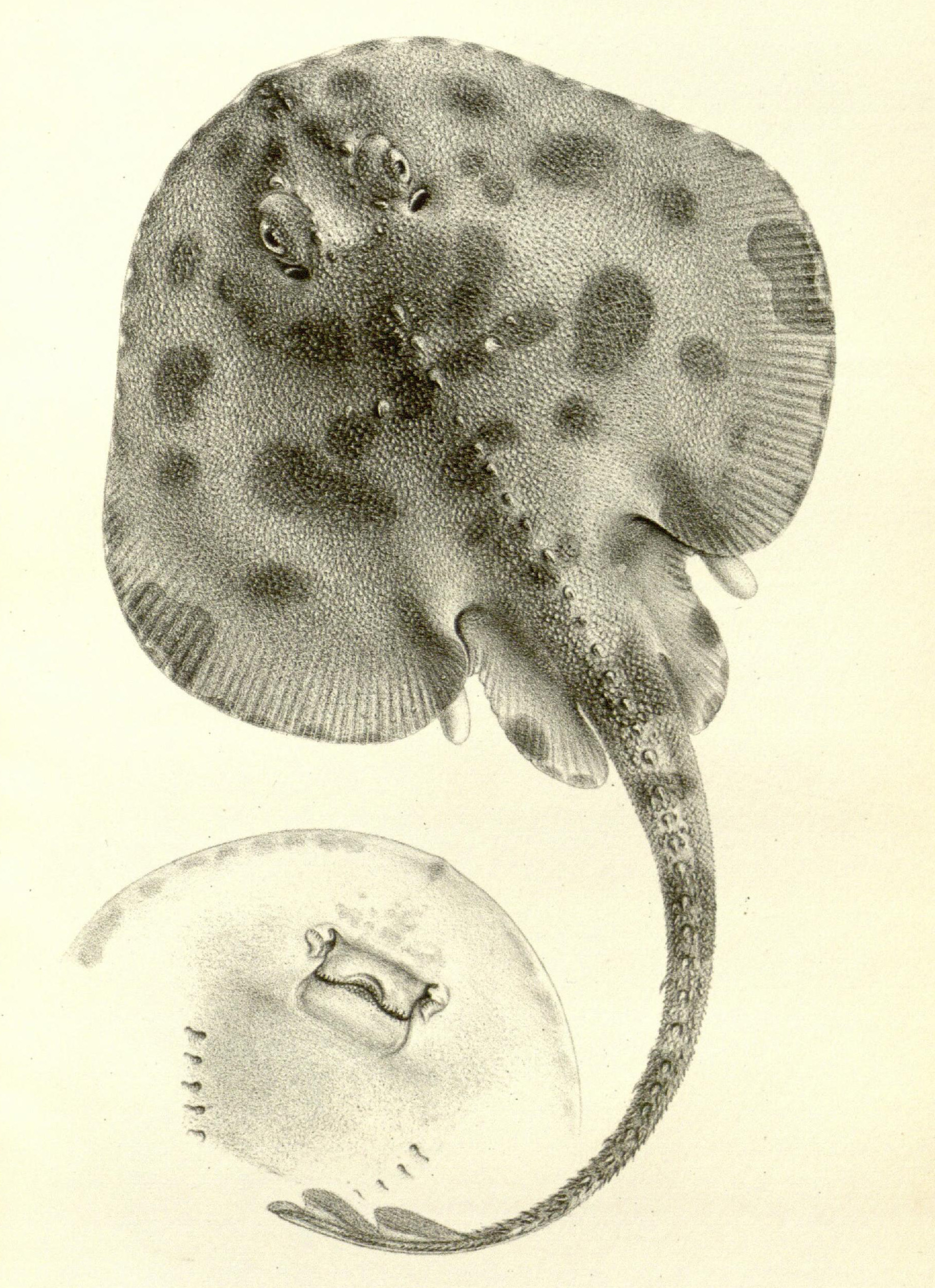
- Illustration of a young female Raja fyllae by Lütken, 1887

Conservation status
- Least Concern (IUCN 3.1)

Scientific classification
- Kingdom: Animalia
- Phylum: Chordata
- Class: Chondrichthyes
- Subclass: Elasmobranchii
- Order: Rajiformes
- Family: Rajidae
- Genus: Rajella
- Species: R. fyllae

Binomial name
- Rajella fyllae Lütken, 1887

Synonyms
- Raja fyllae Lütken, 1887; Raja fyllae lipacantha Jensen, 1905

= Rajella fyllae =

Species of ray fish

Rajella fyllae is a species of skate in the family Rajidae.

== Name ==
The scientific name fyllae refers to the ship HDMS Fylla, from where the holotype was collected by the Fylla scientific expeditions of 1884 and 1886 to Greenland.

It is sometimes called the round ray or round skate, but those names are also used for the family Urotrygonidae or the genera Heliotrygon and Irolita. The name Fylla's ray is also used, perhaps by writers who thought that "Fylla" was the name of a person.

== Distribution ==
The round ray lives in the North Atlantic Ocean and Arctic Ocean. It is a benthic fish, found in depths of 147–2,055 m (482–6,742 ft), typically 300–800 m (980–2,620 ft); in cold deeper continental shelf waters, 3–5.5 °C (37–42 °F).

== Description ==
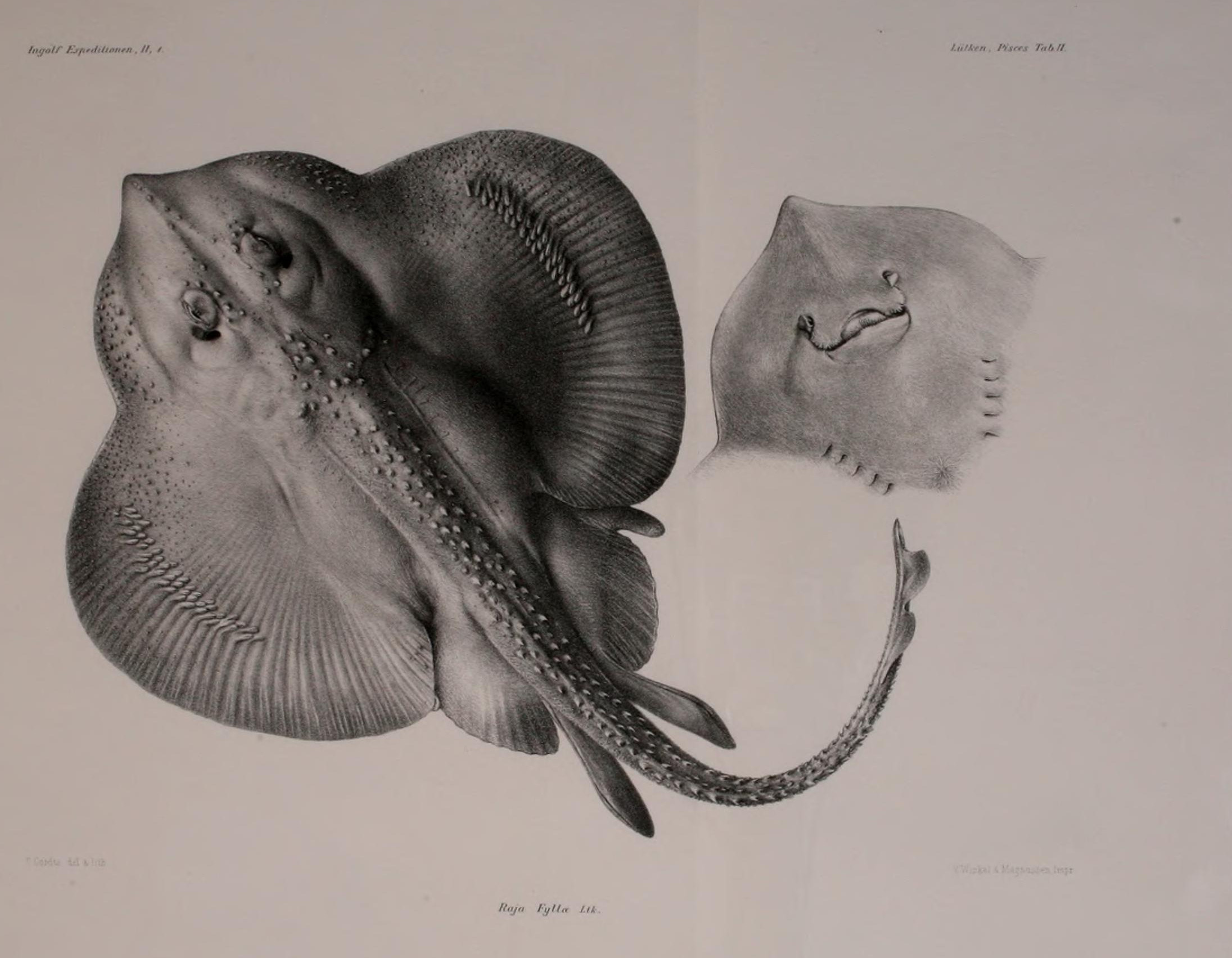
Illustration of an adult male by Lütken, 1898

Like all rays, the round ray has a flattened body with broad, wing-like pectoral fins. Its maximum length is 60 cm (2.0 ft). Its dorsal (upper) surface is grey or brown, with the lower surface light gray or fawn, with dark patches on the pelvic fins and axils of pectoral fins. The upper and lower jaws have 30-38 rows. Adult males have both alar and malar thorns. The dorsal fins are confluent and there are no interdorsal thorns. Larger specimens have 5-9 orbital thorns.

== Behaviour ==
Rajella fyllae feeds on mysids, copepods, crustaceans and amphipods.

In breeding, there is a distinct pairing of the male and female, with an "embrace." It is oviparous, the egg cases being oblong with stiff pointed "horns" in the corners; they are deposited in sandy or muddy flats. The egg cases measure 3–4 centimetres (1.2–1.6 in) long and 2–3 centimetres (0.79–1.18 in) wide. The total length of the round ray at birth is around 7–11 centimetres (2.8–4.3 in).

== See also ==
- Fish of the Atlantic Ocean
- Fish of the Arctic Ocean
