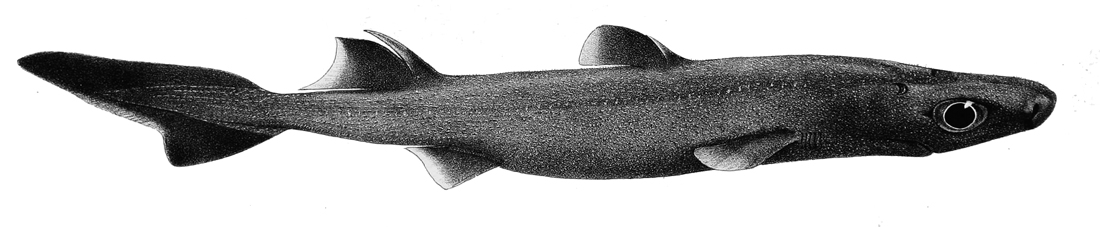

Conservation status
- Least Concern (IUCN 3.1)

Scientific classification
- Kingdom: Animalia
- Phylum: Chordata
- Class: Chondrichthyes
- Subclass: Elasmobranchii
- Division: Selachii
- Order: Squaliformes
- Family: Etmopteridae
- Genus: Etmopterus
- Species: E. granulosus

Binomial name
- Etmopterus granulosus (Günther, 1880)
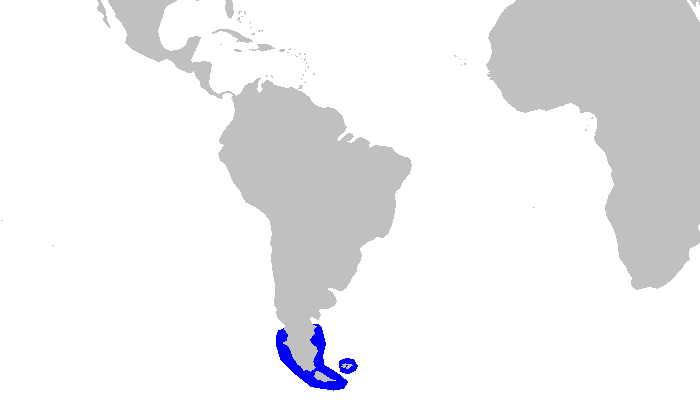
- Range of the southern lanternshark (in blue)

Synonyms
- Etmopterus baxteri Garrick, 1957

= Southern lanternshark =

Species of shark

The southern lanternshark (Etmopterus granulosus) is a shark of the family Etmopteridae found in the southeast Pacific between latitudes 29°S and 59°S, at depths of between 220 and 1,460 m. This species has been found off Northland, off the Chatham Islands, on the Campbell Plateau, all in New Zealand waters. Its length is up to 60 cm. Reproduction is ovoviviparous, with 10 to 13 pups in a litter, length at birth about 18 cm. They exhibit bioluminescence.

Parasites of the southern lanternshark, studied off Chile, include Monogeneans, Digeneans, Cestodes, Nematodes, and Copepodes.

In June 2018 the New Zealand Department of Conservation classified E. granulosus as "Not Threatened" with the qualifier "Secure Overseas" under the New Zealand Threat Classification System.
