= Ghost skate =

Conservation status
- Least Concern (IUCN 3.1)

Scientific classification
- Kingdom: Animalia
- Phylum: Chordata
- Class: Chondrichthyes
- Subclass: Elasmobranchii
- Order: Rajiformes
- Family: Rajidae
- Genus: Rajella
- Species: R. dissimilis

Binomial name
- Rajella dissimilis (Hulley, 1970)

Species of fish

The ghost skate (Rajella dissimilis) is a species of fish in the family Rajidae. It is found in Namibia and South Africa. Its natural habitat is open seas.

== Description ==
The ghost skate is a deepsea skate of medium size. The maximum total length of the species is 82 centimetres (32 in) for females and 79 centimetres (31 in) for males. The snout has a short pronounced tip and is small. It has confluent dorsal fins and no interdorsal thorns. The ventral surface is mostly smooth, while the dorsal surface of the disc is covered in dermal denticles, with males being smoother, and the tail is prickly. There are between 1-8 orbital thorns which occur in a semicircular pattern around the eyes. Adult males have both alar and malar thorns. The dorsal surface is grey to dark greyish-brown in colour, and the ventral surface is white with thick dark margins and a mottled ventral tail surface with a white-coloured tip. The upper and lower jaws have between 33-41 rows.

== Distribution and habitat ==
The species is benthic, and has been found at depths of 400–1,640 metres (1,310–5,380 ft).

== Biology ==
Ghost skates are oviparous, with egg cases measuring 8 centimetres (3.1 in) long and 4 centimetres (1.6 in) wide. The total length at birth is around 13 centimetres (5.1 in) Ghost skates eat small bony fishes, crustaceans, and cephalopods.
