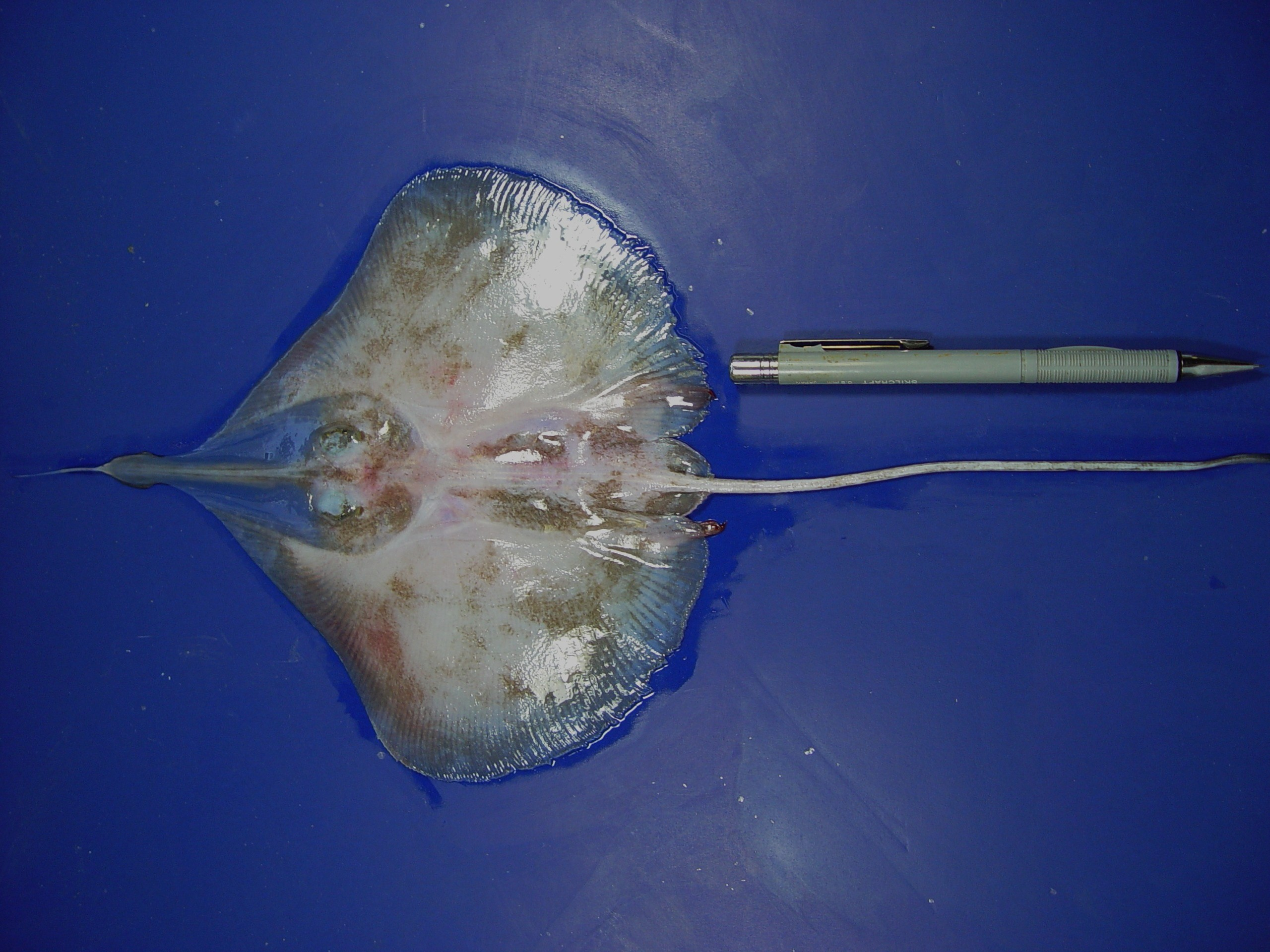
- Leaf-nose leg skate (Springeria folirostris)

Scientific classification
- Kingdom: Animalia
- Phylum: Chordata
- Class: Chondrichthyes
- Subclass: Elasmobranchii
- Order: Rajiformes
- Family: Anacanthobatidae
- Genus: Springeria; Bigelow & Schroeder, 1951

Type species
- Springeria folirostris Bigelow & Schroeder, 1951

= Springeria =

Genus of cartilaginous fish

Springeria is a genus of cartilaginous fish belonging to the family Anacanthobatidae, the smooth skates. The two species in this genus are found in the central Western Atlantic.

== Taxonomy ==
Springeria was first proposed as a monospecific genus in 1951 by the American biologists Henry Bryant Bigelow and William Charles Schroeder when they described Springeria folirostris. Springeria foliorostris has its type locality given as the northern Gulf of Mexico off the mouth of the Mississippi at 29°02'N, 88°34'W from a depth between 232 and 258 fathoms (1,392 and 1,548 ft; 424 and 472 m). This genus is classified within the family Anacanthobatidae which belongs to the order Rajiformes.

== Etymology ==
Springeria honors the American ichthyologist Stewart Springer, who studied cartilaginous fishes in Florida and the Gulf of Mexico.

== Species ==
Springeria contains the following two valid recognised species:

- Springeria folirostris Bigelow & Schroeder, 1951 (Leaf-nose leg skate)
- Springeria longirostris (Bigelow & Schroeder 1962) (Longnose leg skate)

== Characteristics ==
Springeria legskates have a heart-shaped disc which is slightly wider between its wingtips than its total length. The posterior margins of the discare concave with the rear tips ending beyond the origin of the pelvic fins. The front margins of the disc are straight, although it is slightly wavy in front of the eyes and on the snout. The pectoral fins have rounded tips. The snout is elongated and has a sharply pointed tip which has a filament at its tip which is supported by cartilage. The pelvic fins have two lobes. the front lobes are slender and leg–like, these are clearly separate from rear lobes. The tail is very thin, resembling a whip and is subequal to the length of the disc. There is no dorsal fin and the upper and lower caudal fin lobes are very small and membranous. The skin of the disc smooth, with no spines, on either the upper or lower surfaces. S. longirostris has a maximum published total length of 75 cm (30 in) while S. folirostris has a maximum published total length of 40 cm (16 in).

== Distribution and habitat ==
Springeria legskates are found in the Western central Atlantic Ocean around the gulf of Mexico and the Caribbean Sea. These rays are found on soft substrates on the continental slope at depths between 300 and 1,052 m (984 and 3,451 ft).
