= Short-tail lanternshark =

Conservation status
- Data Deficient (IUCN 3.1)

Scientific classification
- Kingdom: Animalia
- Phylum: Chordata
- Class: Chondrichthyes
- Subclass: Elasmobranchii
- Division: Selachii
- Order: Squaliformes
- Family: Etmopteridae
- Genus: Etmopterus
- Species: E. brachyurus

Binomial name
- Etmopterus brachyurus (H. M. Smith & Radcliffe, 1912)
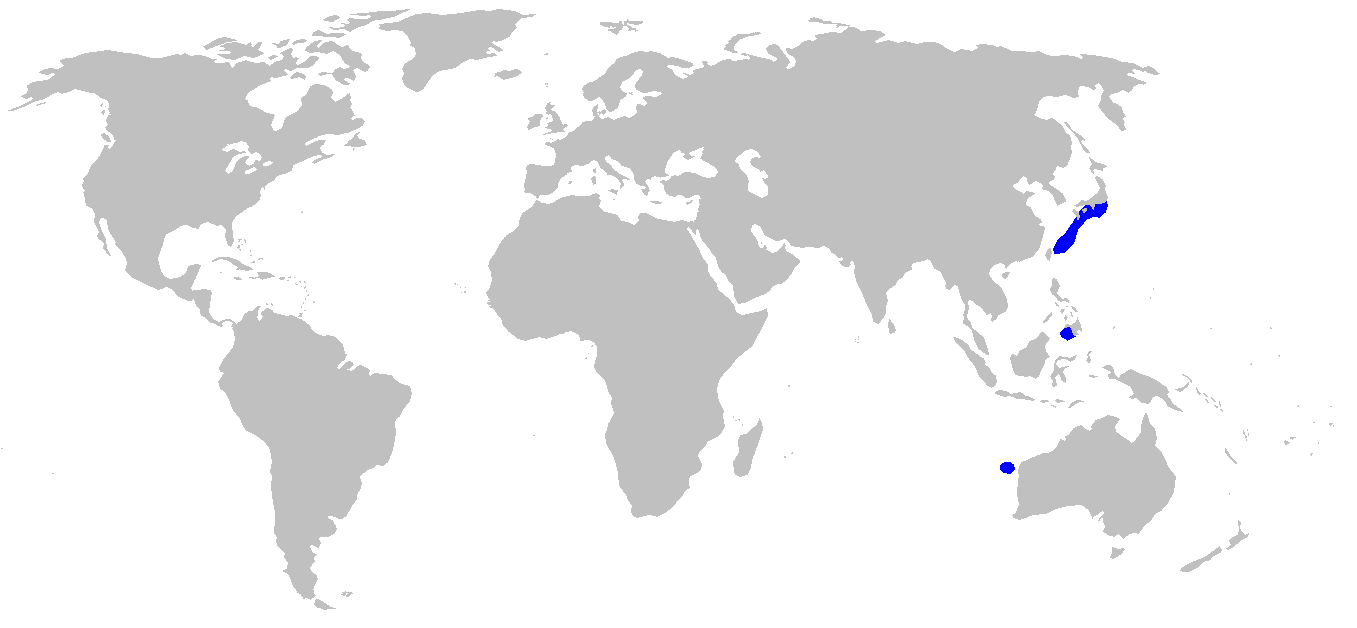
- Range of the short-tail lanternshark (in blue)

Species of shark

The short-tail lanternshark (Etmopterus brachyurus) is a shark of the family Etmopteridae found in the western Pacific between latitudes 37°N and 30°S, at depths of between 450 and 900 m (1,480 and 2,950 ft). Its length is up to 50 cm (20 in).

Reproduction is ovoviviparous.
