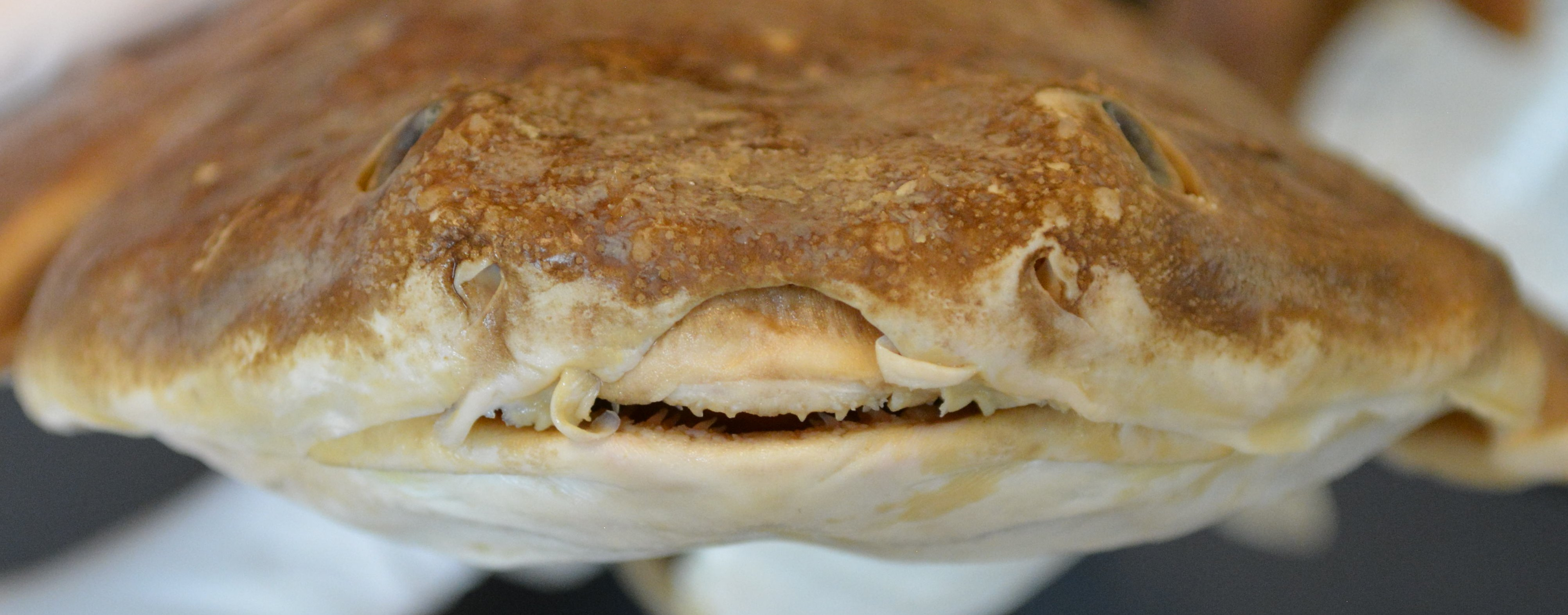

Conservation status
- Near Threatened (IUCN 3.1)

Scientific classification
- Kingdom: Animalia
- Phylum: Chordata
- Class: Chondrichthyes
- Subclass: Elasmobranchii
- Division: Selachii
- Order: Squatiniformes
- Family: Squatinidae
- Genus: Squatina
- Species: S. africana

Binomial name
- Squatina africana Regan, 1908
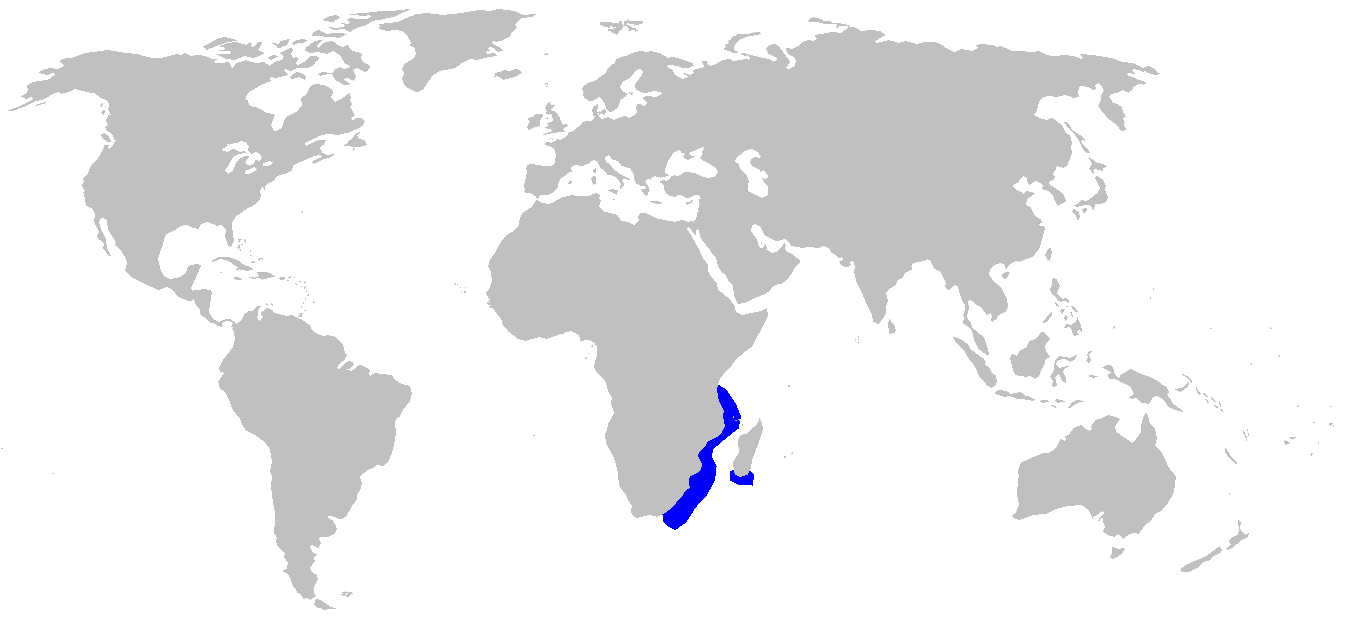
- Range of African angelshark (in blue)

= African angelshark =

Species of shark

The African angelshark (Squatina africana) is an angelshark of the family Squatinidae.

== Measurements ==
When born, African angelsharks measure between 28 cm to 30 cm. Mature specimens vary in size with gender, with males averaging about 80 cm, and females around 90 cm. The maximum known size of an African angelshark is about 122 cm.

== Identification ==
The African angelshark varies in color between greyish to reddish brown. They have many light and dark spots, which often present in young individuals as large, granular-centered eyespots. As they grow, they gain larger symmetrical dark pigmented bands or saddles, as well as blotches on their broad, angular, high pectoral fins. They have a dark tail base with large margins.

The African angelshark has simple flat nasal barbels, with tips that are tapered or spatulate. They have anterior nasal flaps (flaps which partially or completely cover the nostrils.) which are smooth or slightly fringed. They have enlarged thorns on their heads, which do not extend onto their backs. They have a concave space between their eyes. They do not have angular lobes on their lateral dermal flaps.

== Distribution and Range ==
The African angelshark is found in the Western Indian Ocean, primarily along the eastern coast of Africa, from South Africa to Tanzania and out to Madagascar, though possibly extending as far North as Somalia. Additionally, there are nominal records of its presence in West Africa, though there is little to no proof of this, and it is possible that sightings may have been of another similar species.

== Climate and habitat ==
The African angelshark is usually found in subtropical areas in sand and mud along the continental shelf and upper slope. It has been recorded at depths of up to 494 m, but is usually found between 60 m and 300 m below sea level.

== Behavior ==
Lies in wait buried underneath sand or mud to ambush its prey with lightning-fast reflexes and great precision.

== Biology ==
Diet: Feeds on small bony fishes, squid and octopuses, and including shrimp. Reproduction: Is ovoviviparous and gives birth to at least 7 or 11 pups per litter.

== Status ==
IUCN Red List: near threatened. It is common only on the east coast of South Africa. Trawl fishery bycatch.

== Threat to humans ==
Traumatogenic.

== Resilience and vulnerability ==
Very low, minimum population doubling time more than 14 years; high vulnerability.
