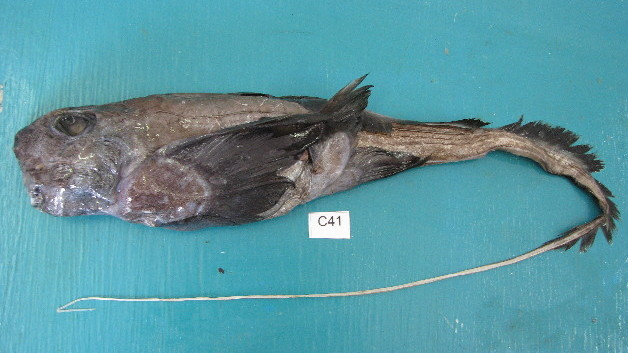

Conservation status
- Least Concern (IUCN 3.1)

Scientific classification
- Kingdom: Animalia
- Phylum: Chordata
- Class: Chondrichthyes
- Subclass: Holocephali
- Order: Chimaeriformes
- Family: Chimaeridae
- Genus: Hydrolagus
- Species: H. africanus

Binomial name
- Hydrolagus africanus (Gilchrist, 1922)

= African chimaera =

Species of fish

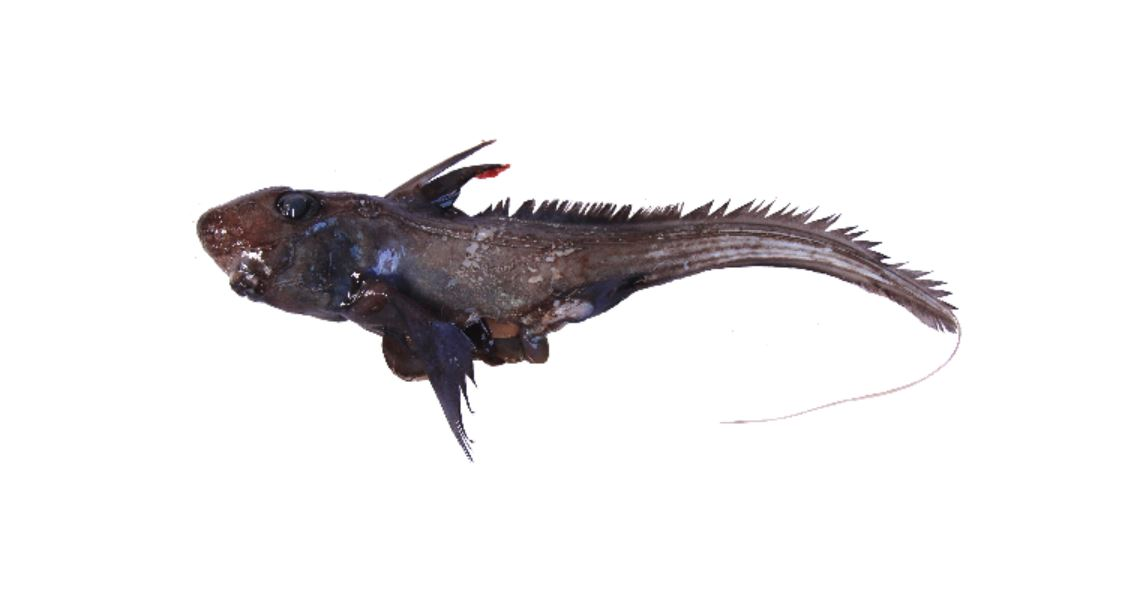
Hydrolagus africanus from deep-waters of Andaman and Nicobar Islands, image from the survey of FORV Sagar Sampada in 2016

The African chimaera (Hydrolagus africanus) is a species of fish in the family Chimaeridae found near Kenya, Mozambique, Namibia, and South Africa. Its natural habitat is deep-waters up to the depth of 750 m Eight species of chimaera are found in the southern African region, representing the three families and all six genera.

== Distribution ==
Hydrolagus africanus distributed in the western Indian Ocean from Kenya and Mozambique to the Western Cape province, South Africa, and in the south-eastern Atlantic along the west coast of South Africa north to Angola. However, there are informations on this species from Thailand, off the southwest coast of India, Arabian Sea and Andaman Nicobar Islands.

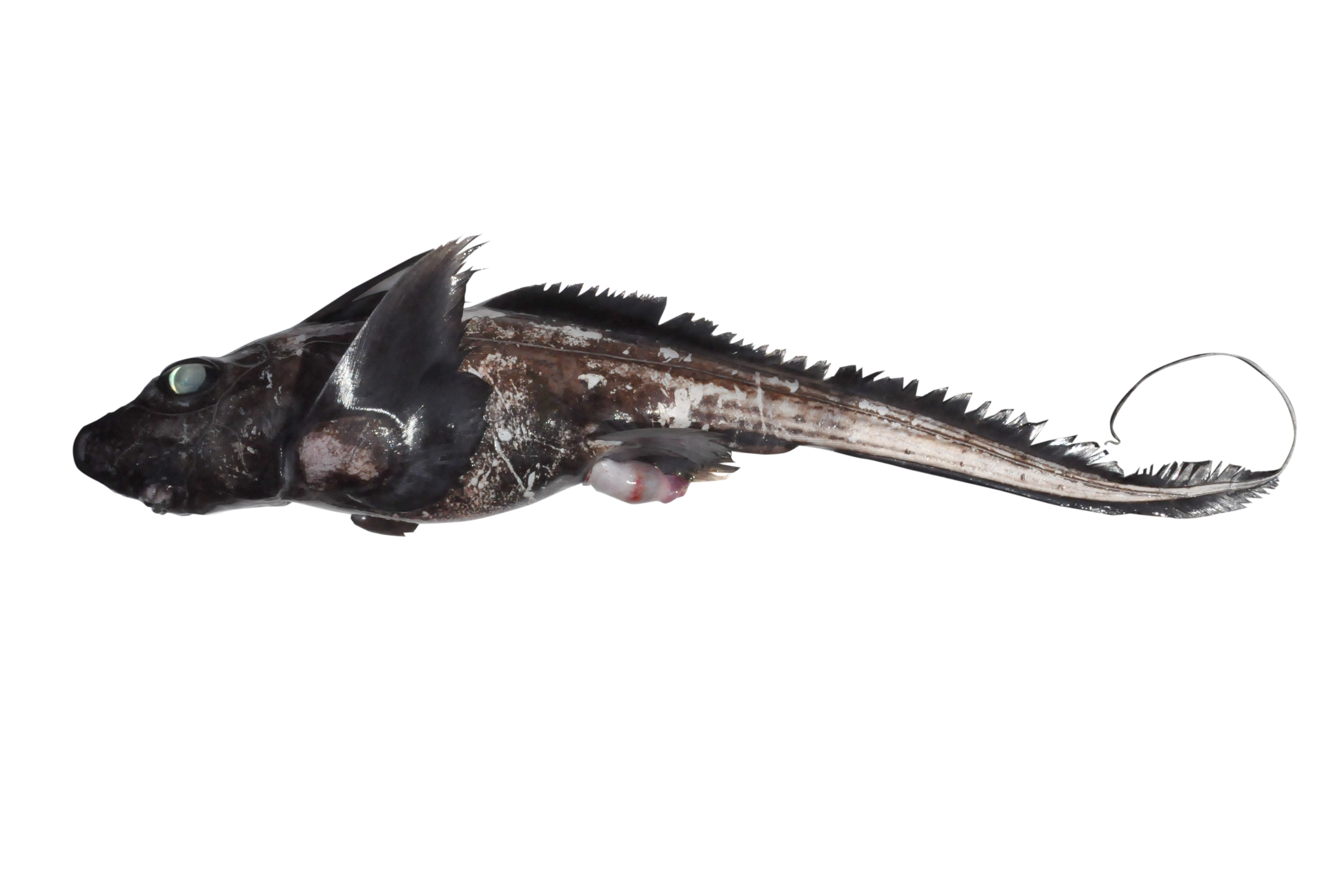
Hydrolagus africanus from off southwest coast of India, Arabian sea, an image from survey of FORV Sagar Sampada in 2014
