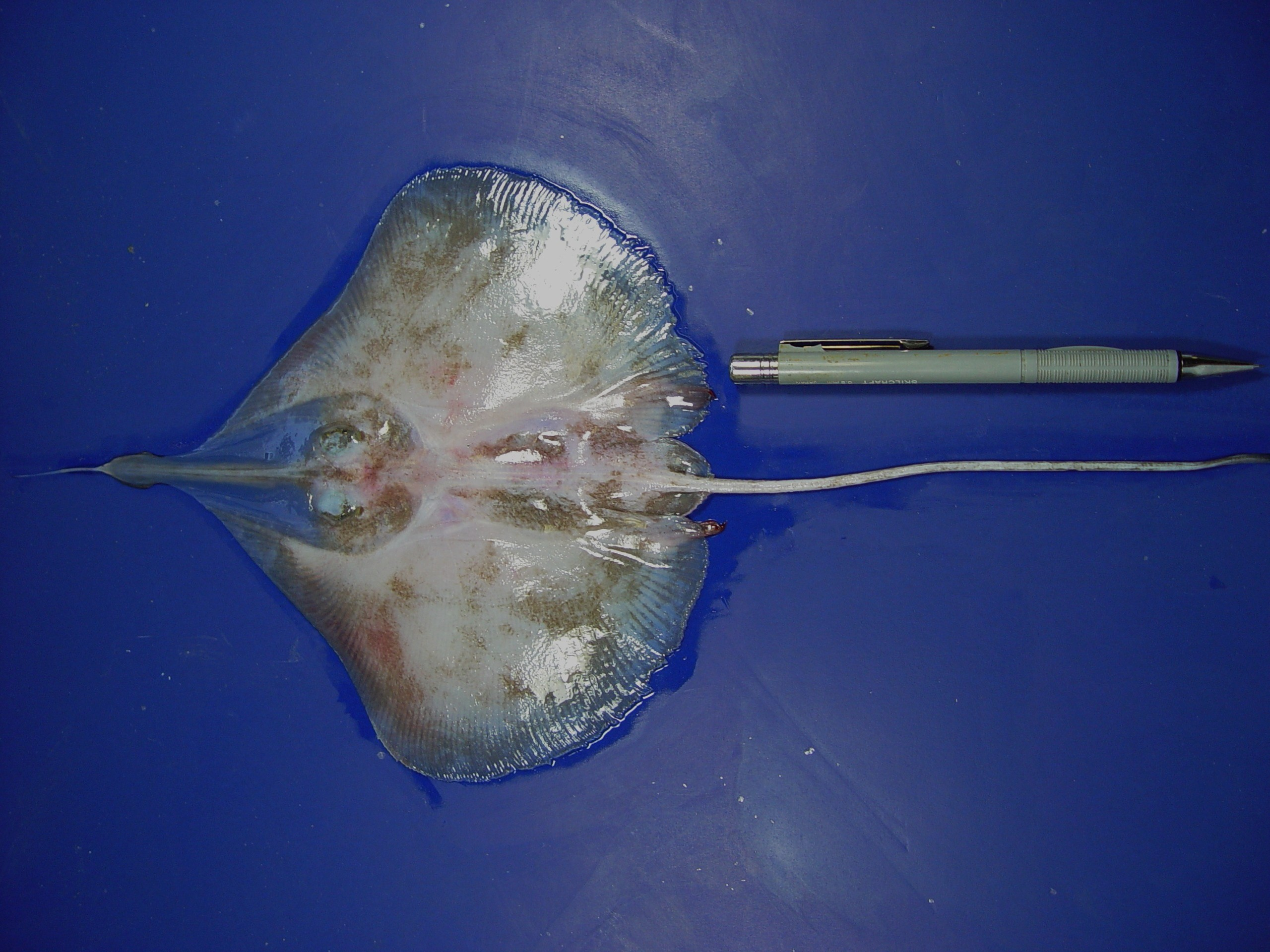
- Leaf-nose leg skate

Scientific classification
- Kingdom: Animalia
- Phylum: Chordata
- Class: Chondrichthyes
- Subclass: Elasmobranchii
- Order: Rajiformes
- Family: Anacanthobatidae von Bonde & Swart, 1923

Genera
- see text

= Smooth skate =

Family of cartilaginous fishes

The Anacanthobatidae, the smooth skates or leg skates, are a family of skates found at depths below 200 m (660 ft) in the Indian, Pacific and Atlantic Oceans.

They lack the dorsal denticles (sharp, tooth-like scales) of other rays, hence their name, from Greek an- meaning "without", acantha meaning "thorn", and bathys meaning "deep".

They are bottom-dwelling fishes found on the continental slopes of tropical and subtropical waters.

== Genera ==
Anacanthobatidae contains the following genera:

- Anacanthobatis von Bonde & Swart, 1923
- Indobatis Weigmann, Stehmann & Thiel, 2014
- Schroederobatis Hulley, 1973
- Sinobatis Hulley, 1973
- Springeria Bigelow & Schroeder, 1951
