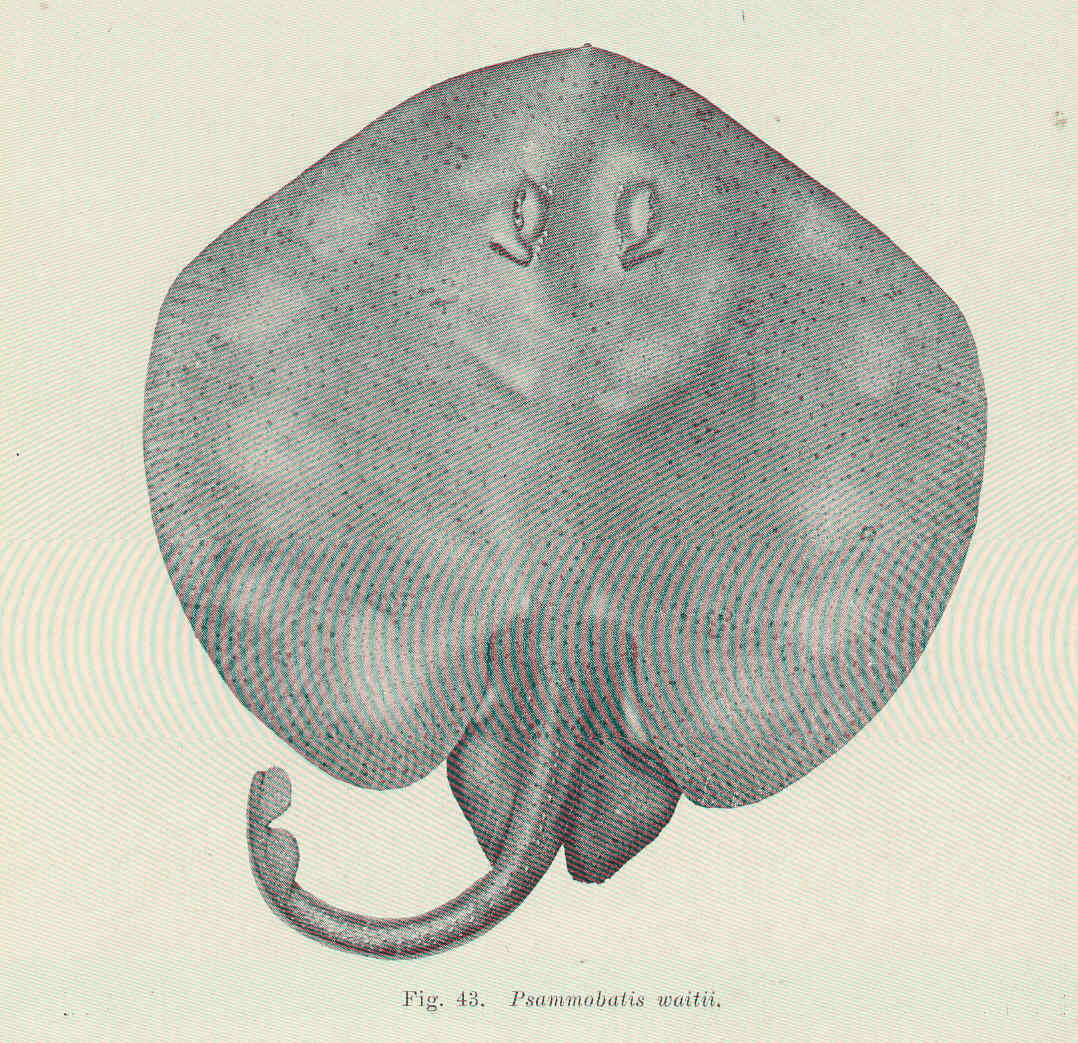
- Irolita waitii

Scientific classification
- Kingdom: Animalia
- Phylum: Chordata
- Class: Chondrichthyes
- Subclass: Elasmobranchii
- Order: Rajiformes
- Family: Arhynchobatidae
- Genus: Irolita; Whitley, 1931

= Irolita =

Genus of cartilaginous fishes

Irolita is a genus of softnose skates in the family Arhynchobatidae, commonly known as round skates. There are two species, both endemic to Australia, found over soft bottoms on the outer continental shelves and upper continental slopes, at depths of 50–200 m for the southern round skate and 142–209 m for the western round skate. The distributions of the two species do not overlap.

== Species ==
- Irolita waitii McCulloch, 1911 (southern round skate)
- Irolita westraliensis Last & Gledhill, 2008 (western round skate)

== Description ==
Both species are unique amongst Australian skates in having a smooth, almost circular heart-shaped pectoral fin disc. The head is short, with a small fleshy process at the tip of the snout and large spiracles behind the eyes. The nasal flaps are merged into a well-developed, bilobed nasal curtain forward of the mouth. The jaws are slightly arched with the upper teeth exposed. The teeth are sexually dimorphic; those of adult males are spear-shaped with long, sharp cusps, while those of females and juveniles are plate-like with short posterior cusps. The pelvic fins are deeply incised, with the anterior lobe moderately long and slender and the posterior lobe broadly rounded. The tail is narrow, tapering gradually to a very slender tip and bearing two small dorsal fins near the end. The caudal fin is reduced to minute lobes. Males have alar thorns near the pectoral fin tips and the tail is covered with irregular rows of small recurved thorns.
