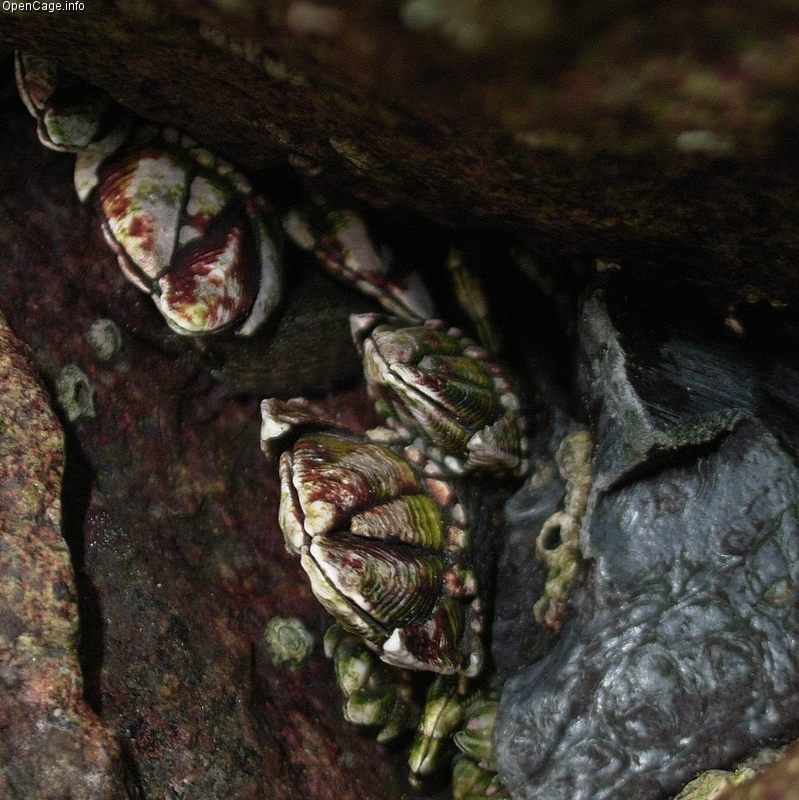

Scientific classification
- Kingdom: Animalia
- Phylum: Arthropoda
- Class: Thecostraca
- Subclass: Cirripedia
- Order: Pollicipedomorpha
- Family: Pollicipedidae
- Genus: Capitulum; Gray, 1825
- Species: C. mitella

Binomial name
- Capitulum mitella (Linnaeus, 1758)

Synonyms
- Capitulum mitella Foster, 1980; Lepas mitella Linnaeus, 1758; Mitella mitella Pilsbry, 1907; Pollicipes mitella Sowerby, 1833

= Capitulum mitella =

Species of barnacle

Capitulum is a monotypic genus of sessile marine stalked barnacles. Capitulum mitella is the only species in the genus. It is commonly known as the Japanese goose barnacle or kamenote and is found on rocky shores in the Indo-Pacific region.

== Description ==
Capitulum mitella has a short leathery stalk or peduncle supporting an upper region or capitulum, the whole being up to 5 cm (2 in) long. The peduncle is muscular and contractile and its surface is covered with fine scales. The capitulum is protected by eight large, sheathing scales and a ring of about twenty tiny scales surround the joint of capitulum and peduncle. Inside these scales is a cavity containing the head and thorax of the animal and its appendages.

== Distribution and habitat ==
Capitulum mitella occurs in the South China Sea and the East China Sea. It is found attached to rocks in the lower part of the intertidal zone in areas with strong currents. It typically occurs crowded with others in cracks and grooves on otherwise smooth rocky surfaces. The barnacle Tetraclita squamosa often occurs in the same locations and grows alongside it, and the primitive barnacle Ibla cumingi may grow in between or on the larger capitulum plates.

== Biology ==
When under water, Capitulum mitella extends its five hind pairs of thoracic legs and spreads them out in the current like a net. It uses the front pair of legs to manipulate the objects it catches and move them into its mouth. Its diet mainly consists of zooplankton.

Capitulum mitella is a simultaneous hermaphrodite. Each barnacle is capable of fertilising other nearby individuals by transmitting sperm through a long, fine tube and also of brooding its own eggs in its mantle cavity. When the eggs hatch, the larvae are released into the sea. They have six naupliar stages during which food reserves are built up and one non-feeding cyprid stage which seeks out a suitable hard surface on which to settle. It then fix itself in place, undergoes metamorphosis and becomes a sessile juvenile.

In Hong Kong harbour, where this barnacle can be found growing on pilings, it often has a nemertean worm (Nemertopsis quadripunctatus) living inside its mantle cavity and feeding on the eggs being brooded there. The worm can be 8 cm (3 in) long but only 1 mm (0.04 in) in diameter.

== Uses ==
Capitulum mitella is one of about a dozen species of goose barnacle that are gathered commercially and eaten by humans. These barnacles are a luxury food item in Japan, Taiwan, Korea and China.
