= List of taxa described by Charles Darwin =

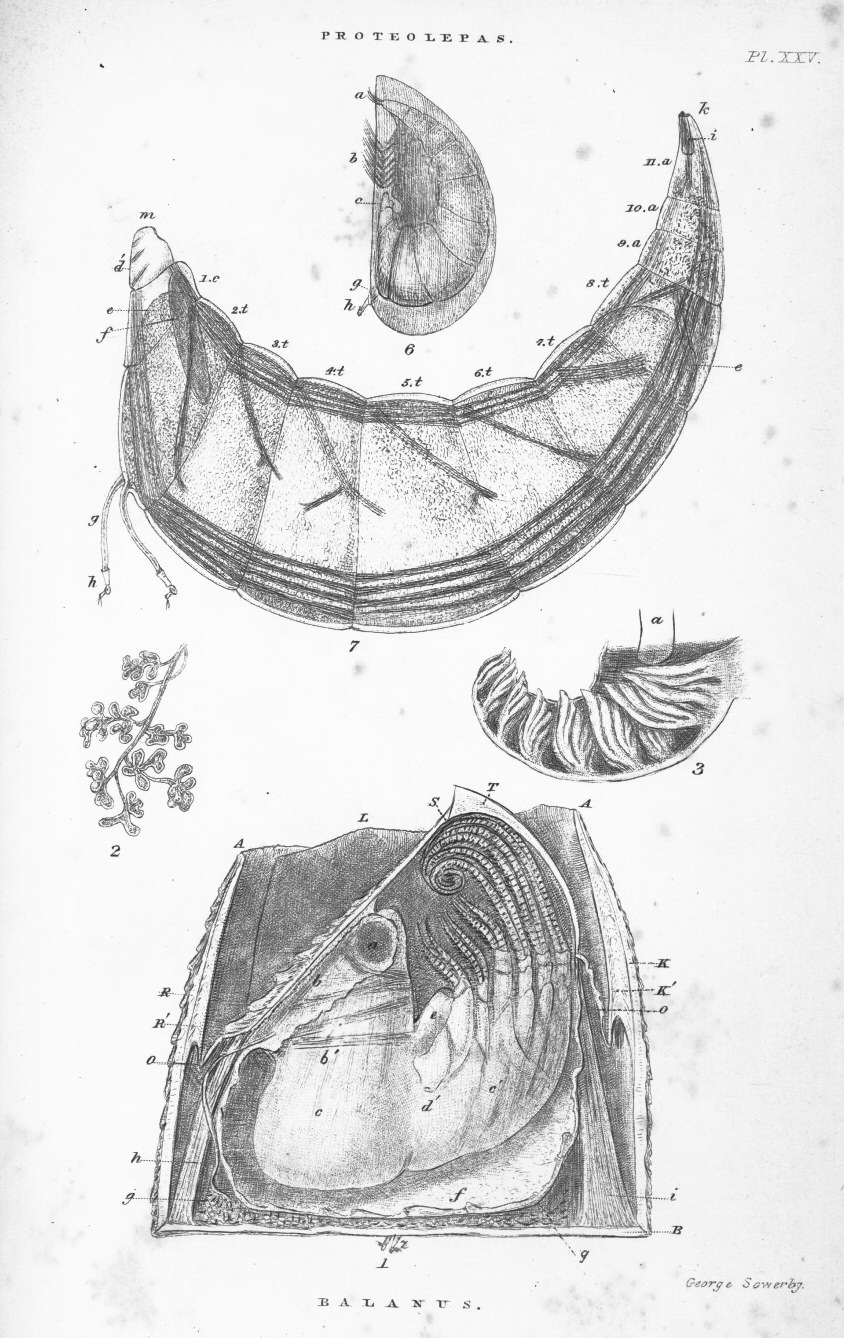
A plate from Charles Darwin's Monograph on the Cirripedia, 1854, engraved by George Brettingham Sowerby, Jr.

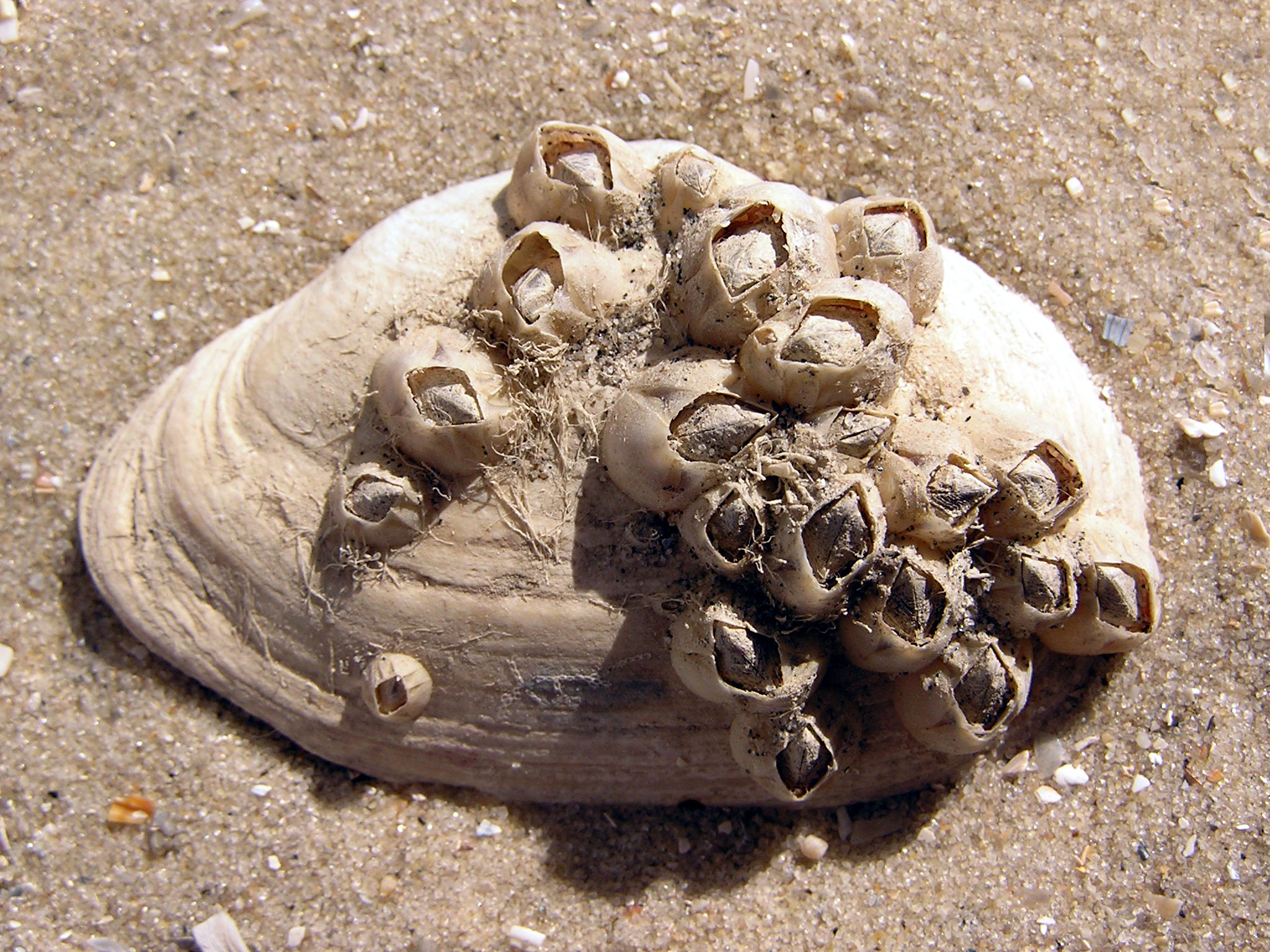
The bay barnacle, Balanus improvisus, described by Charles Darwin, on a shell of the sand gaper clam Mya arenaria

This is a list of taxa described by Charles Darwin. Many of them are barnacles from his study of that group.

- Balanus improvisus, bay barnacle
- Colorhamphus parvirostris, Patagonian tyrant
- Acasta cyathus, sponge barnacle
- Balanus nubilus, giant barnacle
- Balanus glandula, acorn barnacle
- Amphibalanus amphitrite, striped barnacle
- Elminius modestus, New Zealand barnacle
- Notomegabalanus decorus
- Megabalanus occator
- Lepas australis
- Tetraclita rubescens
- Coronula reginae
- Anelasma squalicola
- Heteralepas cornuta
- Tetraclita serrata
- Nobia conjugatum
- Rostratoverruca nexa
- Fistulobalanus pallidus
- Wanella milleporae
- Balanus trigonus
- Nesochthamalus intertextus
- Temnaspis fissum
- Balanus vestitus
- Balanus decorus
- Balanus (genus), barnacles
- Megabalanus stultus
- Octolasmis lowei
- Acasta fenestrata
- Balanus venustus
- Membranobalanus declivis
- Chthamalus fragilis
- Poecilasma kaempferi
- Megabalanus coccopoma, titan acorn barnacle
- Megabalanus decorus
- Megabalanus crispatus
- Acasta purpurata
- Euraphia intertexta
- Amphibalanus cirratus
- Euacasta sporillus
- Megabalanus vinaceus
- Megabalanus vesiculosus
- Epopella eosimplex
- Balanus poecilus
- Armatobalanus allium
- Centrostomum incisum (Platyhelminth)
- Savignium dentatum
- Coronula barbara
- Leptoplana notabilis
- Leptoplana formosa
- Pachylasma auranticacum
