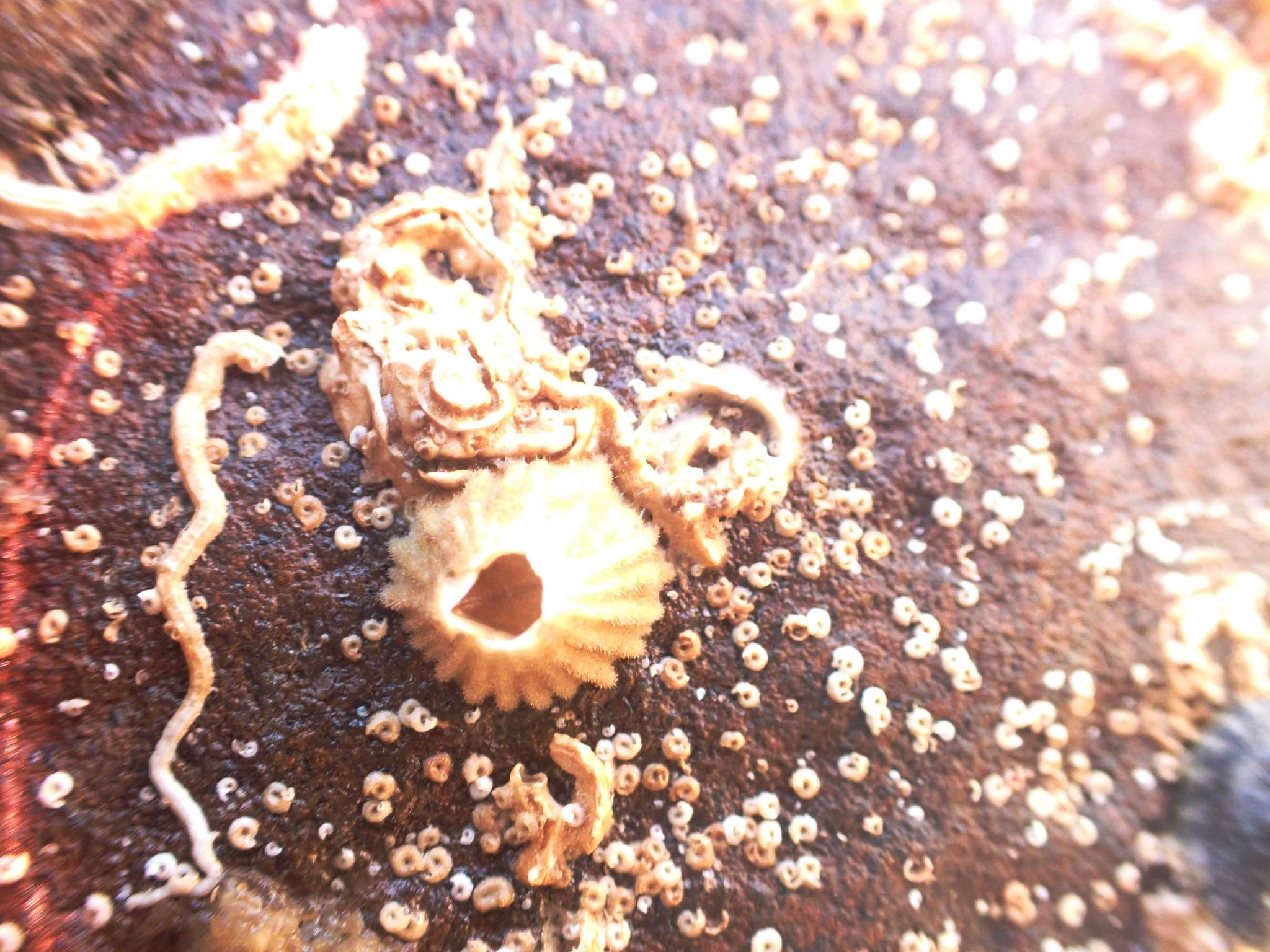
- Epopella simplex, Tasmania, Australia

Scientific classification
- Kingdom: Animalia
- Phylum: Arthropoda
- Class: Thecostraca
- Subclass: Cirripedia
- Order: Balanomorpha
- Family: Tetraclitidae
- Genus: Epopella
- Species: E. simplex

Binomial name
- Epopella simplex (Darwin, 1854)

= Epopella simplex =

Species of barnacle

Epopella simplex is a species of barnacle in the family Tetraclitidae native to southern Australia.

== Distribution and habitat ==
E. simplex is native to southern Australia, from New South Wales in the east to Western Australia in the west and south to Tasmania. It inhabits exposed rocky shores in the low intertidal zone, growing in sheltered areas at depths of up to 9 m (30 ft). It sometimes grows attached to other barnacle species but is not known to grow as a fouling species that attaches to man-made objects such as boat hulls.

== Description ==
E. simplex is a conical barnacle growing up to 20 mm (0.79 in) wide and 12 mm (0.47 in) tall with four ribbed outer shell plates and a pentagonal opening. Mature individuals are pink, but the outer plates of younger animals are grey-white with pink tips.
