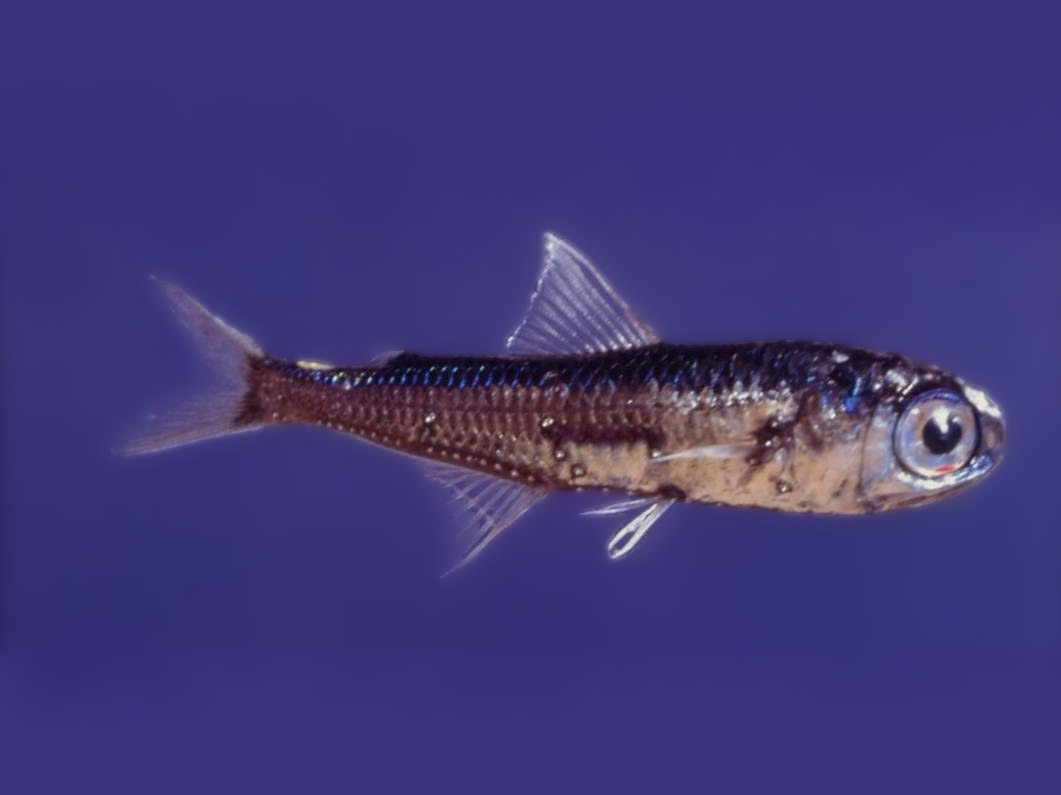
- Myctophum punctatum

Scientific classification
- Kingdom: Animalia
- Phylum: Chordata
- Class: Actinopterygii
- Division: Teleostei
- Order: Myctophiformes
- Family: Myctophidae
- Genus: Myctophum; Rafinesque, 1810

Species
- See text.

= Myctophum =

Myctophum Temporal range: Late Miocene to Present

Genus of fishes

Myctophum is a genus of lanternfishes, some species of which, such as M. punctatum, are noted for having the Stylophthalmine trait in their larval form.

== Species ==
There are currently 9 recognized species in this genus:

- Myctophum affine (Lütken, 1892) (Metallic lantern fish)
- Myctophum aurolaternatum Garman, 1899 (Golden lanternfish)
- Myctophum fissunovi Becker & Borodulina, 1971
- Myctophum imperceptum Becker & Borodulina, 1971
- Myctophum indicum (F. Day, 1877) (Incertae sedis)
- Myctophum lunatum Becker & Borodulina, 1978
- †Myctophum luzonicum Mediodia & Lin in Mediodia, 2026
- Myctophum nitidulum Garman, 1899 (Pearly lanternfish)
- Myctophum ovcharovi Tsarin, 1993
- Myctophum punctatum Rafinesque, 1810 (Spotted lanternfish); type species

== See also ==
- Stylophthalmus
