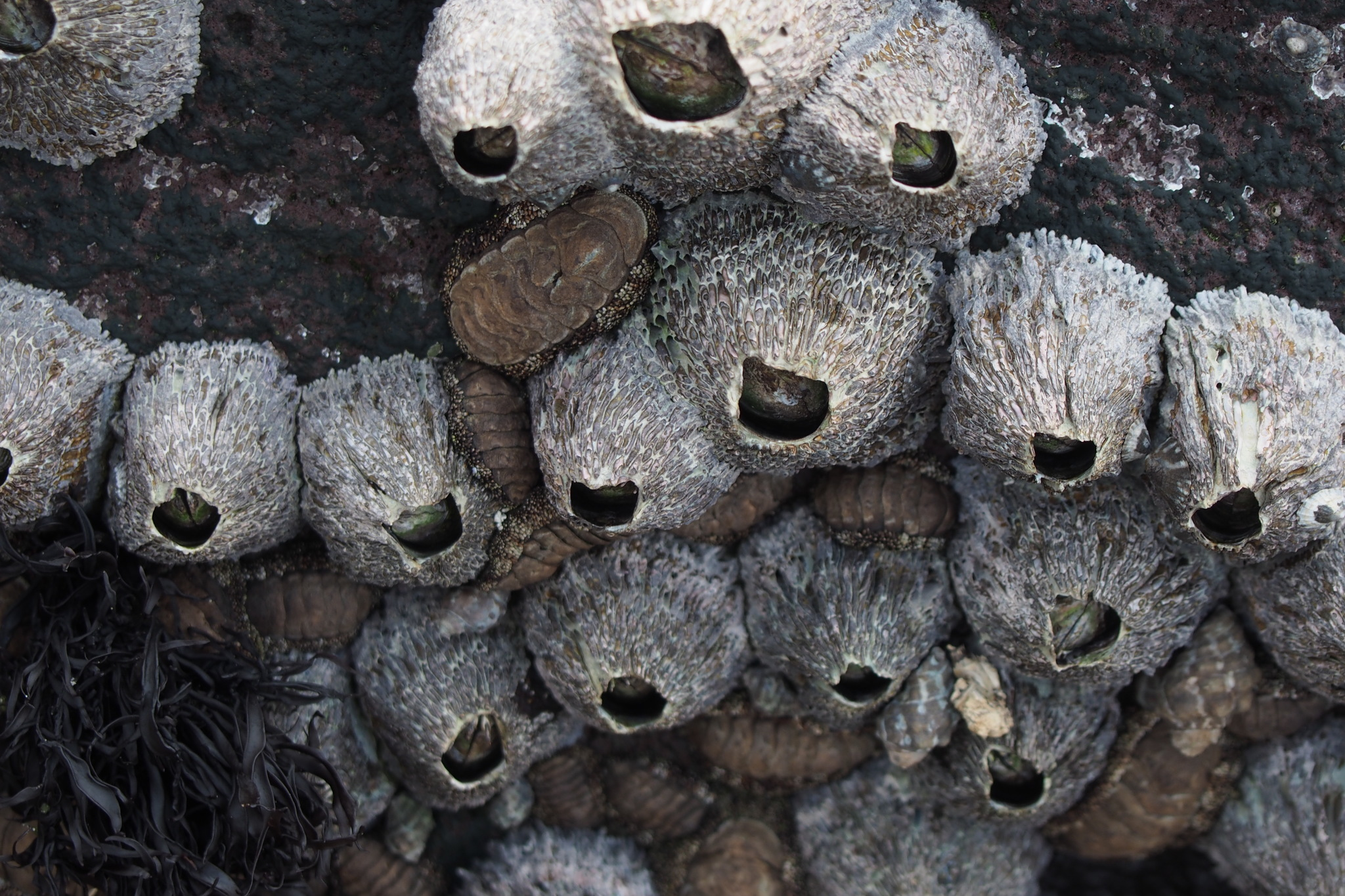
- Tetraclita japonica, Japanese Volcano Barnacle, Kanagawa, Japan

Scientific classification
- Kingdom: Animalia
- Phylum: Arthropoda
- Clade: Pancrustacea
- Class: Thecostraca
- Subclass: Cirripedia
- Order: Balanomorpha
- Family: Tetraclitidae
- Genus: Tetraclita
- Species: T. japonica

Binomial name
- Tetraclita japonica (Pilsbry, 1916)

= Tetraclita japonica =

Species of barnacle

Tetraclita japonica, the Japanese volcano barnacle, Kurofujitsubo, is a species of symmetrical sessile barnacle in the family Tetraclitidae.

== Subspecies ==
Tetraclita japonica has two subspecies that were formerly described as separate species. Similarities in their nuclear and mitochondrial DNA lead to T. formosana merging with T. Japonica. The subspecies are as follows:

- Tetraclita japonica formosana (Hiro, 1939)
- Tetraclita japonica japonica (Pilsbry, 1916)
