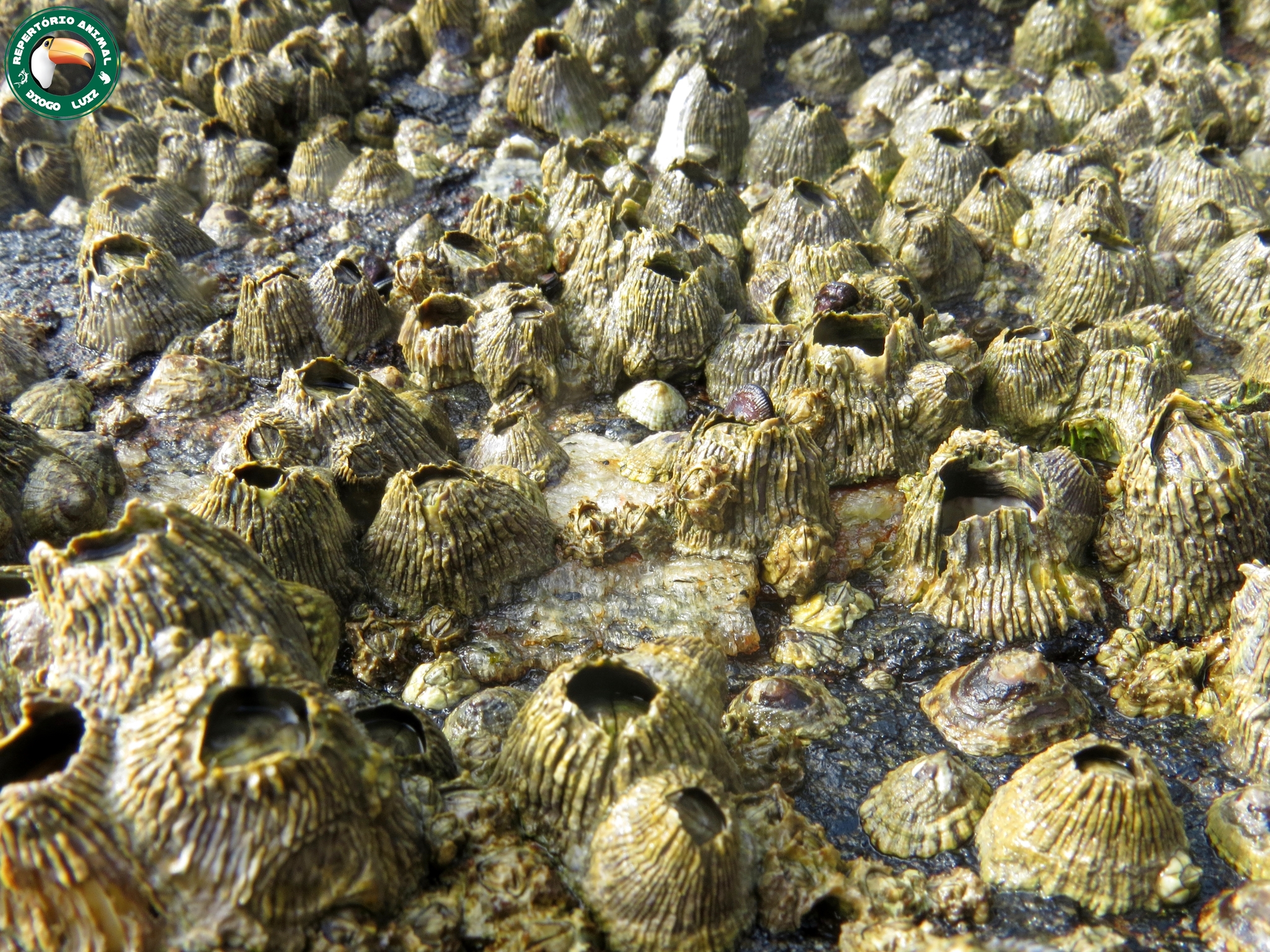
- Tetraclita stalactifera Ribbed Barnacle, Brazil

Scientific classification
- Kingdom: Animalia
- Phylum: Arthropoda
- Class: Thecostraca
- Subclass: Cirripedia
- Order: Balanomorpha
- Family: Tetraclitidae
- Genus: Tetraclita
- Species: T. stalactifera

Binomial name
- Tetraclita stalactifera (Lamarck, 1818)

= Tetraclita stalactifera =

Species of barnacle

Tetraclita stalactifera, the ribbed barnacle, is a species of symmetrical sessile barnacle in the family Tetraclitidae. It is found in the western Atlantic Ocean.

== Subspecies ==
These subspecies belong to the species Tetraclita stalactifera:

- Tetraclita stalactifera confinis Pilsbry, 1916
- Tetraclita stalactifera stalactifera (Lamarck, 1818)
