= Symbolophorus kreffti =

Scientific classification
- Domain: Eukaryota
- Kingdom: Animalia
- Phylum: Chordata
- Class: Actinopterygii
- Order: Myctophiformes
- Family: Myctophidae
- Genus: Symbolophorus
- Species: S. kreffti

Binomial name
- Symbolophorus kreffti Hulley, 1981

Species of fish

Symbolophorus kreffti is a species of fish in the family Myctophidae.

== Etymology ==
The fish is named in honor of Gerhard Krefft (1912-1993) of the Institut für Seefischerei in Hamburg, he being the first to recognize the specimens of Symbolophorus from near the Cape Verde Islands might be specifically distinct from another species Symbolophorus veranyi.
