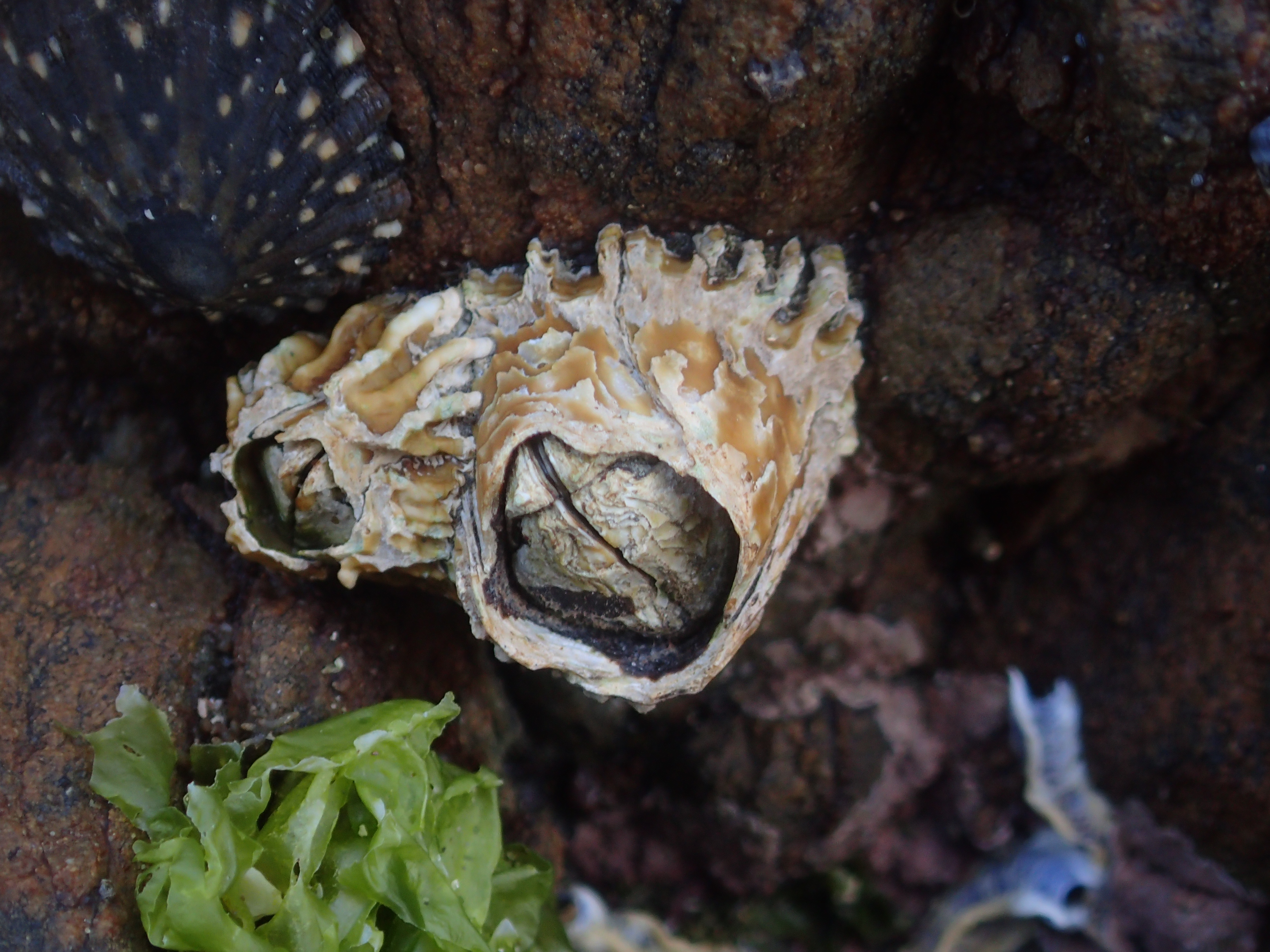
- Epopella plicata, New Zealand

Scientific classification
- Kingdom: Animalia
- Phylum: Arthropoda
- Class: Thecostraca
- Subclass: Cirripedia
- Order: Balanomorpha
- Family: Tetraclitidae
- Genus: Epopella
- Species: E. plicata

Binomial name
- Epopella plicata (Gray, 1843)

= Epopella plicata =

Species of barnacle

Epopella plicata is a species of symmetrical sessile barnacle in the family Tetraclitidae. It is found in New Zealand.
