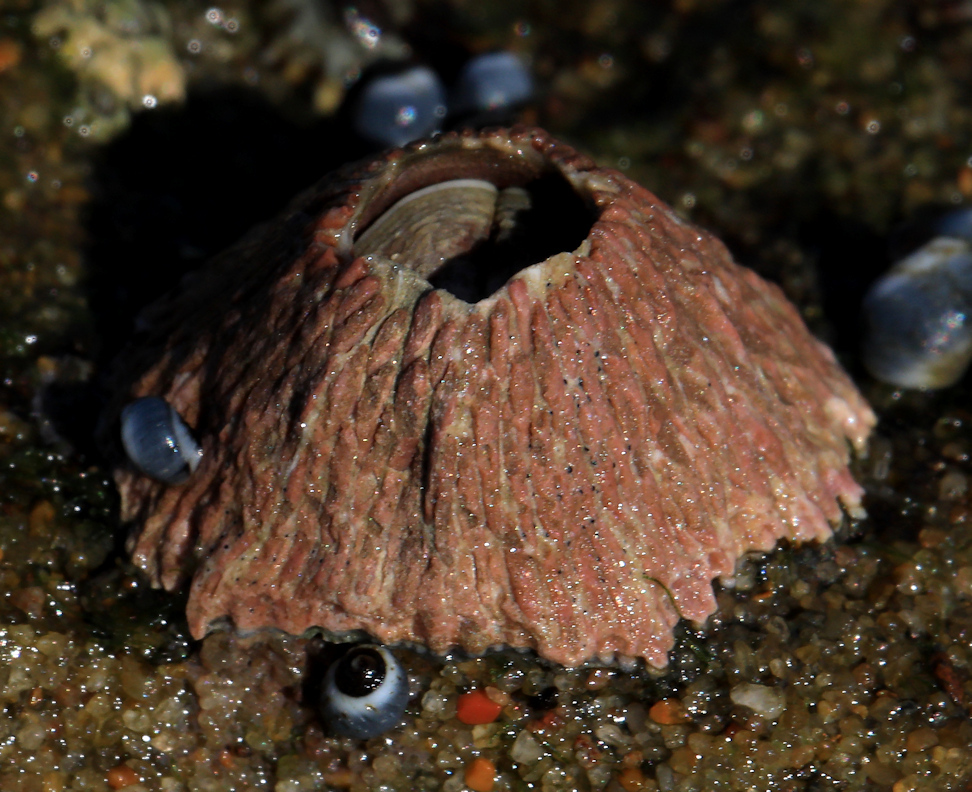
- Tetraclita rufotincta, South Africa

Scientific classification
- Kingdom: Animalia
- Phylum: Arthropoda
- Class: Thecostraca
- Subclass: Cirripedia
- Order: Balanomorpha
- Family: Tetraclitidae
- Genus: Tetraclita
- Species: T. rufotincta

Binomial name
- Tetraclita rufotincta Pilsbry, 1916

= Tetraclita rufotincta =

Species of barnacle

Tetraclita rufotincta is a species of symmetrical sessile barnacle in the family Tetraclitidae.
