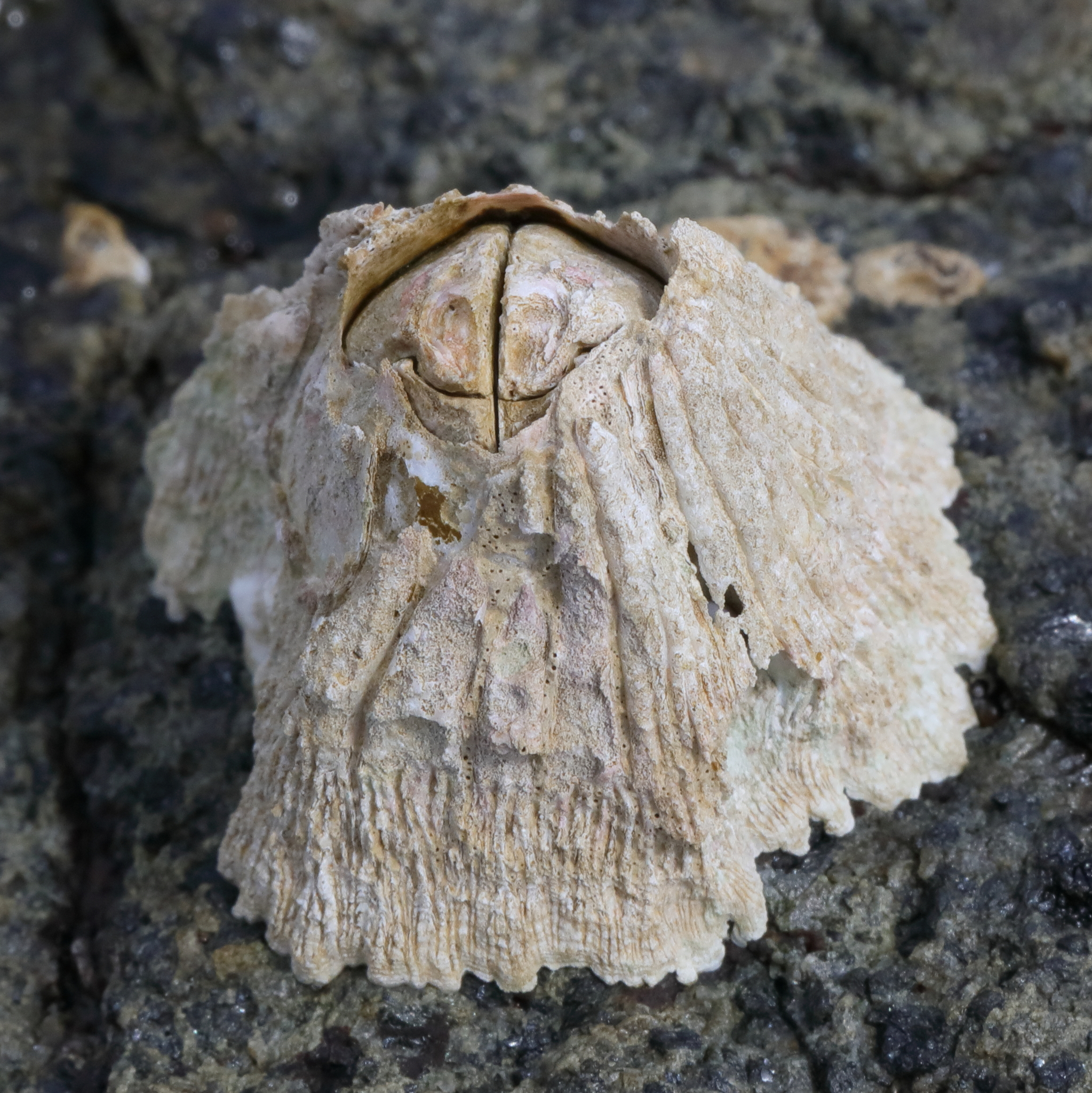
- at Bawley Point, Australia

Scientific classification
- Kingdom: Animalia
- Phylum: Arthropoda
- Clade: Pancrustacea
- Class: Thecostraca
- Subclass: Cirripedia
- Order: Balanomorpha
- Family: Tetraclitidae
- Genus: Tesseropora
- Species: T. rosea

Binomial name
- Tesseropora rosea Krauss 1848

Synonyms
- Conia rosea Krauss, 1848; Tetraclita rosea Darwin, 1854

= Tesseropora rosea =

Species of barnacle

Tesseropora rosea, the rose barnacle, is a species of barnacle found in Australia, South Africa, and Indonesia, where they inhabit exposed, wave-broken rocks and littoral areas. They feed primarily on zooplankton and extend their cirri only when the current is strong. Their shells, usually around 2 centimetres (0.79 in) in diameter, are made of four plates and turn pink as they age.

== Description ==
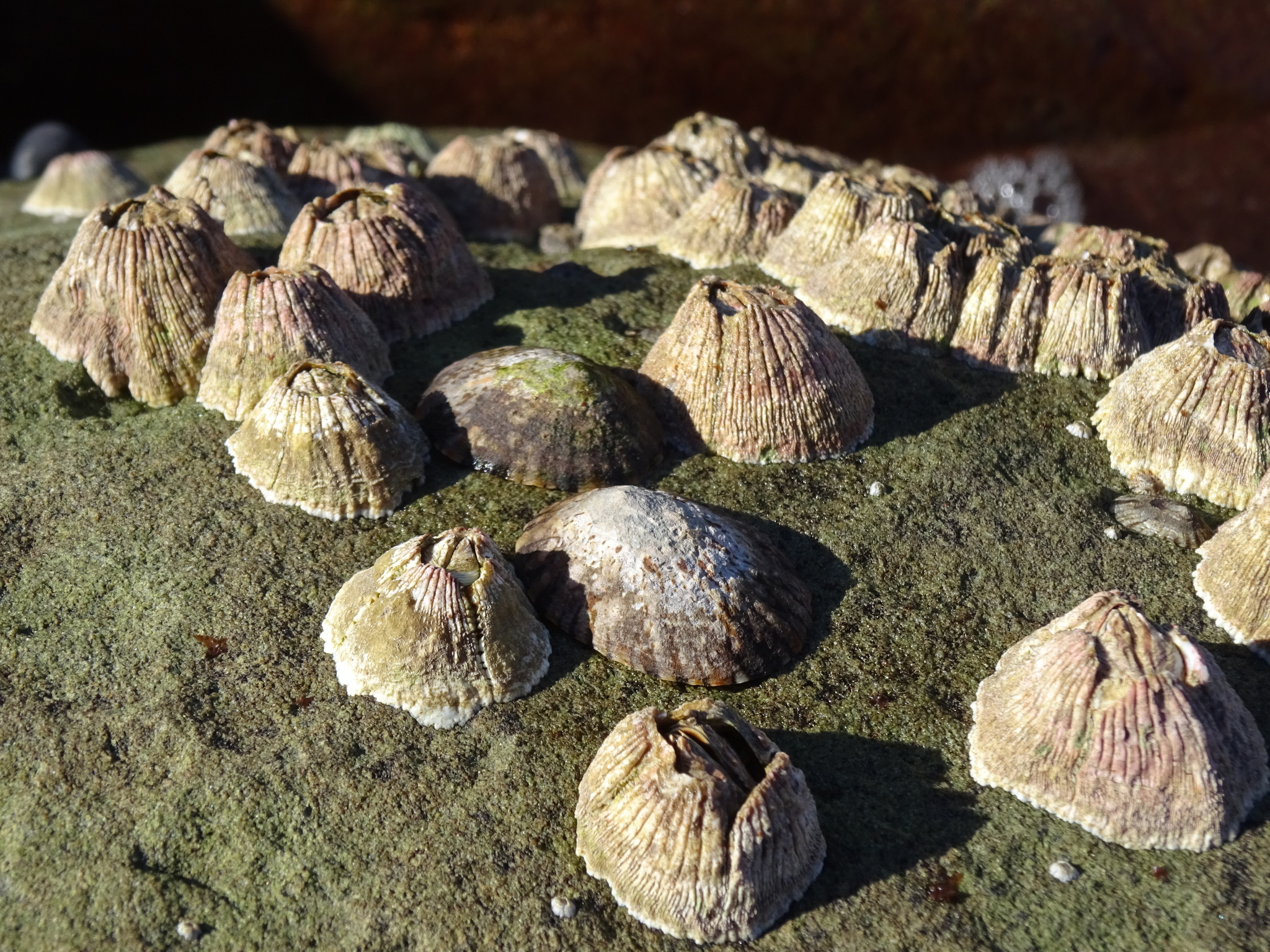
A cluster of rose barnacles

Rose barnacles have a steep, conical shell with an outer wall made up of four plates. The calcareous shell base is usually around 1.9 centimetres (0.75 in) in diameter but may exceed 2.5 centimetres (0.98 in); the barnacles typically grow 1.3 centimetres (0.51 in) tall. The central triangle-shaped portions of these plates are called parietes – which in this species have each a single row of large, square pores or tubes. The pores are inside the parietes and can only be seen when the barnacle is dead, detached, and then viewed from below. The colour of the shell among younger barnacles is pale grey, but the shell pinkens as it ages. The shell is covered with purplish lines. The opened top part of the barnacle shell, which connects to the outside, is called the orifice. It can be closed by the operculum, which comprises two small shells, known as the tergum and the scutum, divided by a small linear opening; this acts as something of a lid for the barnacle. The orifice of rose barnacles is usually pentagonal, but is often much eroded, and may appear quadrilateral or triangular. Similarly, the outsides of the barnacles' opercular valves often face erosion. Both valves are thick and solid, and have visible ridges and furrows on them. The size of the orifice ranges from 2.3 to 7.8 mm (0.091 to 0.307 in) across.

== Habitat and distribution ==
The barnacles' habitat is exposed rocky shores, from high tide levels to a depth of 58 metres; the barnacles are able to tolerate strong wave activity. They attach to stones and shells. In Australia, the rose barnacle is common in Sydney Harbour and is abundant on the east coast in New South Wales and Queensland, between the 19th and 38th parallels south, as well as around Lord Howe Island, the isolated Kermadecs. On the continent's west coast, it is found in the Fremantle area and from Albany, where it may have been introduced through ballast water transfer. The species, however, was originally described from South Africa's Algoa Bay. In Indonesia, they are known from the islands of Ambon and Saparua.

== Diet ==
Rose barnacles feed on zooplankton, mostly small crustaceans such as copepods, but also barnacle nauplii, diatoms, and algae. They extend and spread their cirri to feed only during periods of strong current, and thus cannot not live in calm-water areas.
