= Stylophthalmus =

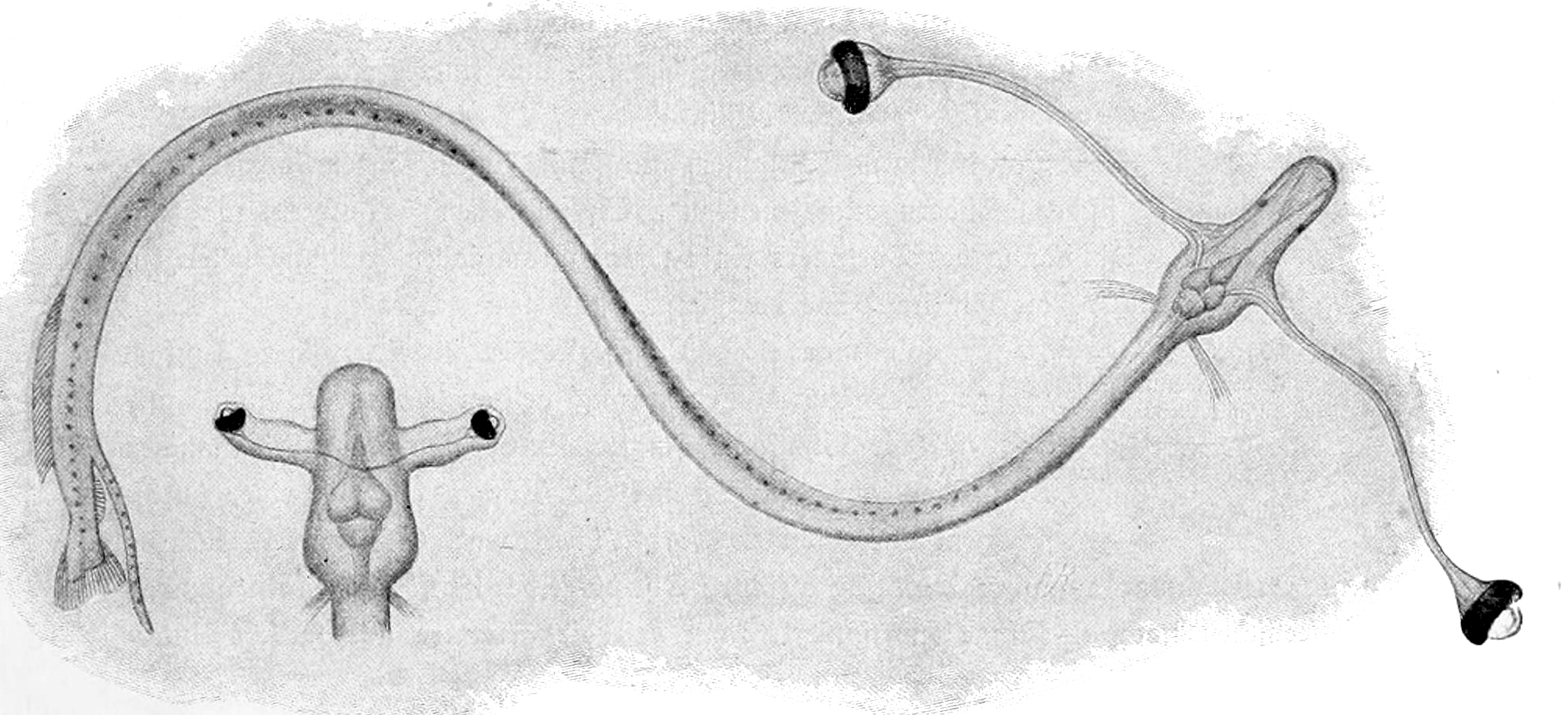
Stylophthalmus paradoxus, now recognized as the larval form of Idiacanthus fasciola

Stylophthalmus (meaning 'stem-eye') was a name used for what was previously believed to be a genus of fish with eyes perched upon periscopic stalks, known in some cases to be almost one third of the length of the animal's actual body. It is now recognised that all species in this genus are the fish larvae of already named, distantly related fish in the orders Stomiiformes and Myctophiformes which may have developed this same trait as a result of convergent evolution. Thus, Stylophthalmus is an invalid name.

== Species ==
- Stylophthalmus lobiancoi, Mazzarelli, 1909, now recognised as a junior synonym of Myctophum punctatum, Rafinesque, 1810
- Stylophthalmus mediterraneus, Mazzarelli, 1810, now recognised as a junior synonym of Symbolophorus veranyi, Moreau, 1888
- Stylophthalmus paradoxus, Brauer, 1902, now recognised as a junior synonym of Idiacanthus fasciola, Peters, 1877
