= Symbolophorus californiensis =

Scientific classification
- Kingdom: Animalia
- Phylum: Chordata
- Class: Actinopterygii
- Order: Myctophiformes
- Family: Myctophidae
- Genus: Symbolophorus
- Species: S. californiensis

Binomial name
- Symbolophorus californiensis (C. H. Eigenmann & R. S. Eigenmann, 1889)

Species of fish

Symbolophorus californiensis is a species of fish in the family Myctophidae.
