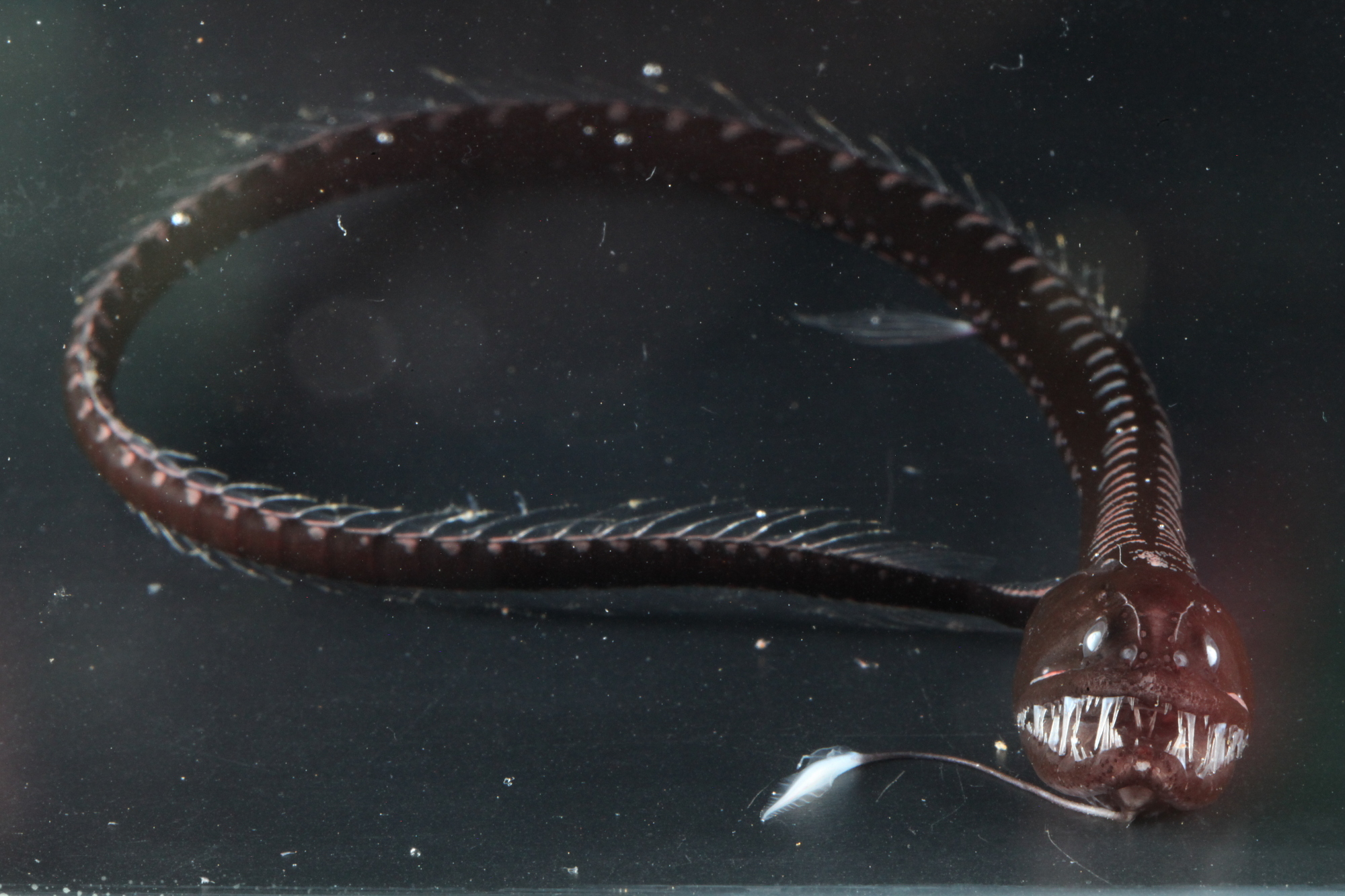
- Full body view of Idiacanthus antrostomus

Conservation status
- Least Concern (IUCN 3.1)

Scientific classification
- Kingdom: Animalia
- Phylum: Chordata
- Class: Actinopterygii
- Division: Teleostei
- Order: Stomiiformes
- Family: Stomiidae
- Genus: Idiacanthus
- Species: I. antrostomus

Binomial name
- Idiacanthus antrostomus Gilbert, 1890

= Idiacanthus antrostomus =

Species of fish

Idiacanthus antrostomus, also known as the Pacific blackdragon or black sea dragon, is a species of barbeled dragonfish (Stomiidae) inhabiting the Pacific Ocean.

== Overview ==
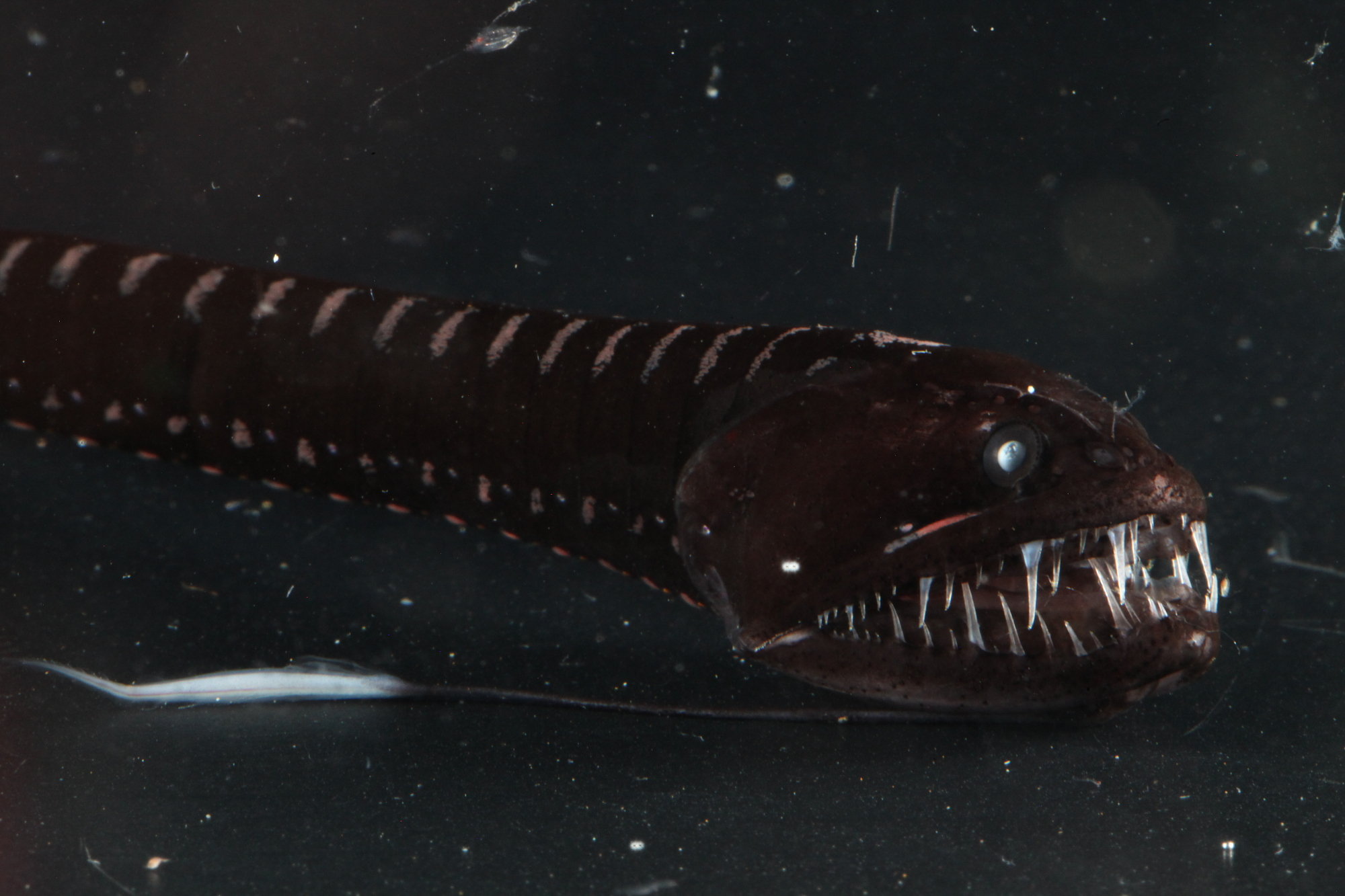
Side profile view of Idiacanthus antrostomus

This fish is noted for having ultrablack skin, similar to pigments like Vantablack, which is accomplished through tightly packed melanosomes that allow its skin to absorb 99.95% of common light wavelengths in its habitat. There are four groups of photophores located on the abdomen and extending down to the tail. The suborbital photophores are interpreted to support close-range prey detection due to their location on the body. Idiacanthus antrostomus also has a glowing chin barbell, which is thought to be used to attract prey.

Another notable feature of the Idiacanthus antrostomus is its straight notocordal sheath, a straight tube connecting the skull to the first vertebrae. In simple terms, the fish's head is not connected to the spine by a flexible joint.

== Habitat ==
It has been found at depths between 500 m (1,600 ft) and 2,000 m (6,600 ft) along the West Coast of the United States and in the Gulf of Mexico. The Pacific blackdragon also has been found to take part in DVM to feed on small fish and crustaceans.

== Sensory System ==
Idiacanthus antrostomus has an extensive Lateral line system composed of superficial neuromasts. It has 214 located on its head followed by an approximation of 2000 distributed along its elongated trunk. The number is an approximation as sampling was done on a specimen with slight epidermal damage. These allow it to sense vibrations and movement in the surrounding waters.

== Reproduction ==
Little is known about reproduction in Idiacanthus antrostomus, however, based on studies of other stomiids, it is likely an oviparous, gonochoristic batch spawner with asynchronous oocyte development. The fish is also thought to have high sexual dimorphism, with small larvoid males and larger females.
