= Symbolophorus boops =

Scientific classification
- Domain: Eukaryota
- Kingdom: Animalia
- Phylum: Chordata
- Class: Actinopterygii
- Order: Myctophiformes
- Family: Myctophidae
- Genus: Symbolophorus
- Species: S. boops

Binomial name
- Symbolophorus boops (Richardson, 1845)

Species of fish

Symbolophorus boops is a species of fish in the family Myctophidae.
