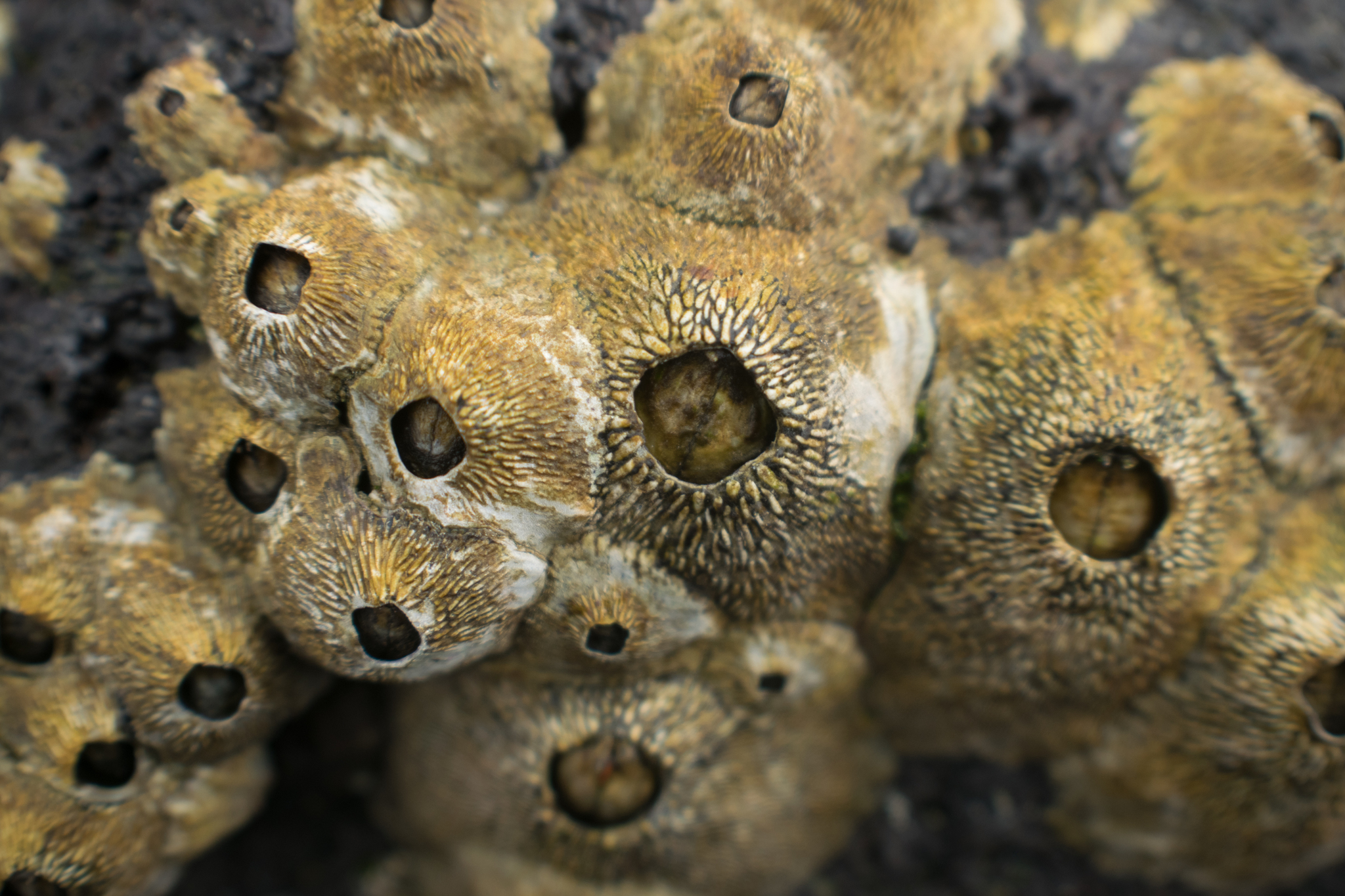
- Tetraclita squamosa, Green Volcano Barnacle, Galapagos Islands

Scientific classification
- Kingdom: Animalia
- Phylum: Arthropoda
- Class: Thecostraca
- Subclass: Cirripedia
- Order: Balanomorpha
- Family: Tetraclitidae
- Genus: Tetraclita
- Species: T. squamosa

Binomial name
- Tetraclita squamosa (Bruguière, 1789)

= Tetraclita squamosa =

Species of barnacle

Tetraclita squamosa, the green volcano barnacle, is a species of symmetrical sessile barnacle in the family Tetraclitidae.

== Subspecies ==
These subspecies belong to the species Tetraclita squamosa:

- Tetraclita squamosa milleporosa Pilsbry, 1916
- Tetraclita squamosa panamensis Pilsbry, 1916
- Tetraclita squamosa patellaris Darwin, 1854
- Tetraclita squamosa perfecta Nilsson-Cantell, 1931
- Tetraclita squamosa squamosa (Bruguière, 1789)
