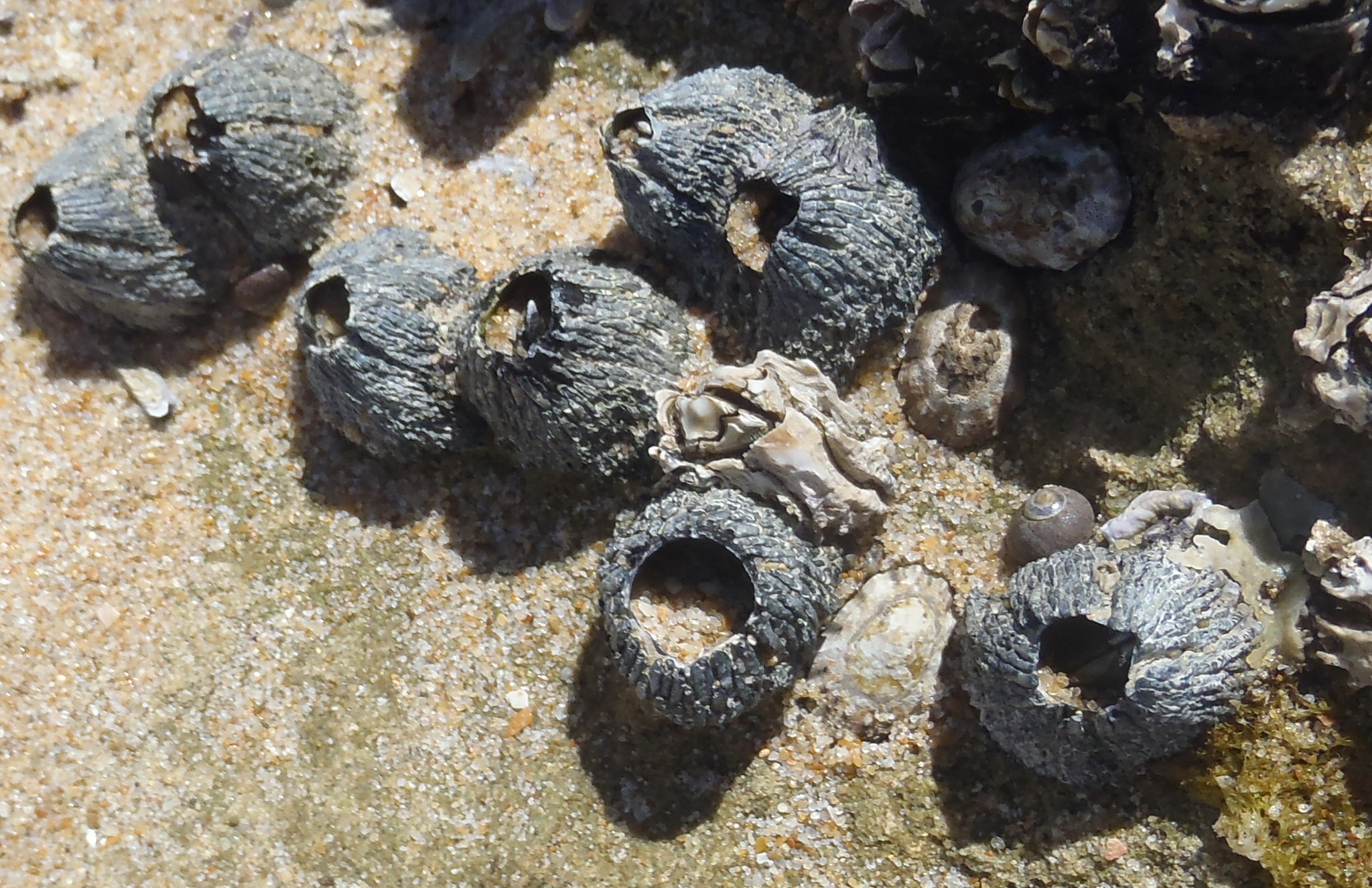
- Tetraclita serrata, Grey Volcano Barnacle, South Africa

Scientific classification
- Kingdom: Animalia
- Phylum: Arthropoda
- Class: Thecostraca
- Subclass: Cirripedia
- Order: Balanomorpha
- Family: Tetraclitidae
- Genus: Tetraclita
- Species: T. serrata

Binomial name
- Tetraclita serrata Darwin, 1854

= Tetraclita serrata =

Species of barnacle

Tetraclita serrata, the grey volcano barnacle, is a species of symmetrical sessile barnacle in the family Tetraclitidae. It is found in Africa.
