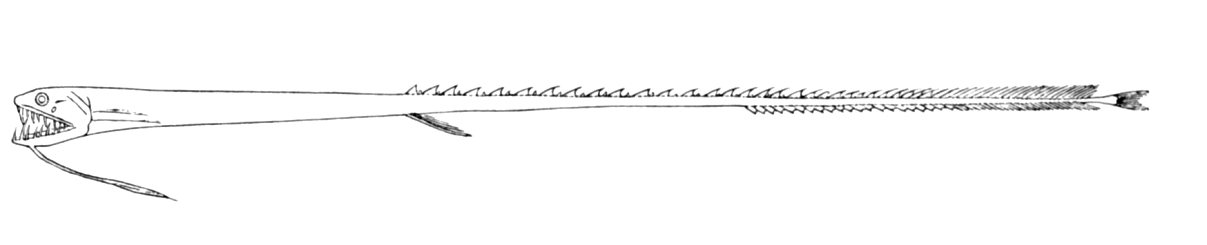
- Adult
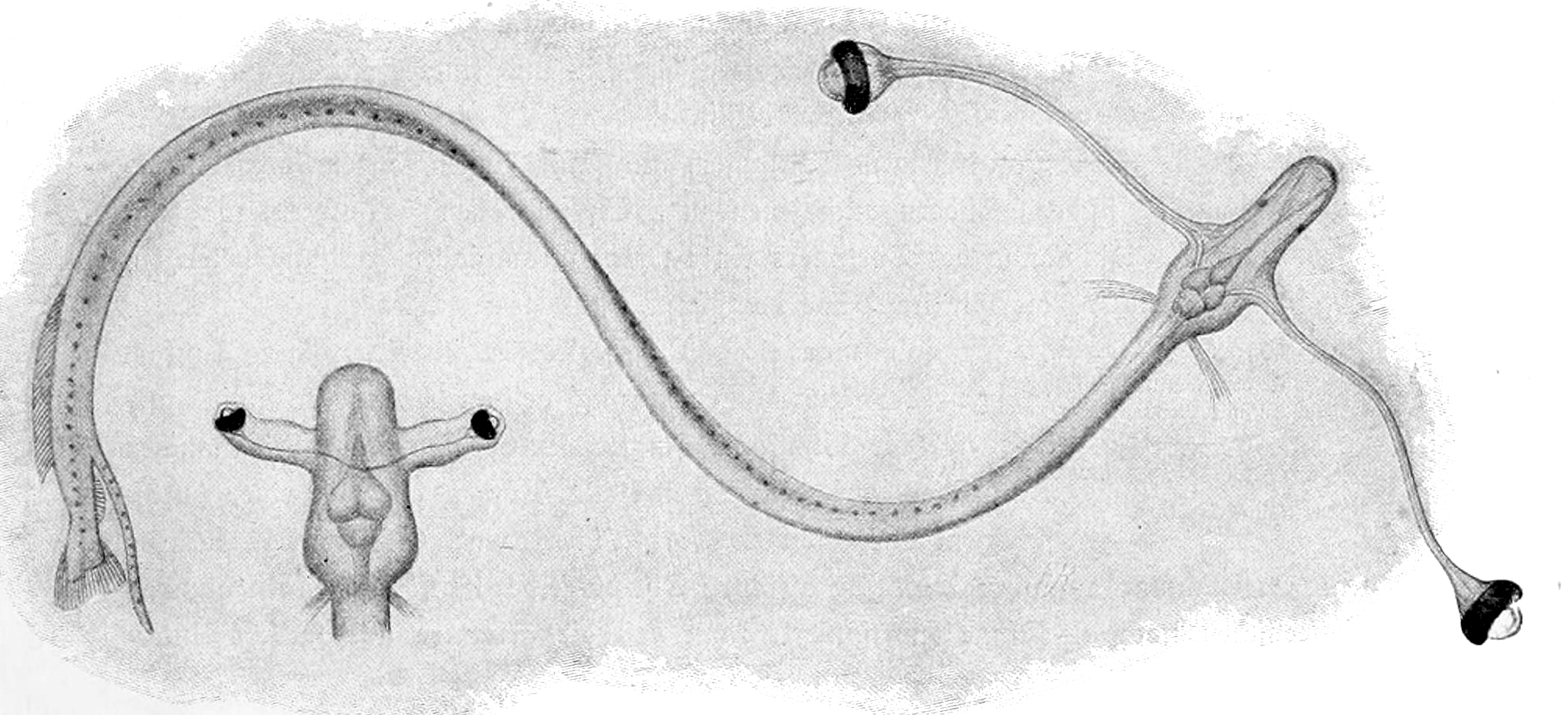
- Larval form

Conservation status
- Least Concern (IUCN 3.1)

Scientific classification
- Kingdom: Animalia
- Phylum: Chordata
- Class: Actinopterygii
- Division: Teleostei
- Order: Stomiiformes
- Family: Stomiidae
- Genus: Idiacanthus
- Species: I. fasciola

Binomial name
- Idiacanthus fasciola W. K. H. Peters, 1877

Synonyms
- Bathyophis ferox Günther, 1878; Idiacanthus ferox (Günther, 1878); Stylophthalmus paradoxus Brauer, 1902

= Ribbon sawtail fish =

Species of fish

The ribbon sawtail fish, Idiacanthus fasciola, is a barbeled dragonfish of the family Stomiidae, found around the world at depths over 500 m (1,640 ft) between latitudes 40° N and 54° S. Length is up to 38 cm (15 in) in general for the female, and 15 cm (5.9 in) for the male (generally between 81 and 85 vertebrae). The males of this species are developed to a lesser degree, as usual for Idiacanthus. While female specimen have a dark brown to black colour, males are usually of a lighter colour between dark brown to pale. The larval form, which has eyes on periscopic stalks, was originally identified under the invalid name Stylophthalmus paradoxus. Its diet is carnivorous, preying on living and dead fish or meat.

Etymology: Greek: edia = own, private + akantha: spine, thorn + Lat: fasciola ribbon, band
