= Symbolophorus rufinus =

Scientific classification
- Kingdom: Animalia
- Phylum: Chordata
- Class: Actinopterygii
- Order: Myctophiformes
- Family: Myctophidae
- Genus: Symbolophorus
- Species: S. rufinus

Binomial name
- Symbolophorus rufinus (Tåning, 1928)

Species of fish

Symbolophorus rufinus is a species of fish in the family Myctophidae.
