= Myctophum ovcharovi =

Scientific classification
- Domain: Eukaryota
- Kingdom: Animalia
- Phylum: Chordata
- Class: Actinopterygii
- Order: Myctophiformes
- Family: Myctophidae
- Genus: Myctophum
- Species: M. ovcharovi

Binomial name
- Myctophum ovcharovi Tsarin, 1993

Species of fish

Myctophum ovcharovi is a species of lanternfish.
