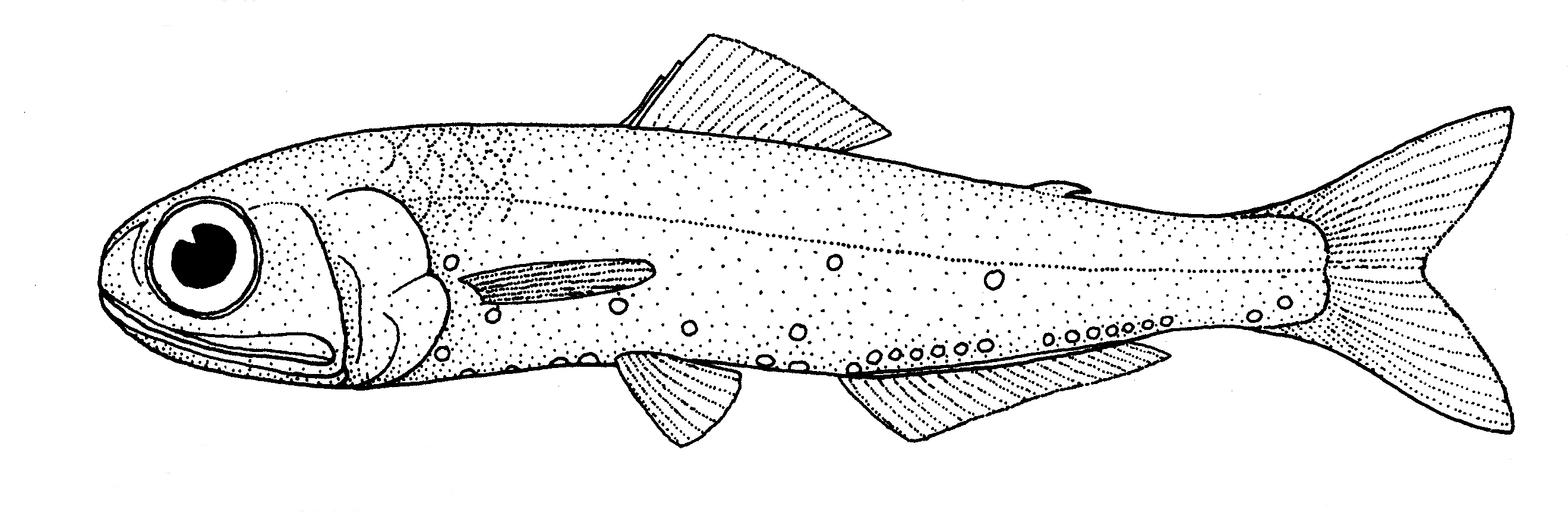
- Drawing by Dr Tony Ayling

Scientific classification
- Domain: Eukaryota
- Kingdom: Animalia
- Phylum: Chordata
- Class: Actinopterygii
- Order: Myctophiformes
- Family: Myctophidae
- Genus: Symbolophorus
- Species: S. barnardi

Binomial name
- Symbolophorus barnardi (Tåning, 1932)

= Symbolophorus barnardi =

Species of fish

Symbolophorus barnardi is a lanternfish in the family Myctophidae, found circumglobally in the southern hemisphere between about 30° S and 11° S at depths of between 100 and 800 m. Its length is about 12 cm. It inhabits the deeper waters during the day, and migrates at night to the epipelagic zone.
