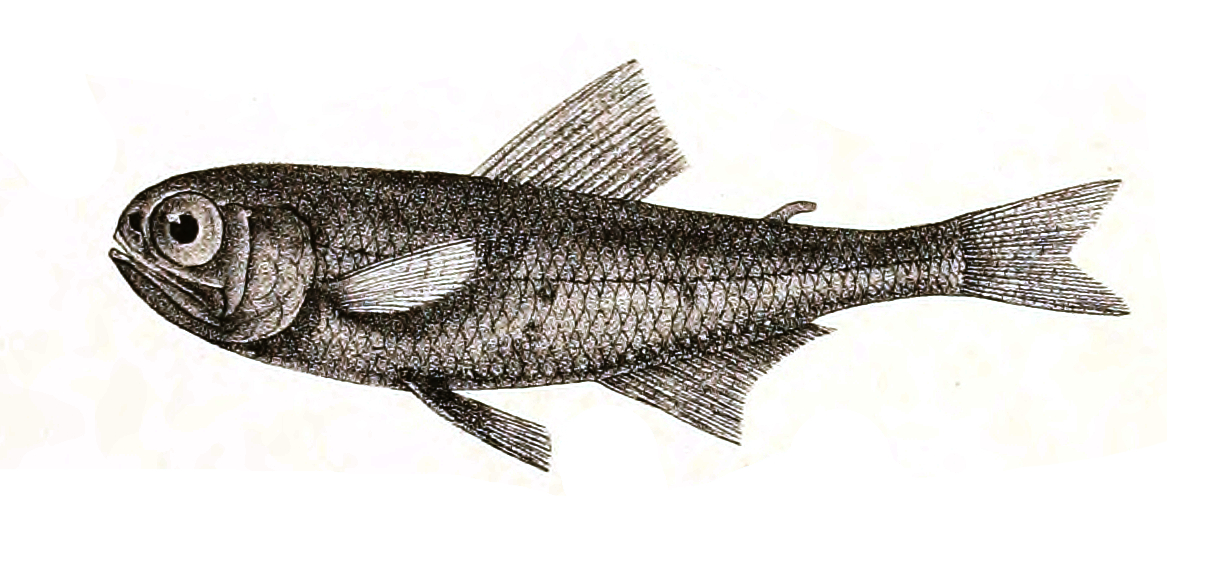

Scientific classification
- Domain: Eukaryota
- Kingdom: Animalia
- Phylum: Chordata
- Class: Actinopterygii
- Order: Myctophiformes
- Family: Myctophidae
- Genus: Myctophum
- Species: M. indicum

Binomial name
- Myctophum indicum F. Day, 1877

= Myctophum indicum =

Species of fish

Myctophum indicum is a species of lanternfish.
