= Myctophum lunatum =

Scientific classification
- Domain: Eukaryota
- Kingdom: Animalia
- Phylum: Chordata
- Class: Actinopterygii
- Order: Myctophiformes
- Family: Myctophidae
- Genus: Myctophum
- Species: M. lunatum

Binomial name
- Myctophum lunatum Becker & Borodulina, 1978

Species of fish

Myctophum lunatum is a species of lanternfish.
