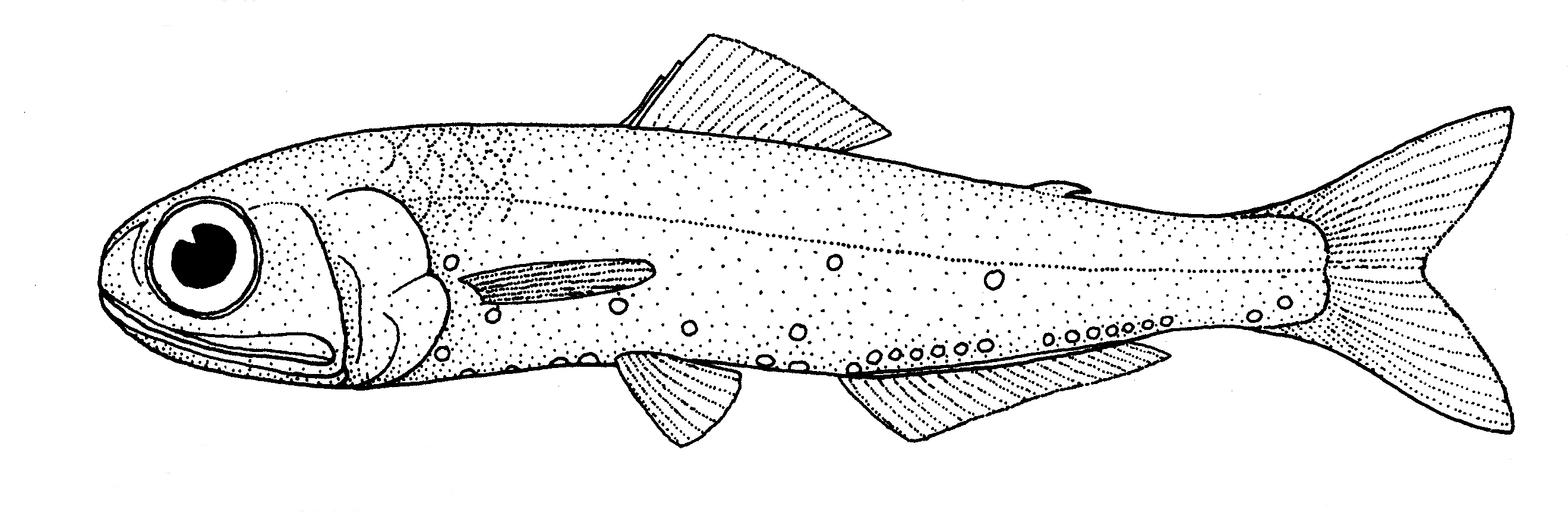
- Barnard's Lanternfish (S. barnardi)

Scientific classification
- Kingdom: Animalia
- Phylum: Chordata
- Class: Actinopterygii
- Order: Myctophiformes
- Family: Myctophidae
- Genus: Symbolophorus; Bolin & Wisner, 1959

Species
- See text.

= Symbolophorus =

Symbolophorus Temporal range: Miocene to Present

Genus of fishes

Symbolophorus is a genus of lanternfishes. It feeds on various small forms of sea life, in particular fish. Some species in this genus are known to exhibit the Stylophthalmine trait in their larval form. Symbolophorus grows slowly, and shows clear seasonal growth patterns that can be seen in its ear bones which records temperature change in the ocean’s environment.

== Species ==
There are currently eight recognized species in this genus:

- Symbolophorus barnardi (Tåning, 1932) (Barnard's lanternfish)
- Symbolophorus boops (J. Richardson, 1845) (Bogue lanternfish)
- Symbolophorus californiensis (C. H. Eigenmann & R. S. Eigenmann, 1889) (Bigfin lanternfish)
- Symbolophorus evermanni (C. H. Gilbert, 1905) (Evermann's lanternfish)
- Symbolophorus kreffti Hulley, 1981
- Symbolophorus reversus Gago & Ricord, 2005 (Reverse gland lanternfish)
- Symbolophorus rufinus (Tåning, 1928)
- Symbolophorus veranyi (É. Moreau, 1888) (Large-scale lanternfish)
