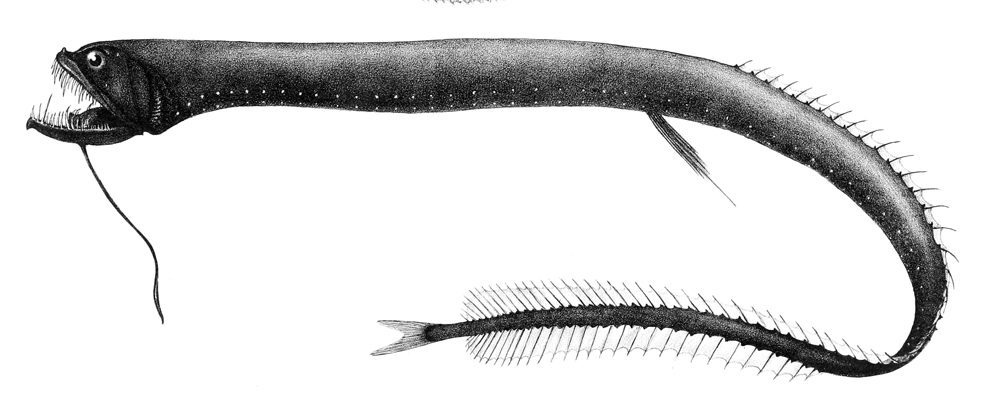

Conservation status
- Least Concern (IUCN 3.1)

Scientific classification
- Kingdom: Animalia
- Phylum: Chordata
- Class: Actinopterygii
- Order: Stomiiformes
- Family: Stomiidae
- Genus: Idiacanthus
- Species: I. atlanticus

Binomial name
- Idiacanthus atlanticus A. B. Brauer, 1906

= Idiacanthus atlanticus =

Idiacanthus atlanticus Temporal range: Miocene to recent

Species of fish

Idiacanthus atlanticus, the black dragonfish, is a barbeled dragonfish of the family Stomiidae, found circumglobally in southern subtropical and temperate oceans between latitudes 25°S and 60°S, at depths down to 2,000 metres (6,600 ft). The species is sexually dimorphic: females are black with six stripes; males are brown, and lack the females' canine teeth, pelvic fins and barbel. They can weigh between 13–15 grams. Females are believed to make a diel vertical migration from deeper than 500 metres (1,600 ft) by day to surface waters at night, whereas males do not migrate, remaining below 1,000 metres (3,300 ft) at all times.

Length is up to 40 centimetres (16 in) for the female, but only 4 centimetres (1.6 in) for the male. Black dragonfish are bioluminescent, but unlike most such predators, which use their light primarily to attract prey, they can see their own light. As a result, the fish can use their light to hunt. The light is nearly in the infrared and barely visible to the human eye.

In the larval stage, the eyes of the larvae appear as long stalks that dangle out of the body. Eventually, they retreat as the fish ages and reaches maturity.
