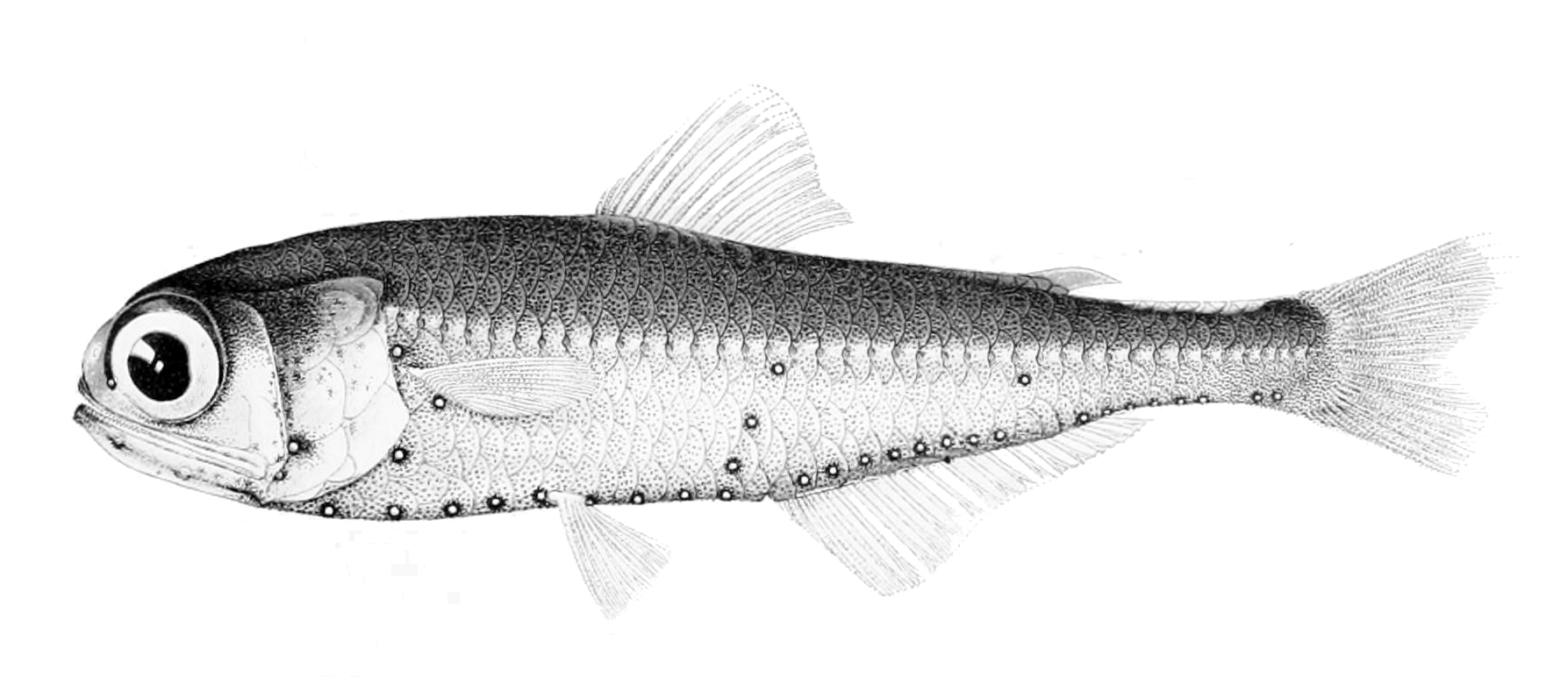

Scientific classification
- Kingdom: Animalia
- Phylum: Chordata
- Class: Actinopterygii
- Division: Teleostei
- Order: Myctophiformes
- Family: Myctophidae
- Genus: Myctophum
- Species: M. nitidulum

Binomial name
- Myctophum nitidulum Garman, 1899

Synonyms
- Myctophum margaritatum Gilbert, 1905

= Myctophum nitidulum =

Species of fish

Myctophum nitidulum, the pearly lanternfish, is a species of deep sea fish in the family Myctophidae, the "lanternfish".

== Description ==
Myctophum nitidulum grows to a maximum length of 8.3 cm (3.3 in).

== Distribution ==
This species is circumglobal in all tropical and subtropical seas. It is found in the follow regions:

- Eastern Atlantic Ocean ranging from Morocco to South Africa
- Western Atlantic Ocean from approximately 42° north to 34° south.
- The Indian Ocean from 7° north to 24° south
- Pacific Ocean from 32° north to 31° south, while also extending north to 40° north travelling in the Kuroshio Current.
- The South China Sea.

Myctophum nitidulum also occurs in the Galapagos.

== Habitat ==
This species lives in the bathypelagic zone, is oceanodromous, and is found at depths up to 1000 metres.
