= Symbolophorus reversus =

Scientific classification
- Domain: Eukaryota
- Kingdom: Animalia
- Phylum: Chordata
- Class: Actinopterygii
- Order: Myctophiformes
- Family: Myctophidae
- Genus: Symbolophorus
- Species: S. reversus

Binomial name
- Symbolophorus reversus Gago & Ricord, 2005

Species of fish

Symbolophorus reversus is a species of fish in the family Myctophidae.
