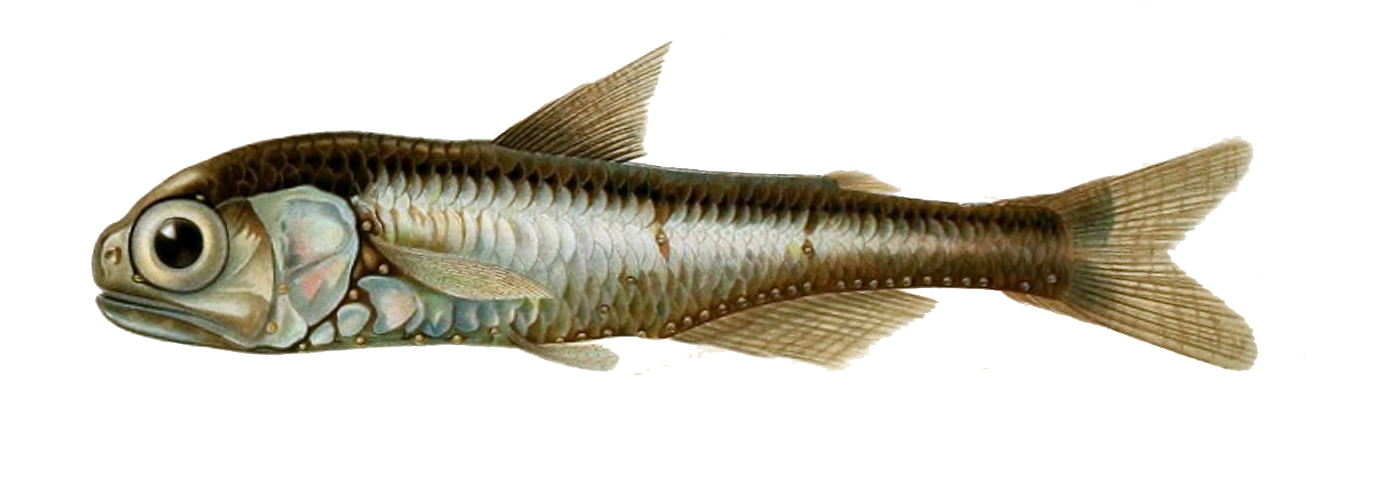

Conservation status
- Least Concern (IUCN 3.1)

Scientific classification
- Kingdom: Animalia
- Phylum: Chordata
- Class: Actinopterygii
- Order: Myctophiformes
- Family: Myctophidae
- Genus: Myctophum
- Species: M. punctatum

Binomial name
- Myctophum punctatum Rafinesque, 1810

= Myctophum punctatum =

Species of fish

Myctophum punctatum is a species of mesopelagic fish in the family Myctophidae. Its common name is spotted lanternfish, sometimes spelled spotted lanterfish. It is found in the Northern Atlantic and in the Mediterranean at depths down to 1,000 m (3,280 ft). It is one of the dominant species in midwater assemblages near the Mid-Atlantic Ridge.

Myctophum punctatum can grow to 11 cm (4.3 in) SL. It performs diurnal migrations to the surface at dusk. It feeds mostly on copepods and euphausiids.

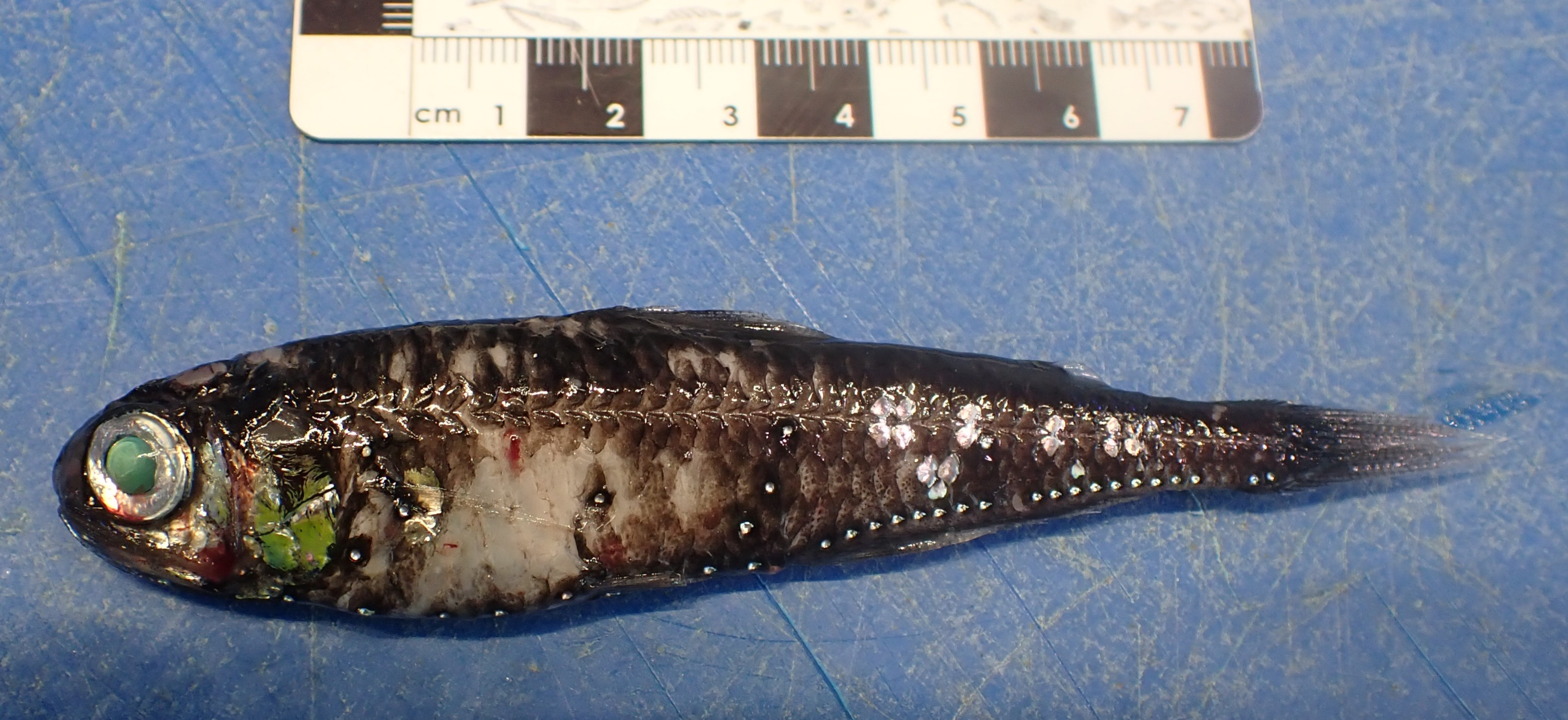
A fresh specimen of Myctophum punctatum.

Larvae of Myctophum punctatum have stalked eyes.
