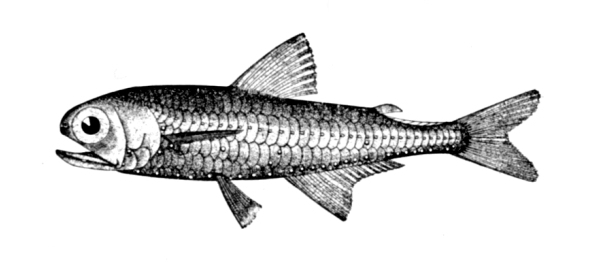

Scientific classification
- Domain: Eukaryota
- Kingdom: Animalia
- Phylum: Chordata
- Class: Actinopterygii
- Order: Myctophiformes
- Family: Myctophidae
- Genus: Myctophum
- Species: M. affine

Binomial name
- Myctophum affine (Lütken, 1892)

Synonyms
- Scopelus affinis Lütken, 1892

= Myctophum affine =

Species of fish

Myctophum affine, the metallic lanternfish, is a species of lanternfish native to the Atlantic Ocean. Myctophum affine grows to a length of 7.9 centimetres (3.1 in) SL.

== Description ==
Phenotypic observations of Myctophum affine presume that males carry dorsal luminous scales, while females of the species have luminous ventral scales. It is stated that males typically possess seven or eight luminous dorsal scales, while females usually have three to four luminous ventral scales. The luminous scales of male Myctophum affine begin to develop at smaller sizes than those of the female (Gibbs, 1957).
