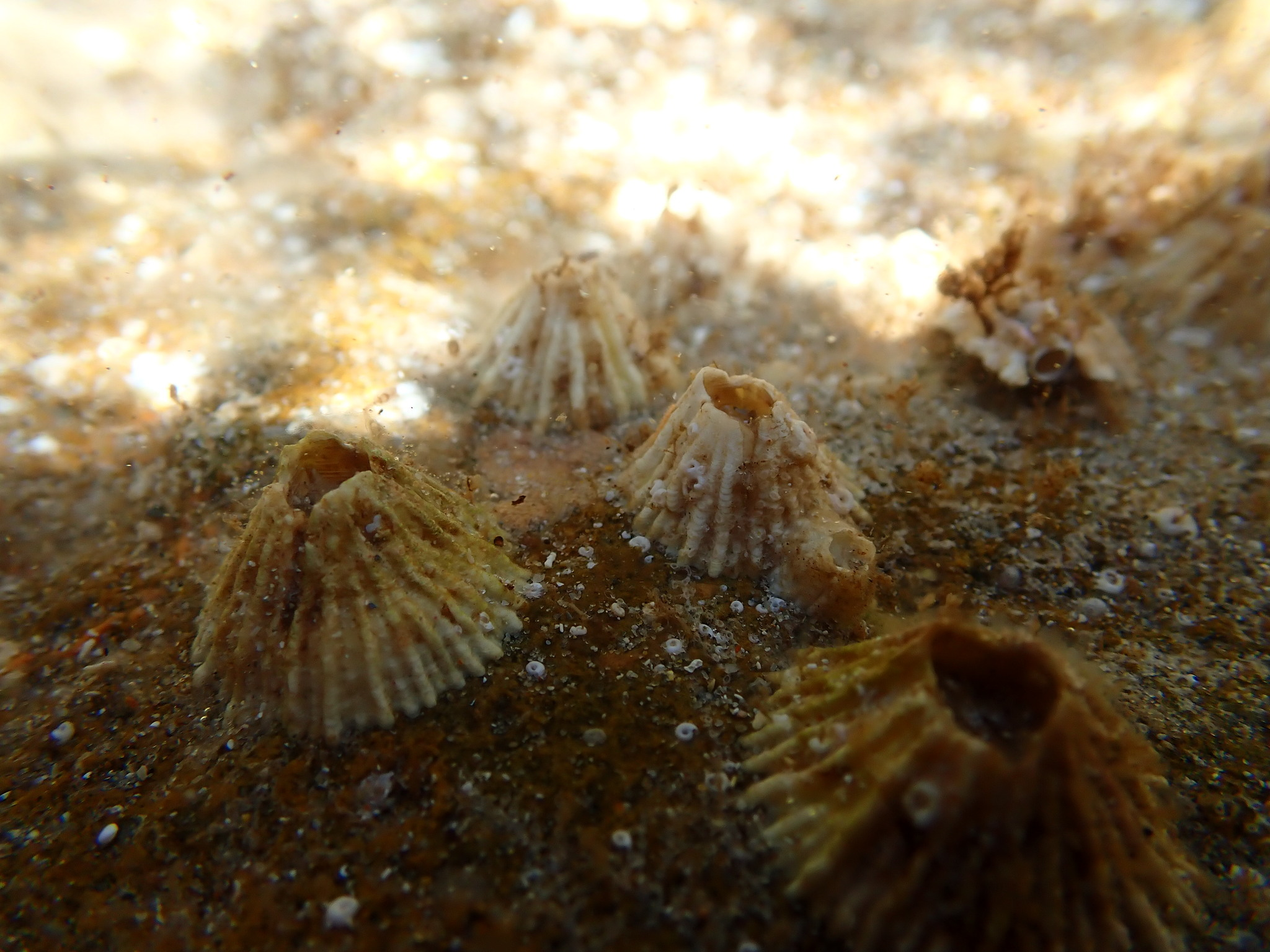
- Epopella simplex, Tasmania, Australia

Scientific classification
- Kingdom: Animalia
- Phylum: Arthropoda
- Class: Thecostraca
- Subclass: Cirripedia
- Order: Balanomorpha
- Family: Tetraclitidae
- Genus: Epopella; Ross, 1970

= Epopella =

Genus of crustaceans

Epopella is a genus of symmetrical sessile barnacles in the family Tetraclitidae. There are about six described species in Epopella.

== Species ==
These species belong to the genus Epopella:

- Epopella breviscutum (Broch, 1922)
- Epopella eoplicata Buckeridge, 1983
- Epopella eosimplex (Darwin, 1854)
- Epopella kermadeca Foster, 1978
- Epopella plicata (Gray, 1843)
- Epopella simplex (Darwin, 1854)
