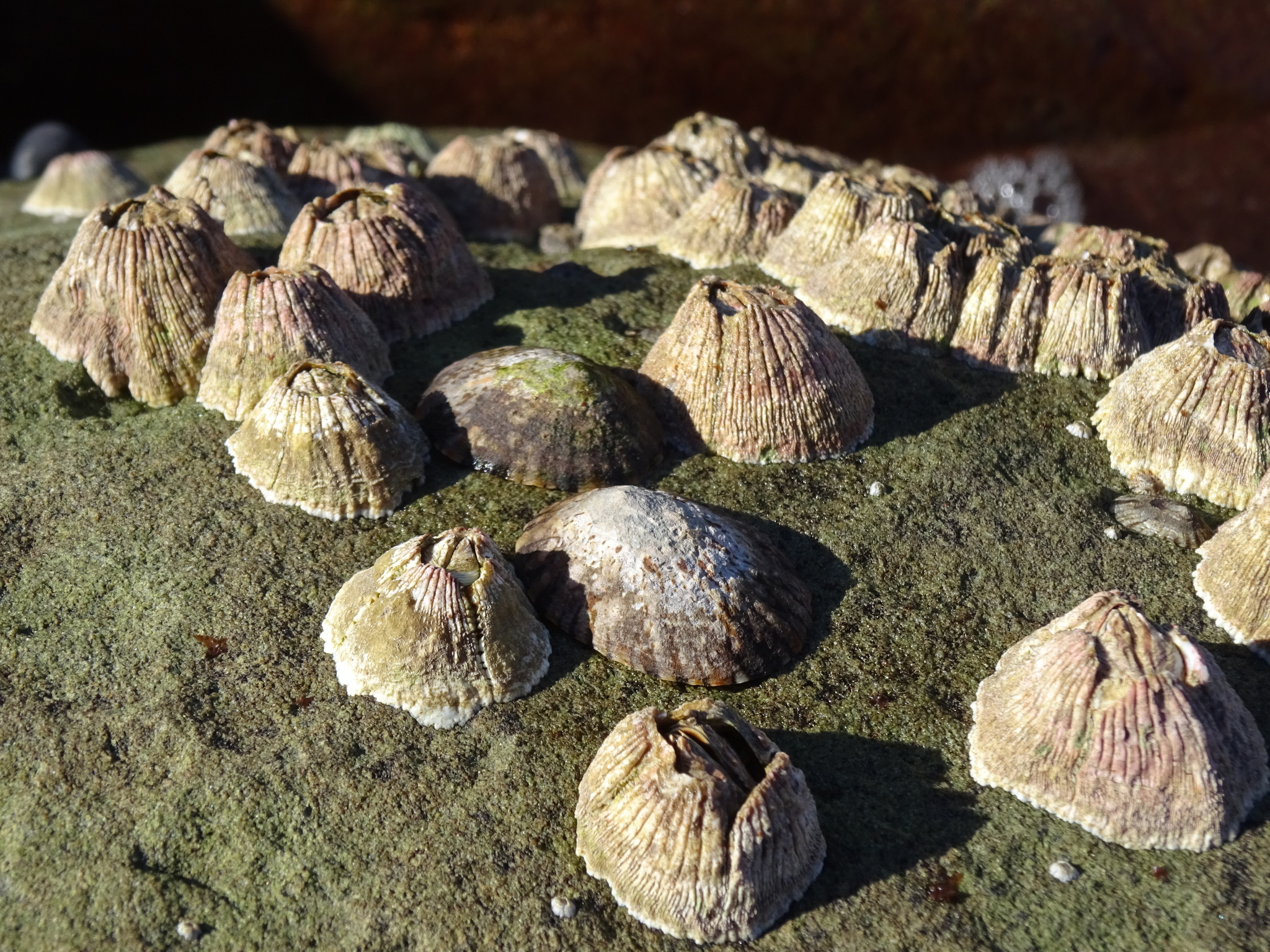

Scientific classification
- Kingdom: Animalia
- Phylum: Arthropoda
- Class: Thecostraca
- Subclass: Cirripedia
- Order: Balanomorpha
- Family: Tetraclitidae
- Genus: Tesseropora; Pilsbry, 1916

= Tesseropora =

Tesseropora Temporal range: Oligocene–Recent

Genus of barnacles

Tesseropora is a genus of barnacles in the family Tetraclitidae found around the world. Fossils have been found dating to the Oligocene epoch, and there are several extinct species included in the genus. The genus is characterized by having four shell wall plates and a single row of pores.

== Species ==
- Tesseropora alba Ren & Liu, 1979
- Tesseropora arnoldi Young, 1998
- Tesseropora atlantica Newman & Ross, 1976
- †Tesseropora isseli (de Alessandri, 1895)
- Tesseropora pacifica (Pilsbry, 1928)
- Tesseropora rapax Jones, 1993
- Tesseropora rosea (Krauss, 1848)
- Tesseropora wireni (Nilsson-Cantell, 1921)
