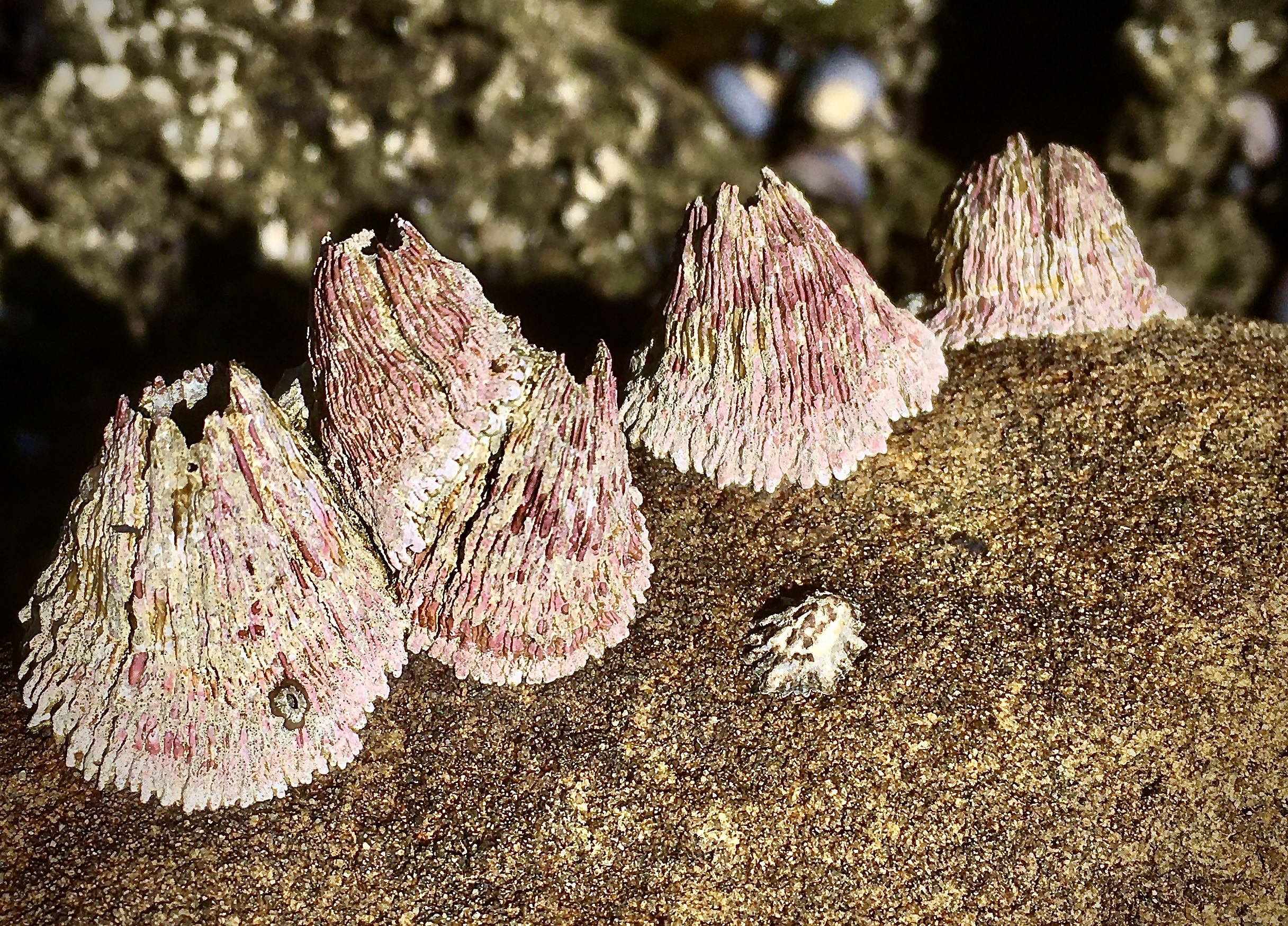

Scientific classification
- Kingdom: Animalia
- Phylum: Arthropoda
- Class: Thecostraca
- Subclass: Cirripedia
- Order: Balanomorpha
- Family: Tetraclitidae
- Genus: Tetraclita
- Species: T. rubescens

Binomial name
- Tetraclita rubescens Darwin, 1854

= Tetraclita rubescens =

Pink volcano barnacle

Species of crustacean

Tetraclita rubescens, commonly known as the pink volcano barnacle, is a species of sessile barnacle in the family Tetraclitidae.

Pink volcano barnacles are a large species, with a ruddy colouration and shell comprising four plates. Their diameter, at the base, measures from 20–50 millimetres (0.8–2.0 in). The barnacles produce several hundred nauplii per brood, which they have two or three of each mating season, when they reproduce by copulation. The nauplii then live pelagically for a few weeks. Reaching sexual maturity after two years, the barnacles can live up to fifteen years. The barnacles are found on the southwestern Pacific coast of North America.
