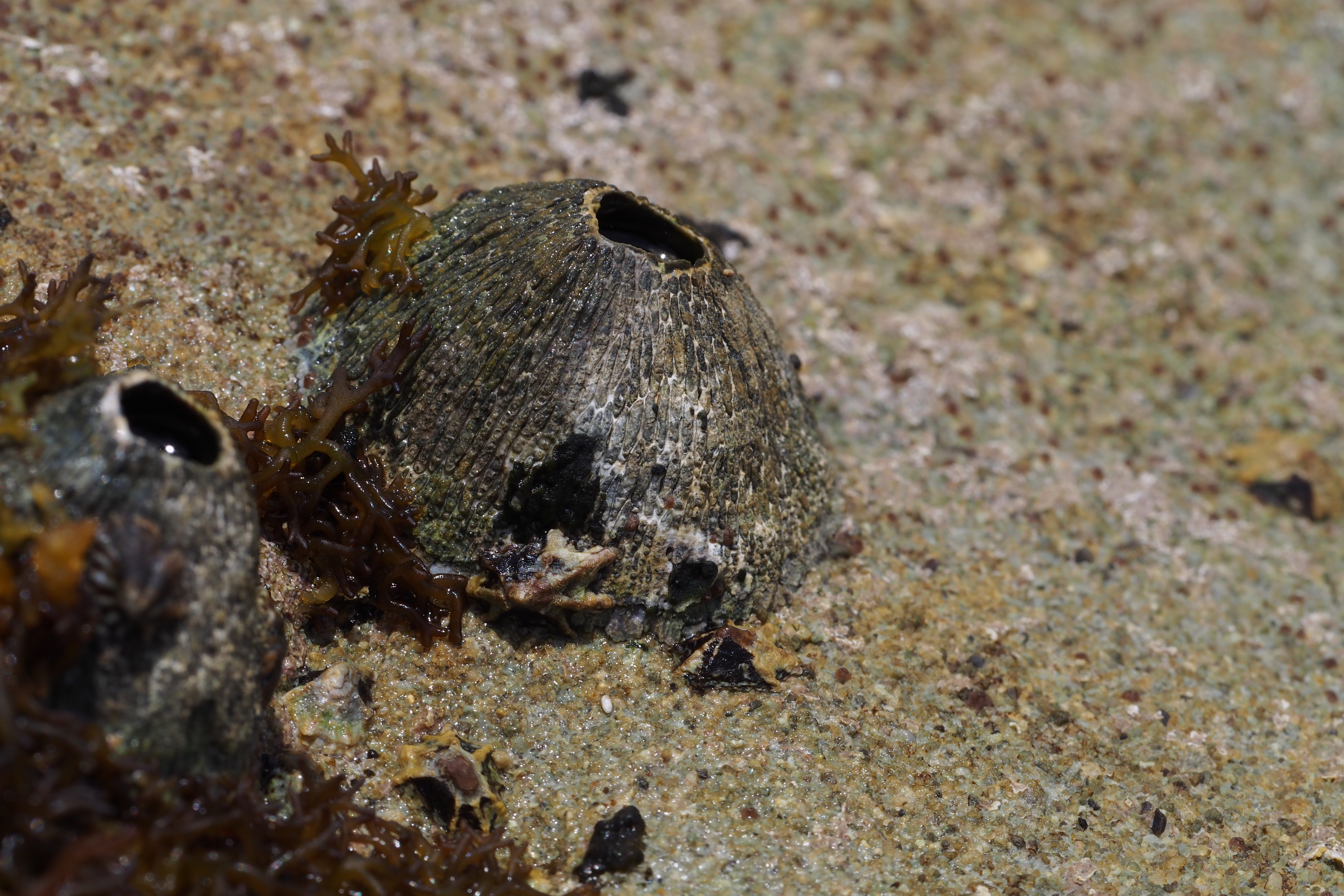
- Pink barnacle, Tetraclita squamosa

Scientific classification
- Kingdom: Animalia
- Phylum: Arthropoda
- Class: Thecostraca
- Subclass: Cirripedia
- Order: Balanomorpha
- Family: Tetraclitidae
- Genus: Tetraclita; Schumacher, 1817

= Tetraclita =

Genus of barnacles

Tetraclita is a genus of sessile barnacles in the family Tetraclitidae. There are more than 20 described species in Tetraclita.

== Species ==
These 24 species belong to the genus Tetraclita:

- Tetraclita achituvi Ross, 1999
- Tetraclita alba Nilsson-Cantell, 1932
- Tetraclita aoranga Foster, 1978
- Tetraclita barnesorum Ross, 1999
- Tetraclita concamerata
- Tetraclita dumortieri Fischer, 1865
- Tetraclita ehsani Shahdadi, Chan & Sari, 2011
- Tetraclita floridana Pilsbry, 1916
- Tetraclita formosana Hiro, 1939
- Tetraclita hentscheli Kolosvary, 1942
- Tetraclita imbricata
- Tetraclita japonica (Pilsbry, 1916) (Japanese volcano barnacle)
- Tetraclita kuroshioensis Chan, Tsang & Chu, 2007
- Tetraclita porosa (Gmelin, 1790)
- Tetraclita reni Chan, Hsu & Tsai, 2009
- Tetraclita rubella
- Tetraclita rubescens Darwin, 1854
- Tetraclita rufotincta Pilsbry, 1916
- Tetraclita serrata Darwin, 1854
- Tetraclita singaporensis Chan, Tsang & Chu, 2007
- Tetraclita spec Nilsson-Cantell, 1931
- Tetraclita squamosa (Bruguière, 1789)
- Tetraclita squamulosa Schumacher, 1817
- Tetraclita stalactifera (Lamarck, 1818)
