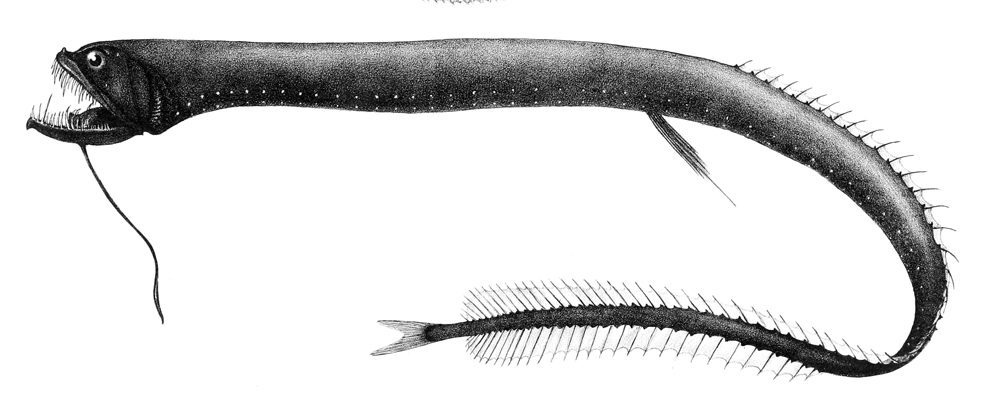
- Black Dragonfish (I. atlanticus)
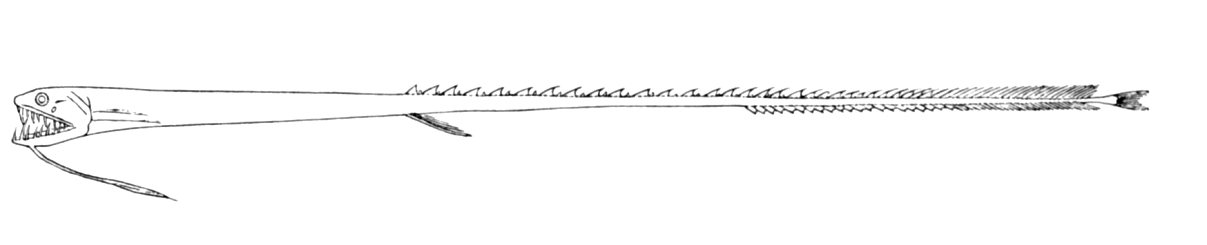
- Ribbon Sawtail Fish (I. fasciola)

Scientific classification
- Kingdom: Animalia
- Phylum: Chordata
- Class: Actinopterygii
- Division: Teleostei
- Order: Stomiiformes
- Family: Stomiidae
- Subfamily: Idiacanthinae
- Genus: Idiacanthus; W. K. H. Peters, 1877

= Idiacanthus =

Genus of fishes

Idiacanthus is a genus of barbeled dragonfishes, the larvae of which are noted for exhibiting the Stylophthalmine trait.

Etymology: greek: idia = own, privat + akantha = spine, thorn

== Species ==
There are currently three recognized species in this genus:

- Idiacanthus antrostomus C. H. Gilbert, 1890 (Pacific blackdragon)
- Idiacanthus atlanticus A. B. Brauer, 1906 (Black dragonfish)
- Idiacanthus fasciola W. K. H. Peters, 1877 (Ribbon sawtail fish)

== Ecology ==
=== Distribution and habitat ===
Members of this genus have been found from the mesopelagic zone to the bathypelagic zone. Idiacanthus atlanticus is found in subtropical to temperate habitats, mainly in the southern hemisphere. Idiacanthus fasciola is more widely distributed, found in both North and South Atlantic as well as the Indo-Pacific and other areas. Idiacanthus antrostomus is mainly found in the Eastern Pacific.

=== Reproduction ===
The average fertile Idiacanthus fasciola female is known to hold approximately 14,000 eggs. Eggs found in the ovaries' anterior region were full, but paler than eggs found in the posterior region. For the anterior region eggs, oil globules were not found either.

== Anatomy ==
Male and female idiacanthidae are distinguishable from their fin differences. Male idiacanthidae have developed pelvic fins, whereas female idiacanthidae have no paired fins. Through evolution, notochord sheaths in Idiacanthus antrostomus have aligned to a straight connection from the occiput to the first vertebra. Female idiacanthidae can reach 40 cm in length whereas males have been recorded to only reach a maximum of 5 cm.

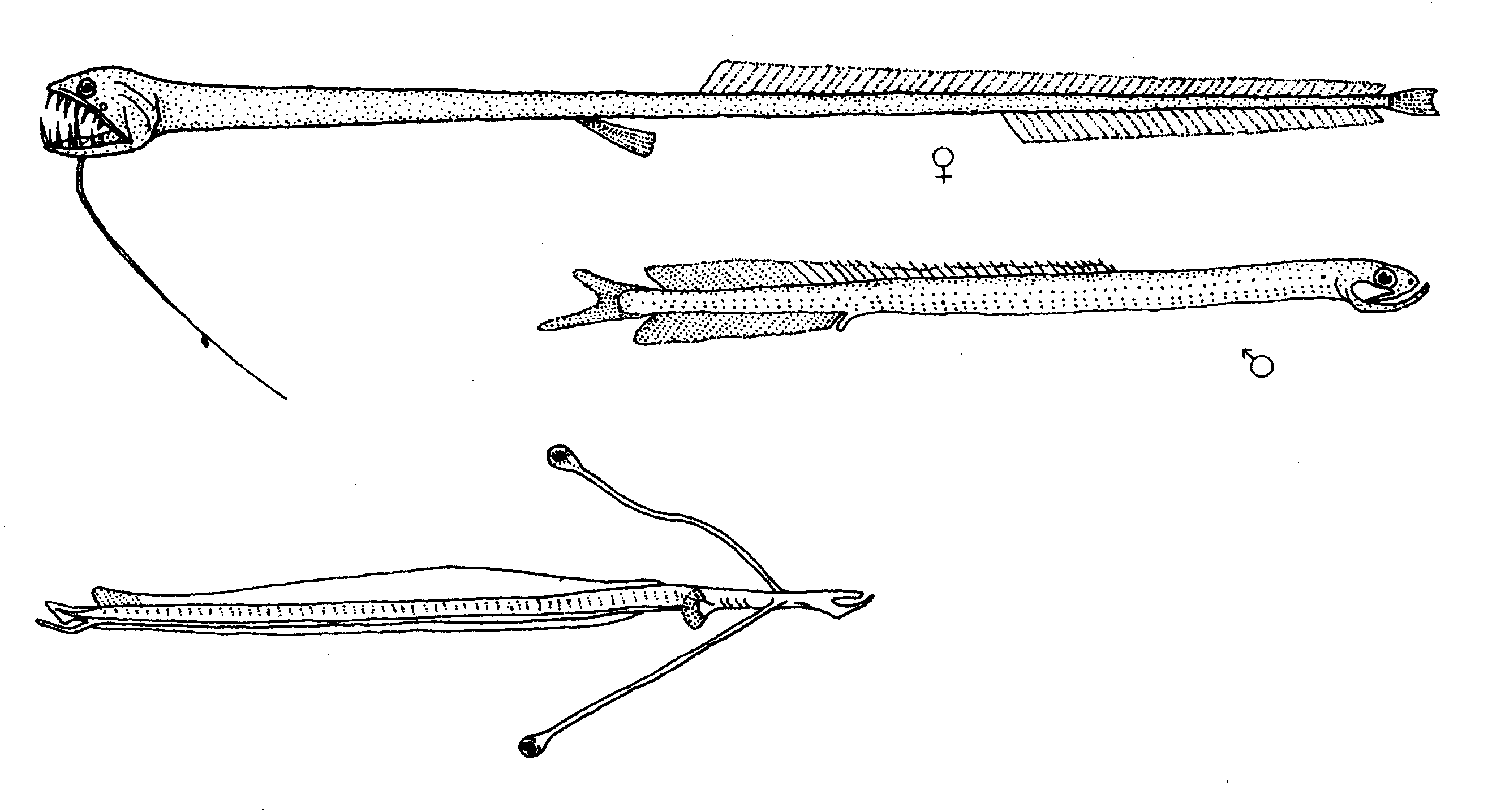
Anatomical differences between female and male Idiacanthus atlanticus

Female I. atlanticus have small eyes, a chin barbel, and large jaw teeth. The smaller male has neither teeth, chin barbel, nor a functioning gut. Both males and females have small photophores spread throughout the body. Larger photophores can be found along the body side. Female idiacanthidae have a dorsal fin with a long base anterior to its midbody. Females have black skin while male idiacanthidae are dark brown.

For I. fasciola, females have a well-ossified skeleton while males have a cartilaginous skeleton. There are also the aforementioned differences of teeth, barbel, and black vs brown color.

Idiacanthidae have a snout equal or less than their bony orbit length with nostrils closer to their eyes than snout. Their premaxilla, maxilla, and mandible teeth are almost all capable of being depressed. Idiacanthidae also present pectoral fins in larvae, but have an absence in adulthood.

== Bioluminescence ==
Idiacanthus possess a luminous spherical organ that hangs off the lower jaw as a thin barbell. Along both the dorsal and ventral sides of its body, the Idiacanthus has a single strip of chevron-shaped spots of luminescent tissue that, when stimulated, appears to glow either yellow or blue-green. Similar tissue is also found radiating along its fins. Studies by William T. O'Day in 1973 have shown that this tissue can be stimulated by injection of adrenaline into the muscle, topical application of adrenaline, submersion of the body in a solution of sea water and adrenaline, and occasionally tactile touch. The duration of the emitted light has only been observed to be a few seconds long.
