= Myctophum fissunovi =

Scientific classification
- Domain: Eukaryota
- Kingdom: Animalia
- Phylum: Chordata
- Class: Actinopterygii
- Order: Myctophiformes
- Family: Myctophidae
- Genus: Myctophum
- Species: M. fissunovi

Binomial name
- Myctophum fissunovi Becker & Borodulina, 1971

Species of fish

Myctophum fissunovi is a species of lanternfish.
