= Myctophum aurolaternatum =

Scientific classification
- Domain: Eukaryota
- Kingdom: Animalia
- Phylum: Chordata
- Class: Actinopterygii
- Order: Myctophiformes
- Family: Myctophidae
- Genus: Myctophum
- Species: M. aurolaternatum

Binomial name
- Myctophum aurolaternatum Garman, 1899

Species of fish

Myctophum aurolaternatum, the golden lanternfish, is a species of lanternfish.

This species reaches a length of 11.0 cm (4.3 in).
