= Peduncle (anatomy) =

Elongated stalk of tissue

A peduncle is an elongated stalk of tissue. Sessility is the state of not having a peduncle; a sessile mass or structure lacks a stalk.

In medicine, a mass such as a cyst or polyp is said to be pedunculated if it is supported by a peduncle.

There are in total three types of peduncles in the cerebellum of the human brain, known as superior cerebellar peduncle, middle cerebellar peduncle, and inferior cerebellar peduncle.

The appendix of the epididymis is also called pedunculated hydatid (due to being stalked), whereas the appendix of testis is also named sessile hydatid.

Pedunculated eyes are also the defining attribute of the stylophthalmine trait found in certain fish larvae. The caudal peduncle is a slightly narrowed part of a fish where the caudal fin meets the spine.

== See also ==
- Peduncle (botany)
