= Stylophthalmine trait =

Fish eye adaptation in larval stage

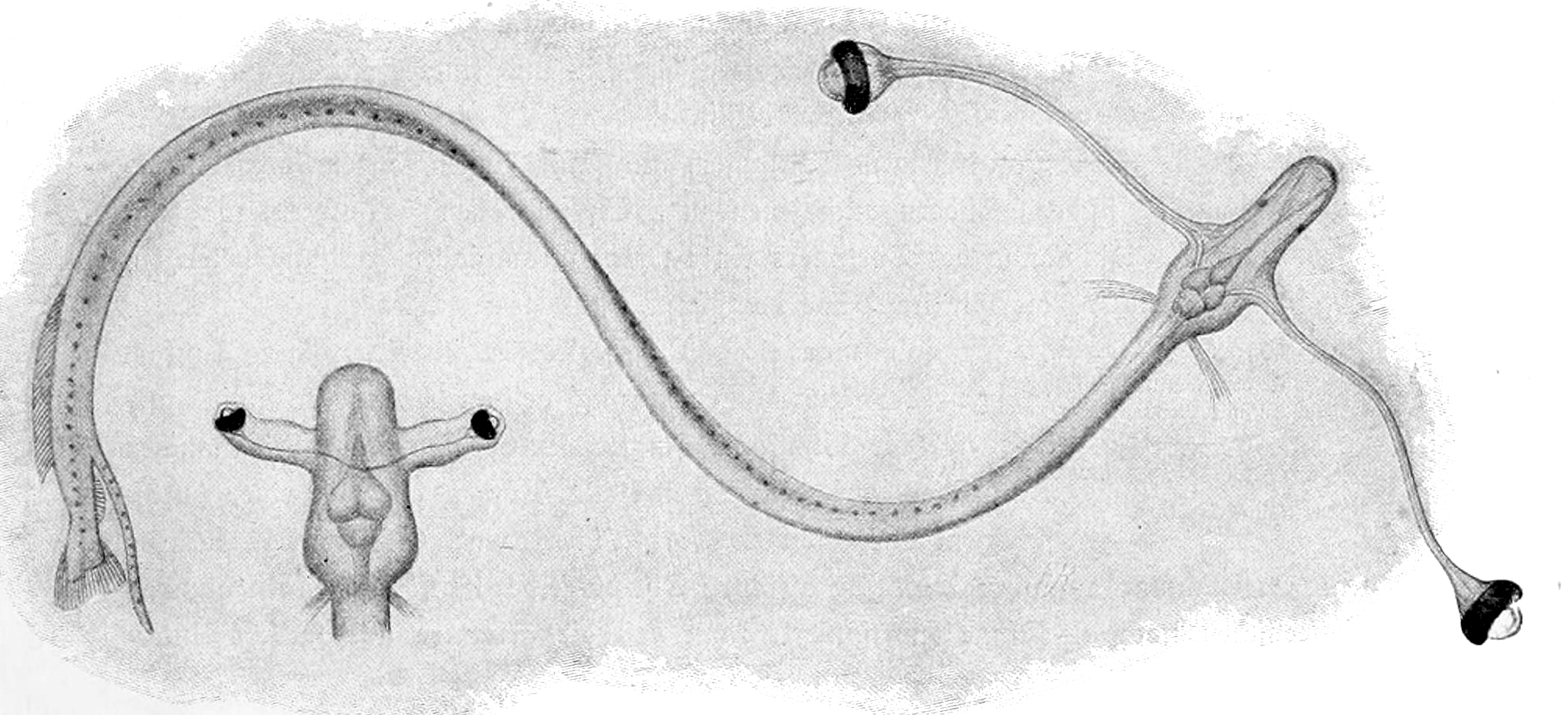
Larval Idiacanthus fasciola, demonstrating an extreme form of the stylophthalmine trait

The stylophthalmine trait is an adaptation present in the larvae of several different species of actinopterygian fish. It is characterised by the development of elliptically shaped eyes, which are situated at the apex of long periscopic stalks extending from the larva's head. Stylophthalmine can be used as a general term to describe such larvae.

The trait has developed as a result of convergent evolution at least four times in different groups of fish; twice in the family Myctophidae (in species of Myctophum and Symbolophorus), and also in the families Stomiidae (genus Idiacanthus), and Bathylagidae (Bathylagus).

The work of Weihhs and Moser (1981) showed that the eye's elliptical shape allows a stylophthalmine to dramatically enlarge its field of view through rotation on the stalk, giving a much larger effective pupil size.

Three unrelated species with stylophthalmine larvae were once placed in the now discredited genus Stylophthalmus.
