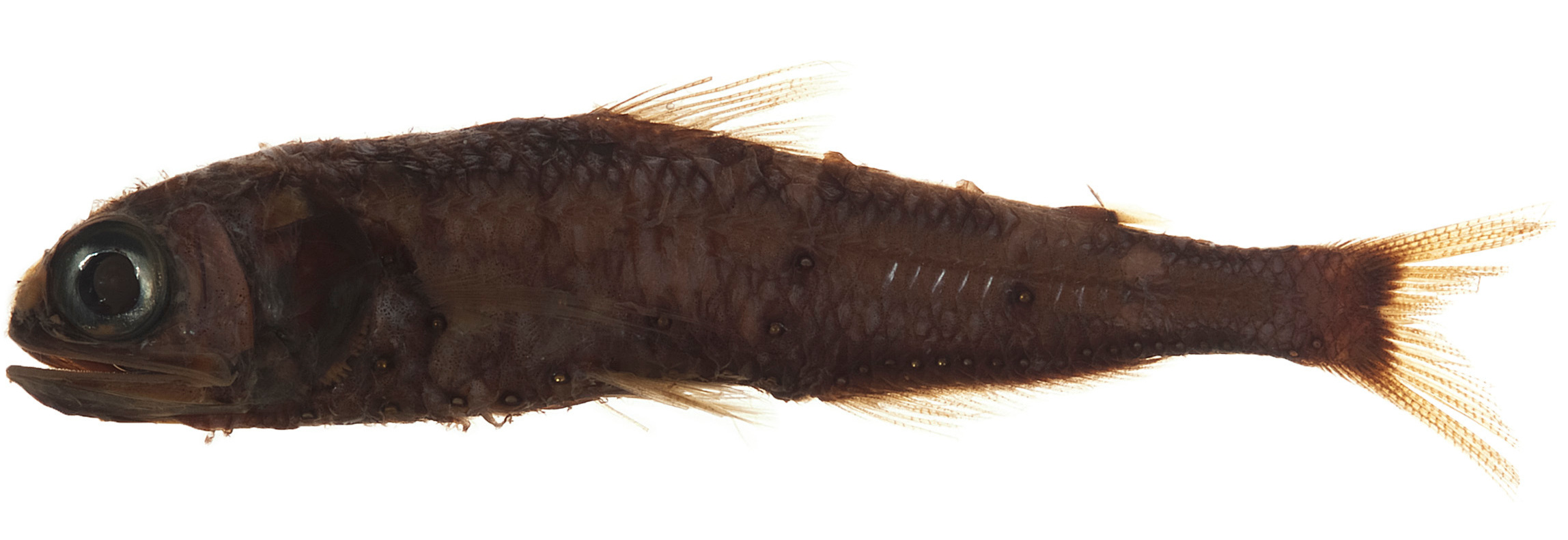

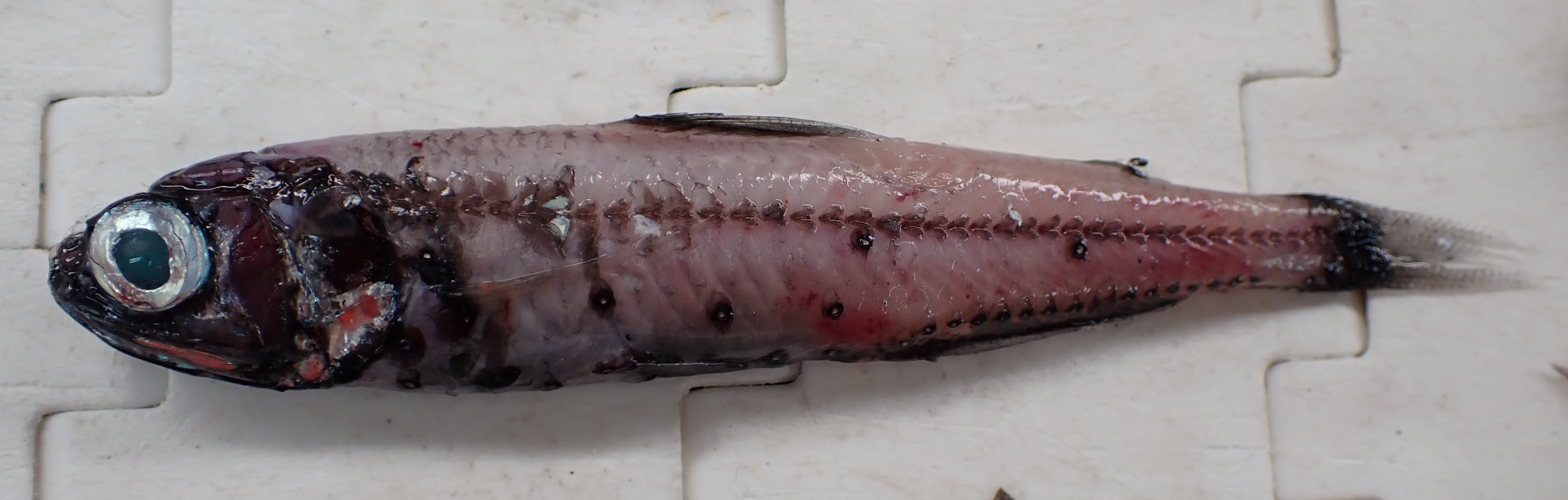

Conservation status
- Least Concern (IUCN 3.1)

Scientific classification
- Kingdom: Animalia
- Phylum: Chordata
- Class: Actinopterygii
- Order: Myctophiformes
- Family: Myctophidae
- Genus: Symbolophorus
- Species: S. veranyi

Binomial name
- Symbolophorus veranyi (Moreau, 1888)

Synonyms
- Scopelus veranyi Moreau, 1888 Stylophthalmus mediterraneus Mazzarelli, 1909 Symbolophorus verany (Moreau, 1888)

= Symbolophorus veranyi =

Species of fish

Symbolophorus veranyi, the large-scale lantern fish, is a species of fish in the family Myctophidae.

== Etymology ==
Symbolophorus takes its name from the Greek symbolon meaning mark or signal and pherein, meaning to carry; this refers to the strongly angulated series of supra-anal photophores. The specific name of S. veranyi honours French pharmacist-naturalist Jean Baptist Vérany, the co-founder and director of the Muséum d'Histoire Naturelle de Nice, near which S. veranyi was first found.

== Description ==
Symbolophorus veranyi reaches a maximum length of 12.5cm and has a maximum recorded weight of 21.3g. This fish has a fusiform or torpedo-like body shape. The eyes are fairly large. Like other lanternfishes, S. veranyi has a species-specific arrangement of light organs on its underside and flanks, including a strongly angulate pattern of supra-anal photophores that distinguishes this genus from other myctophids.

== Distribution and habitat ==
Symbolophorus veranyi is a mesopelagic fish with a wide distribution across the Atlantic Ocean and Mediterranean. This species engages in diel vertical migration, remaining at depths of 550-700m during daylight hours and ascending near the surface at night. There is some size stratification at night, with smaller individuals found at deeper depths than larger adults.

== Diet and predators ==
Symbolophorus veranyi feeds on a variety of zooplankton and micronekton, including amphipods and other fishes. It is a prey item for a variety of oceanic predators, including swordfish and Common dolphins.

== Reproduction ==
In the Mediterranean, S. veranyi appears to spawn year-round, however juveniles may be more abundant in certain parts of the year, as evidenced by stranding events in the Strait of Messina.
