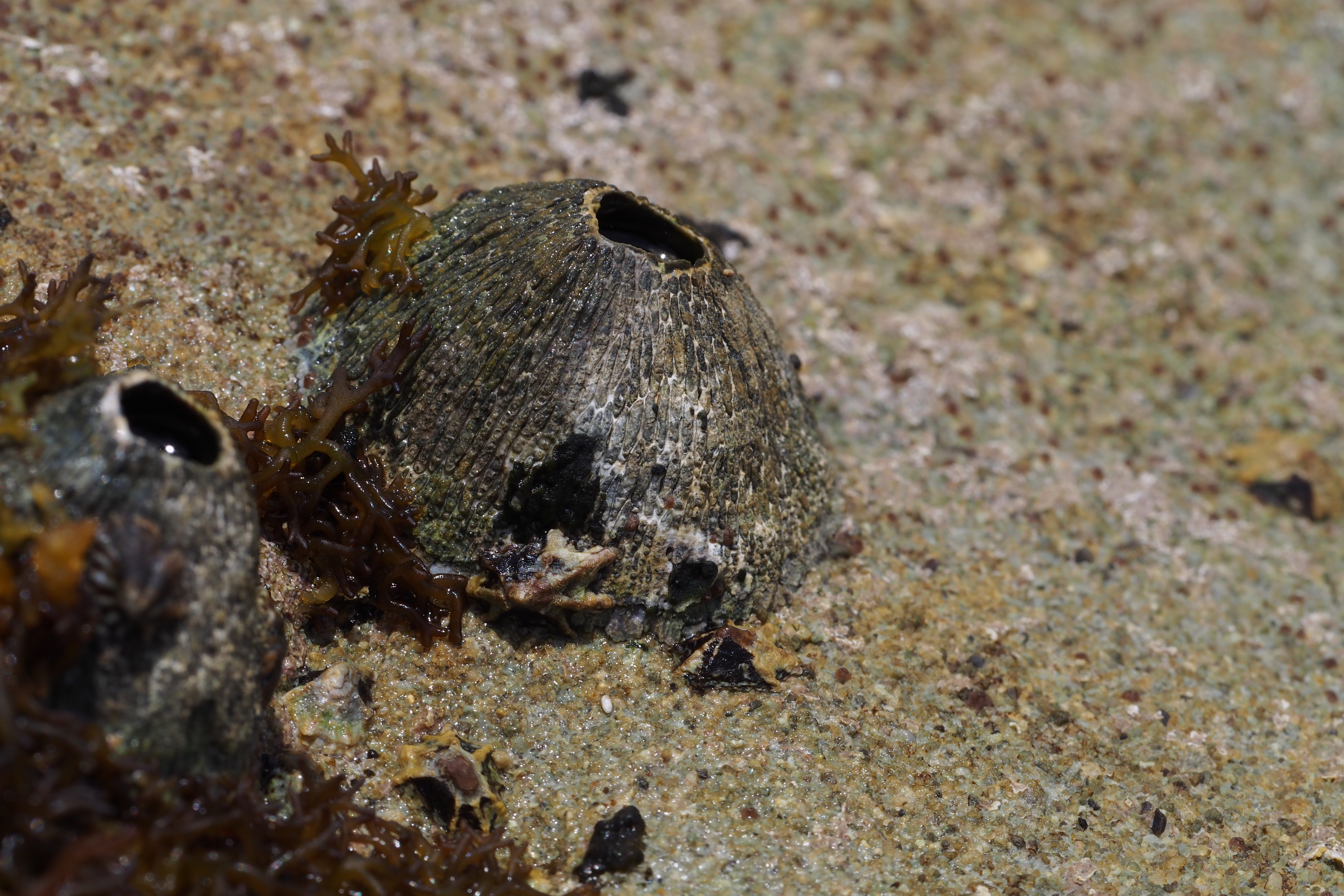
- Pink barnacle, Tetraclita squamosa

Scientific classification
- Kingdom: Animalia
- Phylum: Arthropoda
- Class: Thecostraca
- Subclass: Cirripedia
- Order: Balanomorpha
- Superfamily: Coronuloidea
- Family: Tetraclitidae; Gruvel 1903

= Tetraclitidae =

Family of crustaceans

Tetraclitidae is a family of sessile barnacles in the order Balanomorpha. There are about 10 genera and more than 50 described species in Tetraclitidae.

== Genera ==
These 10 genera belong to the family Tetraclitidae:

- Astroclita Ren & Liu, 1979
- Epopella Ross, 1970
- Lissaclita Gomez-Daglio & Van Syoc, 2006
- Neonrosella Jones, 2010
- Newmanella Ross, 1969
- Tesseropora Pilsbry, 1916
- Tetraclita Schumacher, 1817
- Tetraclitella Hiro, 1939
- Yamaguchiella Ross & Perreault, 1999
- † Tesseroplax Ross, 1969
