= Diaphus drachmanni =

Conservation status
- Data Deficient (IUCN 3.1)

Scientific classification
- Kingdom: Animalia
- Phylum: Chordata
- Class: Actinopterygii
- Order: Myctophiformes
- Family: Myctophidae
- Genus: Diaphus
- Species: D. drachmanni

Binomial name
- Diaphus drachmanni Tåning, 1932

Species of fish

Diaphus drachmanni, also known as Drachmann's lanternfish, is a species of lanternfish found in the eastern Indian Ocean.

== Etymology ==
The fish is named in honor of Danish classical philologist Anders Bjørn Drachmann (1860-1935), the president of the Carlsberg Foundation, which financed the early 20th century Dana expedition that collected the type specimen.
