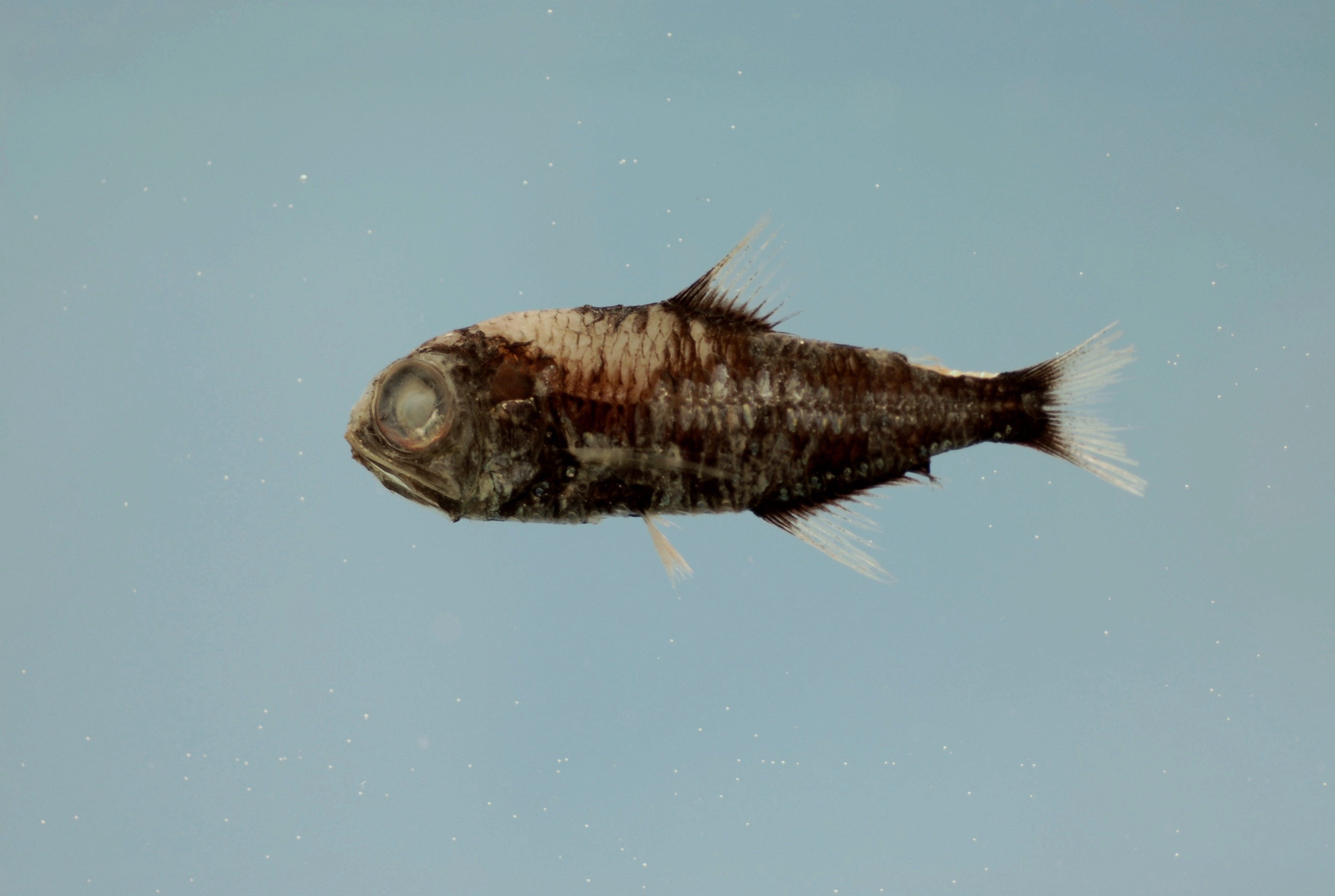

Conservation status
- Least Concern (IUCN 3.1)

Scientific classification
- Kingdom: Animalia
- Phylum: Chordata
- Class: Actinopterygii
- Order: Myctophiformes
- Family: Myctophidae
- Genus: Dasyscopelus
- Species: D. selenops

Binomial name
- Dasyscopelus selenops (Tåning, 1928)

Synonyms
- Myctophum selenops Tåning, 1928; Myctophum selenoides Wisner, 1971

= Dasyscopelus selenops =

Species of fish

Dasyscopelus selenops, the Wisner's lanternfish, is a species of lanternfish. It occurs in the Atlantic, Indian, and Pacific Oceans. It can grow to 7.5 cm (3.0 in) total length.
