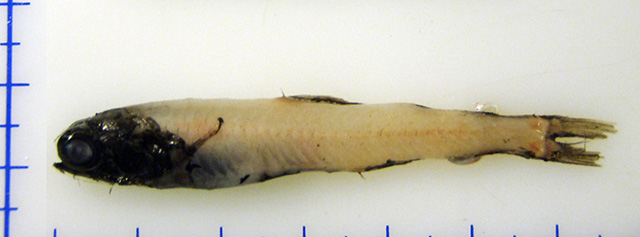

Scientific classification
- Kingdom: Animalia
- Phylum: Chordata
- Class: Actinopterygii
- Order: Myctophiformes
- Family: Myctophidae
- Genus: Taaningichthys
- Species: T. bathyphilus

Binomial name
- Taaningichthys bathyphilus Tåning, 1928

= Taaningichthys bathyphilus =

Species of fish

Taaningichthys bathyphilus is a species of lanternfish.
