= Diaphus schmidti =

Conservation status
- Least Concern (IUCN 3.1)

Scientific classification
- Kingdom: Animalia
- Phylum: Chordata
- Class: Actinopterygii
- Order: Myctophiformes
- Family: Myctophidae
- Genus: Diaphus
- Species: D. schmidti

Binomial name
- Diaphus schmidti Tåning, 1932

Species of fish

Diaphus schmidti is a species of lanternfish found in widespread areas of the tropical and the subtropical Pacific Ocean.

== Description ==
This species reaches a length of 5.3 cm (2.1 in).

== Etymology ==
The fish is named in honor of Danish biologist Johannes Schmidt (1877–1933), who led the Dana expedition that collected the type specimen.
