= Diaphus jenseni =

Conservation status
- Least Concern (IUCN 3.1)

Scientific classification
- Kingdom: Animalia
- Phylum: Chordata
- Class: Actinopterygii
- Order: Myctophiformes
- Family: Myctophidae
- Genus: Diaphus
- Species: D. jenseni

Binomial name
- Diaphus jenseni Tåning, 1932

Species of fish

Diaphus jenseni, also known as Jensen's lanternfish, is a species of lanternfish found in the Indo-Pacific, the south-eastern Atlantic Ocean and the South China Sea.

== Description ==
This species reaches a length of 5.0 cm (2.0 in).

== Etymology ==
The fish is named in honor of Danish zoologist Adolf Severin Jensen (1866–1953), a member of the committee that edited the oceanographic reports of the Dana expeditions.
