= Diaphus ostenfeldi =

Conservation status
- Least Concern (IUCN 3.1)

Scientific classification
- Kingdom: Animalia
- Phylum: Chordata
- Class: Actinopterygii
- Order: Myctophiformes
- Family: Myctophidae
- Genus: Diaphus
- Species: D. ostenfeldi

Binomial name
- Diaphus ostenfeldi Tåning, 1932

Species of fish

Diaphus ostenfeldi, also known as Ostenfeld's lanternfish, is a species of lanternfish found worldwide.

== Description ==
This species reaches a length of 12.0 cm (4.7 in).

== Etymology ==
The fish is named in honor of the late Carl Hansen Ostenfeld (1873–1931), a Danish botanist and the chairman of the committee that edited the oceanographic reports of the Dana expeditions.
