= Diaphus anderseni =

Conservation status
- Least Concern (IUCN 3.1)

Scientific classification
- Kingdom: Animalia
- Phylum: Chordata
- Class: Actinopterygii
- Order: Myctophiformes
- Family: Myctophidae
- Genus: Diaphus
- Species: D. anderseni

Binomial name
- Diaphus anderseni Tåning, 1932

Species of fish

Diaphus anderseni, also known as Andersen's lantern fish, is a species of lanternfish found in the Atlantic and Indian Oceans.

== Description ==
This species reaches a length of 3.2 cm (1.3 in).

== Etymology ==
The fish is named in honor of Tåning's friend, N. C. Andersen, physician on board the Danish research vessel Dana which embarqued on different cruises in the northern and the southern seas.
