= Taaningichthys minimus =

Scientific classification
- Kingdom: Animalia
- Phylum: Chordata
- Class: Actinopterygii
- Order: Myctophiformes
- Family: Myctophidae
- Genus: Taaningichthys
- Species: T. minimus

Binomial name
- Taaningichthys minimus Tåning, 1928

Species of fish

Taaningichthys minimus is a species of lanternfish.
