= Loweina =

Scientific classification
- Domain: Eukaryota
- Kingdom: Animalia
- Phylum: Chordata
- Class: Actinopterygii
- Order: Myctophiformes
- Family: Myctophidae
- Genus: Loweina; Fowler, 1925

Genus of fishes

Loweina is a small genus of lanternfishes.

== Species ==
There are currently three recognized species in this genus:

- Loweina interrupta (Tåning, 1928)
- Loweina rara (Lütken, 1892) (Laura's lantern fish)
- Loweina terminata Becker, 1964
