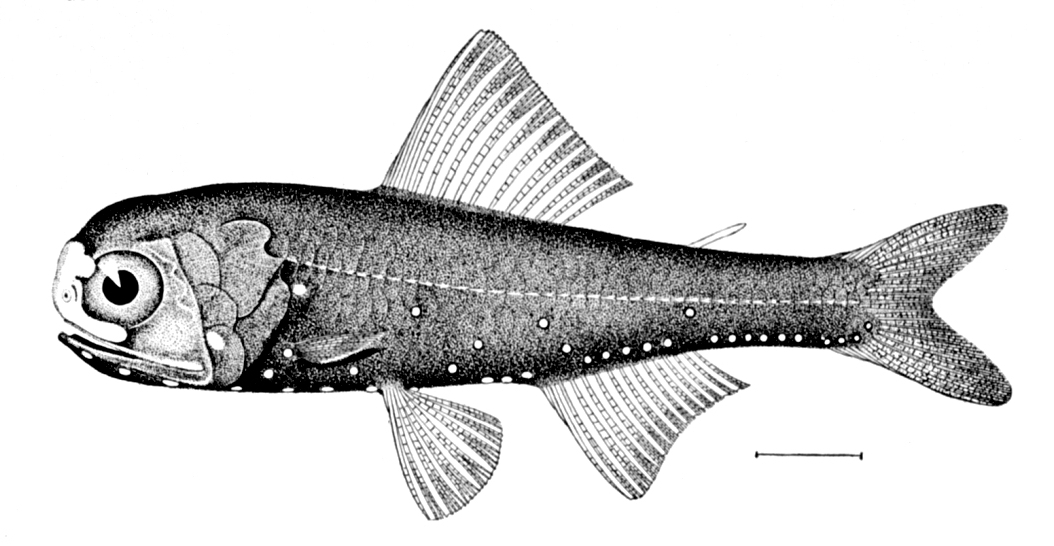
- Spothead lantern fish (D. metopoclampus)

Scientific classification
- Kingdom: Animalia
- Phylum: Chordata
- Class: Actinopterygii
- Order: Myctophiformes
- Family: Myctophidae
- Genus: Diaphus; C. H. Eigenmann & R. S. Eigenmann, 1890

Species
- 79 species (see text)

= Diaphus =

Diaphus Temporal range: 55–0 Ma Early Eocene to present

Genus of fishes

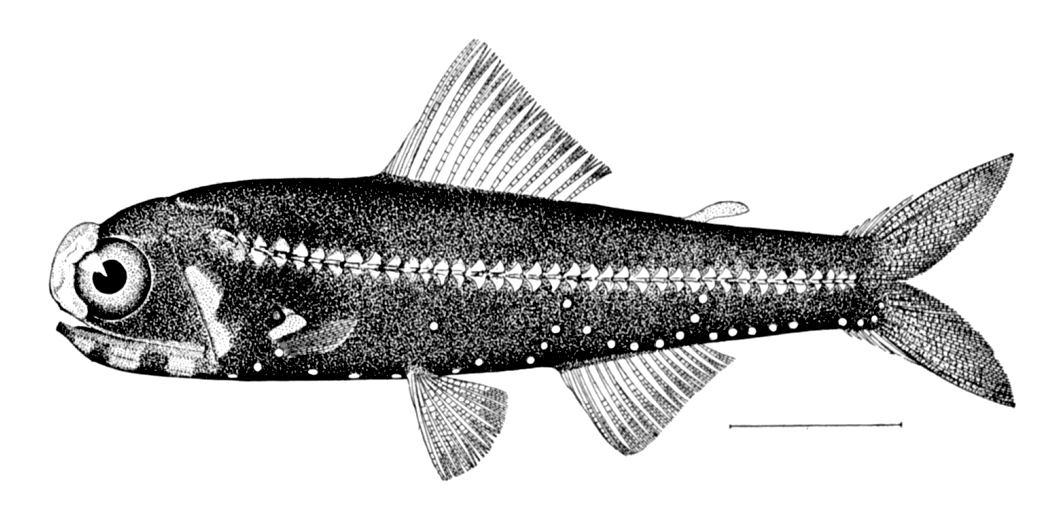
Headlight fish (D. effulgens)

Diaphus is a genus of lanternfishes. It is the most species-rich lanternfish genus.

== Species ==
There are 79 recognized species:

- Diaphus adenomus C. H. Gilbert, 1905 (Gilbert's large lantern fish)
- Diaphus agassizii Gilbert, 1908
- Diaphus aliciae Fowler, 1934
- Diaphus anderseni Tåning, 1932 (Andersen's lantern fish)
- Diaphus antonbruuni B. G. Nafpaktitis, 1978
- Diaphus arabicus B. G. Nafpaktitis, 1978
- Diaphus balanovi Prokofiev, Emelyanova, Orlov & Orlova, 2022
- Diaphus basileusi Becker & Prut'ko, 1984
- Diaphus bertelseni B. G. Nafpaktitis, 1966 (Bertelsen's lanternfish)
- Diaphus brachycephalus Tåning, 1928 (short-headed lantern fish)
- Diaphus burtoni Fowler, 1934
- Diaphus chrysorhynchus C. H. Gilbert & Cramer, 1897 (golden-nosed lantern fish)
- Diaphus coeruleus (Klunzinger, 1871) (blue lantern fish)
- Diaphus confusus Becker, 1992
- Diaphus dahlgreni Fowler, 1934
- Diaphus danae Tåning, 1932 (Dana lanternfish)
- Diaphus dehaveni Fowler, 1934
- Diaphus diadematus Tåning, 1932 (crown lanternfish)
- Diaphus diademophilus B. G. Nafpaktitis, 1978
- Diaphus drachmanni Tåning, 1932 (Drachmann's lanternfish)
- Diaphus dumerilii (Bleeker, 1856)
- Diaphus effulgens (Goode & T. H. Bean, 1896)
- Diaphus ehrhorni Fowler, 1934
- Diaphus faustinoi Fowler, 1934
- Diaphus fragilis Tåning, 1928 (fragile lantern fish)
- Diaphus fulgens (A. B. Brauer, 1904)
- Diaphus garmani C. H. Gilbert, 1906 (Garman's lanternfish)
- Diaphus gigas C. H. Gilbert, 1913
- Diaphus handi Fowler, 1934
- Diaphus holti Tåning, 1918 (small lantern fish)
- Diaphus hudsoni Zurbrigg & W. B. Scott, 1976 (Hudson's lanternfish)
- Diaphus impostor B. G. Nafpaktitis, D. A. Robertson & Paxton, 1995 (imposter lanternfish)
- Diaphus jenseni Tåning, 1932 (Jensen's lanternfish)
- Diaphus kapalae B. G. Nafpaktitis, D. A. Robertson & Paxton, 1995 (Kapala lanternfish)
- Diaphus knappi B. G. Nafpaktitis, 1978
- Diaphus kora B. G. Nafpaktitis, D. A. Robertson & Paxton, 1995
- Diaphus kuroshio Kawaguchi & B. G. Nafpaktitis, 1978
- Diaphus lobatus B. G. Nafpaktitis, 1978
- Diaphus lucidus (Goode & T. H. Bean, 1896) (spotlight lanternfish)
- Diaphus lucifrons Fowler, 1934
- Diaphus luetkeni (A. B. Brauer, 1904) (Luetken's lanternfish)
- Diaphus malayanus M. C. W. Weber, 1913 (Malayan lanternfish)
- Diaphus mascarensis Becker, 1990
- Diaphus meadi B. G. Nafpaktitis, 1978 (Mead's lanternfish)
- Diaphus megalops B. G. Nafpaktitis, 1978
- Diaphus metopoclampus (Cocco, 1829) (spothead lantern fish)
- Diaphus minax B. G. Nafpaktitis, 1968
- Diaphus mollis Tåning, 1928 (soft lanternfish)
- Diaphus nielseni B. G. Nafpaktitis, 1978
- Diaphus ostenfeldi Tåning, 1932 (Ostenfeld's lanternfish)
- Diaphus pacificus A. E. Parr, 1931 (Pacific headlightfish)
- Diaphus pallidus Gjøsæter, 1989
- Diaphus parini Becker, 1992
- Diaphus parri Tåning, 1932 (Parr's lanternfish)
- Diaphus perspicillatus (J. D. Ogilby, 1898) (transparent lantern fish)
- Diaphus phillipsi Fowler, 1934 (Bolin's lantern fish)
- Diaphus problematicus A. E. Parr, 1928 (problematic lanternfish)
- Diaphus rafinesquii (Cocco, 1838) (white-spotted lantern fish)
- Diaphus regani Tåning, 1932 (Regan's lanternfish)
- Diaphus richardsoni Tåning, 1932
- Diaphus rivatoni Bourret, 1985
- Diaphus roei B. G. Nafpaktitis, 1974
- Diaphus sagamiensis C. H. Gilbert, 1913
- Diaphus schmidti Tåning, 1932
- Diaphus signatus C. H. Gilbert, 1908
- Diaphus similis Wisner, 1974
- Diaphus splendidus (A. B. Brauer, 1904) (horned lanternfish)
- Diaphus suborbitalis M. C. W. Weber, 1913
- Diaphus subtilis B. G. Nafpaktitis, 1968
- Diaphus taaningi Norman, 1930
- Diaphus termophilus Tåning, 1928 (Taaning's lantern fish)
- Diaphus theta C. H. Eigenmann & R. S. Eigenmann, 1890 (California headlightfish)
- Diaphus thiollierei Fowler, 1934 (Thiolliere's lanternfish)
- Diaphus trachops Wisner, 1974
- Diaphus umbroculus Fowler, 1934
- Diaphus vanhoeffeni (A. B. Brauer, 1906)
- Diaphus watasei D. S. Jordan & Starks, 1904 (Watases lanternfish)
- Diaphus whitleyi Fowler, 1934
- Diaphus wisneri B. G. Nafpaktitis, D. A. Robertson & Paxton, 1995
