= Diaphus danae =

Conservation status
- Least Concern (IUCN 3.1)

Scientific classification
- Kingdom: Animalia
- Phylum: Chordata
- Class: Actinopterygii
- Order: Myctophiformes
- Family: Myctophidae
- Genus: Diaphus
- Species: D. danae

Binomial name
- Diaphus danae Tåning, 1932

Species of fish

Diaphus danae, also known as Dana lanternfish, is a species of lanternfish found in the Atlantic and Indian Oceans.

== Description ==
This species reaches a length of 12.6 cm (5.0 in).

== Etymology ==
The fish is named in honor of the Danish research vessel Dana, from which the type specimen was collected.
