= Diaphus diadematus =

Conservation status
- Least Concern (IUCN 3.1)

Scientific classification
- Kingdom: Animalia
- Phylum: Chordata
- Class: Actinopterygii
- Order: Myctophiformes
- Family: Myctophidae
- Genus: Diaphus
- Species: D. diadematus

Binomial name
- Diaphus diadematus Tåning, 1932

Species of fish

Diaphus diadematus, the crown lanternfish, is a species of lanternfish found worldwide.

== Description ==
This species reaches a length of 4.2 cm (1.7 in).
