= Diaphus brachycephalus =

Conservation status
- Least Concern (IUCN 3.1)

Scientific classification
- Kingdom: Animalia
- Phylum: Chordata
- Class: Actinopterygii
- Order: Myctophiformes
- Family: Myctophidae
- Genus: Diaphus
- Species: D. brachycephalus

Binomial name
- Diaphus brachycephalus Tåning, 1932

Species of fish

Diaphus brachycephalus, the short-headed lantern fish, is a species of lanternfish found worldwide.

== Description ==
This species reaches a length of 6.0 cm (2.4 in).
