= Diaphus parri =

Conservation status
- Least Concern (IUCN 3.1)

Scientific classification
- Kingdom: Animalia
- Phylum: Chordata
- Class: Actinopterygii
- Order: Myctophiformes
- Family: Myctophidae
- Genus: Diaphus
- Species: D. parri

Binomial name
- Diaphus parri Tåning, 1932

Species of fish

Diaphus parri, also known as Parr's lanternfish, is a species of lanternfish found worldwide.

== Description ==
This species reaches a length of 6.5 cm (2.6 in).

== Etymology ==
The fish is named in honor of marine biologist Albert Eide Parr (1900–1991), because of his contribution to lanternfish taxonomy
