= Diaphus richardsoni =

Conservation status
- Least Concern (IUCN 3.1)

Scientific classification
- Kingdom: Animalia
- Phylum: Chordata
- Class: Actinopterygii
- Order: Myctophiformes
- Family: Myctophidae
- Genus: Diaphus
- Species: D. richardsoni

Binomial name
- Diaphus richardsoni Tåning, 1932

Species of fish

Diaphus richardsoni is a species of lanternfish found worldwide.

== Description ==
This species reaches a length of 6.0 cm (2.4 in).

== Etymology ==
The fish is named in honor of surgeon-naturalist John Richardson (1787–1865), who was the first collector and writer on lanternfishes from the Indo-Pacific.
