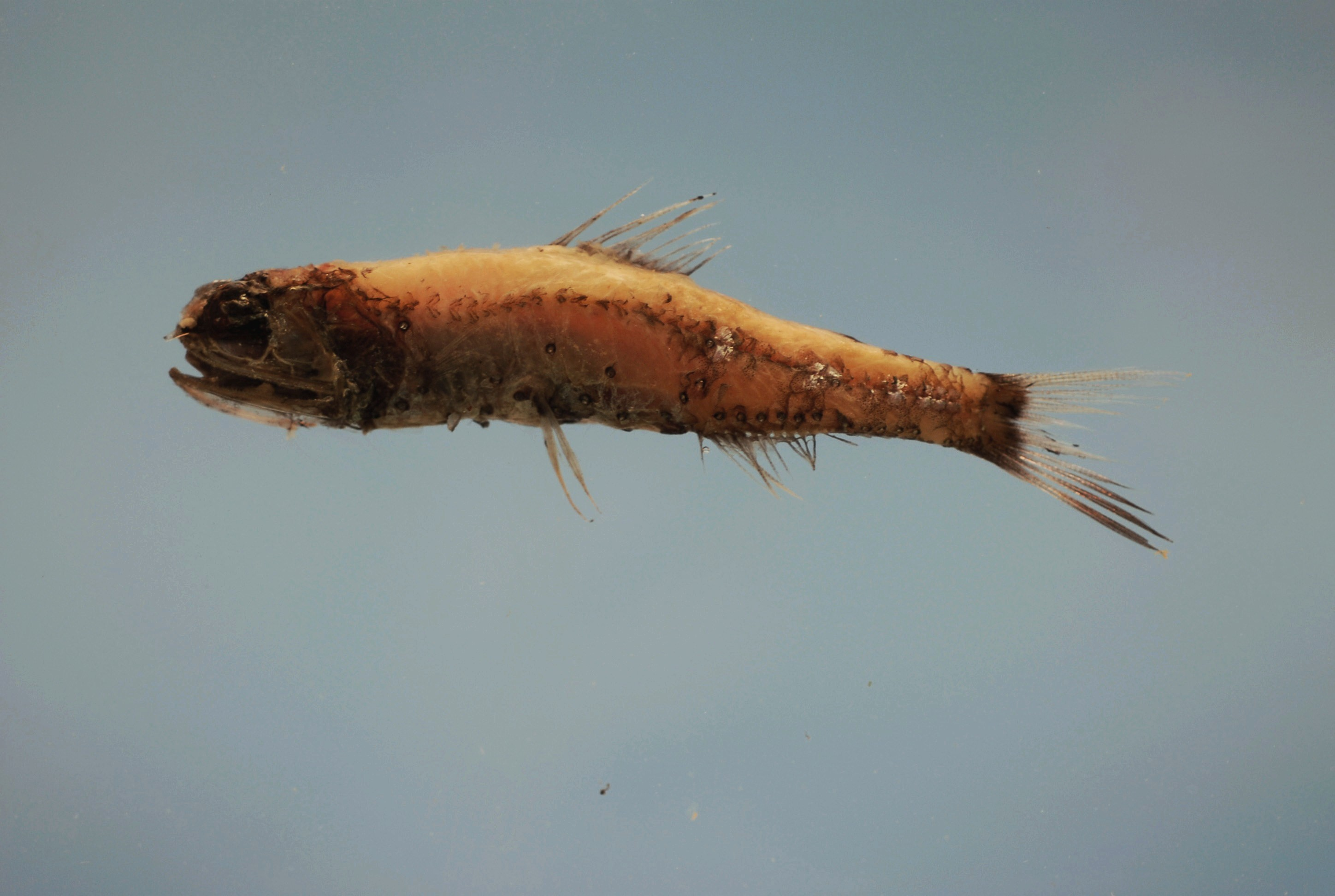

Conservation status
- Least Concern (IUCN 3.1)

Scientific classification
- Kingdom: Animalia
- Phylum: Chordata
- Class: Actinopterygii
- Order: Myctophiformes
- Family: Myctophidae
- Genus: Diaphus
- Species: D. termophilus

Binomial name
- Diaphus termophilus Tåning, 1928

= Diaphus termophilus =

Species of fish

Diaphus termophilus, also known as Taaning's lantern fish, is a species of lanternfish. It occurs in all oceans between about 52°N and 48°S.

== Description ==
This species reaches a standard length of 8.0 cm (3.1 in).
