= Diaphus regani =

Conservation status
- Least Concern (IUCN 3.1)

Scientific classification
- Kingdom: Animalia
- Phylum: Chordata
- Class: Actinopterygii
- Order: Myctophiformes
- Family: Myctophidae
- Genus: Diaphus
- Species: D. regani

Binomial name
- Diaphus regani Tåning, 1932

Species of fish

Diaphus regani, also known as Regan's lanternfish, is a species of lanternfish found in the Atlantic and Indian Oceans.

== Description ==
This species reaches a length of 1.4 cm (0.55 in).

== Etymology ==
The fish is named in honor of ichthyologist Charles Tate Regan (1878–1943), Natural History Museum (London).
