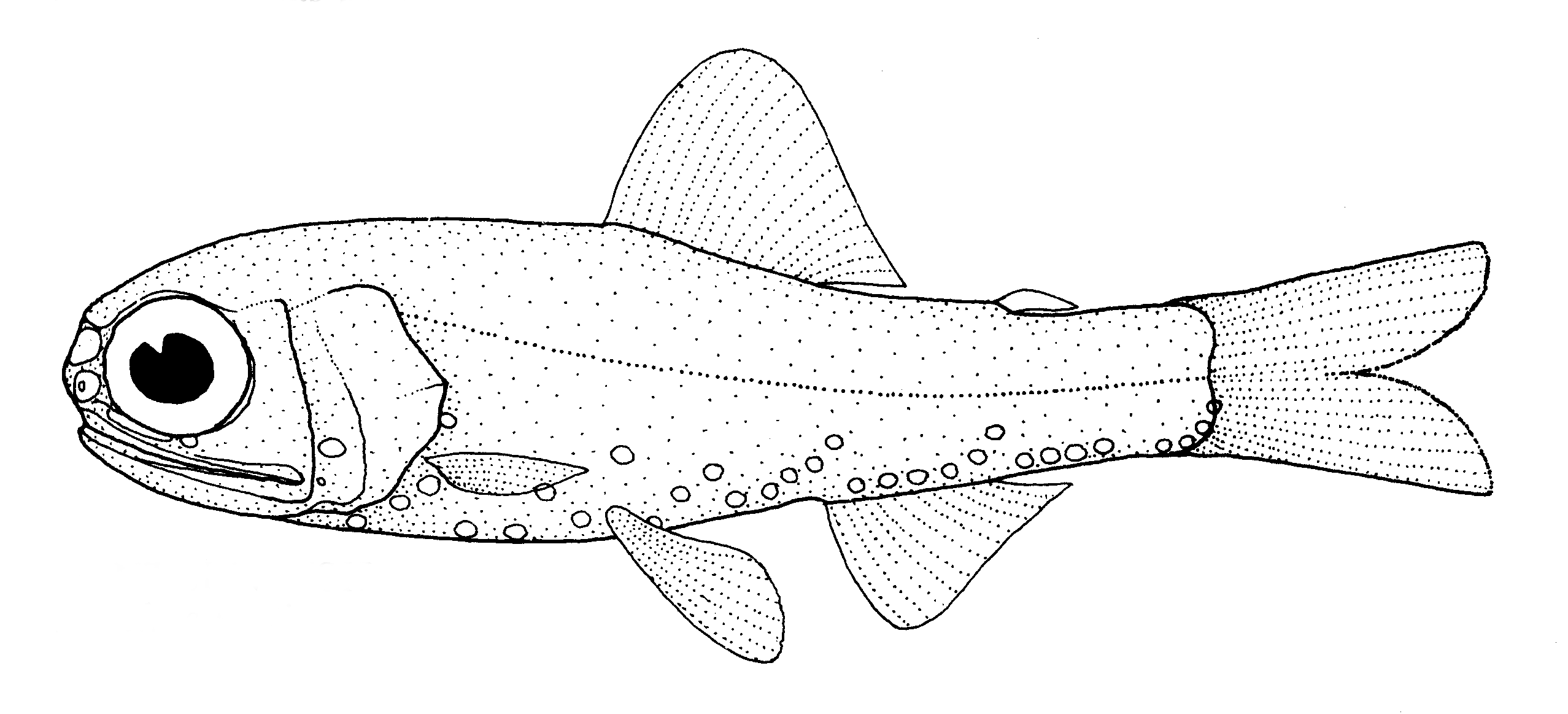
- Drawing by Dr Tony Ayling

Conservation status
- Least Concern (IUCN 3.1)

Scientific classification
- Domain: Eukaryota
- Kingdom: Animalia
- Phylum: Chordata
- Class: Actinopterygii
- Order: Myctophiformes
- Family: Myctophidae
- Genus: Diaphus
- Species: D. holti

Binomial name
- Diaphus holti Tåning, 1918

= Diaphus holti =

Species of fish

Diaphus holti, the Small lanternfish, is a species of lanternfish found in the Atlantic and Indian Oceans. This species grows to a length of 7.0 centimetres (2.8 in) SL.

== Etymology ==
The fish is named in honor of Irish ichthyologist Ernest William Lyons Holt (1864-1922), being the first person who had ever identified a postlarva of the genus Myctophus.
