= Diaphus fragilis =

Conservation status
- Least Concern (IUCN 3.1)

Scientific classification
- Kingdom: Animalia
- Phylum: Chordata
- Class: Actinopterygii
- Order: Myctophiformes
- Family: Myctophidae
- Genus: Diaphus
- Species: D. fragilis

Binomial name
- Diaphus fragilis Tåning, 1932

Species of fish

Diaphus fragilis, the fragile lantern fish, is a species of lanternfish found in tropics worldwide.

== Description ==
This species reaches a length of 12.3 cm (4.8 in).
