= Loweina interrupta =

Scientific classification
- Kingdom: Animalia
- Phylum: Chordata
- Class: Actinopterygii
- Order: Myctophiformes
- Family: Myctophidae
- Genus: Loweina
- Species: L. interrupta

Binomial name
- Loweina interrupta Tåning, 1928

Species of fish

Loweina interrupta is a species of lanternfish.
