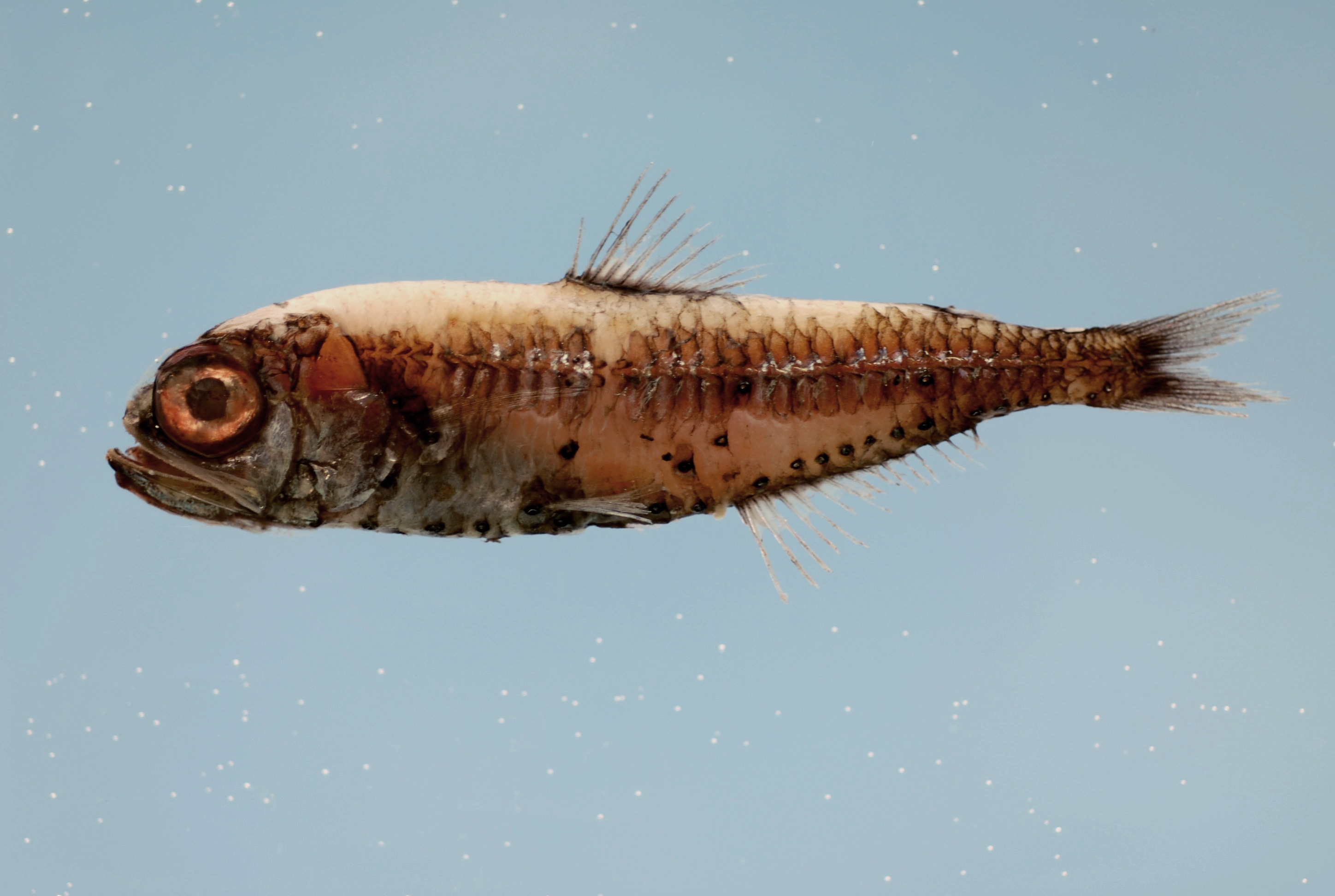

Conservation status
- Least Concern (IUCN 3.1)

Scientific classification
- Kingdom: Animalia
- Phylum: Chordata
- Class: Actinopterygii
- Order: Myctophiformes
- Family: Myctophidae
- Genus: Dasyscopelus
- Species: D. obtusirostris

Binomial name
- Dasyscopelus obtusirostris (Tåning, 1928)

Synonyms
- Myctophum pristilepis obtusirostre Tåning, 1928; Myctophum obtusirostre Tåning, 1928; Myctophum obtusirostrum Tåning, 1928; Myctophum imperceptum Becker & Borodulina, 1971

= Dasyscopelus obtusirostris =

Species of fish

Dasyscopelus obtusirostris, the bluntsnout lanternfish, is a species of lanternfish. It occurs in the Atlantic, Indian, and Pacific Oceans.
