= Diaphus mollis =

Conservation status
- Least Concern (IUCN 3.1)

Scientific classification
- Kingdom: Animalia
- Phylum: Chordata
- Class: Actinopterygii
- Order: Myctophiformes
- Family: Myctophidae
- Genus: Diaphus
- Species: D. mollis

Binomial name
- Diaphus mollis Tåning, 1928

Species of fish

Diaphus mollis, the soft lanternfish, is a species of lanternfish found in the Atlantic and Indian Oceans.

== Description ==
This species reaches a length of 6.6 cm (2.6 in).
