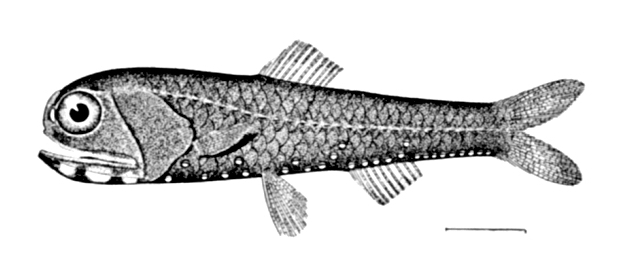

Conservation status
- Least Concern (IUCN 3.1)

Scientific classification
- Kingdom: Animalia
- Phylum: Chordata
- Class: Actinopterygii
- Order: Myctophiformes
- Family: Myctophidae
- Genus: Diaphus
- Species: D. theta

Binomial name
- Diaphus theta C. H. Eigenmann & R. S. Eigenmann, 1890

= Diaphus theta =

Species of fish

Diaphus theta, the California headlightfish, is a species of lanternfish found in the eastern Pacific Ocean.

== Description ==
This species reaches a length of 11.4 cm (4.5 in).
