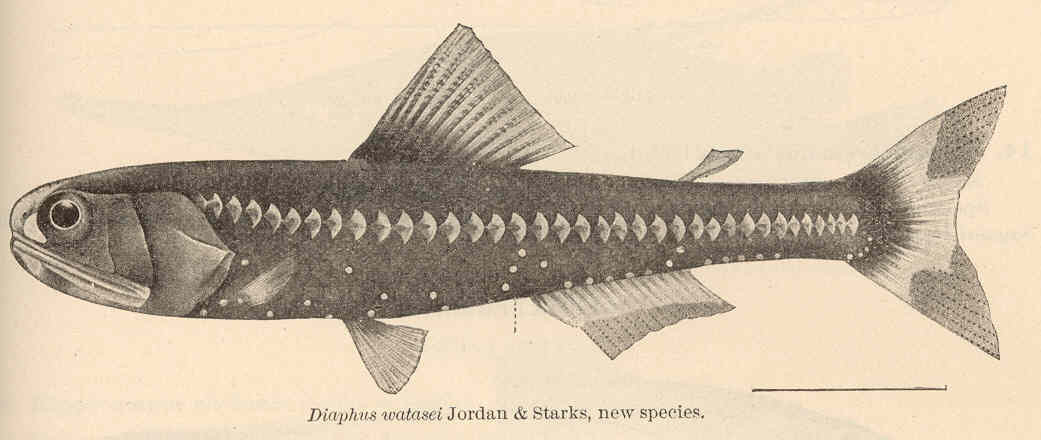

Conservation status
- Least Concern (IUCN 3.1)

Scientific classification
- Kingdom: Animalia
- Phylum: Chordata
- Class: Actinopterygii
- Order: Myctophiformes
- Family: Myctophidae
- Genus: Diaphus
- Species: D. watasei

Binomial name
- Diaphus watasei D. S. Jordan & Starks, 1904

Synonyms
- Myctophum fulgens A. B. Brauer, 1904

= Diaphus watasei =

Species of fish

Diaphus watasei, also known as Watases lanternfish, is a species of lanternfish found in the Indo-west Pacific.

== Description ==
This species reaches a length of 17.0 cm (6.7 in).

== Etymology ==
The fish is named in honor of biologist Shozaburo Watasé (1862–1929), of the Imperial University of Tokyo, who presented the type specimen to Stanford University.
