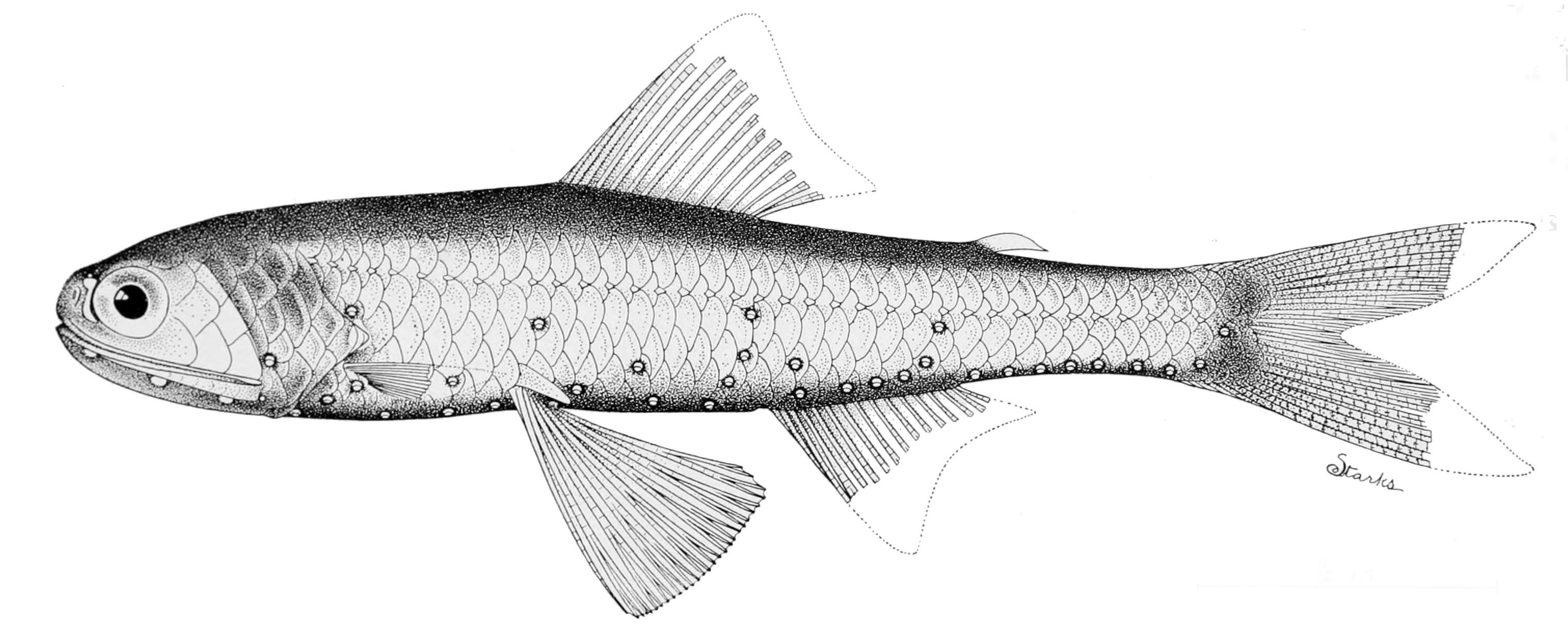

Conservation status
- Least Concern (IUCN 3.1)

Scientific classification
- Kingdom: Animalia
- Phylum: Chordata
- Class: Actinopterygii
- Order: Myctophiformes
- Family: Myctophidae
- Genus: Diaphus
- Species: D. signatus

Binomial name
- Diaphus signatus C. H. Gilbert, 1908

= Diaphus signatus =

Species of fish

Diaphus signatus, the small lanternfish, is a species of lanternfish found in the Indo-Pacific Ocean.

== Description ==
This species reaches a length of 4.0 cm (1.6 in).
