= Samuel Garman =

American zoologist (1843–1927)

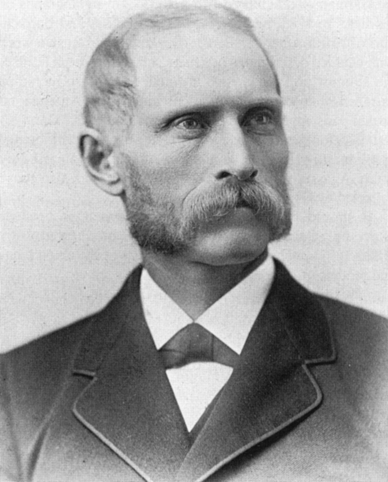
- Born: June 5, 1843; Indiana County, Pennsylvania, United States
- Died: September 30, 1927 (aged 84)
- Spouse: Florence Armstrong (m.1895)
- Scientific career
- Fields: Zoology

Samuel Walton Garman (June 5, 1843 – September 30, 1927), or "Garmann" as he sometimes styled himself, was an American naturalist and zoologist. He became noted as an ichthyologist and herpetologist.

== Biography ==
Garman was born in Indiana County, Pennsylvania, on 5 June 1843. In 1868 he joined an expedition to the American West with John Wesley Powell. He graduated from the Illinois State Normal University in 1870, and for the following year was principal of the Mississippi State Normal School. In 1871, he became professor of natural sciences in Ferry Hall Seminary, Lake Forest, Illinois, and a year later became a special pupil of Louis Agassiz. He was a friend and regular correspondent of the naturalist Edward Drinker Cope, and in 1872 accompanied him on a fossil hunting trip to Wyoming. In 1870 he became assistant director of herpetology and ichthyology at Harvard's Museum of Comparative Zoology. His work was mostly in the classification of fish, especially sharks, but also included reptiles and amphibians. Harvard College awarded him honorary degrees for his scientific work, B.S. in 1898 and A.M. in 1899.

== Personal ==
While working at Harvard, he lived in Arlington Heights, Massachusetts. In 1895, he married Florence Armstrong of Saint John, New Brunswick. They had a daughter.

== Taxa described by him ==
- See Category:Taxa named by Samuel Garman

== Taxa named in his honor ==
- Garman is commemorated in the scientific name of a species of Jamaican lizard, Anolis garmani.
- The Rosette skate Leucoraja garmani (Whitley, 1939) is named after him.
- Diaphus garmani, the Garman's lanternfish, is a species of lanternfish found worldwide.
- Hypostomus garmani is a species of catfish in the family Loricariidae. It is native to South America, where it occurs in the São Francisco River basin.

== Publications (selected) ==
- Garman, Samuel (1883). On the reptiles and Batrachians of North America. Kentucky Geological Survey. doi:10.5962/bhl.title.10754.
- Garman, Samuel (1887). On West Indian Iguanidae and on West Indian Scincidae. Bulletin of the Essex Institute. Vol. 19. doi:10.5962/bhl.title.11968.
- Garman, Samuel (1890). The "Gila Monster". Bulletin of the Essex Institute. Vol. 22. doi:10.5962/bhl.title.12632.
- Garman, Samuel (1892). The Discoboli. Cyclopteridæ, Liparopsidæ, and Liparididæ. Memoirs of the Museum of Comparative Zoology. Vol. 14. Cambridge, Massachusetts: Museum of Comparative Zoology at Harvard College. doi:10.5962/bhl.title.13817.
- Garman, Samuel (1895). The Cyprinodont. Memoirs of the Museum of Comparative Zoology. Vol. 19. Cambridge, Massachusetts: Museum of Comparative Zoology at Harvard College. doi:10.5962/bhl.title.48520.
- Garman, Samuel (1911). The Chismopnea (chimaeroids). Memoirs of the Museum of Comparative Zoology. Vol. 40. Cambridge, Massachusetts: Museum of Comparative Zoology at Harvard College. doi:10.5962/bhl.title.49087.
- Garman, Samuel (1913). The Plagiostomia (Sharks, skates, and rays). Memoirs of the Museum of Comparative Zoology. Vol. 36. Cambridge, Massachusetts: Museum of Comparative Zoology at Harvard College. doi:10.5962/bhl.title.43732.
- Garman, Samuel (1917). The Galapagos tortoises. Memoirs of the Museum of Comparative Zoology. Vol. 30. Cambridge, Massachusetts: Museum of Comparative Zoology at Harvard College. doi:10.5962/bhl.title.41524.
