= Diaphus sagamiensis =

Conservation status
- Least Concern (IUCN 3.1)

Scientific classification
- Kingdom: Animalia
- Phylum: Chordata
- Class: Actinopterygii
- Order: Myctophiformes
- Family: Myctophidae
- Genus: Diaphus
- Species: D. sagamiensis

Binomial name
- Diaphus sagamiensis C. H. Gilbert, 1913

Species of fish

Diaphus sagamiensis is a species of lanternfish found in the north-western Pacific Ocean.

== Etymology ==
The fish is named after Sagami Bay, Japan.
