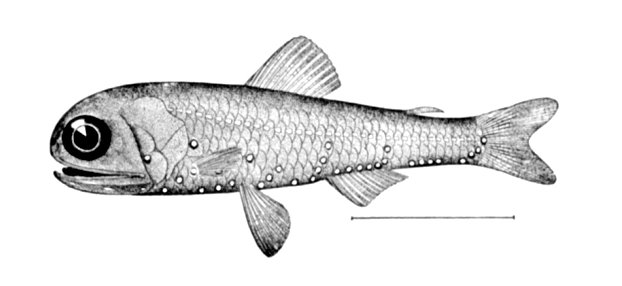

Conservation status
- Least Concern (IUCN 3.1)

Scientific classification
- Kingdom: Animalia
- Phylum: Chordata
- Class: Actinopterygii
- Division: Teleostei
- Order: Myctophiformes
- Family: Myctophidae
- Genus: Diaphus
- Species: D. rafinesquii

Binomial name
- Diaphus rafinesquii (Cocco, 1838)

Synonyms
- Collettia rafinesquei (Cocco, 1838); Collettia rafinesquii (Cocco, 1838); Diaphus intermedius Borodin, 1930; Diaphus rafinesquei (Cocco, 1838); Myctophum rafinesquei (Cocco, 1838); Myctophum rafinesquii (Cocco, 1838); Nyctophus rafinesquii Cocco, 1838; Scopelus rafinesqui (Cocco, 1838); Scopelus rafinesquii (Cocco, 1838)

= White-spotted lantern fish =

Species of fish

The white-spotted lantern fish (Diaphus rafinesquii), also called Rafinesque's lanternfish, is a species of fish in the family Myctophidae.

== Etymology ==
Its specific name refers to the polymath Constantine Samuel Rafinesque (1783–1840).

The name "doormat parkinglightfish" was coined by D. E. McAllister in his 1990 book A List of the Fishes of Canada, being one of many common names he conceived in the book (French: lampe-veilleuse pailasson). These common names were subsequently used in the Encyclopedia of Canadian Fishes by Brian W. Coad. In a review of Coad's book, Erling Holm remarked that many of the names coined by Mcallister differed significantly from the standard set by Robins et al., deemed widely accepted, and promoted by the Committee on Names of Fishes. For the names of deep-sea fish (including "doormat parkinglightfish"), which are unlikely to have day-to-day use, Holm deemed the names "unnecessarily complex, easily misspelled, or downright silly".

== Description ==
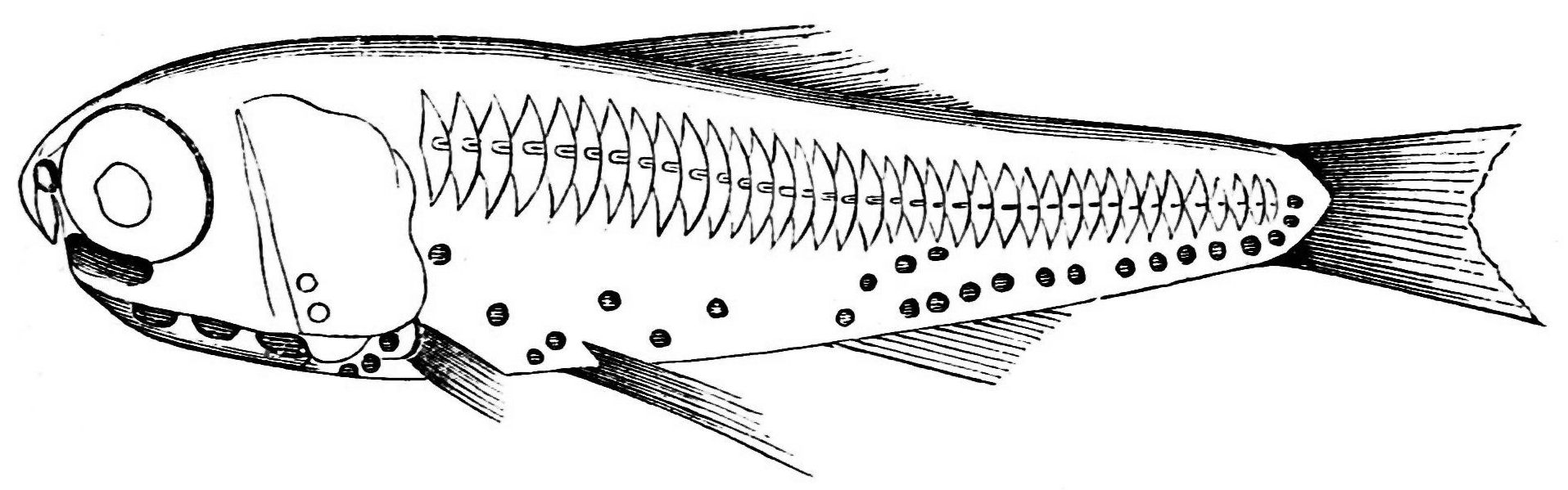
Diagram of Diaphus rafinesquii, with photophores indicated

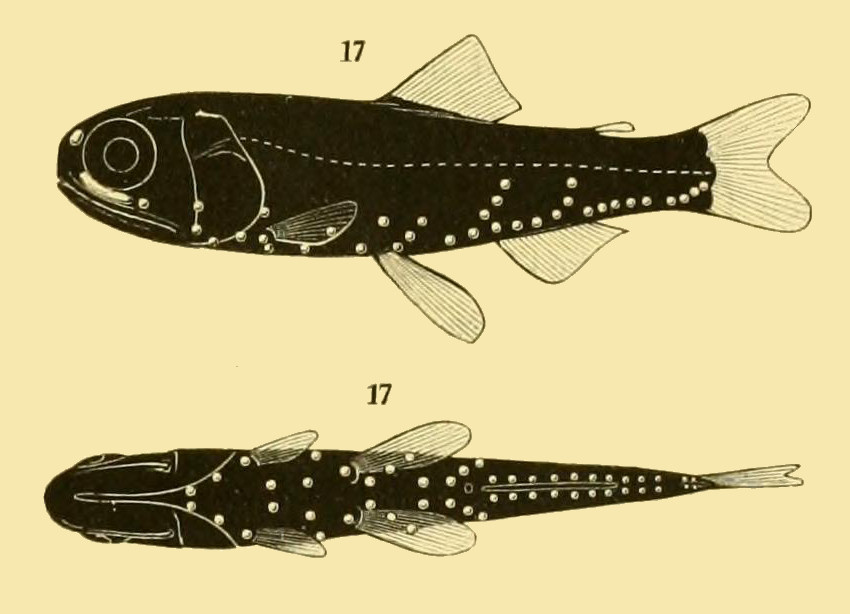
Lateral and dorsal views

The white-spotted lantern fish is silvery in colour, spotted with photophores, with a maximum length of 9 cm (3.5 in).

== Habitat ==
Diaphus rafinesquii is bathypelagic or mesopelagic and oceanodromous, living at depths of 40–2,173 m (131–7,129 ft) in the Atlantic Ocean, Mediterranean Sea, Gulf of Mexico and Caribbean Sea. During the day, it is typically found at 325–750 m (1,066–2,461 ft) and at night, the adults are at 300–600 m (980–1,970 ft) and the young at 40–200 m (130–660 ft).

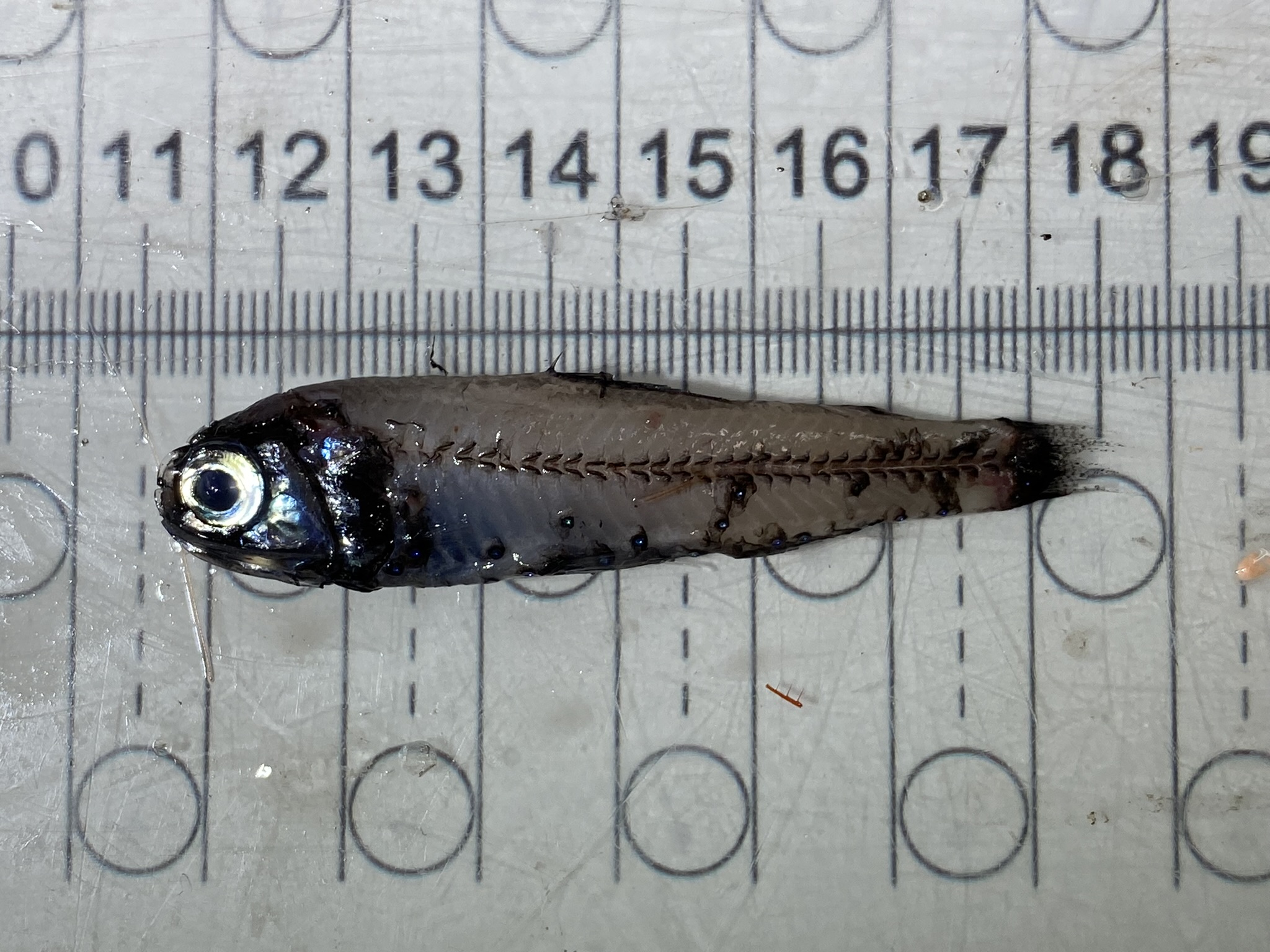
Freshly-caught specimen of Diaphus rafinesquii.

== Behaviour ==
Males are slightly larger; spawning is in autumn and winter.
