= Tachynectes =

Tachynectes Temporal range: Turonian - Campanian

Scientific classification
- Domain: Eukaryota
- Kingdom: Animalia
- Phylum: Chordata
- Class: Actinopterygii
- Order: Myctophiformes
- Family: Myctophidae
- Genus: †Tachynectes von der Marck, 1863

Type species
- †Tachynectes macrodactylus von der Marck, 1863

Species
- †T. macrodactylus (von der Marck, 1863); †T. longipes von der Marck, 1863; †T. brachypterygius von der Marck, 1863

Extinct genus of fishes

Tachynectes is an extinct genus of prehistoric ray-finned fish that lived from the Turonian to the Campanian.

== Description ==
Tachynectes is characterized by enlarged pectoral fins, which are supported by 11-12 fin rays and are disconnected from the body outside of their bases. Its spine consists of a varying number of vertebrae, ranging from 76 to 81, which are not visually distinguishable between abdominal and caudal vertebrae.

== See also ==
- Prehistoric fish
- List of prehistoric bony fish
