= Loweina terminata =

Scientific classification
- Domain: Eukaryota
- Kingdom: Animalia
- Phylum: Chordata
- Class: Actinopterygii
- Order: Myctophiformes
- Family: Myctophidae
- Genus: Loweina
- Species: L. terminata

Binomial name
- Loweina terminata Becker, 1964

Species of fish

Loweina terminata is a species of lanternfish.
