= Diaphus phillipsi =

Conservation status
- Least Concern (IUCN 3.1)

Scientific classification
- Kingdom: Animalia
- Phylum: Chordata
- Class: Actinopterygii
- Order: Myctophiformes
- Family: Myctophidae
- Genus: Diaphus
- Species: D. phillipsi

Binomial name
- Diaphus phillipsi Fowler, 1934

Species of fish

Diaphus phillipsi, also known as Bolin's lantern fish, is a species of lanternfish found in the Indo-Pacific.

== Description ==
This species reaches a length of 7.7 cm (3.0 in).

== Etymology ==
The fish is named in honor of the late Dr. Richard J. Phillips of Philadelphia, who collected many of the local fishes for Fowler.
