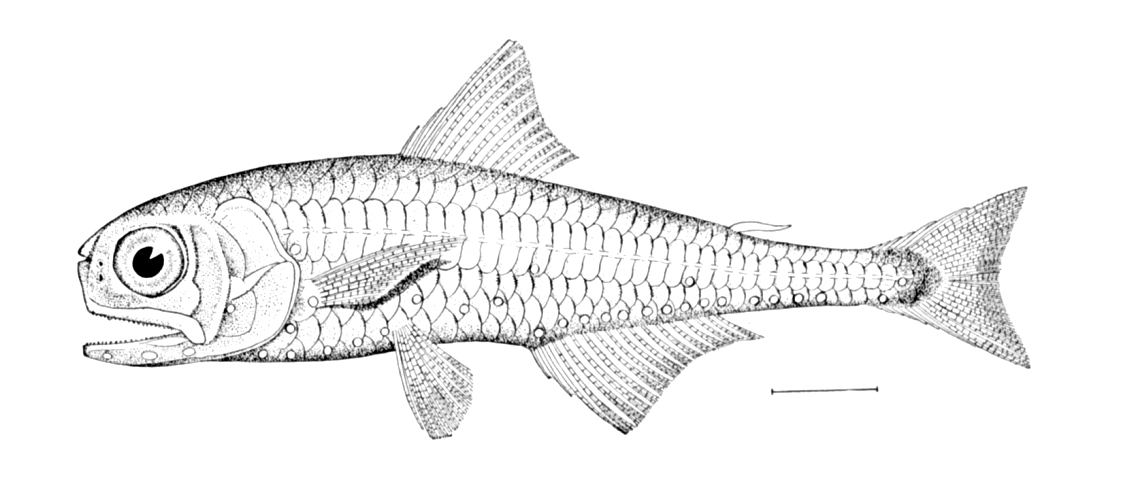

Conservation status
- Least Concern (IUCN 3.1)

Scientific classification
- Kingdom: Animalia
- Phylum: Chordata
- Class: Actinopterygii
- Order: Myctophiformes
- Family: Myctophidae
- Genus: Dasyscopelus
- Species: D. asper

Binomial name
- Dasyscopelus asper (J. Richardson, 1845)

Synonyms
- Myctophum asperum Richardson, 1845; Scopelus asper (Richardson, 1845); Dasyscopelus naufragus Waite, 1904

= Dasyscopelus asper =

Species of fish

Dasyscopelus asper, previously Myctophum asperum, common name the prickly lanternfish, is a species of deep sea fish in the family Myctophidae, the "lanternfish".

== Description ==
This species has large eyes and grows to a maximum total length of approximately 8.5 cm (3.3 in).

== Distribution ==
Dasyscopelus asper is found in the following regions:

- Western Atlantic Ocean from 20° north to Brazil, and also occurs in the Gulf of Mexico.
- Eastern Atlantic Ocean, occurring from Mauritania to South Africa in the Agulhas water pockets.
- Northwest Atlantic near Canada.
- Indo-Pacific in the following currents:

- North and south equatorial currents
- Equatorial countercurrents
- East Australian and Agulhas currents

- Eastern Central Pacific.
- South China Sea and East China Sea

Larvae have also been found in the Taiwan Strait.

== Habitat ==
This species is found at depths of between 425 and 750 metres during the day. At night it can ascend to depths of 125 metres to feed on plankton.
