= Solivomer =

Conservation status
- Least Concern (IUCN 3.1)

Scientific classification
- Kingdom: Animalia
- Phylum: Chordata
- Class: Actinopterygii
- Order: Myctophiformes
- Family: Neoscopelidae
- Genus: Solivomer; R. R. Miller, 1947
- Species: S. arenidens

Binomial name
- Solivomer arenidens R. R. Miller, 1947

Species of fish

Solivomer arenidens is a species of blackchin only known from the waters around the Philippines where they are known from around 1,413 metres (4,636 ft).
