= Diaphus problematicus =

Conservation status
- Least Concern (IUCN 3.1)

Scientific classification
- Kingdom: Animalia
- Phylum: Chordata
- Class: Actinopterygii
- Order: Myctophiformes
- Family: Myctophidae
- Genus: Diaphus
- Species: D. problematicus

Binomial name
- Diaphus problematicus A. E. Parr, 1928

Species of fish

Diaphus problematicus, the problematic lanternfish, is a species of lanternfish found worldwide.

== Description ==
This species reaches a length of 10.5 cm (4.1 in).
