= Diaphus pacificus =

Conservation status
- Least Concern (IUCN 3.1)

Scientific classification
- Kingdom: Animalia
- Phylum: Chordata
- Class: Actinopterygii
- Order: Myctophiformes
- Family: Myctophidae
- Genus: Diaphus
- Species: D. pacificus

Binomial name
- Diaphus pacificus A. E. Parr, 1931

Species of fish

Diaphus pacificus, the Pacific headlightfish, is a species of lanternfish found in the Pacific Ocean.
