= Diaphus malayanus =

Conservation status
- Least Concern (IUCN 3.1)

Scientific classification
- Kingdom: Animalia
- Phylum: Chordata
- Class: Actinopterygii
- Order: Myctophiformes
- Family: Myctophidae
- Genus: Diaphus
- Species: D. malayanus

Binomial name
- Diaphus malayanus M. C. W. Weber, 1913

Species of fish

Diaphus malayanus, the Malayan lanternfish, is a species of lanternfish found in the western Pacific Ocean.

== Description ==
This species reaches a length of 4.5 cm (1.8 in).

== Etymology ==
The fish is named because it was found in the Malay Archipelago.
