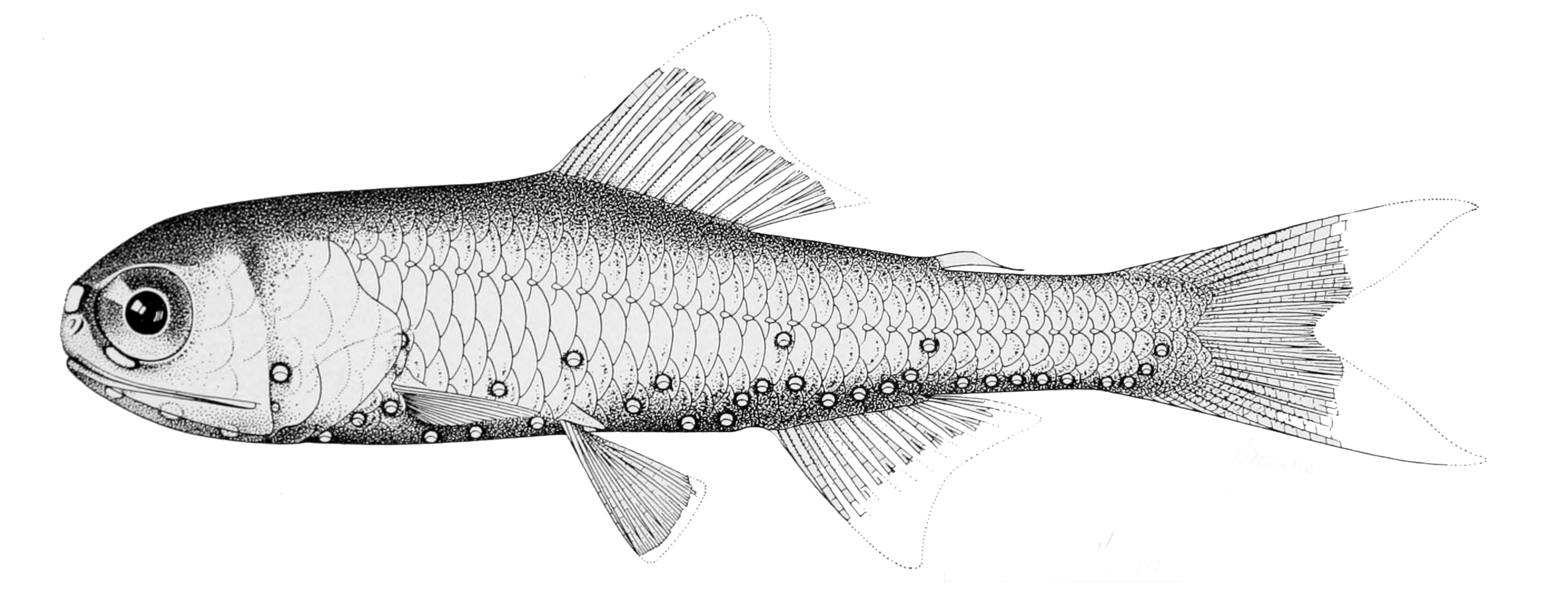

Conservation status
- Least Concern (IUCN 3.1)

Scientific classification
- Kingdom: Animalia
- Phylum: Chordata
- Class: Actinopterygii
- Order: Myctophiformes
- Family: Myctophidae
- Genus: Diaphus
- Species: D. fulgens

Binomial name
- Diaphus fulgens (A. B. Brauer, 1904)

Synonyms
- Myctophum fulgens A. B. Brauer, 1904

= Diaphus fulgens =

Species of fish

Diaphus fulgens is a species of lanternfish found in the Indo-Pacific Ocean.

== Description ==
This species reaches a length of 4.5 cm (1.8 in).
