= Taaningichthys paurolychnus =

Scientific classification
- Domain: Eukaryota
- Kingdom: Animalia
- Phylum: Chordata
- Class: Actinopterygii
- Order: Myctophiformes
- Family: Myctophidae
- Genus: Taaningichthys
- Species: T. paurolychnus

Binomial name
- Taaningichthys paurolychnus Davy, 1972

Species of fish

Taaningichthys paurolychnus is a species of lanternfish.
