= Diaphus garmani =

Conservation status
- Least Concern (IUCN 3.1)

Scientific classification
- Kingdom: Animalia
- Phylum: Chordata
- Class: Actinopterygii
- Order: Myctophiformes
- Family: Myctophidae
- Genus: Diaphus
- Species: D. garmani

Binomial name
- Diaphus garmani C. H. Gilbert, 1906

Species of fish

Diaphus garmani, also known as Garman's lanternfish, is a species of lanternfish found worldwide.

== Description ==
This species reaches a length of 6.0 cm (2.4 in).

== Etymology ==
The fish is named in honor of Harvard ichthyologist-herpetologist Samuel Garman (1843–1927).
