= Diaphus suborbitalis =

Conservation status
- Least Concern (IUCN 3.1)

Scientific classification
- Kingdom: Animalia
- Phylum: Chordata
- Class: Actinopterygii
- Order: Myctophiformes
- Family: Myctophidae
- Genus: Diaphus
- Species: D. suborbitalis

Binomial name
- Diaphus suborbitalis M. C. W. Weber, 1913

Species of fish

Diaphus suborbitalis is a species of lanternfish found in the Indo-Western Pacific Ocean.

== Description ==
This species reaches a length of 7.3 cm (2.9 in).
