= Diaphus perspicillatus =

Conservation status
- Least Concern (IUCN 3.1)

Scientific classification
- Kingdom: Animalia
- Phylum: Chordata
- Class: Actinopterygii
- Order: Myctophiformes
- Family: Myctophidae
- Genus: Diaphus
- Species: D. perspicillatus

Binomial name
- Diaphus perspicillatus (J. D. Ogilby, 1898)

Synonyms
- List: Aethoprora perspicillata Ogilby, 1898; Collettia perspicillata (Ogilby, 1898); Diaphus perspicullata (Ogilby, 1898); Myctophum elucens Brauer, 1904; Diaphus elucens (Brauer, 1904)

Species of fish

Diaphus perspicillatus, the transparent lantern fish, is a species of lanternfish found worldwide.

== Description ==
This species reaches a length of 10.4 cm (4.1 in).
