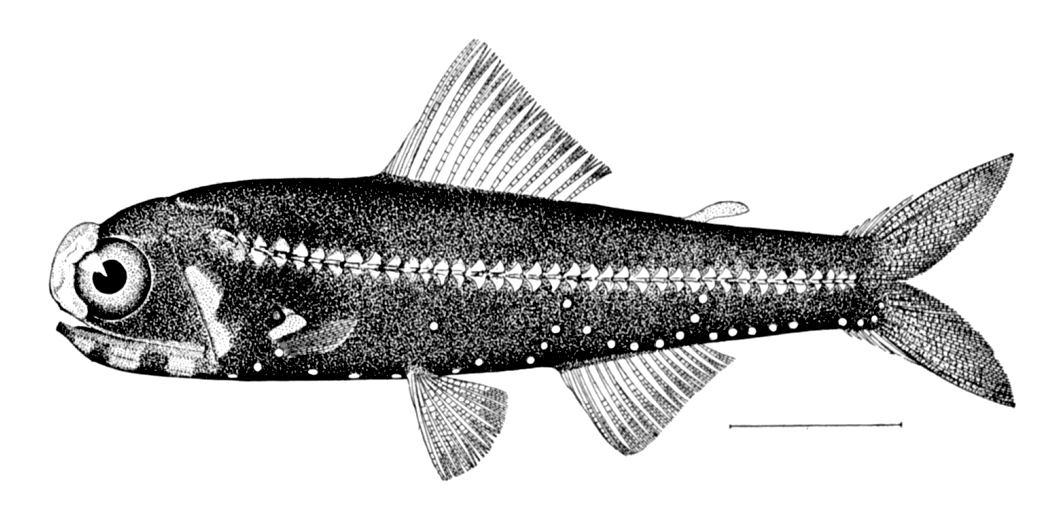
- An illustration of the headlight fish, in the 1896 edition of Oceanic Ichthyology by Goode and Bean
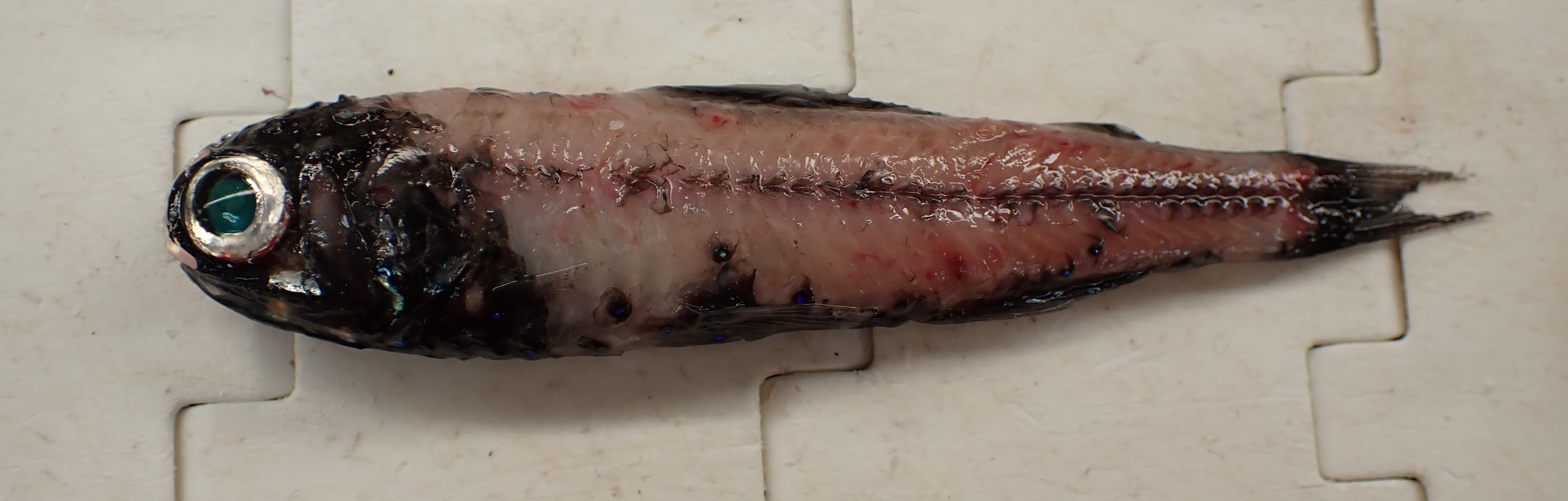
- Freshly caught specimen of D. effulgens from the North-East Atlantic. Approximately 10cm in length.

Conservation status
- Least Concern (IUCN 3.1)

Scientific classification
- Kingdom: Animalia
- Phylum: Chordata
- Class: Actinopterygii
- Division: Teleostei
- Order: Myctophiformes
- Family: Myctophidae
- Genus: Diaphus
- Species: D. effulgens

Binomial name
- Diaphus effulgens (Goode and Bean, 1896)

Synonyms
- Aethoprora effulgens Goode and Bean, 1896; Myctophum effulgens (Goode and Bean, 1896); Myctophum aeolochrus (Barnard, 1927); Diaphus macrophus (Parr, 1928); Diaphus antelucens (Kulikova, 1961)

= Headlight fish =

Species of lanternfish

The headlight fish (Diaphus effulgens) is a species of lanternfish in the family Myctophidae. It is also sometimes referred to as the headlight lanternfish, or even the lanternfish, though it is not the only species to be called this.

== Description ==
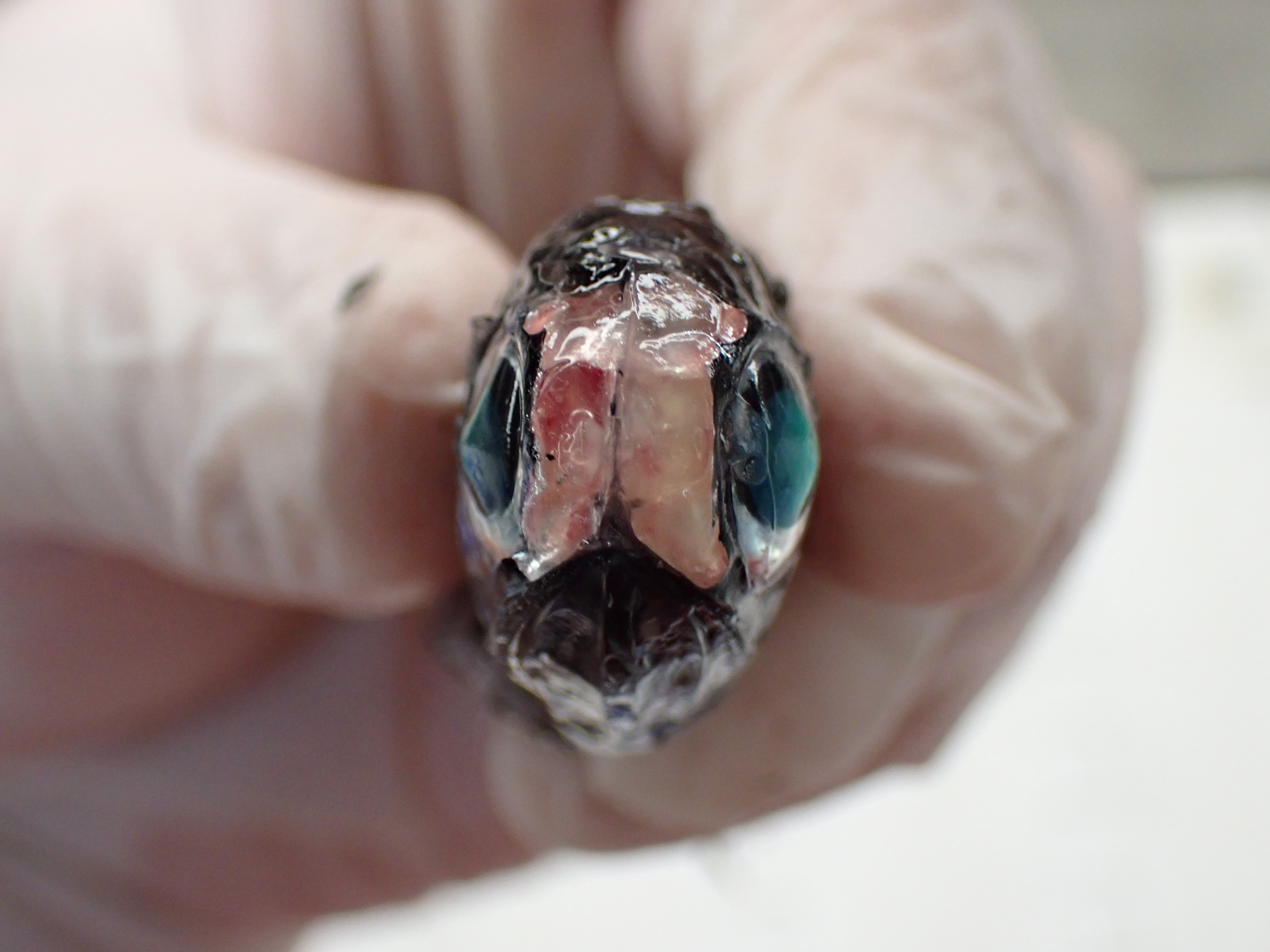
Anterior view of Diaphus effulgens showing the huge light organs characteristic of this species.

This species can be distinguished from other deepwater fishes such as the lanternfish Myctophum affine and from Pearlsides (in the genus Maurolicus) by the large luminescent patch (from which the headlight fish gets its name) that covers the front of its head, between the nares. The maximum reported length for this species is 15 cm (5.9 in).

== Taxonomy and naming ==
The headlight fish was first described by American ichthyologists George Brown Goode and Tarleton Hoffman Bean in 1896. It was originally placed in the genus Aethoprora, which has since been synonymized into the headlight fish's current genus Diaphus.

The generic name, Diaphus, is a combination of the Greek words Dia (Δία), meaning "through", and Physa (Φυσα), "bellows". The species name, effulgens, is a Latin word meaning glittering or flashing.

== Distribution and habitat ==
The range of the headlight fish covers the Atlantic, Pacific, and Indian Oceans. In the eastern Atlantic, they are known from the Antarctic Convergence zone in the south to the English Channel in the north. In the western Atlantic, they can be found from the east coast of the United States south to the southern border of Brazil. In the Indian Ocean they are generally found from about 70°E to between 5°S and 38°S. In the Pacific, they are known from 0° to 29°N, and are also seen in waters near Southeast Asia, Australia, and New Zealand.

The species is both high-oceanic and mesopelagic. During daylight, the fish are found in deep water, from depths of 501 to 700 metres (1,640 to 2,300 ft), but at night they come up nearer the surface and have been observed from depths of 40 to 175 metres (130 to 570 ft). There is some size stratification with depth, and the female fish are believed to spawn in deep water.
