= Diaphus basileusi =

Conservation status
- Data Deficient (IUCN 3.1)

Scientific classification
- Kingdom: Animalia
- Phylum: Chordata
- Class: Actinopterygii
- Order: Myctophiformes
- Family: Myctophidae
- Genus: Diaphus
- Species: D. basileusi

Binomial name
- Diaphus basileusi Becker & Prut'ko, 1984

Species of fish

Diaphus basileusi is a species of lanternfish found in the western Indian Ocean.

== Description ==
This species reaches a length of 13.0 cm (5.1 in).

== Etymology ==
The fish is named in honor of Basil Nafpaktitis (1929–2015), because of his investigations of myctophid systematics, especially of the genus Diaphus.
