= Ernest William Lyons Holt =

British soldier and scientist (1864–1922)

E. W. L. Holt

Ernest William Lyons Holt or E. W. L. Holt (17 October 1864 – 10 June 1922) was an English marine naturalist and biologist who specialized in ichthyology, the study of fish. His work helped lay a scientific foundation for the fishery management in Ireland, and together with William Spotswood Green, he strongly influenced the development of the Irish Fisheries in its early years.

== Early life ==
Holt was born in London and was educated at Eton, where he won a prize in biology. After school, he decided on a career in the British Army, enrolling at the Royal Military College, Sandhurst, and after completing his officer training was commissioned into the Duke of Cornwall's Light Infantry. He participated in the Nile Campaign (1884–85) and then in the Third Burmese War of 1886–87. During that latter campaign, he fell sick and was invalided home. Back in civilian life, Holt began studying zoology at the University of St Andrews in 1888.

== Ichthyological studies ==
Two years later, he participated as assistant-naturalist in a fishery survey on the west coast of Ireland, organized by the Royal Dublin Society. This expedition was led by William Spotswood Green, with whom Holt would work together for much of his later career. That survey made Holt's name as an ichthyologist; he published not only several papers on the eggs and the early larval stages of fish but also wrote the general report of the expedition. As a result of Green's and Holt's work, the government instituted a formal program of fishery surveys under the auspice of the newly formed Congested Districts Board in 1892. Green became the board's Chief Inspector of Fisheries, while Holt participated as a scientific advisor, although he would leave Ireland for a few years.

Holt joined the Marine Biological Association (MBA) and worked until 1894 at Grimsby, where he was in charge of a newly opened research station for the North Sea. After a brief stint at the Station zoologique d'Endoume at Marseille he then worked for three years at the Plymouth Marine Laboratory. Nevertheless, E. W. L. Holt maintained his ties with Ireland, and in 1895 he purchased a dismasted brigantine named Saturn for the Royal Dublin Society and had it equipped as a marine biology research station. In 1899, he returned to Ireland, taking charge of the Saturn and her four small auxiliary sailing boats used for sampling. The floating laboratory was stationed in the Connemara district in County Galway; it lay at Ballynakill in winter and was towed to Inishbofin for the summer months. In 1900, the Saturn was transferred to the new Department of Agriculture and Technical Instruction for Ireland. Green became Chief Inspector of its Fisheries Branch; Holt was at first scientific advisor and later, as of 1908, Fisheries Inspector. They were joined by other young biologists, among them Rowland Southern and George Philip Farrar.

With the department's research and fisheries protection vessel Helga they continued their surveys of the west coast of Ireland. In 1908, the ship was replaced by a new one, the Helga II, which was built to the specifications of Green and Holt. With Holt's backing, the new ship participated in the Clare Island Survey of 1909–1911. When that was completed, the Helga II returned to her regular fisheries research and protection duties under the direction of Holt.

== Later life ==
When Green retired in 1914, Holt succeeded him as Chief Inspector. Scientific work was stopped when World War I broke out, and the administrative duties of his post did not allow Holt to continue research work of his own. After the war, the political changes in Ireland as well as Holt's failing health prevented further serious research. In May 1922, Holt became seriously ill and left Dublin for London, where he died on 10 June that year of Bright's disease (an old term for glomerulonephritis, a kidney disease). In 1949, the Ministry of Agriculture, Fisheries & Food (MAFF) put into service a research vessel named after him.

== Taxon described by him ==
- See Category:Taxa named by Ernest William Lyons Holt

== Taxon named in his honor ==
- Diaphus holti, the Small lanternfish, is a species of lanternfish found in the Atlantic and Indian Oceans. Named after him by Åge Vedel Tåning in 1918.
