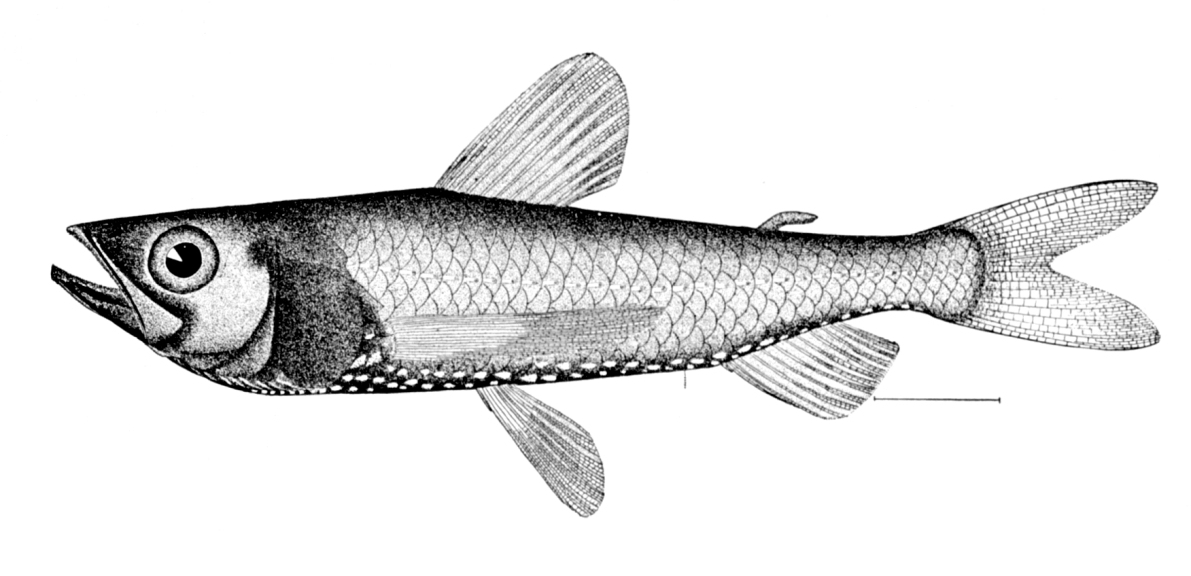
- Large-scaled lanternfish Neoscopelus macrolepidotus

Scientific classification
- Domain: Eukaryota
- Kingdom: Animalia
- Phylum: Chordata
- Class: Actinopterygii
- Order: Myctophiformes
- Family: Neoscopelidae; Danilchenko, 1947

Genera
- Neoscopelus; Scopelengys; Solivomer

= Neoscopelidae =

Neoscopelidae Temporal range: Middle Eocene to present Possible early Ypresian and Late Cretaceous occurrences

Family of fishes

The Neoscopelidae (blackchins or neoscopelids) are a small family of deep-sea fish closely related to the lanternfish. They are found in tropical and subtropical marine waters worldwide.

They can be distinguished from the lanternfish only by a few technical characters, such as the position of the anal fin being far behind that of the dorsal fin. Some species also lack the light-emitting organs (photophores) of the lanternfish. They are typically between 20 and 30 cm (7.9 and 11.8 in) in length. One genus has photophores arranged in a single series along the edge of the tongue and one or two along the ventral surface of the body.

Neoscopelidae currently contains three genera, Neoscopelus, Scopelengys and the monotypic Solivomer (Philippines).

== Species ==
The six known species of neoscopelids are grouped into three genera:

- Neoscopelus
- Scopelengys
- Solivomer

The following fossil genera are also known:

- †Beckerophotus
- †?Neocassandra (potentially in its own family)
- †?Sardinioides (generally placed in own family but may be a neoscopelid)
