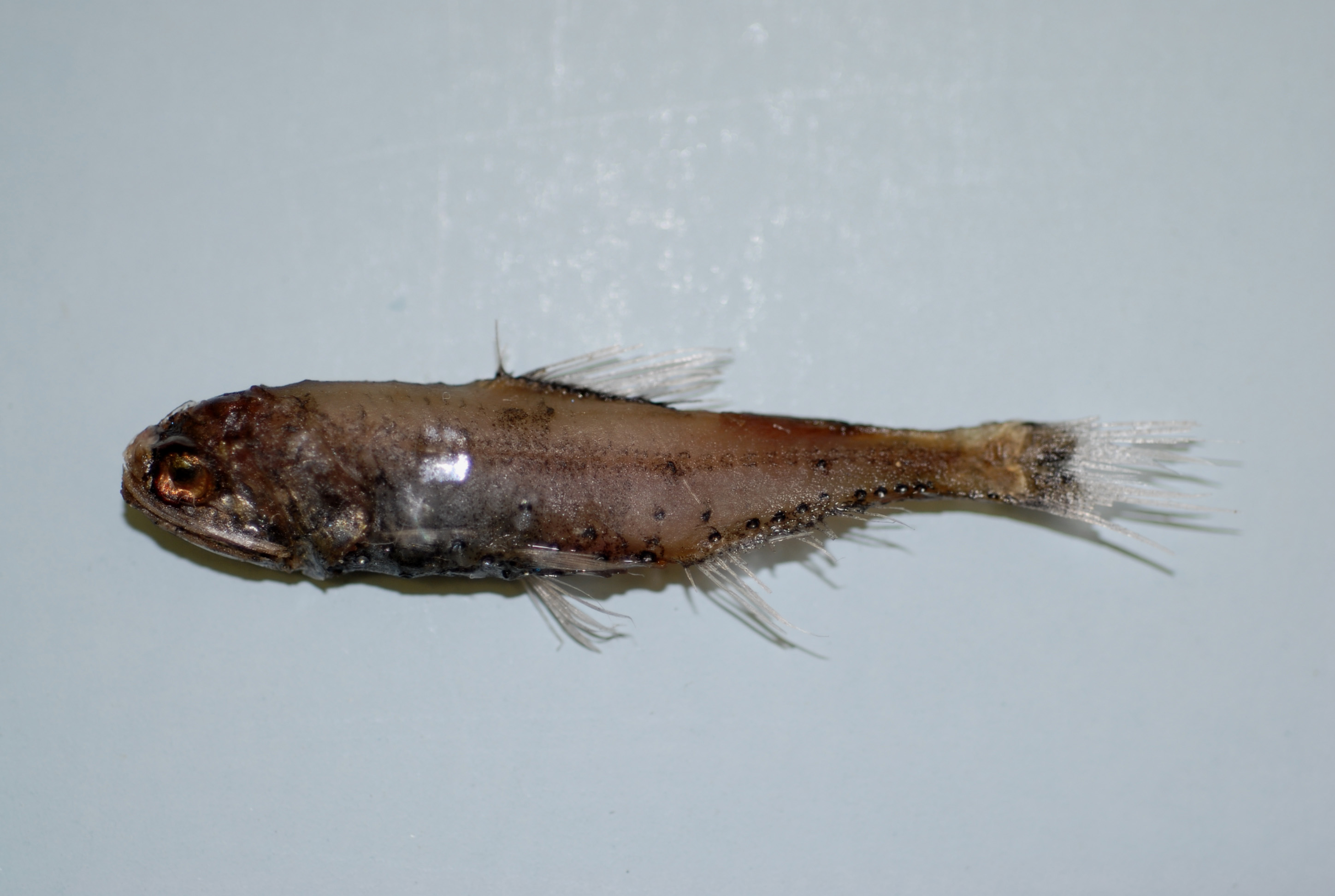

Conservation status
- Least Concern (IUCN 3.1)

Scientific classification
- Kingdom: Animalia
- Phylum: Chordata
- Class: Actinopterygii
- Order: Myctophiformes
- Family: Myctophidae
- Genus: Diaphus
- Species: D. splendidus

Binomial name
- Diaphus splendidus (A. B. Brauer, 1904)

Synonyms
- Myctophum splendidum A. B. Brauer, 1904

= Diaphus splendidus =

Species of fish

Diaphus splendidus, the horned lanternfish, is a species of lanternfish found worldwide.

== Description ==
This species reaches a length of 9.0 cm (3.5 in).
