= Diaphus handi =

Conservation status
- Data Deficient (IUCN 3.1)

Scientific classification
- Kingdom: Animalia
- Phylum: Chordata
- Class: Actinopterygii
- Order: Myctophiformes
- Family: Myctophidae
- Genus: Diaphus
- Species: D. handi

Binomial name
- Diaphus handi Fowler, 1934

Species of fish

Diaphus handi is a species of lanternfish found in the Philippines and the western-central Pacific Ocean.

== Etymology ==
The fish is named in honor of the H. Walker Hand of Cape May, New Jersey, to whom Fowler was indebted for many fishes from the Cape May area.
