= Diaphus dehaveni =

Conservation status
- Data Deficient (IUCN 3.1)

Scientific classification
- Kingdom: Animalia
- Phylum: Chordata
- Class: Actinopterygii
- Order: Myctophiformes
- Family: Myctophidae
- Genus: Diaphus
- Species: D. dehaveni

Binomial name
- Diaphus dehaveni Fowler, 1934

Species of fish

Diaphus dehaveni is a species of lanternfish found in the Philippines and the western-central Pacific Ocean.

== Etymology ==
The fish is named in honor of the Isaac Norris De Haven (1847-1924), a birder and a sportsman from Philadelphia, Pennsylvania, for whom Fowler was thankful for the many local fishes that De Haven provided.
