= Diaphus gigas =

Conservation status
- Least Concern (IUCN 3.1)

Scientific classification
- Kingdom: Animalia
- Phylum: Chordata
- Class: Actinopterygii
- Order: Myctophiformes
- Family: Myctophidae
- Genus: Diaphus
- Species: D. gigas

Binomial name
- Diaphus gigas C. H. Gilbert, 1913

Species of fish

Diaphus gigas is a species of lanternfish found in the northern Pacific Ocean.

== Description ==
This species reaches a length of 17.0 cm (6.7 in).

== Etymology ==
The fish is named in because it is large, at 170 mm TL, the largest species in Gilbert's monograph on the lanternfishes of Japan.
