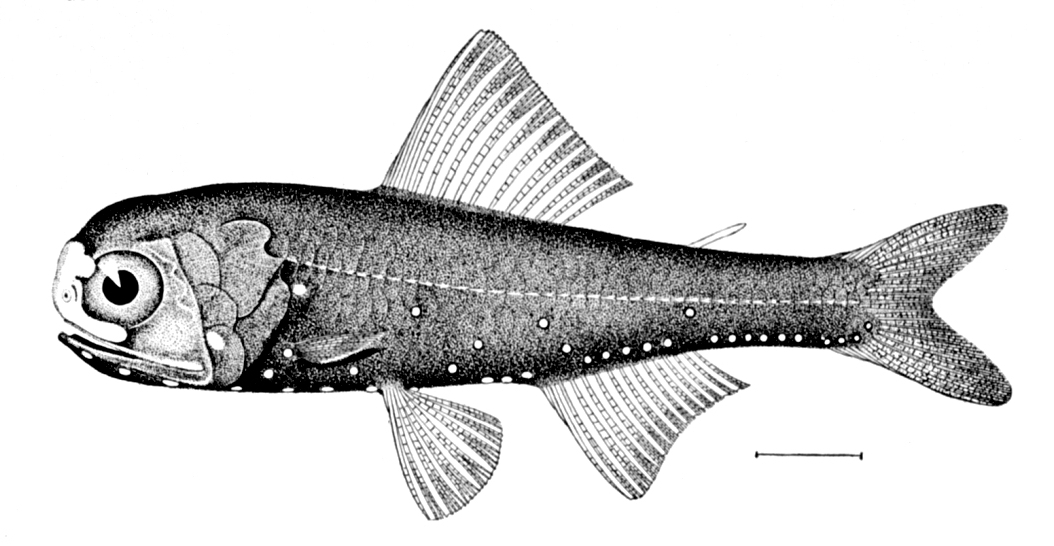

Conservation status
- Least Concern (IUCN 3.1)

Scientific classification
- Kingdom: Animalia
- Phylum: Chordata
- Class: Actinopterygii
- Division: Teleostei
- Order: Myctophiformes
- Family: Myctophidae
- Genus: Diaphus
- Species: D. metopoclampus

Binomial name
- Diaphus metopoclampus (Cocco, 1829)

Synonyms
- Aethoprora metopoclampa Cocco, 1829; Diaphus meteopoclampus Cocco, 1829; Diaphus metopoclampum Cocco, 1829; Myctophum metopoclampum Cocco, 1829; Scopelus metopoclampum Cocco, 1829

= Spothead lantern fish =

Species of fish

The spothead lantern fish (Diaphus metopoclampus), also called the bluntnose lanternfish, is a species of fish in the family Myctophidae (lanternfish).

Its specific name is from Ancient Greek μέτωπον (metōpon, "forehead") and λαμπάς (lampas, "lantern").

== Description ==
The spothead lantern fish is black and pink in colour, with a maximum length of 7.5 cm (3.0 in). It has a deep and short head and prominent photophores in its head.

== Habitat ==
Diaphus metopoclampus is bathypelagic and non-migratory, living at depths of 90–1,085 m (295–3,560 ft) in non-polar seas worldwide, typically on the continental slope.

== Behaviour ==
The spothead lantern fish attains sexual maturity at 4.8 cm (1.9 in) in length; it spawns in the spring and summer.
