= Dasyscopelus brachygnathos =

Conservation status
- Least Concern (IUCN 3.1)

Scientific classification
- Kingdom: Animalia
- Phylum: Chordata
- Class: Actinopterygii
- Order: Myctophiformes
- Family: Myctophidae
- Genus: Dasyscopelus
- Species: D. brachygnathos

Binomial name
- Dasyscopelus brachygnathos (Bleeker, 1856)

Synonyms
- Scopelus brachygnathos; Myctophum brachygnathum

Species of fish

Dasyscopelus brachygnathos, the short-jawed lanternfish, is a species of lanternfish.
