= Diaphus whitleyi =

Conservation status
- Least Concern (IUCN 3.1)

Scientific classification
- Kingdom: Animalia
- Phylum: Chordata
- Class: Actinopterygii
- Order: Myctophiformes
- Family: Myctophidae
- Genus: Diaphus
- Species: D. whitleyi

Binomial name
- Diaphus whitleyi Fowler, 1934

Species of fish

Diaphus whitleyi, is a species of lanternfish found in the Philippines and the western-central Pacific Ocean.

== Etymology ==
The fish is named in honor of Australian ichthyologist-malacologist Gilbert Percy Whitley (1903–1975).
