= Diaphus confusus =

Conservation status
- Data Deficient (IUCN 3.1)

Scientific classification
- Kingdom: Animalia
- Phylum: Chordata
- Class: Actinopterygii
- Order: Myctophiformes
- Family: Myctophidae
- Genus: Diaphus
- Species: D. confusus

Binomial name
- Diaphus confusus Becker, 1992

Species of fish

Diaphus confusus is a species of lanternfish found in the south-eastern Pacific Ocean.
