= Diaphus pallidus =

Conservation status
- Data Deficient (IUCN 3.1)

Scientific classification
- Kingdom: Animalia
- Phylum: Chordata
- Class: Actinopterygii
- Order: Myctophiformes
- Family: Myctophidae
- Genus: Diaphus
- Species: D. pallidus

Binomial name
- Diaphus pallidus Gjøsæter, 1989

Species of fish

Diaphus pallidus is a species of lanternfish found in the western Indian Ocean.
