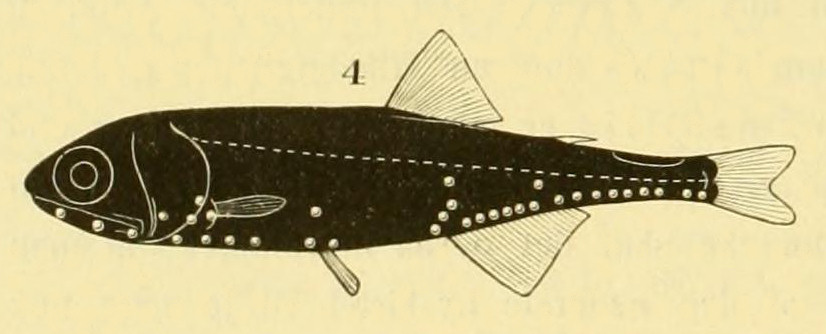

Scientific classification
- Kingdom: Animalia
- Phylum: Chordata
- Class: Actinopterygii
- Order: Myctophiformes
- Family: Myctophidae
- Genus: Loweina
- Species: L. rara

Binomial name
- Loweina rara Lütken, 1892

= Loweina rara =

Species of fish

Loweina rara is a species of lanternfish.
