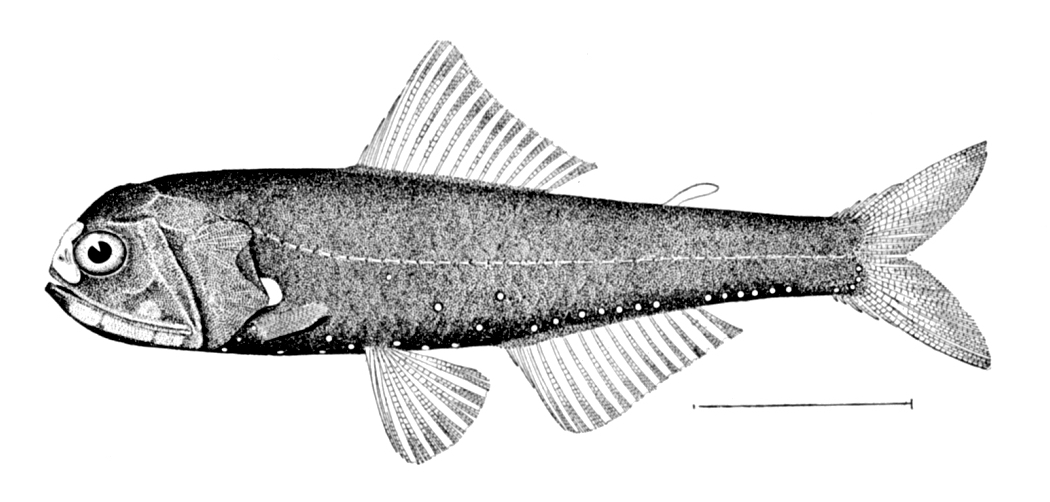
- From Oceanic Ichthyology by G. Brown Goode and Tarleton H. Bean, 1896

Conservation status
- Least Concern (IUCN 3.1)

Scientific classification
- Kingdom: Animalia
- Phylum: Chordata
- Class: Actinopterygii
- Order: Myctophiformes
- Family: Myctophidae
- Genus: Diaphus
- Species: D. lucidus

Binomial name
- Diaphus lucidus (Goode and Bean, 1896)

Synonyms
- List: Aethoprora lucida Goode & Bean, 1896; Diaphus lucida (Goode & Bean, 1896); Diaphus monodi Fowler, 1934; Diaphus reidi Fowler, 1934; Diaphus altifrons Kulikova, 1961

= Diaphus lucidus =

Species of fish

Diaphus lucidus, the spotlight lanternfish, is a species of lanternfish found worldwide.

== Description ==
This species reaches a length of 11.8 cm (4.6 in).
