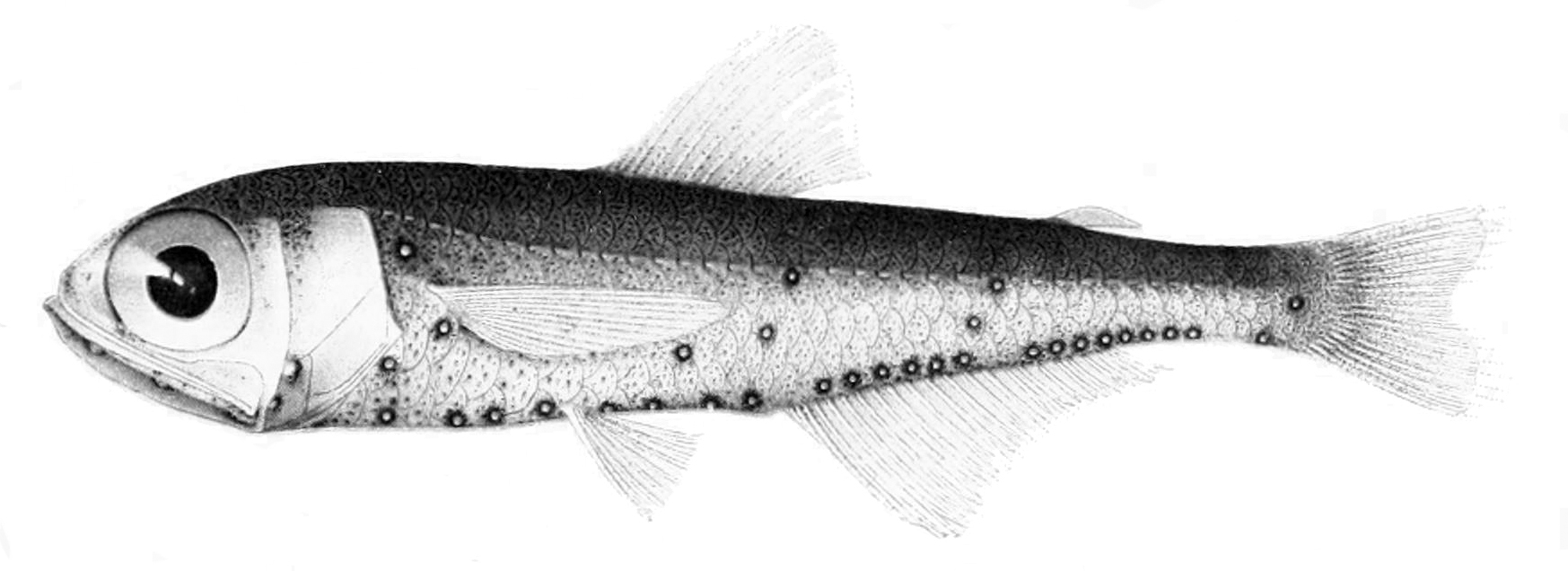

Conservation status
- Least Concern (IUCN 3.1)

Scientific classification
- Kingdom: Animalia
- Phylum: Chordata
- Class: Actinopterygii
- Order: Myctophiformes
- Family: Myctophidae
- Genus: Diaphus
- Species: D. luetkeni

Binomial name
- Diaphus luetkeni (A. B. Brauer, 1904)

Synonyms
- Myctophum luetkeni A. B. Brauer, 1904

= Diaphus luetkeni =

Species of fish

Diaphus luetkeni, also known as Luetken's lanternfish, is a species of lanternfish found worldwide.

== Description ==
This species reaches a length of 6.0 cm (2.4 in).

== Etymology ==
The fish is named in honor of Danish zoologist Christian Frederik Lütken (1827–1901), recognizing his 1892 classification of twenty four lanternfish species.
