= Diaphus parini =

Conservation status
- Data Deficient (IUCN 3.1)

Scientific classification
- Kingdom: Animalia
- Phylum: Chordata
- Class: Actinopterygii
- Order: Myctophiformes
- Family: Myctophidae
- Genus: Diaphus
- Species: D. parini

Binomial name
- Diaphus parini Becker, 1992

Species of fish

Diaphus parini is a species of lanternfish found in the south-eastern Pacific Ocean.

== Etymology ==
The fish is named in honor of ichthyologist Nikolai Vasilyevich Parin (1932–2012), of the Russian Academy of Sciences.
