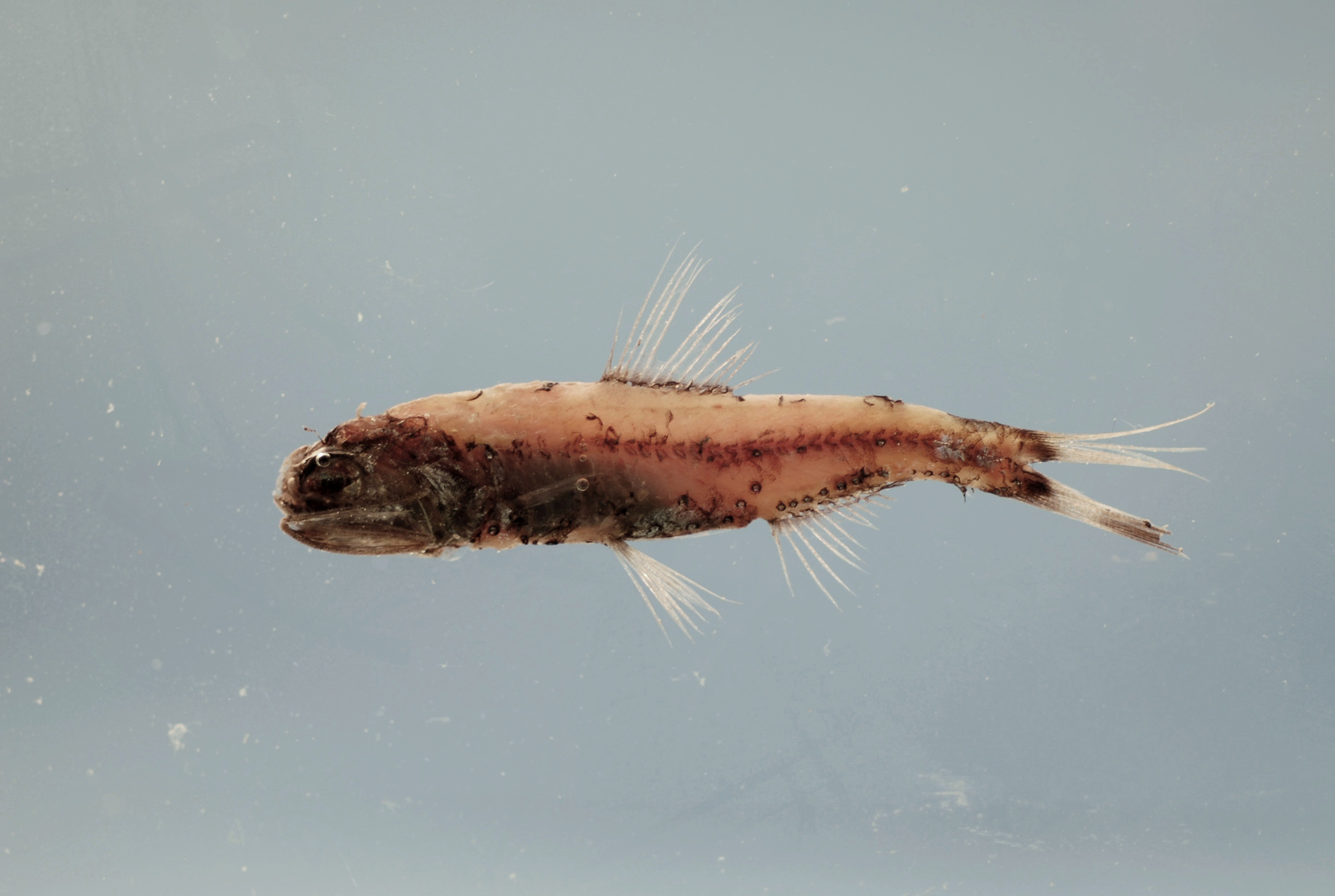

Conservation status
- Least Concern (IUCN 3.1)

Scientific classification
- Kingdom: Animalia
- Phylum: Chordata
- Class: Actinopterygii
- Order: Myctophiformes
- Family: Myctophidae
- Genus: Diaphus
- Species: D. adenomus

Binomial name
- Diaphus adenomus C. H. Gilbert, 1905

= Diaphus adenomus =

Species of fish

Diaphus adenomus, also known as Gilbert's large lantern fish, is a species of lanternfish found worldwide.

== Description ==
This species reaches a length of 18.0 cm (7.1 in).
