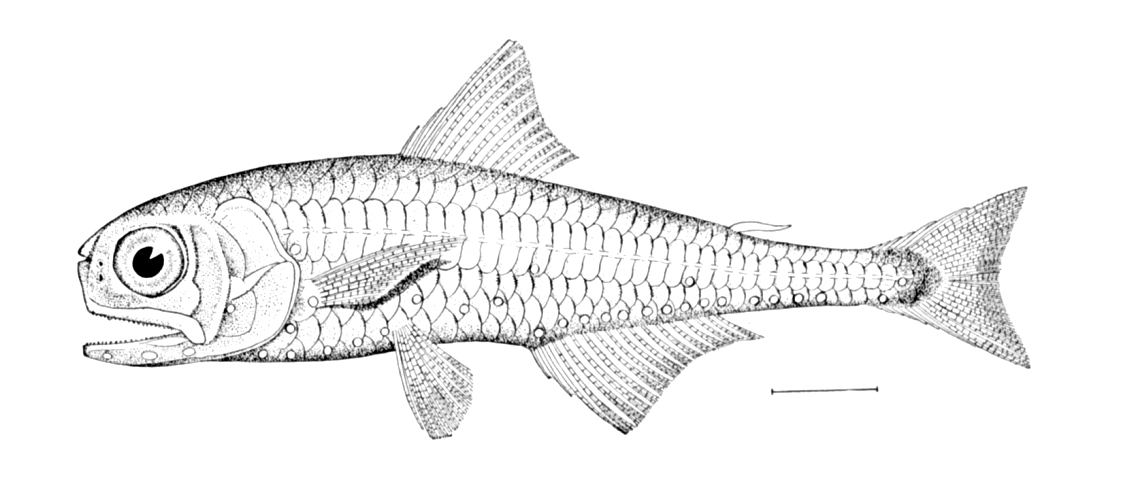
- Dasyscopelus asper

Scientific classification
- Kingdom: Animalia
- Phylum: Chordata
- Class: Actinopterygii
- Order: Myctophiformes
- Family: Myctophidae
- Genus: Dasyscopelus; Günther, 1864

Type species
- Myctophum asperum J. Richardson, 1845

= Dasyscopelus =

Genus of fishes

Dasyscopelus is a genus of lanternfish, family Myctophidae.

== Taxonomy ==
Dasyscopelus was originally described as a subgenus of Scopelus (now Myctophum) by Albert Günther in 1864. Later on, starting from Bolin (1959), it was treated as a synonym of Myctophum. Dasyscopelus was resurrected and treated as full genus based on molecular data by Martin and colleagues in 2018. There are no definite morphological characters distinguishing these genera.

== Species ==
There are currently seven recognized species in this genus:

- Dasyscopelus asper (Richardson, 1845) (prickly lanternfish)
- Dasyscopelus brachygnathos (Bleeker, 1856) (short-jawed lanternfish)
- Dasyscopelus lychnobius Bolin, 1946
- Dasyscopelus obtusirostris (Tåning, 1928) (bluntsnout lanternfish)
- Dasyscopelus orientalis (Gilbert, 1913) (Oriental lanternfish)
- Dasyscopelus selenops (Tåning, 1928) (Wisner's lantern fish)
- Dasyscopelus spinosus (Steindachner, 1867) (spiny lantern fish)
