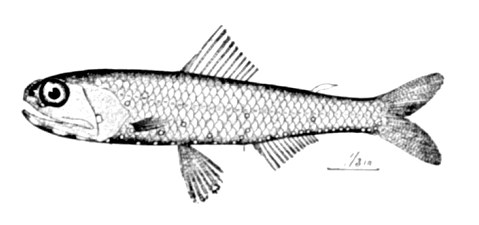

Conservation status
- Data Deficient (IUCN 3.1)

Scientific classification
- Kingdom: Animalia
- Phylum: Chordata
- Class: Actinopterygii
- Order: Myctophiformes
- Family: Myctophidae
- Genus: Diaphus
- Species: D. dumerilii

Binomial name
- Diaphus dumerilii (Bleeker, 1856)

Synonyms
- Scopelus dumerilii Bleeker, 1856; Diaphus dumerili (Bleeker, 1856); Myctophum dumerili (Bleeker, 1856)

= Diaphus dumerilii =

Species of fish

Diaphus dumerilii, also known as Dumeril's lanternfish, is a species of lanternfish found in the eastern Atlantic Ocean.

== Description ==
This species reaches a length of 9.5 cm (3.7 in).

== Etymology ==
The fish is named in honor of Auguste Duméril (1812–1870), a herpetologist and an ichthyologist, of the Muséum national d'Histoire naturelle in Paris.
