= Diaphus dahlgreni =

Conservation status
- Data Deficient (IUCN 3.1)

Scientific classification
- Kingdom: Animalia
- Phylum: Chordata
- Class: Actinopterygii
- Order: Myctophiformes
- Family: Myctophidae
- Genus: Diaphus
- Species: D. dahlgreni

Binomial name
- Diaphus dahlgreni Fowler, 1934

Species of fish

Diaphus dahlgreni is a species of lanternfish found in the Philippines and the western-central Pacific Ocean.

== Etymology ==
The fish is named in honor of zoologist Ulric Dahlgren (1870–1946), of Princeton University, because of his work on "luminous animals"
