= Diaphus mascarensis =

Conservation status
- Least Concern (IUCN 3.1)

Scientific classification
- Kingdom: Animalia
- Phylum: Chordata
- Class: Actinopterygii
- Order: Myctophiformes
- Family: Myctophidae
- Genus: Diaphus
- Species: D. mascarensis

Binomial name
- Diaphus mascarensis Becker, 1990

Synonyms
- Myctophum fulgens A. B. Brauer, 1904

Species of fish

Diaphus mascarensis is a species of lanternfish found in the western Indian Ocean.

== Description ==
This species reaches a length of 14.4 cm (5.7 in).
