= Diaphus hudsoni =

Conservation status
- Least Concern (IUCN 3.1)

Scientific classification
- Kingdom: Animalia
- Phylum: Chordata
- Class: Actinopterygii
- Order: Myctophiformes
- Family: Myctophidae
- Genus: Diaphus
- Species: D. hudsoni

Binomial name
- Diaphus hudsoni Zurbrigg & W. B. Scott, 1976

Species of fish

Diaphus hudsoni, or Hudson's lanternfish, is a species of lanternfish found worldwide.

== Description ==
This species reaches a length of 8.4 cm (3.3 in).

== Etymology ==
The fish is named for the Canadian Coast Guard Ship Hudson, in honor of the Hudson 70 Cruise around the Americas, during which the type specimen was collected.
