= Diaphus faustinoi =

Conservation status
- Data Deficient (IUCN 3.1)

Scientific classification
- Kingdom: Animalia
- Phylum: Chordata
- Class: Actinopterygii
- Order: Myctophiformes
- Family: Myctophidae
- Genus: Diaphus
- Species: D. faustinoi

Binomial name
- Diaphus faustinoi Fowler, 1934

Species of fish

Diaphus faustinoi is a species of lanternfish found in the Philippines and the western-central Pacific Ocean.

== Etymology ==
The fish is named in honor of Leopoldo A. Faustino (1892–1935), a geologist, a mineralogist and a conchologist with the Bureau of Science, in Manila, Philippines.
