= Diaphus chrysorhynchus =

Conservation status
- Least Concern (IUCN 3.1)

Scientific classification
- Kingdom: Animalia
- Phylum: Chordata
- Class: Actinopterygii
- Order: Myctophiformes
- Family: Myctophidae
- Genus: Diaphus
- Species: D. chrysorhynchus

Binomial name
- Diaphus chrysorhynchus C. H. Gilbert & Cramer, 1897

Species of fish

Diaphus chrysorhynchus, the golden-nose lantern fish, is a species of lanternfish found in the Pacific Ocean.

== Description ==
This species reaches a length of 1.1 cm (0.43 in).
