= Dasyscopelus lychnobius =

Conservation status
- Least Concern (IUCN 3.1)

Scientific classification
- Kingdom: Animalia
- Phylum: Chordata
- Class: Actinopterygii
- Order: Myctophiformes
- Family: Myctophidae
- Genus: Dasyscopelus
- Species: D. lychnobius

Binomial name
- Dasyscopelus lychnobius (Bolin, 1946)

Synonyms
- Myctophum lychnobium

Species of fish

Dasyscopelus lychnobius is a species of lanternfish.
