= Diaphus burtoni =

Conservation status
- Least Concern (IUCN 3.1)

Scientific classification
- Kingdom: Animalia
- Phylum: Chordata
- Class: Actinopterygii
- Order: Myctophiformes
- Family: Myctophidae
- Genus: Diaphus
- Species: D. burtoni

Binomial name
- Diaphus burtoni Fowler, 1934

Species of fish

Diaphus burtoni is a species of lanternfish found in the Philippines and the western-central Pacific Ocean.

== Etymology ==
The fish is named in honor of Edward Milby Burton (1898–1977), Director of the Charleston Museum, South Carolina, who collected specimens of local fishes for his museum and invited Fowler to study them.
