= Scopelengys =

Scientific classification
- Kingdom: Animalia
- Phylum: Chordata
- Class: Actinopterygii
- Order: Myctophiformes
- Family: Neoscopelidae
- Genus: Scopelengys; Alcock, 1890

Genus of fishes

Scopelengys is a genus of fishes in the family Neoscopelidae.

== Species ==
The recognized species in this genus are:

- Scopelengys clarkei J. L. Butler & Ahlstrom, 1976
- Scopelengys tristis Alcock, 1890 (Pacific blackchin)
