= Diaphus taaningi =

Conservation status
- Data Deficient (IUCN 3.1)

Scientific classification
- Kingdom: Animalia
- Phylum: Chordata
- Class: Actinopterygii
- Order: Myctophiformes
- Family: Myctophidae
- Genus: Diaphus
- Species: D. taaningi

Binomial name
- Diaphus taaningi Norman, 1930

Species of fish

Diaphus taaningi, the slopewater lanternfish, is a species of lanternfish found in the eastern Atlantic Ocean.

== Description ==
This species reaches a length of 7.0 cm (2.8 in).

== Etymology ==
The fish is named in honor of Danish lanternfish expert Åge Vedel Tåning (1890–1958), who loaned the type specimens to Norman and provided additional information about them.
