= Dasyscopelus spinosus =

Conservation status
- Least Concern (IUCN 3.1)

Scientific classification
- Kingdom: Animalia
- Phylum: Chordata
- Class: Actinopterygii
- Order: Myctophiformes
- Family: Myctophidae
- Genus: Dasyscopelus
- Species: D. spinosus

Binomial name
- Dasyscopelus spinosus (Steindachner, 1867)

Synonyms
- Scopelus spinosus Steindachner, 1867; Myctophum spinosus (Steindachner, 1867); Scopelus cuvieri Castelnau, 1873

Species of fish

Dasyscopelus spinosus, the spiny lanternfish, is a species of lanternfish. It occurs in the Atlantic, Indian, and Pacific Oceans. It can grow to 9 cm (3.5 in) standard length.
