= Diaphus rivatoni =

Conservation status
- Data Deficient (IUCN 3.1)

Scientific classification
- Kingdom: Animalia
- Phylum: Chordata
- Class: Actinopterygii
- Order: Myctophiformes
- Family: Myctophidae
- Genus: Diaphus
- Species: D. rivatoni

Binomial name
- Diaphus rivatoni Bourret, 1985

Species of fish

Diaphus rivatoni is a species of lanternfish found in the Pacific Ocean.

== Description ==
This species reaches a length of 11.0 cm (4.3 in).

== Etymology ==
The fish is named in honor of Bourret's friend and colleague of 20 years Jacques Rivaton (1921–2009), of the Office de la Recherche Scientifique et Technique d'Outre-Mer, New Caledonia, who has devoted much effort to the identification of Diaphus from the Western Pacific.
