= Diaphus lucifrons =

Conservation status
- Data Deficient (IUCN 3.1)

Scientific classification
- Kingdom: Animalia
- Phylum: Chordata
- Class: Actinopterygii
- Order: Myctophiformes
- Family: Myctophidae
- Genus: Diaphus
- Species: D. lucifrons

Binomial name
- Diaphus lucifrons Fowler, 1934

Species of fish

Diaphus lucifrons is a species of lanternfish found in the Philippines and the western-central Pacific Ocean.
