= Taaningichthys =

Scientific classification
- Kingdom: Animalia
- Phylum: Chordata
- Class: Actinopterygii
- Order: Myctophiformes
- Family: Myctophidae
- Genus: Taaningichthys; Bolin, 1959

Genus of fishes

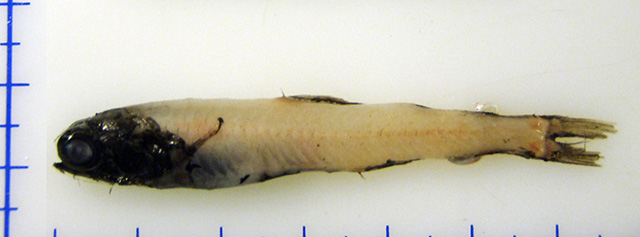
Taaningichthys bathyphilus

Taaningichthys is a genus of lanternfishes.

== Etymology ==
The genus is named in honour of Åge Vedel Tåning, a Danish lanternfish expert.

== Species ==
There are currently three recognized species in this genus:

- Taaningichthys bathyphilus (Tåning, 1928) (Deepwater lanternfish)
- Taaningichthys minimus (Tåning, 1928)
- Taaningichthys paurolychnus Davy, 1972
