= Diaphus trachops =

Conservation status
- Least Concern (IUCN 3.1)

Scientific classification
- Kingdom: Animalia
- Phylum: Chordata
- Class: Actinopterygii
- Order: Myctophiformes
- Family: Myctophidae
- Genus: Diaphus
- Species: D. trachops

Binomial name
- Diaphus trachops Wisner, 1974

Species of fish

Diaphus trachops is a species of lanternfish found in the eastern-central Pacific Ocean.

== Description ==
This species reaches a length of 6.4 cm (2.5 in).
