= Dasyscopelus orientalis =

Conservation status
- Least Concern (IUCN 3.1)

Scientific classification
- Kingdom: Animalia
- Phylum: Chordata
- Class: Actinopterygii
- Order: Myctophiformes
- Family: Myctophidae
- Genus: Dasyscopelus
- Species: D. orientalis

Binomial name
- Dasyscopelus orientalis C. H. Gilbert, 1913

Synonyms
- Myctophum orientale

Species of fish

Dasyscopelus orientalis, the Oriental lanternfish, is a species of lanternfish. The Oriental Lanternfish is native to deep waters.
