= Charles Tate Regan =

British zoologist (1878–1943)

Charles Regan FRS
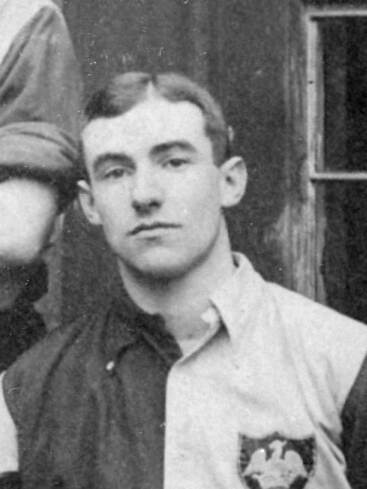
- Born: 1 February 1878; Sherborne
- Died: 12 January 1943 (aged 64)
- Occupation: ichthyologist
- Known for: fish classification schemes

Charles Tate Regan (1 February 1878 – 12 January 1943) was a British ichthyologist, working mainly around the beginning of the 20th century. He did extensive work on fish classification schemes.

Born in Sherborne, Dorset, he was educated at Derby School and Queens' College, Cambridge and in 1901 joined the staff of the Natural History Museum, where he became Keeper of Zoology, and later director of the entire museum, in which role he served from 1927 to 1938.

Regan was elected Fellow of the Royal Society in 1917.

Regan mentored a number of scientists, among them Ethelwynn Trewavas, who continued his work at the British Natural History Museum.

== Taxon described by him ==
- See Category:Taxa named by Charles Tate Regan

Among the species he described is the Siamese fighting fish (Betta splendens). In turn, a number of fish species have been named regani in his honour:

== Taxon named in his honor ==
- A Thorny Catfish Anadoras regani (Steindachner, 1908)
- The Dwarf Cichlid Apistogramma regani
- Apogon regani
- A Catfish Astroblepus regani
- A Dragonet Callionymus regani
- The Pink Flabby Whalefish Cetostoma regani Zugmayer, 1914
- Crenicichla regani
- Diaphus regani Tåning, 1932, the Regan's lanternfish, is a species of lanternfish

found in the Atlantic and Indian Oceans.

- Engyprosopon regani
- Gambusia regani

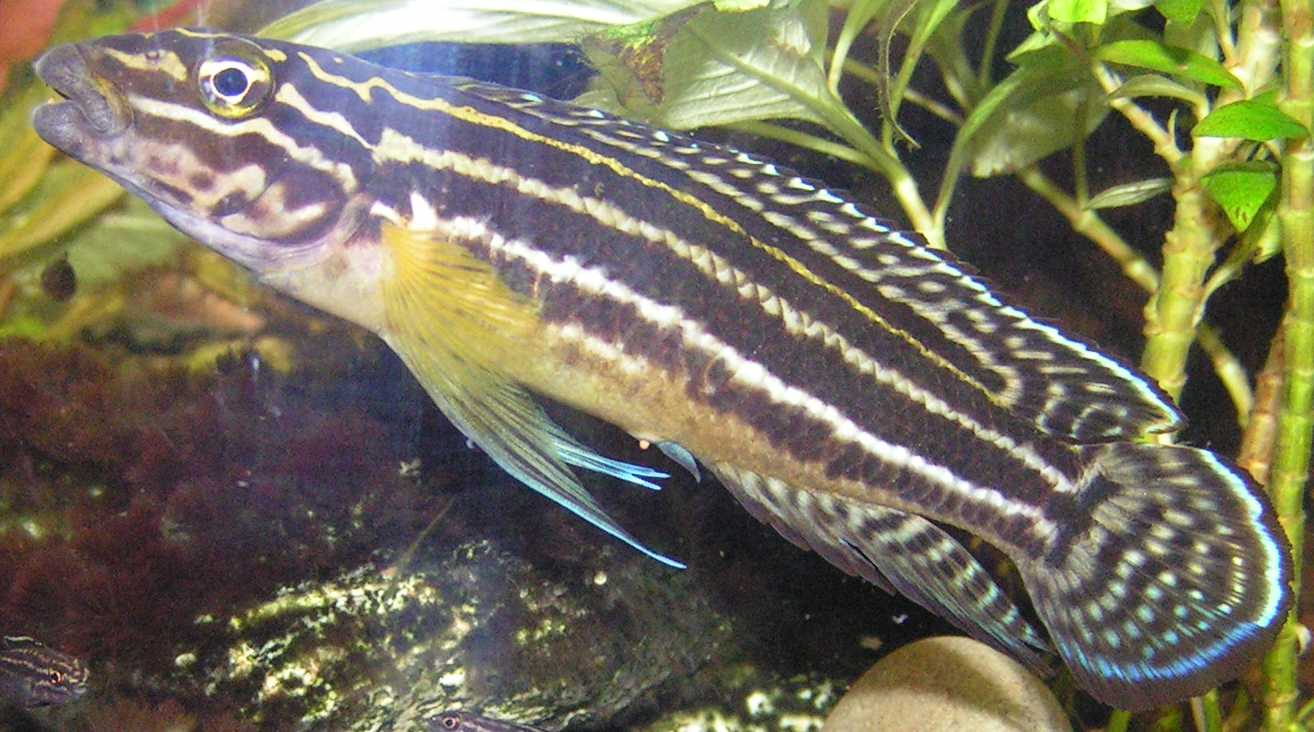
Convict julie – a fish whose scientific name is Julidochromis regani (named after Charles Regan)

- Hemipsilichthys regani
- The Izak Catshark Holohalaelurus regani
- Hoplichthys regani
- Hypostomus regani (Ihering, 1905)
- Julidochromis regani
- Lycozoarces regani
- The Icefish Neosalanx regani
- The Orkney Charr Salvelinus inframundus
- Symphurus regani
- Trichomycterus regani
- Tylochromis regani
- Vieja regani
- Zebrias regani
