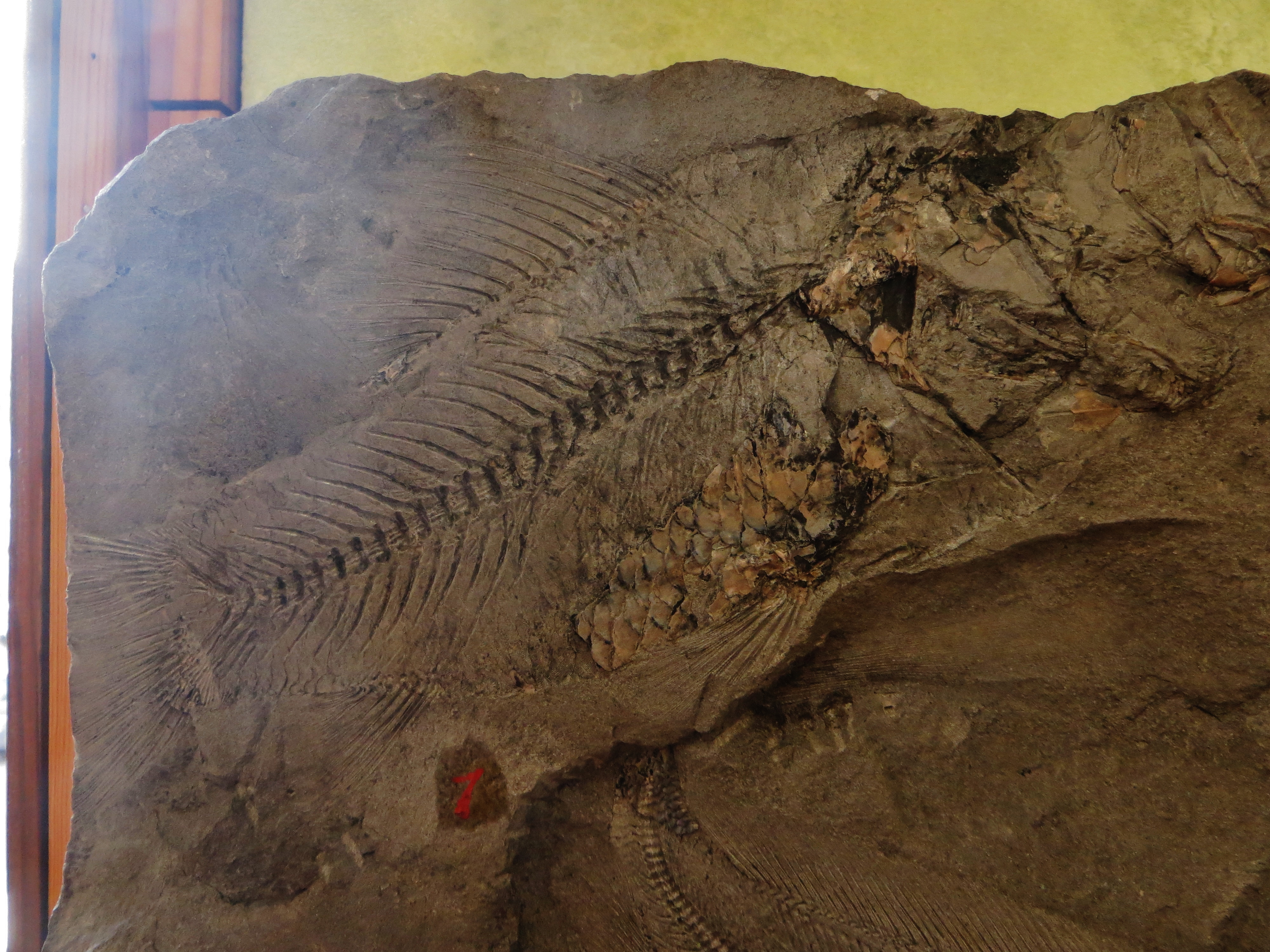

Scientific classification
- Domain: Eukaryota
- Kingdom: Animalia
- Phylum: Chordata
- Class: Actinopterygii
- Order: Myctophiformes
- Family: †Sardinioididae
- Genus: †Sardinioides; Marck, 1858

Species
- †S. monasterii (Agassiz, 1835); †S. crassicaudus (Marck, 1863); †S. macrophthalmus (von der Marck and Schlüter, 1863)

= Sardinioides =

Sardinioides Temporal range: Late Cretaceous (Campanian) 83.6–72.1 Ma

Extinct genus of fishes

Sardinioides is an extinct genus of prehistoric ray-finned fish from the Campanian. It is a member of the order Myctophiformes, and considered a sister group to Paleogene and modern neoscopelids and myctophids.
