= Neocassandra =

Neocassandra Temporal range: Paleocene

Scientific classification
- Domain: Eukaryota
- Kingdom: Animalia
- Phylum: Chordata
- Class: Actinopterygii
- Order: Myctophiformes
- Genus: †Neocassandra; Daniltshenko, 1968

Extinct genus of fishes

Neocassandra is an extinct genus of prehistoric ray-finned fish that lived during the Paleocene epoch.

== See also ==
- Prehistoric fish
- List of prehistoric bony fish
