= Gilbert Percy Whitley =

British born Australian ichythyologist and zoologist

Gilbert Percy Whitley (9 June 1903 – 18 July 1975) was an Australian ichthyologist and malacologist who was curator of fishes at the Australian Museum in Sydney for about 40 years.

== Early life and education ==
Gilbert Percy Whitley was born on 9 June 1903 at Swaythling, Southampton, England, the eldest child of Percy Nathan Whitley and Clara Minnie (née Moass).

He was educated first at King Edward VI School, Southampton and then Osborne House School in Romsey, Hampshire.

Whitley migrated with his family to Sydney in 1921. He started working at the Australian Museum in 1922, while studying zoology at Sydney Technical College and the University of Sydney.

== Career ==
In 1925 Whitley was formally appointed to the title of ichthyologist (later renamed curator of fishes) at the Museum, a position he held until retirement in 1964. During his term of office he doubled the size of the ichthyological collection to 37,000 specimens through many collecting expeditions.

After his retirement, another eminent ichthyologist, Frank Talbot, was appointed to his position, later becoming director of the museum for around 10 years.

== Other activities ==
Whitley served as president of the Royal Zoological Society of New South Wales during 1940–41, 1959–60, and 1973–74, and edited its publications from 1947 to 1971.

He served on the councils of the Royal Australian Historical Society and the Anthropological Society of New South Wales. He was a member of the Great Barrier Reef Committee, and served as president of the Linnean Society of New South Wales from 1963 to 1964.

He also had involvement with the Australian and New Zealand Association for the Advancement of Science.

== Recognition ==
- 1934: Elected fellow, Royal Zoological Society of New South Wales
- 1967: Natural History Medallion, by the Field Naturalists Club of Victoria
- 1970: Clarke Medal, by the Royal Society of New South Wales

== Death and legacy ==
Whitley died in Sydney on 18 July 1975.

The Whitley Awards for zoological literature were named in his honour, established in 1979 by the Royal Zoological Society of New South Wales and continuing to this day (as of 2024).

His zoological author abbreviation was "Whitley".

=== Taxa named in his honour ===
- Diaphus whitleyi, Fowler, 1934 is a species of lanternfish found in the Philippines and the Western Central Pacific Ocean.
- The Bigcheek snailfish, Psednos whitleyi Stein, Chernova & Andriashev, 2001 is a species of snailfish found in the Eastern Indian Ocean.
- Whitley's boxfish Ostracion whitleyi Fowler, 1931 is a species of boxfish found in the Eastern Central Pacific Ocean.

=== Taxa described by him ===
- See Category:Taxa named by Gilbert Percy Whitley

Awards
Preceded by Samuel Warren Carey	Clarke Medal; 1970	Succeeded by Nancy Tyson Burbidge
