= Volcichthys =

Volcichthys Temporal range: Cenomanian

Scientific classification
- Domain: Eukaryota
- Kingdom: Animalia
- Phylum: Chordata
- Class: Actinopterygii
- Genus: †Volcichthys; D'Erasmo, 1946

Volcichthys is an extinct genus of prehistoric bony fish that lived during the Cenomanian age of the Late Cretaceous Period.

== See also ==
- Prehistoric fish
- List of prehistoric bony fish
