= Åge Vedel Tåning =

Danish ichthyologist

Åge Vedel Tåning (27 July 1890 – 26 September 1958 in Copenhagen) was a Danish ichthyologist. He was a director of the Carlsberg Laboratory, the Dana collection and the Danish Fisheries Research Station.

== Taxon named in his honor ==
- Lanternfish genus Taaningichthys was named in his honour by Rolf Ling Bolin in 1959.
- The Slopewater lanternfish, Diaphus taaningi Norman, 1930, is a species of lanternfish found in the Eastern Atlantic Ocean.

== Taxon described by him ==
- See Category:Taxa named by Åge Vedel Tåning
