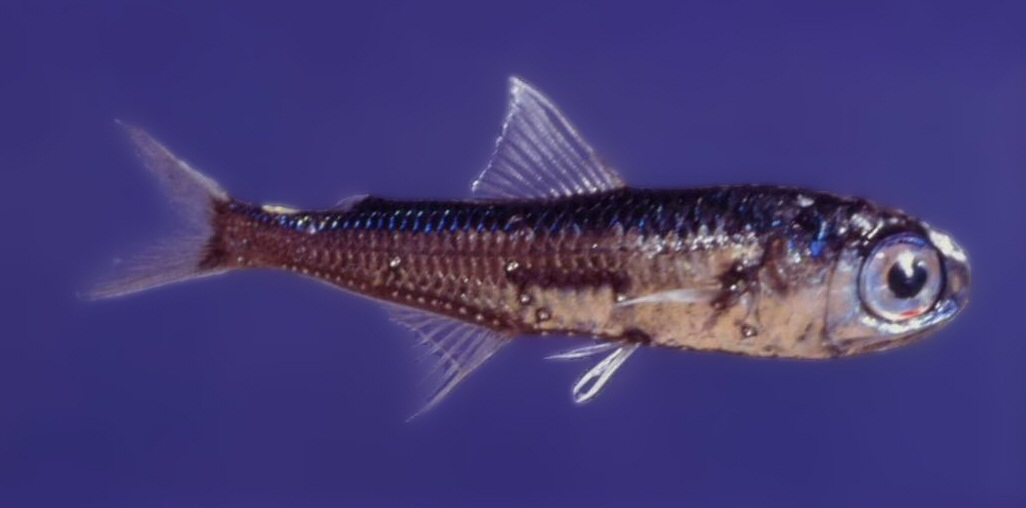
- Spotted lanternfish (Myctophum punctatum)

Scientific classification
- Kingdom: Animalia
- Phylum: Chordata
- Class: Actinopterygii
- Clade: Ctenosquamata
- Superorder: Scopelomorpha
- Order: Myctophiformes; Regan, 1911

Type species
- Myctophum punctatum Rafinesque, 1810

Families
- Myctophidae; Neoscopelidae †Sardinioididae

= Myctophiformes =

Myctophiformes Temporal range: Late Cenomanian to present

Order of fishes

The Myctophiformes /ˈmɪktəfɪfɔːrmiːz/ are an order of ray-finned fishes consisting of two families of deep-sea marine fish, most notably the highly abundant lanternfishes (Myctophidae). The blackchins (Neoscopelidae) contain six species in three genera, while the bulk of the family belongs to the Myctophidae, with over 30 genera and some 252 species.

The scientific name ultimately derives from Ancient Greek myktér (μυκτήρ, "nose") + óphis (ὄφῖς, "serpent") + Latin forma ("external form"), the Greek part in reference to the long, slender, and heavy-headed shape of these fishes.

== Description and ecology ==
These smallish fishes inhabit the pelagic and benthopelagic zones of the deep sea. They are laterally compressed and usually have photophores (light organs). The eyes are large, in some decidedly huge, and generally directed straight sideways. The mouth also quite large and located at the tip of the snout; its gape extends to below the eyes or even beyond. They have an adipose fin. The pelvic fin has eight rays in most myctophiforms, and the number of branchiostegal rays is usually higher than six and lower than 12.

== Systematics ==
The two families of the Myctophiformes are:

- Myctophidae – lanternfishes
- Neoscopelidae – blackchins

The extinct family Sardinioididae (containing Sardinioides and possibly Volcichthys) is known from the Late Cretaceous (Cenomanian to Campanian). The genus Neocassandra from the Late Paleocene is either considered its own family or a member of the Neoscopelidae. Some members were previously confused with aulopiforms.

The order Myctophiformes is anatomically similar to the grinners (Aulopiformes), but their pharyngobranchials and retractor muscles are more plesiomorphic. It was also allied with the more advanced spiny-rayed Teleostei (e.g. Paracanthopterygii) as "Ctenosquamata". These apomorphically have a fifth upper pharyngeal toothplate and a third internal levator muscle to move it, and molecular data also support the long-held view that these two lineages are at least closely related. Other sources ally them with the Lampriformes, which are often placed in a monotypic superorder "Lampridiomorpha". In a similar fashion, separation of the Myctophiformes in superorder "Scopelomorpha" has been proposed. The Aulopiformes, though, are usually considered to be closer or even among the Protacanthopterygii, one of the core groups of moderately advanced teleosts. As modern taxonomy tries to avoid a profusion of small taxa, and the delimitation of the Euteleostei (Protacanthopterygii sensu stricto and their allies) versus "Ctenosquamata" such as the Paracanthopterygii remains uncertain, the systematics and taxonomy of the Myctophiformes among the teleosts are in need of further study.
