= 2019 in paleoichthyology =

This list of fossil fishes described in 2019 is a list of new taxa of jawless vertebrates, placoderms, acanthodians, fossil cartilaginous fishes, bony fishes, and other fishes of every kind that were described during the year 2019, as well as other significant discoveries and events related to paleoichthyology that occurred in 2019.

== New taxa ==
=== Jawless vertebrates ===
Name	Novelty	Status	Authors	Age	Type locality	Country	Notes	Images
Archegonaspis bashkirica	Sp. nov	Valid	Märss	Silurian (Ludlow)		Russia (Bashkortostan)	A member of the family Cyathaspididae.	
Cyathaspis alexanderi	Sp. nov	Valid	Märss	Silurian	Tabuska Beds	Russia (Chelyabinsk Oblast)	A member of the family Cyathaspididae.	
Jiaoyu	Gen. et sp. nov	Valid	Liu et al.	Silurian	Kezirtag formation	China	A member of Galeaspida of uncertain phylogenetic placement. The type species is J. imperfectus.	
Parathelodus liaokuoensis	Sp. nov	Valid	Cui et al.	Devonian (Lochkovian)	Xishancun Formation; Xitun Formation	China	A thelodont belonging to the family Coelolepidae. Announced in 2019; the final version of the article naming it was published in 2020.	
Parathelodus wangi	Sp. nov	Valid	Cui et al.	Devonian (Lochkovian)	Xishancun Formation; Xitun Formation	China	A thelodont belonging to the family Coelolepidae. Announced in 2019; the final version of the article naming it was published in 2020.	
Parathelodus xitunensis	Sp. nov	Valid	Cui et al.	Devonian (Lochkovian)	Xitun Formation	China	A thelodont belonging to the family Coelolepidae. Announced in 2019; the final version of the article naming it was published in 2020.	
Tethymyxine	Gen. et sp. nov	Valid	Miyashita et al.	Late Cretaceous (Cenomanian)	Hjoula Lagerstätte	Lebanon	A hagfish. The type species is T. tapirostrum.	
Tolypelepis bedovensis	Sp. nov	Valid	Märss	Late Silurian	Krasnaya Bukhta Formation	Russia (Krasnoyarsk Krai)	A member of the family Cyathaspididae.	
Xiyuaspis	Gen. et comb. nov	Junior homonym	Liu et al.	Silurian	Tataertag Formation	China	A member of Galeaspida belonging to the group Hanyangaspidida and to the family Xiushuiaspidae. The type species is "Nanjiangaspis" zhangi Lu et al. (2007). The generic name is preoccupied by Xiyuaspis Zhang (1985); Shan et al. (2023) coined a replacement name Xiyuichthys.	

=== Placoderms ===
Name	Novelty	Status	Authors	Age	Type locality	Country	Notes	Images
Asterolepis alticristata	Sp. nov	Valid	Downs et al.	Devonian (Frasnian)	Fram Formation	Canada (Nunavut)	An antiarch in Asterolepis	
Colombialepis	Gen. et sp. nov	Valid	Olive et al.	Late Devonian	Cuche Formation	Colombia	A member of Antiarchi, superfamily Asterolepidoidei. Genus includes new species C. villarroeli.	
Colombiaspis	Gen. et sp. nov	Valid	Olive et al.	Late Devonian	Cuche Formation	Colombia	A member of Arthrodira, family Groenlandaspidae. Genus includes new species C. rinconensis.	
Meeksiella	Gen. et sp. nov	Valid	Trinajstic et al.	Devonian (Frasnian)	Snetnya Gora Beds	Estonia; Latvia; Russia (Pskov Oblast)	A member of Ptyctodontida. The type species is "Chelyophorus" pskovensis Obruchev (1947).	

=== Acanthodians ===
Name	Novelty	Status	Authors	Age	Type locality	Country	Notes	Images
Cheiracanthus peachi	Sp. nov	Valid	Den Blaauwen, Newman & Burrow	Devonian (Givetian)	Mey Flagstone Formation; Rousay Flagstone Formation	United Kingdom		
Serradentus	Gen. et sp. nov		Newman, Burrow & Den Blaauwen	Devonian (Givetian)	Tordalen Formation	Germany; Norway	A member of Ischnacanthiformes. The type species is S. armstrongi.	

=== Cartilaginous fishes ===
Name	Novelty	Status	Authors	Age	Type locality	Country	Notes	Images
Antiquaobatis	Gen. et sp. nov	Valid	Stumpf & Kriwet	Early Jurassic (Pliensbachian)		Germany	A member of Rajiformes of uncertain phylogenetic placement. The type species is A. grimmenensis.	
Asflapristis	Gen. et sp. nov	Valid	Villalobos-Segura et al.	Late Cretaceous (Turonian)	Akrabou Formation	Morocco	A member of Sclerorhynchoidei belonging to the family Ptychotrygonidae. Genus includes new species A. cristadentis.	
Cantioscyllium clementsi	Sp. nov	Valid	Case et al.	Late Cretaceous (Campanian)	Bladen Formation	United States (North Carolina)	A member of the family Ginglymostomatidae.	
Carcharhinus mancinae	Sp. nov	Valid	Ebersole, Cicimurri & Stringer	Eocene (Bartonian)	Gosport Sand; Lisbon Formation	United States (Alabama)	A species of Carcharhinus.	
Carcharhinus underwoodi	Sp. nov	Valid	Samonds et al.	Eocene	Mahajanga Basin	Madagascar	A species of Carcharhinus.	
Carcharias dominguei	Sp. nov	Valid	Cappetta, Morrison & Adnet	Late Cretaceous (Campanian)	Northumberland Formation	Canada (British Columbia)	A species of Carcharias.	
Centrosqualus mustardi	Sp. nov	Valid	Cappetta, Morrison & Adnet	Late Cretaceous (Campanian)	Northumberland Formation	Canada (British Columbia)	A member of the family Squalidae.	
Chlamydoselachus balli	Sp. nov	Valid	Cappetta, Morrison & Adnet	Late Cretaceous (Campanian)	Northumberland Formation	Canada (British Columbia)	A species of Chlamydoselachus.	
Cretalamna feldmanni	Sp. nov	Valid	Hoganson, Erickson & Holland	Late Cretaceous (Maastrichtian)	Fox Hills Formation	United States (North Dakota)		
Cretodus houghtonorum	Sp. nov	Valid	Shimada & Everhart	Late Cretaceous (Turonian)	Carlile Shale	United States (Kansas)	A mackerel shark belonging to the family Pseudoscapanorhynchidae.	
Dasyatis northdakotaensis	Sp. nov	Valid	Hoganson, Erickson & Holland	Late Cretaceous (Maastrichtian)	Fox Hills Formation	United States (North Dakota)	A species of Dasyatis.	
Diprosopovenator	Gen. et sp. nov	Valid	Stumpf, Scheer & Kriwet	Late Cretaceous (Cenomanian)	Hesseltal Formation	Germany	A member of Carcharhiniformes belonging to the new family Pseudoscyliorhinidae. The type species is D. hilperti.	
Dykeius	Gen. et sp. nov	Valid	Cappetta, Morrison & Adnet	Late Cretaceous (Campanian)	Northumberland Formation	Canada (British Columbia)	A member of the family Chlamydoselachidae. The type species is D. garethi.	
Florenceodon	Gen. et sp. nov	Valid	Cappetta, Morrison & Adnet	Late Cretaceous (Campanian)	Northumberland Formation	Canada (British Columbia)	A member of Carcharhiniformes belonging to the new family Florenceodontidae. Genus includes new species F. johnyi.	
Galagadon	Gen. et sp. nov	Valid	Gates, Gorscak & Makovicky	Late Cretaceous (Maastrichtian)	Hell Creek Formation	United States (South Dakota)	A carpet shark. The type species is G. nordquistae.	
Glencartius	Gen. et comb. nov	Valid	Ginter & Skompski	Carboniferous (Viséan)		Poland; United Kingdom	A member of Ctenacanthiformes of uncertain phylogenetic placement. The type species is "Ctenacanthus" costellatus Traquair (1884).	
Gydoselache	Gen. et sp. nov	Valid	Maisey et al.	Devonian (Emsian)	Gydo Formation	South Africa	A cartilaginous fish of uncertain phylogenetic placement, related to Pucapampella and assigned to the new family Pucapampellidae. The type species is G. oosthuizeni.	
Hessinodon	Gen. et sp. nov	Valid	Cappetta, Morrison & Adnet	Late Cretaceous (Campanian)	Northumberland Formation	Canada (British Columbia)	A member of the family Dalatiidae. Genus includes new species H. wardi.	
Hypolophites beckeri	Sp. nov	Valid	Maisch	Paleocene	Midway Group	United States (Arkansas)	A member of Myliobatiformes.	
Isogomphodon aikenensis	Sp. nov	Valid	Cicimurri & Knight	Eocene (Priabonian)	Dry Branch Formation	United States (South Carolina)	A relative of the daggernose shark.	
Kimmerobatis	Gen. et sp. nov	Valid	Underwood & Claeson	Late Jurassic (Kimmeridgian)	Kimmeridge Clay	United Kingdom	A member of Batoidea related to Spathobatis. Genus includes new species K. etchesi.	
Komoksodon	Gen. et sp. nov	Valid	Cappetta, Morrison & Adnet	Late Cretaceous (Campanian)	Northumberland Formation	Canada (British Columbia)	A member of Hexanchiformes belonging to the new family Komoksodontidae. Genus includes new species K. kwutchakuth.	
Lessiniabatis	Gen. et sp. nov	Valid	Marramà et al.	Eocene (Ypresian)	Monte Bolca Konservat-Lagerstätte	Italy	A member of Myliobatiformes belonging to the superfamily Dasyatoidea. The type species is L. aenigmatica.	
Myledaphus araucanus	Sp. nov	Valid	Otero	Late Cretaceous (Maastrichtian)	Arauco Basin	Chile		
"Myliobatis" foxhillsensis	Sp. nov	Valid	Hoganson, Erickson & Holland	Late Cretaceous (Maastrichtian)	Fox Hills Formation	United States (North Dakota)	An eagle ray.	
Odontorhytis bahariensis	Sp. nov	Valid	Salame & Asan	Eocene (probably Lutetian)		Egypt	A member of Neoselachii of uncertain phylogenetic placement.	
Ottangodus	Gen. et sp. nov	Valid	Popov, Delsate & Felten	Middle Jurassic (Bajocian)		Luxembourg-French border	A chimaera belonging to the family Callorhinchidae. Genus includes new species O. lotharingiae.	
Paraorthacodus rossi	Sp. nov	Valid	Cappetta, Morrison & Adnet	Late Cretaceous (Campanian)	Northumberland Formation	Canada (British Columbia)		
Pastinachus kebarensis	Sp. nov	Valid	Adnet et al.	Eocene (late Bartonian)		Tunisia	A cowtail stingray of Pastinachus. Announced in 2018; the final version of the article naming it was published in 2019.	
Phoebodus saidselachus	Sp. nov	Valid	Frey et al.	Devonian (Famennian)		Morocco	A species of Phoebodus.	
Pristiophorus humboldti	Sp. nov	Valid	Villafaña et al.	Early Miocene		Chile	A species of Pristiophorus.	
Pristiophorus pricei	Sp. nov	Valid	Cappetta, Morrison & Adnet	Late Cretaceous (Campanian)	Northumberland Formation	Canada (British Columbia)	A species of Pristiophorus.	
Pristiophorus smithi	Sp. nov	Valid	Cappetta, Morrison & Adnet	Late Cretaceous (Campanian)	Northumberland Formation	Canada (British Columbia)	A species of Pristiophorus.	
Protocentrophorus steviae	Sp. nov	Valid	Cappetta, Morrison & Adnet	Late Cretaceous (Campanian)	Northumberland Formation	Canada (British Columbia)	A member of the family Centrophoridae.	
Protoheptranchias	Gen. et sp. nov	Valid	Cappetta, Morrison & Adnet	Late Cretaceous (Campanian)	Northumberland Formation	Canada (British Columbia)	A cow shark. Genus includes new species P. lowei.	
Protolamna ricaurtensis	Sp. nov	Valid	Carrillo-Briceño, Parra & Luque	Early Cretaceous (late Barremian–early Aptian)	Paja Formation	Colombia	A mackerel shark belonging to the family Pseudoscapanorhynchidae.	
Pseudabdounia	Gen. et comb. nov	Valid	Ebersole, Cicimurri & Stringer	Eocene	Gosport Sand; Lisbon Formation; Tallahatta Formation	Belgium; United States (Alabama)	A requiem shark. The type species is "Galeocerdo" recticonus Winkler (1874); genus also includes "Galeorhinus recticonus" claibornensis White (1956) (raised to the rank of a separate species Pseudabdounia claibornensis).	
Ptychotrygon rostrispatula	Sp. nov	Valid	Villalobos-Segura, Underwood & Ward	Late Cretaceous (Turonian)		Morocco		
Rhinoscymnus clarki	Sp. nov	Valid	Cappetta, Morrison & Adnet	Late Cretaceous (Campanian)	Northumberland Formation	Canada (British Columbia)	A member of the family Somniosidae.	
Rolfodon	Gen. et sp. et comb. nov	Valid	Cappetta, Morrison & Adnet	Late Cretaceous to Miocene	Angostura Formation; Northumberland Formation; Santa Marta Formation	Angola; Antarctica; Austria; Canada (British Columbia); Ecuador; New Zealand	A member of the family Chlamydoselachidae. The type species is R. ludvigseni; genus also includes "Chlamydoselachus" bracheri Pfeil (1983), "Chlamydoselachus" fiedleri Pfeil (1983), "Chlamydoselachus" thomsoni Richter & Ward (1990), "Chlamydoselachus" goliath Antunes & Cappetta (2002), "Chlamydoselachus" keyesi Mannering & Hiller (2008), "Chlamydoselachus" tatere Consoli (2008) and "Chlamydoselachus" landinii Carrillo-Briceño, Aguilera & Rodriguez (2014).	
Scymnodalatias kazenobon	Sp. nov	Valid	Nishimatsu & Ujihara	Middle Miocene	Yatsuo Group	Japan	A species of Scymnodalatias.	
Squaliodalatias savoiei	Sp. nov	Valid	Cappetta, Morrison & Adnet	Late Cretaceous (Campanian)	Northumberland Formation	Canada (British Columbia)	A member of the family Dalatiidae.	
Squalus nicholsae	Sp. nov	Valid	Cappetta, Morrison & Adnet	Late Cretaceous (Campanian)	Northumberland Formation	Canada (British Columbia)	A spurdog.	
Synechodus dereki	Sp. nov	Valid	Cappetta, Morrison & Adnet	Late Cretaceous (Campanian)	Northumberland Formation	Canada (British Columbia)	A member of the family Palaeospinacidae.	
Tethytrygon	Gen. et comb. nov	Valid	Marramà et al.	Eocene (Ypresian)	Monte Bolca	Italy	A whiptail stingray belonging to the subfamily Neotrygoninae; a new genus for "Raja" muricata Volta (1796).	
Tlalocbatos	Gen. et sp. nov	Valid	Brito, Villalobos-Segura & Alvarado-Ortega	Early Cretaceous	Tlayúa Formation	Mexico	A member of Batoidea related to the banjo rays. Genus includes new species T. applegatei.	
Xampylodon	Gen. et comb. nov	Valid	Cappetta, Morrison & Adnet	Late Cretaceous (Campanian)	Northumberland Formation	Canada (British Columbia)	A cow shark. Genus includes "Notidanus" dentatus Woodward (1886).	

=== Ray-finned fishes ===
Name	Novelty	Status	Authors	Age	Type locality	Country	Notes	Images
Acronuroides	Gen. et sp. nov.	Valid	Bannikov, Carnevale & Tyler	Eocene (late Ypresian)	Monte Bolca locality	Italy	A member of Percomorphacea of uncertain phylogenetic placement. The type species is A. eocaenicus.	
Acropoma aurora	Sp. nov	Valid	Schwarzhans	Mangaorapan to Bortonian		New Zealand	A species of Acropoma.	
Ambassis simesi	Sp. nov	Valid	Schwarzhans	Bortonian		New Zealand	A species of Ambassis.	
Ampheristus pentlandensis	Sp. nov	Valid	Schwarzhans	Bortonian		New Zealand	A member of the family Ophidiidae.	
Antigonia artata	Sp. nov	Valid	Schwarzhans	Waipawan-Heretaungan		New Zealand	A species of Antigonia.	
Antimyctophum	Gen. et comb. nov	Valid	Schwarzhans	Clifdenian to Tongaporutuan		New Zealand	A lanternfish. The type species is "Scopelus" konganaruensis Frost (1933).	
Archoplites langrellorum	Sp. nov	Valid	Van Tassell & Smith	Pliocene (Blancan)		United States (Oregon)	A relative of the Sacramento perch.	
Ardoreosomus	Gen. et sp. nov	Valid	Romano et al.	Early Triassic (Induan)	Candelaria Formation	United States (Nevada)	A member of the family Ptycholepidae. Genus includes new species A. occidentalis.	
Argyripnus oamaruensis	Sp. nov	Valid	Schwarzhans	Otaian and Altonian		New Zealand	A species of Argyripnus.	
Argyripnus rapahoensis	Sp. nov	Valid	Schwarzhans	Runangan		New Zealand	A species of Argyripnus.	
Arnoglossus lautus	Sp. nov	Valid	Schwarzhans	Duntroonian and Waitakian		New Zealand	A scaldfish.	
Arnoglossus purus	Sp. nov	Valid	Schwarzhans	Lillburnian and Waiauan		New Zealand	A scaldfish.	
Artediellichthys candelabrum	Sp. nov	Valid	Nazarkin	Miocene	Agnevo Formation	Russia (Sakhalin Oblast)	A relative of the blackfin hookear sculpin.	
Artediellus simplex	Sp. nov	Valid	Nazarkin	Miocene	Agnevo Formation	Russia (Sakhalin Oblast)	A species of Artediellus.	
Aseraggodes hudsoni	Sp. nov	Valid	Schwarzhans	Altonian		New Zealand	A species of Aseraggodes.	
Auchenoceros simplex	Sp. nov	Valid	Schwarzhans	Duntroonian		New Zealand	A relative of the ahuru.	
Aulichthys miocaenicus	Sp. nov	Valid	Nazarkin	Miocene (Serravallian–Tortonian)	Agnevo Formation	Russia (Sakhalin Oblast)	An extinct tubenose.	
Ausonasynodus	Gen. et sp. nov	Valid	Carnevale et al.	Late Eocene		Spain	A lizardfish. Genus includes new species A. almerai.	
Awamoa	Gen. et comb. et sp. nov	Valid	Schwarzhans	Otaian to Opoitian		New Zealand	A southern sandfish. The type species is "Leptoscopus" progressus Schwarzhans (1980); genus also includes "Leptoscopus" iocosus Schwarzhans (1980) and a new species A. kaawa.	
Balistes vegai	Sp. nov	Valid	Viñola Lopez, Carr & Lorenzo	Miocene		Cuba	A species of Balistes.	
Barathronus nielseni	Sp. nov	Valid	Schwarzhans	Otaian		New Zealand	A species of Barathronus.	
Barbalepis	Gen. et comb. nov	Valid	Olive, Taverne & López-Arbarello	Early Cretaceous (Barremian–Aptian)		Belgium	A member the family Coccolepididae; a new genus for "Coccolepis" macroptera Traquair.	
Bathycongrus waihaoensis	Sp. nov	Valid	Schwarzhans	Kaiatan		New Zealand	A member of the family Congridae. Originally described as a species of Bathycongrus, but subsequently transferred to the genus Smithconger.	
Bathygadus waiohaensis	Sp. nov	Valid	Schwarzhans	Otaian		New Zealand	A species of Bathygadus.	
Bembrops aequiformis	Sp. nov	Valid	Schwarzhans	Duntroonian and Waitakian		New Zealand	A species of Bembrops.	
Bembrops grenfelli	Sp. nov	Valid	Schwarzhans	Altonian		New Zealand	A species of Bembrops.	
Benthosema minutum	Sp. nov	Valid	Schwarzhans	Altonian		New Zealand	A species of Benthosema.	
Bidenichthys struthersi	Sp. nov	Valid	Schwarzhans	Altonian		New Zealand	A species of Bidenichthys.	
Blachea semeniformis	Sp. nov	Valid	Schwarzhans	Waitakian to Altonian		New Zealand	A species of Blachea.	
Bonapartia altidorsalis	Sp. nov	Valid	Schwarzhans	Otaian and Altonian		New Zealand	A member of the family Gonostomatidae.	
Brosmophyciops tongarewae	Sp. nov	Valid	Schwarzhans	Mangaorapan-Heretaungan		New Zealand	A species of Brosmophyciops.	
Burguklia minichorum	Sp. nov	Valid	Bakaev & Kogan	Permian (Wordian–Capitanian)		Russia	An early ray-finned fish. Announced in 2019; the final version of the article naming it was published in 2020.	
Cabindachanos	Gen. et sp. nov	Valid	Taverne et al.	Paleocene (Danian or early Selandian)		Angola	A member of the family Chanidae. The type species is C. dartevellei.	
Callionymus hakatarameaensis	Sp. nov	Valid	Schwarzhans	Waitakian		New Zealand	A species of Callionymus.	
Callionymus triquetrus	Sp. nov	Valid	Schwarzhans	Altonian		New Zealand	A species of Callionymus.	
Candelarialepis	Gen. et sp. nov	Valid	Romano et al.	Early Triassic (Induan)	Candelaria Formation	United States (Nevada)	A stem-neopterygian belonging to the family Parasemionotidae. Genus includes new species C. argentus.	
Cavinichthys	Gen. et sp. nov	Valid	Taverne & Capasso	Early Cretaceous (Albian)	Limestones of Pietraroja	Italy	A member of Crossognathiformes belonging to the family Pachyrhizodontidae. The type species is C. pachylepis.	
Cephalopholis? aotearoa	Sp. nov	Valid	Schwarzhans	Mangaorapan to Bortonian		New Zealand	Possibly a species of Cephalopholis.	
Cepola ambifaria	Sp. nov	Valid	Schwarzhans	Otaian to Clifdenian		New Zealand	A species of Cepola.	
Ceratoscopelus richardsoni	Sp. nov	Valid	Schwarzhans	Otaian and Altonian		New Zealand	A species of Ceratoscopelus.	
Champsodon timaruensis	Sp. nov	Valid	Schwarzhans	Altonian		New Zealand	A species of Champsodon.	
Chaunax bucculentus	Sp. nov	Valid	Schwarzhans	Waitakian		New Zealand	A species of Chaunax.	
Chaychanus	Gen. et sp. nov	Valid	Cantalice Severiano, Alvarado Ortega & Bellwood	Paleocene		Mexico	A member of the family Pomacentridae. Genus includes new species C. gonzalezorum. Announced in 2019; the final version of the article naming it was published in 2020.	
Chrionema salebrosa	Sp. nov	Valid	Schwarzhans	Duntroonian to Altonian		New Zealand	A species of Chrionema.	
Coelorinchus divulgatus	Sp. nov	Valid	Schwarzhans	Waitakian to Lillburnian		New Zealand	A species of Coelorinchus.	
Coelorinchus pakaurangiensis	Sp. nov	Valid	Schwarzhans	Duntroonian to Otaian		New Zealand	A species of Coelorinchus.	
Coelorinchus preaustralis	Sp. nov	Valid	Schwarzhans	Duntroonian to Altonian		New Zealand	A species of Coelorinchus.	
Colobodus wushaensis	Sp. nov	Valid	Li et al.	Late Triassic (Carnian)	Falang Formation	China	A member of Perleidiformes.	
Conger davidsmithi	Sp. nov	Valid	Schwarzhans	Waipawan to Bortonian		New Zealand	A species of Conger.	
Conger tokoroa	Sp. nov	Valid	Schwarzhans	Altonian		New Zealand	A species of Conger.	
Congopycnodus	Gen. et sp. nov	Valid	Taverne	Middle Jurassic	Stanleyville Formation	Democratic Republic of the Congo	A member of Pycnodontiformes belonging to the superfamily Coccodontoidea. The type species is C. cornutus.	
Costapycnodus	Gen. et comb. nov	Valid	Taverne, Capasso & Del Re	Early Cretaceous (late Hauterivian-early Barremian)		Italy	A member of the family Pycnodontidae. The type species is "Coelodus" costae Heckel (1856).	
Danaphos glomerosus	Sp. nov	Valid	Schwarzhans	Otaian		New Zealand	A species of Danaphos.	
Diaphus audax	Sp. nov	Valid	Schwarzhans	Waitakian to Altonian		New Zealand	A species of Diaphus.	
Diaphus caurus	Sp. nov	Valid	Schwarzhans & Ohe	Pleistocene (Calabrian)	Hijikata Formation	Japan	A species of Diaphus.	
Diaphus endoi	Sp. nov	Valid	Schwarzhans & Ohe	Pliocene (Piacenzian)	Shinzato Formation	Japan	A species of Diaphus.	
Diaphus exilis	Sp. nov	Valid	Schwarzhans	Otaian to Lillburnian		New Zealand	A species of Diaphus.	
Diaphus grebneffi	Sp. nov	Valid	Schwarzhans & Ohe	Probably Piacenzian	Nakosi Formation	Fiji	A species of Diaphus.	
Diaphus huatau	Sp. nov	Valid	Schwarzhans	Clifdenian to Lillburnian		New Zealand	A species of Diaphus.	
Diaphus kaiparaensis	Sp. nov	Valid	Schwarzhans	Otaian and Altonian		New Zealand	A species of Diaphus.	
Diaphus kakegawaensis	Sp. nov	Valid	Schwarzhans & Ohe	Pleistocene (Gelasian)	Dainichi Formation	Japan	A species of Diaphus.	
Diaphus manneringi	Sp. nov	Valid	Schwarzhans	Clifdenian to Waiauan		New Zealand	A species of Diaphus.	
Diaphus mirus	Sp. nov	Valid	Schwarzhans	Tongaporutuan		New Zealand	A species of Diaphus.	
Diaphus nafpaktitisi	Sp. nov	Valid	Schwarzhans & Ohe	Pliocene (Piacenzian)	Nobori Formation	Japan	A species of Diaphus.	
Diaphus noboriensis	Sp. nov	Valid	Schwarzhans & Ohe	Pliocene (Piacenzian) and Pleistocene (Gelasian)	Dainichi Formation; Nobori Formation; Shinzato Formation	Japan	A species of Diaphus.	
Diaphus tenax	Sp. nov	Valid	Schwarzhans	Altonian		New Zealand	A species of Diaphus.	
Dibranchus kakahoensis	Sp. nov	Valid	Schwarzhans	Bortonian		New Zealand	A species of Dibranchus.	
Diogenichthys rangiauriensis	Sp. nov	Valid	Schwarzhans	Mangapanian		New Zealand	A species of Diogenichthys.	
Dipulus certus	Sp. nov	Valid	Schwarzhans	Mangaorapan-Heretaungan		New Zealand	A species of Dipulus.	
Dolichopteryx iustus	Sp. nov	Valid	Schwarzhans	Altonian		New Zealand	A species of Dolichopteryx.	
Echiodon teres	Sp. nov	Valid	Schwarzhans	Otaian to Clifdenian		New Zealand	A species of Echiodon.	
Electrona subasperoides	Sp. nov	Valid	Schwarzhans	Waitakian to Altonian		New Zealand	A species of Electrona.	
Ellimma longipectoralis	Sp. nov	Valid	Polck et al.	Early Cretaceous (Aptian)	Barra Velha Formation	Brazil	A member of Clupeomorpha belonging to the group Ellimmichthyiformes and to the family Paraclupeidae. Announced in 2019; the final version of the article naming it was published in 2020.	
Emmelichthys tennysoni	Sp. nov	Valid	Schwarzhans	Waitakian		New Zealand	A species of Emmelichthys.	
Encheliophis strigosus	Sp. nov	Valid	Schwarzhans	Otaian and Altonian		New Zealand	A species of Encheliophis.	
Eomyctophum broncus	Sp. nov	Valid	Schwarzhans	Waipawan to Porangan		New Zealand	A lanternfish.	
Eomyctophum porokawa	Sp. nov	Valid	Schwarzhans	Bortonian		New Zealand	A lanternfish.	
Eosemionotus diskosomus	Sp. nov	Valid	López-Arbarello et al.	Middle Triassic (Ladinian)	Meride Limestone	Italy; Switzerland	A member of Semionotiformes.	
Eosemionotus minutus	Sp. nov	Valid	López-Arbarello et al.	Middle Triassic (Ladinian)	Meride Limestone	Switzerland	A member of Semionotiformes.	
Eosemionotus sceltrichensis	Sp. nov	Valid	López-Arbarello et al.	Middle Triassic (Ladinian)	Meride Limestone	Switzerland	A member of Semionotiformes.	
Epaelops	Gen. et sp. nov	Valid	Alves, Alvarado-Ortega & Brito	Early Cretaceous (Albian)	Tlayúa Formation	Mexico	A member of Elopiformes. Genus includes new species E. martinezi. Announced in 2019; the final version of the article naming it was published in 2020.	
Epigonus aquilonius	Sp. nov	Valid	Schwarzhans	Otaian and Altonian		New Zealand	A species of Epigonus.	
Epigonus opoitiensis	Sp. nov	Valid	Schwarzhans	Opoitian		New Zealand	A species of Epigonus.	
Etrumeus carnatus	Sp. nov	Valid	Schwarzhans	Altonian		New Zealand	A species of Etrumeus.	
Evynnis abax	Sp. nov	Valid	Schwarzhans	Duntroonian to Altonian		New Zealand	A member of the family Sparidae.	
Flagellipinna	Gen. et sp. nov	Valid	Cawley & Kriwet	Late Cretaceous (Cenomanian)	Sannine Formation	Lebanon	A member of Pycnodontiformes belonging to the family Pycnodontidae. The type species is F. rhomboides.	
Forsterygion jawadi	Sp. nov	Valid	Schwarzhans	Nukumaruan		New Zealand	A species of Forsterygion.	
Gadiculus adversus	Sp. nov	Valid	Schwarzhans	Waitakian to Lillburnian		New Zealand	A species of Gadiculus.	
Gadiculus pereawa	Sp. nov	Valid	Schwarzhans	Tongaporutuan		New Zealand	A species of Gadiculus.	
Galeichthys ohei	Sp. nov	Valid	Schwarzhans	Opoitian to Nukumaruan		New Zealand	A species of Galeichthys.	
Gilmourella	Gen. et sp. nov.	Valid	Carnevale & Bannikov	Eocene (late Ypresian)	Monte Bolca locality	Italy	A member of Callionymoidei. The type species is G. minuta.	
Gnathophis araroa	Sp. nov	Valid	Schwarzhans	Kapitean		New Zealand	A species of Gnathophis.	
Gonostoma retunsum	Sp. nov	Valid	Schwarzhans	Otaian and Altonian		New Zealand	A species of Gonostoma.	
Grahamichthys frigophila	Sp. nov	Valid	Schwarzhans	Altonian		New Zealand	A member of the family Thalasseleotrididae.	
Guus	Gen. et comb. nov.	Valid	Bannikov	Eocene (late Ypresian)	Monte Bolca locality	Italy	A member of the family Tortonesidae. The type species is "Gobius" microcephalus Agassiz (1839).	
Gyrodus huiliches	Sp. nov	Valid	Gouiric-Cavalli, Remírez & Kriwet	Early Cretaceous (Valanginian–early Hauterivian)	Agrio Formation	Argentina		
Harpagifer? morgansi	Sp. nov	Valid	Schwarzhans	Altonian		New Zealand	Possibly a species of Harpagifer.	
Hemerocoetes pukunati	Sp. nov	Valid	Schwarzhans	Duntroonian to Altonian		New Zealand	A species of Hemerocoetes.	
Hemerocoetes whiroki	Sp. nov	Valid	Schwarzhans	Duntroonian to Altonian		New Zealand	A species of Hemerocoetes.	
Hiascoactinus	Gen. et sp. nov	Valid	Kim et al.	Late Triassic	Amisan Formation	South Korea	A member of Redfieldiiformes. Genus includes new species H. boryeongensis. Announced in 2019; the final version of the article naming it was published in 2020.	
Hintonia robertsi	Sp. nov	Valid	Schwarzhans	Otaian		New Zealand	A lanternfish.	
Howella monodens	Sp. nov	Valid	Schwarzhans	Otaian		New Zealand	A species of Howella.	
Hygophum acutiventris	Sp. nov	Valid	Schwarzhans	Kapitean		New Zealand	A species of Hygophum.	
Ichthyscopus pukeuriensis	Sp. nov	Valid	Schwarzhans	Otaian and Altonian		New Zealand	A species of Ichthyscopus.	
Klincigobius	Gen. et comb. et sp. nov	Valid	Bradić-Milinović, Ahnelt & Schwarzhans in Bradić-Milinović et al.	Early Miocene		Serbia	A member of the family Gobiidae. The type species is "Gobius" serbiensis Gaudant (1998); genus also includes new species K. andjelkovicae.	
Kradimus	Gen. et sp. nov	Valid	Veysey, Brito & Martill	Late Cretaceous (Turonian)	Akrabou Formation	Morocco	A member of Crossognathiformes. Genus includes new species K. asflaensis. Announced in 2019; the final version of the article naming it was published in 2020.	
Lactarius primigenius	Sp. nov	Valid	Schwarzhans	Bortonian to Kaiatan		New Zealand	A relative of the false trevally.	
Lactarius pusillus	Sp. nov	Valid	Schwarzhans	Otaian and Altonian		New Zealand	A relative of the false trevally.	
Laeops undulatus	Sp. nov	Valid	Schwarzhans	Lillburnian		New Zealand	A species of Laeops.	
Lampanyctodes transitivus	Sp. nov	Valid	Schwarzhans	Kapitean		New Zealand	A lanternfish.	
Lampanyctus popoto	Sp. nov	Valid	Schwarzhans	Otaian and Altonian		New Zealand	A species of Lampanyctus.	
Lampanyctus profestus	Sp. nov	Valid	Schwarzhans	Otaian and Altonian		New Zealand	A species of Lampanyctus.	
Lampanyctus waiohaensis	Sp. nov	Valid	Schwarzhans	Otaian		New Zealand	A species of Lampanyctus.	
Lashanichthys	Gen. et comb. nov	Valid	Xu et al.	Middle Triassic (Anisian)		China	A member of Ginglymodi assigned to the group Kyphosichthyiformes and to the new family Lashanichthyidae. The type species is "Sangiorgioichthys" sui López-Arbarello et al. (2011); genus also includes "Sangiorgioichthys" yangjuanensis Chen et al. (2014).	
Latellopsis	Gen. et comb. nov.	Valid	Bannikov & Zorzin	Eocene (late Ypresian)	Monte Bolca locality	Italy	A member of Perciformes of uncertain phylogenetic placement. The type species is "Psettopsis" latellai Bannikov (2005).	
Lepidorhynchus frosti	Sp. nov	Valid	Schwarzhans	Altonian		New Zealand	A member of the family Macrouridae.	
Leptoscopus atavus	Sp. nov	Valid	Schwarzhans	Altonian		New Zealand	A southern sandfish.	
Lethrinus? crassiornatus	Sp. nov	Valid	Schwarzhans	Mangaorapan-Heretaungan		New Zealand	Possibly a species of Lethrinus.	
Lindoeichthys	Gen. et sp. nov.	Valid	Murray et al.	Late Cretaceous (Maastrichtian)	Scollard Formation	Canada (Alberta)	A member of Percopsiformes. Genus includes new species L. albertensis. Announced in 2019; the final version of the article naming it was published in 2020.	
Liparis? hampdenensis	Sp. nov	Valid	Schwarzhans	Bortonian		New Zealand	Possibly a species of Liparis.	
Loancorhynchus	Gen. et sp. nov	Valid	Otero	Middle Eocene	Millongue Formation	Chile	A relative of the swordfish. The type species is L. catrillancai.	
Lophiodes hoi	Sp. nov	Valid	Schwarzhans	Altonian		New Zealand	A species of Lophiodes.	
Lophius alveolus	Sp. nov	Valid	Schwarzhans	Altonian		New Zealand	A species of Lophius.	
Lophius onokensis	Sp. nov	Valid	Schwarzhans	Mangapanian to Nukumaruan		New Zealand	A species of Lophius.	
Lotella matata	Sp. nov	Valid	Schwarzhans	Otaian and Altonian		New Zealand	A species of Lotella.	
Lotella pfeili	Sp. nov	Valid	Schwarzhans	Altonian and Clifdenian		New Zealand	A species of Lotella.	
Lotella spicata	Sp. nov	Valid	Schwarzhans	Mangaorapan-Heretaungan		New Zealand	A species of Lotella.	
Macrurulus depressus	Sp. nov	Valid	Schwarzhans	Bortonian		New Zealand	A member of the family Merlucciidae.	
Macrurulus fordycei	Sp. nov	Valid	Schwarzhans	Waipawan-Mangaorapan		New Zealand	A member of the family Merlucciidae.	
Maoricottus	Gen. et comb. et 2 sp. nov	Valid	Schwarzhans	Altonian to Lillburnian		New Zealand	A member of the family Cottidae. The type species is "Cottidarum" impolitus Schwarzhans (1980); genus also includes new species M. calidophilus and M. ovatus.	
Melamphaes leeae	Sp. nov	Valid	Schwarzhans	Otaian		New Zealand	A species of Melamphaes.	
Moradebrichthys	Gen. et sp. nov	Valid	Cartanyà et al.	Middle Triassic (Ladinian)		Spain	A member of the family Perleididae. Genus includes new species M. vilasecae.	
Muraenanguilla	Gen. et comb. et 2 sp. nov	Valid	Schwarzhans	Paleocene and Eocene		Belgium; New Zealand	A member of Anguilloidei of uncertain phylogenetic placement. The type species is Otolithus (Trachini)" thevenini Priem (1906); genus also includes new species M. balegemensis and M. lacinata.	
Myctophum bortonensis	Sp. nov	Valid	Schwarzhans	Bortonian		New Zealand	A species of Myctophum.	
Myctophum tamumuensis	Sp. nov	Valid	Schwarzhans	Clifdenian to Waiauan		New Zealand	A species of Myctophum.	
Myctophum tenellum	Sp. nov	Valid	Schwarzhans	Tongaporutuan		New Zealand	A species of Myctophum.	
Mystocheilus	Gen. et sp. nov	Valid	Van Tassell & Smith	Pliocene (Blancan)		United States (Oregon)	A member of the family Cyprinidae. The type species is M. fresti.	
Nemadactylus trulliformis	Sp. nov	Valid	Schwarzhans	Altonian		New Zealand	A species of Nemadactylus.	
Nemadactylus utoka	Sp. nov	Valid	Schwarzhans	Waitakian	Otekaike Limestone	New Zealand	A species of Nemadactylus.	
Neobythites turpidus	Sp. nov	Valid	Schwarzhans	Runangan		New Zealand	A species of Neobythites.	
Nezumia morgansi	Sp. nov	Valid	Schwarzhans	Bortonian and Kaiatan		New Zealand	A species of Nezumia.	
Notoconger	Gen. et 2 sp. nov	Valid	Schwarzhans	Runangan to Altonian		New Zealand	A member of the family Congridae. The type species is N. hesperis; genus also includes N. devexus.	
Notoscopelus effertus	Sp. nov	Valid	Schwarzhans	Kapitean		New Zealand	A species of Notoscopelus.	
Notoscopelus praejaponicus	Sp. nov	Valid	Schwarzhans & Ohe	Pleistocene (Calabrian)	Chinen Formation; Hijikata Formation	Japan	A species of Notoscopelus.	
Opistognathus wharekuriensis	Sp. nov	Valid	Schwarzhans	Duntroonian		New Zealand	A species of Opistognathus.	
Oreochromimos	Gen. et sp. nov		Penk et al.	Miocene	Ngorora Formation	Kenya	A cichlid belonging to the tribe Oreochromini. The type species is O. kabchorensis.	
Padangia	Gen. et comb. nov	Valid	Murray	Probably Eocene		Indonesia	A member of the family Cyprinidae. Genus includes "Sardinioides" amblyostoma von der Marck (1876).	
Panturichthys grenfelli	Sp. nov	Valid	Schwarzhans	Otaian		New Zealand	A species of Panturichthys.	
Paralabrus	Gen. et sp. nov.	Valid	Bannikov & Zorzin	Eocene (late Ypresian)	Monte Bolca locality	Italy	Possibly a wrasse. The type species is P. rossiae.	
Parapercis bispicatus	Sp. nov	Valid	Schwarzhans	Otaian and Altonian		New Zealand	A species of Parapercis.	
Parapercis depressidorsalis	Sp. nov	Valid	Schwarzhans	Waitakian to Altonian		New Zealand	A species of Parapercis.	
Parapercis fatoides	Sp. nov	Valid	Schwarzhans	Otaian		New Zealand	A species of Parapercis.	
Parapercis pareoraensis	Sp. nov	Valid	Schwarzhans	Altonian		New Zealand	A species of Parapercis.	
Parapercis richardsoni	Sp. nov	Valid	Schwarzhans	Waipawan to Porangan		New Zealand	A species of Parapercis.	
Parapercis waiwaia	Sp. nov	Valid	Schwarzhans	Opoitian		New Zealand	A species of Parapercis.	
Parascombrops giganteus	Sp. nov	Valid	Schwarzhans	Mangaorapan		New Zealand	A member of the family Acropomatidae.	
Parascombrops schwarzhansi	Sp. nov	Valid	Van Hinsbergh & Helwerda	Late Pliocene to early Pleistocene		Philippines	A member of the family Acropomatidae.	
Paraulopus rallus	Sp. nov	Valid	Schwarzhans	Bortonian		New Zealand	A species of Paraulopus.	
Pelargorhynchus grandis	Sp. nov		Wallaard et al.	Late Cretaceous (Maastrichtian)	Maastricht Formation	Netherlands	A member of Aulopiformes belonging to the family Dercetidae. Originally described as a species of Pelargorhynchus, but subsequently made the type species of the separate genus Beukidercetis.	
Pempheris hurupiensis	Sp. nov	Valid	Schwarzhans	Tongaporutuan	Hurupi Formation	New Zealand	A species of Pempheris.	
Phractocephalus yaguaron	Sp. nov	Valid	Bogan & Agnolín	Late Miocene		Argentina	A relative of the redtail catfish.	
Physiculus beui	Sp. nov	Valid	Schwarzhans	Otaian and Altonian		New Zealand	A species of Physiculus.	
Platycephalus? iaiunus	Sp. nov	Valid	Schwarzhans	Mangaorapan to Bortonian		New Zealand	Possibly a species of Platycephalus.	
Platycephalus? riremoana	Sp. nov	Valid	Schwarzhans	Runangan		New Zealand	Possibly a species of Platycephalus.	
Platysiagum sinensis	Sp. nov	Valid	Wen et al.	Middle Triassic (Anisian)	Guanling Formation	China		
Protomyctophum ahunga	Sp. nov	Valid	Schwarzhans	Altonian		New Zealand	A species of Protomyctophum.	
Pseudaequalobythites	Gen. et sp. et comb. nov	Valid	Schwarzhans	Paleocene and Eocene		Belgium; France; Germany; New Zealand; United Kingdom	A member of the family Ophidiidae. The type species is P. biplex; genus also includes "Otolithus" hilgendorfi Koken (1891).	
Pseudanthias multicrenatus	Sp. nov	Valid	Schwarzhans	Mangaorapan to Bortonian		New Zealand	A species of Pseudanthias.	
Pseudocaranx? pertenuis	Sp. nov	Valid	Schwarzhans	Altonian		New Zealand	Possibly a species of Pseudocaranx.	
Pseudophycis muringa	Sp. nov	Valid	Schwarzhans	Lillburnian		New Zealand	A species of Pseudophycis.	
Pterygotrigla stewarti	Sp. nov	Valid	Schwarzhans	Otaian and Altonian		New Zealand	A species of Pterygotrigla.	
Pteronisculus nevadanus	Sp. nov	Valid	Romano et al.	Early Triassic (Induan)	Candelaria Formation	United States (Nevada)	Possibly a member of the family Turseoidae.	
Pycnodus multicuspidatus	Sp. nov	Valid	Vullo et al.	Paleocene (Thanetian)		Morocco		
Quasinectes	Gen. et sp. nov.	Valid	Bannikov & Zorzin	Eocene (late Ypresian)	Monte Bolca locality	Italy	A member of Perciformes of uncertain phylogenetic placement. The type species is Q. durello.	
Rebekkachromis	Gen. et 2 sp. nov	Valid	Kevrekidis, Valtl & Reichenbacher in Kevrekidis et al.	Miocene	Ngorora Formation	Kenya	A cichlid belonging to the subfamily Pseudocrenilabrinae and the tribe Oreochromini. The type species is R. ngororus; genus also includes R. kiptalami.	
Rhamphogobius	Gen. et sp. et comb. nov	Valid	Bradić-Milinović, Ahnelt & Schwarzhans in Bradić-Milinović et al.	Early Miocene		Croatia; Germany; Serbia; Switzerland	A member of the family Gobiidae. The type species is R. varidens; genus also includes "Gobius" doppleri Reichenbacher (1993), "Gobius" gregori Reichenbacher (1993) and "Gobius" helvetiae Salis (1967).	
Rhynchoconger otaianus	Sp. nov	Valid	Schwarzhans	Waipawan-Mangaorapan		New Zealand	A species of Rhynchoconger.	
Saccogaster parengarenga	Sp. nov	Valid	Schwarzhans	Otaian to Clifdenian		New Zealand	A species of Saccogaster.	
Sardinella claviformis	Sp. nov	Valid	Schwarzhans	Altonian		New Zealand	A species of Sardinella.	
Sardinella lintriculus	Sp. nov	Valid	Schwarzhans	Altonian		New Zealand	A species of Sardinella.	
Schernfeldfuro	Gen. et sp. nov	Valid	Ebert	Late Jurassic		Germany	A member of Halecomorphi. Genus includes new species S. uweelleri.	
Scleropages sanshuiensis	Sp. nov	Valid	Zhang	Early Eocene	Huachong Formation	China	A species of Scleropages. Announced in 2019; the final version of the article naming it was published in 2020.	
Scopelarchoides neamticus	Sp. nov	Valid	Grădianu et al.	Oligocene	Lower Dysodilic Shales Formation	Romania	A pearleye, a species of Scopelarchoides.	
Scopelosaurus? brevicauda	Sp. nov	Valid	Schwarzhans	Kaiatan		New Zealand	Possibly species of Scopelosaurus.	
Sillaginodes albisaxosus	Sp. nov	Valid	Schwarzhans	Altonian		New Zealand	A member of the family Sillaginidae.	
Sillago maxwelli	Sp. nov	Valid	Schwarzhans	Bortonian		New Zealand	A species of Sillago.	
Sprattus arewhana	Sp. nov	Valid	Schwarzhans	Otaian		New Zealand	A species of Sprattus.	
Sundabarbus	Gen. et comb. nov	Valid	Murray	Probably Eocene	Sangkarewang Formation	Indonesia	A member of the family Cyprinidae. Genus includes "Barbus" megacephalus Günther (1876).	
Symbolophorus moriguchii	Sp. nov	Valid	Schwarzhans & Ohe	Pliocene (Piacenzian) and Pleistocene (Gelasian)	Dainichi Formation; Nobori Formation; Shinzato Formation	Japan	A species of Symbolophorus.	
Symbolophorus opononiensis	Sp. nov	Valid	Schwarzhans	Waitakian and Otaian		New Zealand	A species of Symbolophorus.	
Symbolophorus tongaporutuensis	Sp. nov	Valid	Schwarzhans	Tongaporutuan		New Zealand	A species of Symbolophorus.	
Symphysanodon inamata	Sp. nov	Valid	Schwarzhans	Mangaorapan to Bortonian		New Zealand	A species of Symphysanodon.	
Thalasseleotris whatua	Sp. nov	Valid	Schwarzhans	Lillburnian		New Zealand	A species of Thalasseleotris.	
Tharsis elleri	Sp. nov	Valid	Arratia, Schultze & Tischlinger	Late Jurassic (Tithonian)	Altmühltal Formation	Germany	A teleost belonging to the family Ascalaboidae.	
Thiollierepycnodus	Gen. et comb. nov	Valid	Ebert	Late Jurassic		France; Germany	A member of the family Pycnodontidae; a new genus for Pycnodus wagneri Thiollière (1852).	
Thryptodus loomisi	Sp. nov	Valid	Shimada	Late Cretaceous (Cenomanian–Turonian)	Britton Formation	United States (Texas)	A member of the family Plethodidae.	
Tonganago wharenga	Sp. nov	Valid	Schwarzhans	Waipawan to Bortonian		New Zealand	A member of the family Congridae.	
Tongarewa	Gen. et 2 sp. nov	Valid	Schwarzhans	Duntroonian to Altonian		New Zealand	A threefin blenny. The type species is T. waihaoensis; genus also includes T. clementsi.	
Toroatherina	Gen. et sp. et comb. nov	Valid	Schwarzhans	Eocene		New Zealand; United States	An Old World silverside. The type species is T. toroa; genus also includes "Otolithus (Mugilidarum)" debilis Koken (1891).	
Toxopyge	Gen. et sp. et comb. nov	Valid	Bradić-Milinović, Ahnelt & Schwarzhans in Bradić-Milinović et al.	Early Miocene		Serbia; Switzerland	A member of the family Gobiidae. The type species is T. campylus; genus also includes "Gobius" longus Salis (1967).	
Trachyrincus aulax	Sp. nov	Valid	Schwarzhans	Otaian to Tongaporutuan		New Zealand	A species of Trachyrincus.	
Tranawuen	Gen. et comb. nov	Valid	Gouiric-Cavalli, Remírez & Kriwet	Early Cretaceous (Valanginian–early Hauterivian)	Agrio Formation	Argentina	A member of Pycnodontiformes. Genus includes "Macromesodon" agrioensis.	
Trawdenia	Gen. et comb. nov	Valid	Coates & Tietjen	Carboniferous (Pennsylvanian)		United Kingdom	An early ray-finned fish. The type species is "Rhadinichthys" planti Traquair (1888); genus also includes "Mesopoma" carricki Coates (1993) and "Mesopoma" pancheni Coates (1993).	
Tunisiaclupea	Gen. et sp. nov	Valid	Boukhalfa et al.	Early Cretaceous (Barremian)	Chotts Basin	Tunisia	A member of Clupeomorpha belonging to the group Ellimmichthyiformes and to the family Paraclupeidae. Genus includes new species T. speratus.	
Uranoscopus rudis	Sp. nov	Valid	Schwarzhans	Duntroonian	Chatton Formation	New Zealand	A species of Uranoscopus.	
Uranoscopus tectiformis	Sp. nov	Valid	Schwarzhans	Altonian		New Zealand	A species of Uranoscopus.	
Valenciennellus fastigatus	Sp. nov	Valid	Schwarzhans	Otaian and Altonian		New Zealand	A species of Valenciennellus.	
Veridagon	Gen. et sp. nov	Valid	Díaz-Cruz, Alvarado-Ortega & Carbot-Chanona	Late Cretaceous (Cenomanian)	Cintalapa Formation	Mexico	A member of Aulopiformes belonging to the family Enchodontidae. Genus includes new species V. avendanoi.	
Vinciguerria orientalis	Sp. nov	Valid	Nam, Ko & Nazarkin	Middle Miocene	Duho Formation	South Korea	A species of Vinciguerria.	
Waihaoclupea	Gen. et sp. nov	Valid	Schwarzhans	Mangaorapan to Bortonian		New Zealand	A member of the family Clupeidae. The type species is W. pinguis.	
Waitahana	Gen. et comb. nov	Valid	Schwarzhans	Otaian to Waiauan		New Zealand	A southern sandfish. The type species is "Trachinoideorum" sagittiformis Schwarzhans (1980); genus also includes "Citharus" latisulcatus Frost (1924) and "Trachinoideorum" ultimus Schwarzhans (1980).	
Waitakia aho	Sp. nov	Valid	Schwarzhans	Mangaorapan to Porangan		New Zealand	A member of the family Hemerocoetidae.	
Waitakia proclinens	Sp. nov	Valid	Schwarzhans	Mangaorapan to Bortonian		New Zealand	A member of the family Hemerocoetidae.	
Waitakia profunda	Sp. nov	Valid	Schwarzhans	Kaiatan to Runangan		New Zealand	A member of the family Hemerocoetidae.	
Xenocephalus otaianus	Sp. nov	Valid	Schwarzhans	Otaian		New Zealand	A species of Xenocephalus.	
Yudaiichthys	Gen. et sp. nov	Valid	Xu et al.	Middle Triassic (Anisian)	Guanling Formation	China	A member of Ginglymodi assigned to the group Kyphosichthyiformes and to the new family Lashanichthyidae. The type species is Y. eximius.	
Zandtfuro	Gen. et sp. nov	Valid	Ebert	Late Jurassic		Germany	A member of Halecomorphi. Genus includes new species Z. tischlingeri.	
Zonobythites cornifer	Sp. nov	Valid	Schwarzhans	Porangan and Bortonian		New Zealand	A member of the family Ophidiidae.	

=== Lobe-finned fishes ===
Name	Novelty	Status	Authors	Age	Type locality	Country	Notes	Images
Anchidipterus	Gen. et sp. nov	Valid	Krupina in Lebedev, Krupina & Linkevich	Devonian (Famennian)		Russia (Tver Oblast)	A lungfish. Genus includes new species A. dariae.	
Clackodus	Gen. et comb. nov	Valid	Smithson, Challands & Smithson	Carboniferous (Serpukhovian)	Clackmannan Group	United Kingdom	A lungfish; a new genus for "Ctenodus" angustulus Traquair.	
Ctenodus boudariensis	Sp. nov	Valid	Kemp	Carboniferous (Viséan)	Ducabrook Formation	Australia	A lungfish.	
Isityumzi	Gen. et sp. nov	Valid	Gess & Clement	Devonian (Famennian)	Witpoort Formation	South Africa	A lungfish. The type species is I. mlomomde.	
Limanichthys	Gen. et sp. nov	Valid	Challands et al.	Carboniferous (Tournaisian)	Ballagan Formation	United Kingdom	A lungfish. Genus includes new species L. fraseri.	
Rubrognathus	Gen. et sp. nov	Valid	Lebedev & Clément	Devonian (late Givetian–early Frasnian)	Yam-Tesovo Formation	Russia (Leningrad Oblast)	A member of Elpistostegalia. The type species is R. kuleshovi.	
Selenodus	Gen. et sp. nov	Valid	Mondéjar-Fernández	Devonian (Eifelian)		Morocco	An onychodont sarcopterygian. Genus includes new species S. aquesbiae.	
Whiteia uyenoteruyai	Sp. nov	Valid	Yabumoto et al.	Early Triassic	Middle Sakamena Group	Madagascar		

=== Other fishes ===
Name	Novelty	Status	Authors	Age	Type locality	Country	Notes	Images
Aberrosquama	Gen. et sp. nov	Valid	Burrow in Burrow et al.	Silurian (probably Gorstian)	Hamelin Formation	Australia	A stem-gnathostome of uncertain phylogenetic placement. The type species is A. occidens.	

== General research ==
- Revision of Early Devonian psammosteids described by Beverly Halstead from the so-called "Placoderm Sandstone" (Świętokrzyskie Mountains, Poland) is published by Dec (2019).
- A study on the locomotion of psammosteids, focusing on the influence of the shape of the psammosteid body form on hydrodynamic performance, is published by Dec (2019).
- A study on the anatomy of dermal plates of Astraspis is published by Lemierre & Germain (2019), who report possible evidence of presence of proliferative cartilage in this taxon.
- A study on the anatomy of the circulatory system of the head of Shuyu is published by Gai, Zhu & Donoghue (2019).
- Redescription of Sinogaleaspis shankouensis, based on data from 11 new specimens from the Silurian Xikeng Formation (Jiangxi, China), is published online by Gai et al. (2019).
- A study on the anatomy of the dermal skeleton of Tremataspis mammillata is published by O'Shea, Keating & Donoghue (2019).
- Redescription of Asterolepis orcadensis based on newly collected fossil material is published by Newman, den Blaauwen & Leather (2019).
- A study on the morphology of the jaw elements of a buchanosteoid placoderm specimen ANU V244 from the Early Devonian limestones (~400 Ma) at Burrinjuck, near Canberra (Australia) is published by Hu et al. (2019).
- A specimen of Dunkleosteus terrelli preserving vertebrae fused into a structure known as the synarcual is described from the Devonian Cleveland Shale Member of the Ohio Shale Formation (Ohio, United States) by Johanson et al. (2019).
- A redescription and a study on the phylogenetic relationships of a putative antiarch Silurolepis platydorsalis is published by Zhu, Lu & Zhu (2019), who reinterpret this species as a maxillate placoderm close to Qilinyu.
- New body fossils of Cheiracanthus intricatus, including the first known articulated specimen of this species, are described from the Givetian Tordalen Formation (Spitsbergen, Norway) by Newman, Burrow & den Blaauwen (2019).
- A study on the anatomy of the skeletal elements of the pharynx of Ptomacanthus anglicus, and on its implications for the knowledge of the evolution of the pharynx of jawed vertebrates, is published by Dearden, Stockey & Brazeau (2019).
- Description of fossils of Carboniferous (Mississippian) cartilaginous fishes from the area of Krzeszowice (Poland) is published by Ginter & Złotnik (2019).
- A study on microwear on teeth of Edestus minor, and on its implications for the knowledge of function of teeth of this fish, is published by Itano (2019).
- A revision of species belonging to the genus Edestus is published by Tapanila & Pruitt (2019).
- Discovery of a cast of the holotype of Petalodus ohioensis in the collections of the Yale Peabody Museum of Natural History is reported by Carpenter & Itano (2019), who consider the species Petalodus alleghaniensis to be a junior synonym of P. ohioensis.
- Restudy of a putative bill of an ibis-like bird from the Eocene La Meseta Formation (Antarctica) described by Jadwiszczak, Gaździcki & Tatur (2008) is published by Agnolin, Bogan & Rozadilla (2019), who consider this specimen to be more likely to be a dorsal spine of a chimaeroid cartilaginous fish.
- A study on the anatomy of the skull of Tristychius arcuatus, providing evidence of adaptations for suction feeding, is published by Coates et al. (2019).
- Teeth of a hybodont shark belonging to the genus Asteracanthus, with anatomy indicative of a crushing feeding behaviour, are described from the Upper Jurassic deposits of the Monte Nerone Pelagic Carbonate Platform, in the Umbria-Marche-Sabina Palaeogeographic Domain (Italy) by Citton et al. (2019).
- An association of 58 teeth of Ptychodus anonymus, representing the first occurrence of an associated dentition of this species, is described from the Cenomanian Jetmore Member of the Greenhorn Formation (Kansas, United States) by Hamm (2019).
- Description of new associated skeletal remains of Ischyrhiza mira from the Upper Cretaceous of Tennessee and Alabama and a study on the paleobiology of this species is published by Sternes & Shimada (2019).
- A study on the anatomy and phylogenetic relationships of Promyliobatis gazolai is published by Marramà et al. (2019).
- Fossils of members of the genus Aetomylaeus are described from localities in Peru and Chile by Villafaña et al. (2019), representing the first unambiguous fossil record of this genus from the Neogene of the southeastern Pacific.
- A specimen of the whiptail stingray species Tethytrygon muricatus preserving the uterus bearing four eggs is described from the Eocene of the Monte Bolca locality (Italy) by Fanti, Mazzuferi & Marramà (2019).
- Description of Langhian ray fossils from the Lower Tagus Basin (Portugal) is published by Fialho, Balbino & Antues (2019).
- A study on the taxonomic status and geological age of large shark remains from the Upper Cretaceous of the Castellavazzo locality (Italy) discovered in the 19th century is published by Conte et al. (2019).
- 15 partial skeletons of lamniform sharks, including the largest specimen of Cretoxyrhina mantelli known to date, are described from the Upper Cretaceous Scaglia Rossa Formation (Italy) by Amalfitano et al. (2019), who also review the taxonomic history of C. mantelli.
- A study on teeth histology and mineralization pattern in lamniform sharks, based on data from extant and fossil taxa (including enigmatic galeomorph shark Palaeocarcharias stromeri), is published by Jambura et al. (2019).
- A study on changes of diversity of lamniform sharks throughout their evolutionary history, aiming to determine the causes of their decline in the last 20 million years, is published by Condamine, Romieu & Guinot (2019).
- A study on changes in the presence or absence of lateral cusplets on teeth of members of the genus Carcharocles from the Calvert, Choptank, and St. Marys Formations, and on their implications for the transition of shark populations from these formations from a Carcharocles chubutensis-dominated population to one dominated by C. megalodon, is published by Perez et al. (2019).
- A revision and a reevaluation of the reliability of all post-Messinian occurrences of Otodus megalodon in marine strata from western North America, and a study on the timing of extinction of this species, is published by Boessenecker et al. (2019).
- A study on the body size of Otodus megalodon, as inferred from the relationship between the ontogenetic development of teeth and total body length in the great white shark, is published by Shimada (2019).
- Partial forelimb of a rorqual with several shark bite marks is described from the Pliocene Burica Formation (Panama) by Cortés et al. (2019).
- A study on the anatomy of the holotype specimen of a putative Paleocene shark Platyacrodus unicus is published by Bogan, Agnolin & Ezcurra (2019), who reinterpret this specimen as a carapace of a small retroplumid crab belonging to the genus Costacopluma.
- An assemblage of well-preserved isolated teeth of elasmobranchs is described from the late Oligocene of the North Alpine Foreland Basin (Austria) by Feichtinger et al. (2019).
- Description of the deep-sea elasmobranch fauna from the Miocene Yatsuo Group in central Japan, including the first fossil occurrences of the genera Arhynchobatis and Pseudoraja, will be published by Nishimatsu & Ujihara (2019).
- Description of the deep-sea elasmobranch fossils from the Miocene Makino Formation in southwest Japan, including the first fossil occurrences of the genera Springeria and Narke, is published by Nishimatsu (2019).
- A study on Paleocene cartilaginous fish fossils from the Lower Clayton Limestone Unit of the Midway Group near Malvern, Arkansas, evaluating the implications of these fossils for the knowledge of cartilaginous fish diversity across the Cretaceous-Paleogene boundary in the Malvern region and Gulf Coastal Plain of southwestern Arkansas, is published online by Maisch, Becker & Griffiths (2019).
- A study on the morphology of scales and squamation pattern in Guiyu oneiros is published by Cui, Qiao & Zhu (2019).
- A study on the anatomy and phylogenetic relationships of Brazilichthys macrognathus is published by Figueroa, Friedman & Gallo (2019).
- Permian species Palaeothrissum inaequilobum Blainville (1818) and P. parvum Blainville (1818) are found to be senior synonyms of the widely used species name Aeduella blainvillei (Agassiz, 1833) by Brignon (2019). Conditions exist for reversal of precedence and Aeduella blainvillei is declared nomen protectum.
- A study on the anatomy of the jaws, palate and teeth of Eurynotus crenatus is published by Friedman et al. (2019).
- New specimen of Birgeria liui, representing the most complete and articulated postcranial skeleton of an adult specimen of Birgeria reported so far, is described from the Ladinian of South China by Ni et al. (2019).
- Fossil remains of a spiral valve are reported in a specimen of Peipiaosteus pani from the Lower Cretaceous Yixian Formation (China) by Capasso (2019).
- Teeth of members of the genus Pycnodus are described from the Upper Cretaceous Cap de Naze marine formation (Senegal) by Capasso (2019).
- Description of a partial skeleton of Micropycnodon kansasensis from the Smoky Hill Chalk Member of the Niobrara Chalk (Kansas, United States), providing new information on the anatomy of this species, is published by Cronin & Shimada (2019).
- A study on the paleobiology of specimens of Nursallia gutturosum from the Cenomanian-Turonian platy limestone deposit of Vallecillo (north-eastern Mexico) is published by Stinnesbeck, Rust & Herder (2019).
- A study on the anatomy and phylogenetic relationships of Robustichthys luopingensis is published by Xu (2019).
- Fossil teeth representing the first evidence of Late Jurassic ginglymodians from Mt. Nerone in the Umbria-Marche-Sabina Domain (Italy) are described by Romano et al. (2019).
- A study on the anatomy and phylogenetic relationships of "Lepidotes" bernissartensis is published online by Cavin, Deesri & Olive (2019), who transfer this species to the genus Scheenstia.
- A study on the internal anatomy of a left jaw of a member of the genus Scheenstia from the Kimmeridgian Reuchenette Formation (Switzerland) is published online by Leuzinger et al. (2019), who describe a peculiar tooth replacement mode in this specimen.
- A study on the stomach contents of two specimens of Lepidotes from the Lower Jurassic of Germany is published online by Thies, Stevens & Stumpf (2019).
- Six new occurrences of Belonostomus, documenting the biogeographic and biostratigraphic range of this genus in North America, are reported from the Upper Cretaceous of Texas, Alabama and Mississippi by Van Vranken, Fielitz & Ebersole (2019).
- A study on the diversity of pectoral fin shape amongst members of Pachycormiformes is published by Liston et al. (2019).
- A study on the anatomy of the skull of Martillichthys renwickae is published online by Dobson et al. (2019).
- Fossil remains of a member or a relative of the genus Asthenocormus are described from the Upper Jurassic of the Ameghino (= Nordenskjöld) Formation of the Antarctic Peninsula by Gouiric-Cavalli et al. (2019), representing the first record of a suspension-feeding pachycormid from the Upper Jurassic of the Antarctic Peninsula and the oldest pachycormid yet recovered from Antarctica.
- New, three-dimensionally preserved specimens of Pachycormus are described from the Toarcian of Strawberry Bank at Ilminster (Somerset, United Kingdom) by Cawley et al. (2019).
- A study on the anatomy of Pleuropholis decastroi from the Lower Cretaceous (Albian) limestones of Pietraroja (Province of Benevento, Italy) and on the phylogenetic relationships of the family Pleuropholidae is published by Taverne & Capasso (2019).
- A study on the anatomy and phylogenetic relationships of the teleost species Majokia brasseuri from the Middle Jurassic Stanleyville Formation (Democratic Republic of the Congo) is published by Taverne (2019), who names a new order Majokiiformes.
- A study on the anatomy, jaw mechanics and phylogenetic relationships of Dugaldia emmilta is published by Cavin & Berrell (2019).
- A juvenile specimen of Xiphactinus audax, representing the smallest specimen of this species reported so far, will be described from the Cretaceous Niobrara Chalk (Kansas, United States) by King & Super (2019).
- A study on the internal structure of a fossil specimen of Notelops brama, investigated by neutron tomography, is published by Pugliesi et al. (2019).
- A study on the anatomy and phylogenetic relationships of Cavenderichthys talbragarensis and Waldmanichthys koonwarri is published online by Bean & Arratia (2019).
- A study on fossils of members of the genus Capoeta from the Pliocene locality Çevirme (Turkey) and on the evolutionary history of this genus is published by Ayvazyan, Vasilyan & Böhme (2019).
- Evidence of presence of managed aquaculture of the common carp by around 6000 BC is reported from the Early Neolithic Jiahu site (China) by Nakajima et al. (2019).
- A study on the morphology of fossil catfish spines from the Upper Cretaceous Adamantina and Marilia formations (Brazil) is published by Alves, Bergqvist & Brito (2019).
- A study on positions, heading directions and possible behavioural rules used in a group of fossil specimens of Erismatopterus levatus from the Eocene Green River Formation is published by Mizumoto, Miyata & Pratt (2019).
- Description of gadiform fossils from the Eocene sediments of the Sverdlovsk and Tyumen regions (Ural and Western Siberia, Russia), including fossils of members of the family Merlucciidae, is published by Marramà et al. (2019).
- Description of an incomplete percomorph specimen from the Miocene Ixtapa Formation (Mexico), representing the oldest primary freshwater percomorph fish from Mexico reported so far, is published by Cantalice & Alvarado-Ortega (2019).
- A study on the evolutionary history of the fish clade Pelagiaria is published by Friedman et al. (2019).
- A revision of the nomenclature of extant and fossil barracudas is published by Ballen (2019).
- A review of the published fossil record of the family Labridae is published by Bellwood et al. (2019).
- A study on the feeding habits of the percomorph fish Rhenanoperca minuta and other fishes from the Eocene Messel pit (Germany) is published by Micklich, Baranov & Wappler (2019).
- A study on the phylogenetic relationships of "psarolepid" bony fishes, evaluating which characters cause their different placements in analyses using different methods for reconstructing the tree of life, is published by King (2019).
- A study on the ontogeny of the neurocranium and brain in the West Indian Ocean coelacanth, and on its implications for the knowledge of the evolution of the head of lobe-finned fishes, is published by Dutel et al. (2019).
- Redescription of Axelrodichthys araripensis and a comparative study of several other members of Mawsoniidae is published by Fragoso, Brito & Yabumoto (2019), who transfer the species Mawsonia lavocati to the genus Axelrodichthys.
- A study on the phylogenetic relationships and evolutionary history of mawsoniid coelacanths is published by Cavin et al. (2019).
- A study on the skull anatomy of Arquatichthys porosus, focusing on a newly-discovered postparietal shield, is published by Lu & Zhu (2019).
- Description of the posterior part of the skull of Tungsenia paradoxa is published by Lu et al. (2019).
- New fossil material of "Holoptychius" radiatus Newberry (1889) from the Devonian (Famennian) Catskill Formation (Pennsylvania, United States), providing new information on the anatomy of this species, is described by Daeschler, Downs & Matzko (2019), who transfer this species to the tristichopterid genus Langlieria.
- A study on the bone histology of the humerus of Hyneria lindae is published by Kamska et al. (2019).
- Description of new fossil material of Edenopteron from the Devonian (Famennian) Worange Point Formation (Australia) and a study on the phylogenetic relationships of this taxon is published online by Young et al. (2019).
- A study on the anatomy of the shoulder girdle and opercular series of Gogonasus andrewsae is published by Hu, Young & Lu (2019).
- A historical review of the fossil record of Devonian tetrapods and basal tetrapodomorphs from East Gondwana (Australasia, Antarctica) is published by Long, Clement & Choo (2019), who also present preliminary findings on the anatomy of the canowindrid Koharalepis jarviki based on synchrotron scan data.
- A study on the anatomy of fossil coelacanth lungs, on accessory air-breathing structures in fossil fishes and stem-tetrapods, and on the evolution of air breathing is published by Cupello, Clément & Brito (2019).
- A study on patterns of tooth replacement in Onychodus jandemarrai, Eusthenopteron foordi, Tiktaalik roseae and in extant West Indian Ocean coelacanth is published by Doeland et al. (2019).
- A study on changes of the skeletal anatomy of the pelvic and pectoral appendages during the transition from fins to limbs in vertebrate evolution, as indicated by data from fossil lobe-finned fishes and early tetrapods, is published by Esteve-Altava et al. (2019).
- A study on the anatomy of dermal rays in pectoral fins of Sauripterus taylori, Eusthenopteron foordi and Tiktaalik roseae, evaluating its implications for the knowledge of the evolution of dermal rays in early members of Tetrapodomorpha prior to the origin of digits, is published online by Stewart et al. (2019).
- A study on the evolution of the branchiostegal ray series in the skull of bony fishes, as indicated by data from extant and fossil taxa, is published by Ascarrunz et al. (2019).
- A study on the origin and evolution of acellular bone (bone without osteocytes) in fossil and extant actinopterygian fishes is published by Davesne et al. (2019).
- A diverse fish assemblage is reported from the Carboniferous (upper Pennsylvanian) Horquilla Formation (New Mexico, United States) by Ivanov & Lucas (2019).
- A study on the diversity and ecology of Triassic fish assemblages from the Villány Hills (Hungary) is published by Szabó, Botfalvai & Osi (2019).
- Cretaceous (probably Barremian–Aptian) fish fossils with strong affinities with Early Cretaceous faunas of Thailand are described from Pahang (Malaysia) by Teng et al. (2019).
- Description of a freshwater fish assemblage from the Cretaceous (Albian-Cenomanian) Açu Formation (Brazil) is published by Veiga, Bergqvist & Brito (2019).
- Description of Eocene (Bartonian) fish fauna from the Luna de Sus locality (Romania) is published by Trif, Codrea & Arghiuș (2019).
- A study on the composition of the otolith assemblage from the Santa Barbara Basin near the coast of California over the preceding two millennia is published by Jones & Checkley (2019).
- A study on the evolution of the herbivorous coral reef fishes, as indicated by data from extant and fossil species, is published by Siqueira, Bellwood & Cowman (2019).
