= Miller Mountain =

Miller Mountain may refer to:

- Miller Mountain (Alabama)
- Miller Mountain (Carroll County, Arkansas)
- Miller Mountain (Stone County, Arkansas)
- Miller Mountain (Washington County, Arkansas)
- Miller Mountain (Mohave County, Arizona)
- Miller Mountain (Washington County, Arizona)
- Miller Mountain (Monterey County, California)
- Miller Mountain (San Diego County, California)
- Miller Mountain (Shasta County, California)
- Miller Mountain (Siskiyou County, California)
- Miller Mountain (Colorado)
- Miller Mountain (Idaho)
- Miller Mountain (Nevada) in the Candelaria Hills
- Miller Mountain (Maine)
- Miller Mountain in Mineral County, Montana
- Miller Mountain (Park County, Montana)
- Miller Mountain (Blair County, Pennsylvania)
- Miller Mountain (Wyoming County, Pennsylvania)
