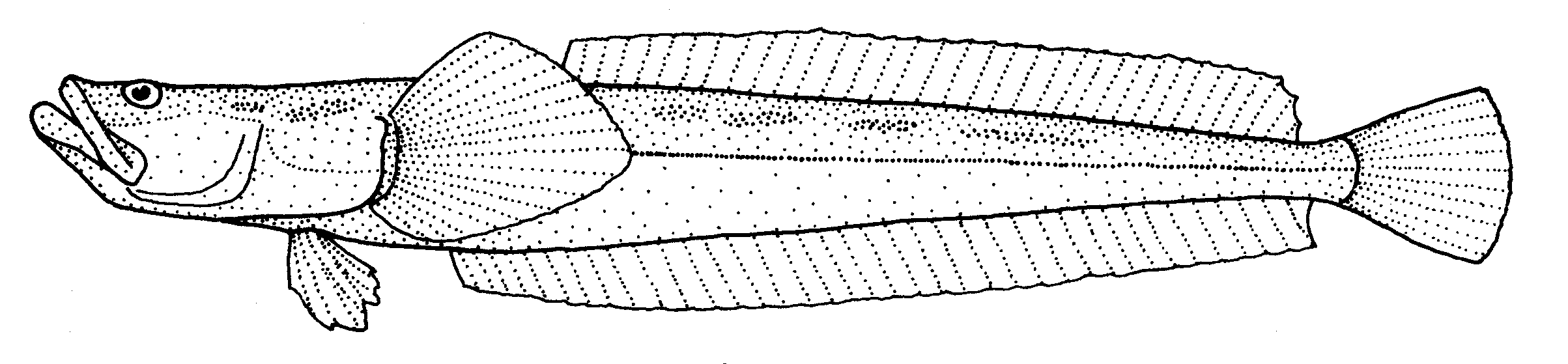

Scientific classification
- Kingdom: Animalia
- Phylum: Chordata
- Class: Actinopterygii
- Division: Teleostei
- Order: Labriformes
- Family: Leptoscopidae
- Genus: Crapatalus
- Species: C. novaezelandiae

Binomial name
- Crapatalus novaezelandiae Günther, 1861

= New Zealand sand stargazer =

Species of ray-finned fish

The New Zealand sand stargazer (Crapatalus novaezelandiae) is a species of southern sandfish endemic to the Pacific waters around New Zealand. From North Cape to Otago Harbour, it occurs in shallow sandy areas generally less than 10m depth, particularly harbours and estuaries. Its length is up to 45 cm.

The body is light to brownish coloured above, with a speckled pattern, the underside is white. The eyes are on top of its head, close together, about the width of the eye apart. Scales above its lateral line are large and in diagonal rows of 7-9 scales.

The head is broad, and flattened dorsally, with a very short snout. It has a large mouth positioned almost vertically with rows of bristle-like teeth on both jaws, with those on the upper jaw not noticeably longer.

The diet of the New Zealand sand stargazer comprises fishes and crabs.

Spawning occurs in winter and early spring.
