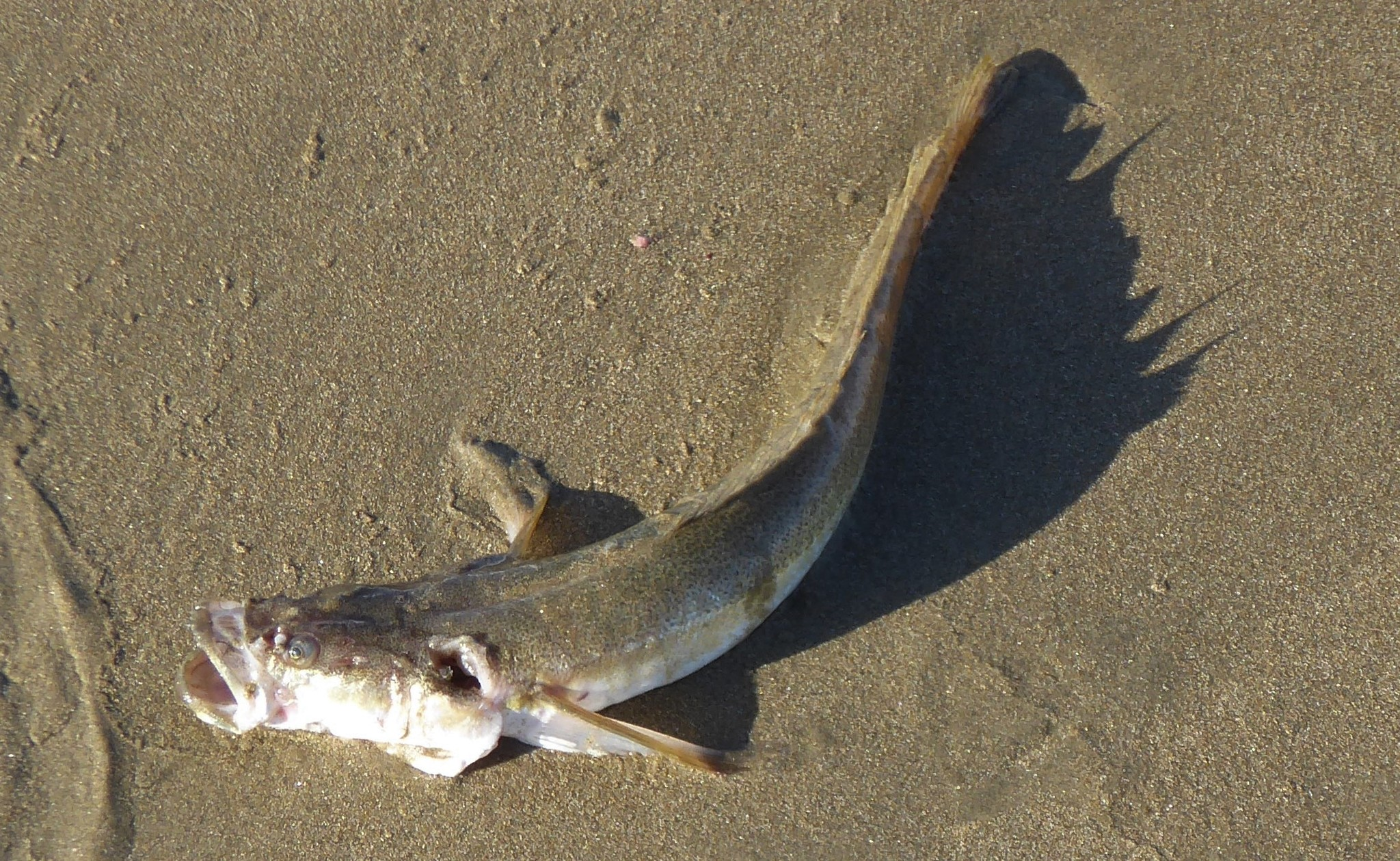

Scientific classification
- Kingdom: Animalia
- Phylum: Chordata
- Class: Actinopterygii
- Division: Teleostei
- Order: Labriformes
- Family: Leptoscopidae
- Genus: Crapatalus
- Species: C. angusticeps

Binomial name
- Crapatalus angusticeps (F. W. Hutton, 1874)

Synonyms
- Leptoscopus angusticeps F. W. Hutton, 1874

= Slender stargazer =

Species of ray-finned fish

Crapatalus angusticeps, commonly known as the slender stargazer, is a species of southern sandfish endemic to the Pacific waters around New Zealand. It can be found at depths between a few and 60 m.

The species was originally described by F.W. Hutton from a specimen caught by a "Dr. Hector" in Greymouth in 1873. The type specimens are presumed lost.

== Description ==
The original description states:

Length nearly 4½ times that of the head or 8¼ times the height of the body; breadth of the head three fifths of its length; interorbital space less than twice the diameter of the eye ; pectorals shorter than the head. Head not cuirassed and without any ridges, covered with skin. Eyes on the upper angles of the head, hardly vertical. Teeth in villiform bands on both jaws, and a few on the palatine bones; vomer apparently, smooth. Upl?er and lower lips with villi. Pale olivaceous grey above, with numerous small dark grey spots which are closer together on the top of the head; below white ; a band of silvery from the chin, through the opercles, along the sides below the lateral line to the caudal Total length 13 inches. Lateral line continuous. No humeral spine.
