= Candelaria Formation =

Candelaria Formation may refer to:

- Candelaria Formation, Nevada, Early Triassic geologic formation of Nevada
- Candelaria Formation, Argentina, Cambro-Ordovician geologic formation of Argentina
- Candelaria Formation, Colombia, Paleogene geologic formation of Colombia
- Candelária Formation, Amazon Basin, Quaternary geologic formation of Amazonian Brazil and Bolivia
- Candelária Formation, Paraná Basin, Late Triassic geologic formation of the Paraná Basin, Brazil
