= Crapatalus munroi =

Scientific classification
- Kingdom: Animalia
- Phylum: Chordata
- Class: Actinopterygii
- Order: Labriformes
- Family: Leptoscopidae
- Genus: Crapatalus
- Species: C. munroi

Binomial name
- Crapatalus munroi Last & Edgar, 1987

Species of ray-finned fish

Crapatalus munroi, the robust pygmy stargazer or Munro's Pygmy-stargazer, is a species of demersal marine ray-finned fish from the family Leptoscopidae. It is found in southern Australia from the Gippsland Lakes in Victoria to the Great Australian Bight in South Australia and south to the D'Entrecasteaux Channel in Tasmania. It occurs in shallow water over pale coloured sand, where it buries itself in the substrate. The specific name honours the Australian ichthyologist Ian Stafford Ross Munro who discovered the species.
