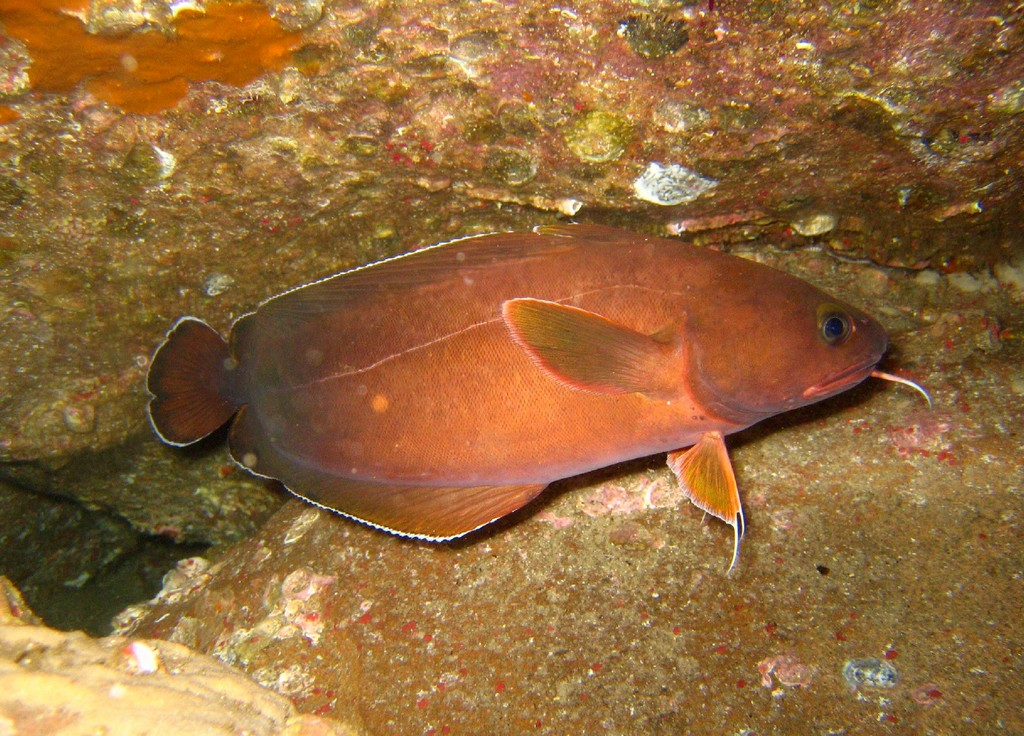

Scientific classification
- Kingdom: Animalia
- Phylum: Chordata
- Class: Actinopterygii
- Division: Teleostei
- Order: Gadiformes
- Family: Moridae
- Genus: Lotella
- Species: L. rhacina

Binomial name
- Lotella rhacina (J. R. Forster, 1801)

Synonyms
- Gadus rhacinus Forster, 1801; Lotella fuliginosa Günther, 1862; Lotella callarias Günther, 1863; Lotella marginata Macleay, 1881; Lotella swanii Johnston, 1883; Lotella limbata Ogilby, 1886; Lotella macleayi Rendahl, 1921

= Rock cod =

Species of fish

The rock cod (Lotella rhacina) is a temperate fish found off the coasts of southeastern Australia, Tasmania, the Great Australian Bight and northwards up the southwestern Australia coasts. They are also found around the coasts of New Zealand and California. They belong to the family Moridae and are not related to the true cods (genus Gadus). They are also known as beardie in Australia.

Rock cod are yellow-grey to red-brown with white fin margins. They have chin barbels. They may grow up to 50 cm in length. They are found in caves in bays and coastal reefs. They are frequently found inshore and inhabit shallow waters in the continental shelf with typical depth of 10 to 90 m.

Many other fish species are sometimes called 'rock cod', but most are unrelated to the cod family, and are better known as groupers.
