= Lesueurina =

Scientific classification
- Kingdom: Animalia
- Phylum: Chordata
- Class: Actinopterygii
- Division: Teleostei
- Order: Labriformes
- Family: Leptoscopidae
- Genus: Lesueurina; Fowler, 1908
- Species: L. platycephala

Binomial name
- Lesueurina platycephala Fowler, 1908

Synonyms
- Crapatalus arenarius McCulloch, 1915

Species of ray-finned fish

Lesueurina platycephala, the flathead pygmy-stargazer, is a species of southern sandfish endemic to the coastal waters of southern Australia. It occurs in areas with a sandy substrate and turbulent waters at depths of from near the surface to 1 metre (3.3 ft). This species grows to a length of 11 centimetres (4.3 in) SL. This species is the only known member of its genus. It is an ambush predator which occurs from Fraser Island in Queensland south along the Australian coast, including Tasmania, and west to Coral Bay, Western Australia. The generic name honours the French artist and naturalist Charles Alexandre Lesueur (1778-1846) who visited Australia on the vessels Géographe and Naturaliste under the leadership of Nicolas Baudin (1880-1804) and who later worked as an ichthyologist in the Academy of Natural Sciences of Philadelphia.
