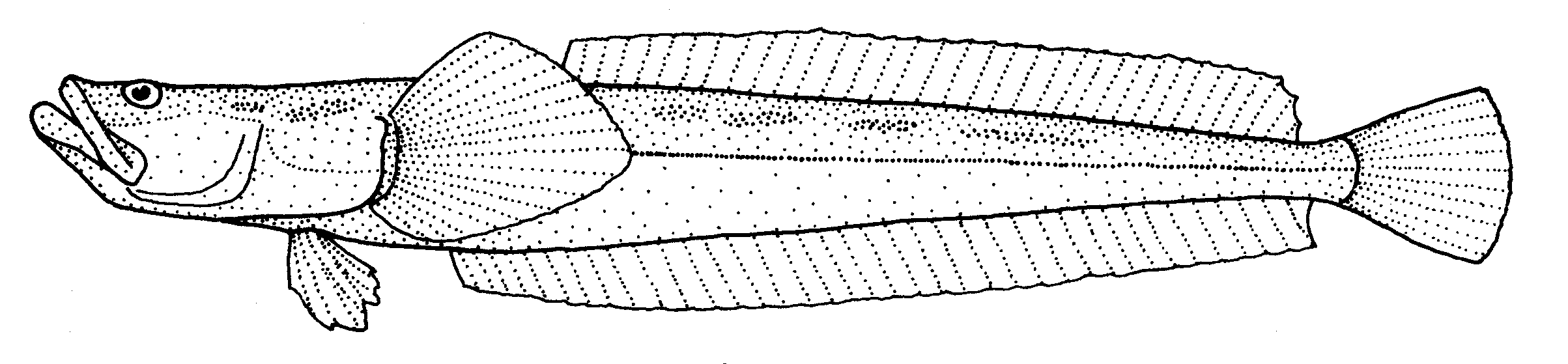
- C. novaezelandiae

Scientific classification
- Domain: Eukaryota
- Kingdom: Animalia
- Phylum: Chordata
- Class: Actinopterygii
- Order: Labriformes
- Family: Leptoscopidae
- Genus: Crapatalus; Günther, 1861

Type species
- Crapatalus novaezelandiae Günther, 1861

= Crapatalus =

Genus of ray-finned fishes

Crapatalus is a genus of southern sandfishes native to the coastal waters of Australia and New Zealand.

== Species ==
There are currently three recognized species in this genus:

- Crapatalus angusticeps (F. W. Hutton, 1874) (Slender stargazer)
- Crapatalus munroi Last & Edgar, 1987 (Robust pygmy-stargazer)
- Crapatalus novaezelandiae Günther, 1861
