= Dainichi Formation =

Geological formation in Shizuoka, Japan

The Dainichi Formation is a palaeontological formation located in Shizuoka, Japan. The formation is part of the Kakegawa Group. It dates to the Upper Pliocene period. The shell beds in the Dainichi formation contain molluscan fossils, including those of the Rhizoconus hyaena.

== See also ==
- List of fossil sites
