= Candelaria Formation, Nevada =

Geologic formation in Nevada, United States

Candelaria Formation
- Stratigraphic range: Induan
- Type: Formation

Lithology
- Primary: Shale
- Other: Limestone

Location
- Coordinates: 38.1°N 118.1°W
- Approximate paleocoordinates: 12.1°N 41.6°W
- Region: Nevada
- Country: United States

Type section
- Named for: Candelaria Hills
- Candelaria Formation, Nevada (the United States) Candelaria Formation, Nevada (Nevada)

The Candelaria Formation is a geologic formation in Nevada, United States. The formation comprises shales and limestones deposited in an open marine environment and preserves fossils dating back to the Induan (Griesbachian to Dienerian) age of the Early Triassic epoch. Outcrops of the Candelaria Formation are present in the Candelaria Hills southeast of the now abandoned mining town of Candelaria (Mineral and Esmeralda counties), and near Willow Springs (Nye County).

== Fossil content ==
=== Invertebrates ===
Among the invertebrates, fossils of the following species of ammonoids, nautiloids, and bivalves have been recovered from the formation:

- Ambites lilangensis
- Ambites aff. radiatus
- Claraia aurita, C. clarai, C. stachei
- Clypites cf. evolvens
- Grypoceras cf. brahmanicum'
- Meekoceras cf. tenuistriatum
- Microconchus sp.
- Mullericeras fergusoni, M. spitiense
- Parahedenstroemia kiparisovae
- Proptychites haydeni, P. pagei
- Proptychites cf. ammonoides, P. cf. trilobatus
- Radioceras kraffti
- Ussuridiscus sp.
- Vavilovites sp.

=== Vertebrates ===
Among the vertebrates, fossils of the following species of ray-finned fishes have been collected from the formation:

- Ardoreosomus occidentalis
- Candelarialepis argentus
- ?Gyrolepis sp.
- Pteronisculus nevadanus

== See also ==
- List of fossiliferous stratigraphic units in Nevada
- Paleontology in Nevada
