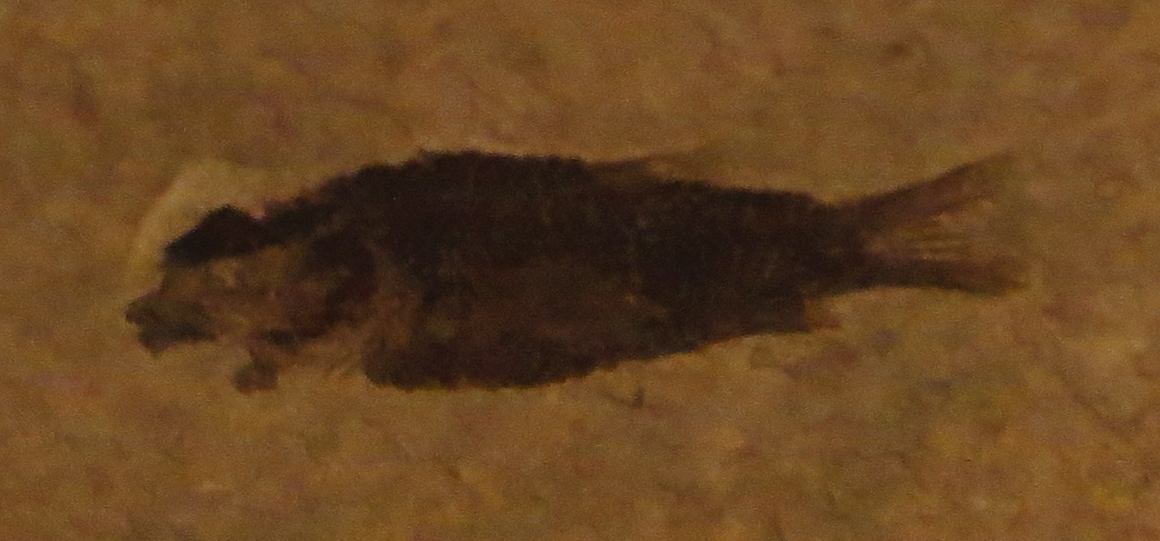
- Eosemionotus sp. fossil

Scientific classification
- Kingdom: Animalia
- Phylum: Chordata
- Class: Actinopterygii
- Clade: Ginglymodi
- Order: †Semionotiformes
- Family: †Macrosemiidae
- Genus: †Eosemionotus; Stolley, 1919

Type species
- †Allolepidotus vogeli von Fritsch, 1906

Species
- See text

= Eosemionotus =

Eosemionotus Temporal range: Anisian to Ladinian

Extinct genus of fishes

Eosemionotus ("dawn Semionotus") is an extinct genus of prehistoric marine macrosemiid ray-finned fish from the Middle Triassic (Anisian to Ladinian). It was a speciose genus known from throughout Europe, including formations of the Muschelkalk.

The following species are known:

- E. ceresiensis Bürgin, 2004 - early Ladinian of Italy (Besano Formation)
- E. diskosomus López-Arbarello et al., 2019 - early Ladinian of Italy (Meride Formation) and Switzerland (Cassina Formation)
- E. minutus López-Arbarello et al., 2019 - early Ladinian of Italy (Meride Formation)
- E. ratumensis Diependaal et al. 2024 - mid-late Anisian of the Netherlands (Vossenveld Formation)
- E. sceltrichensis López-Arbarello et al., 2019 - Ladinian of Switzerland (Meride Formation)
- E. vogeli (von Fritsch, 1906) - late Anisian of Germany (Heilbronn Formation) (=Allolepidotus vogeli von Fritsch, 1906)

In addition, indeterminate remains of Eosemionotus are known from Spain, Slovenia, and China.

The Tethys Ocean appears to have been the center of diversification for the genus. The species E. vogeli appears to descend from a population that dispersed from the Tethys into the Germanic Basin prior to the late Anisian.

== See also ==
- Prehistoric fish
- List of prehistoric bony fish
