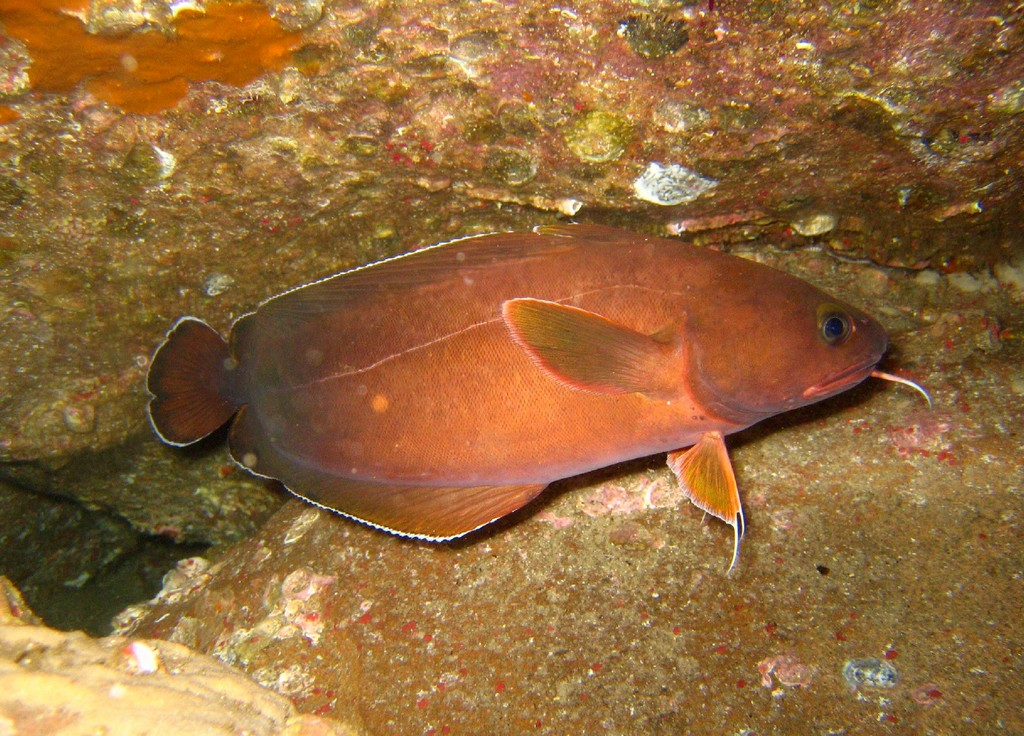
- Rock cod (L. rhacina)

Scientific classification
- Kingdom: Animalia
- Phylum: Chordata
- Class: Actinopterygii
- Order: Gadiformes
- Family: Moridae
- Genus: Lotella; Kaup, 1858

Type species
- Lotella schlegeli as a synonym of Lota phycis Kaup, 1858

= Lotella =

Genus of fishes

Lotella is a genus of morid cods.

== Species ==
The currently recognized species in this genus are:

- Lotella fernandeziana Rendahl (de), 1921 (bronze beardie)
- Lotella phycis (Temminck & Schlegel, 1846) (beardie)
- Lotella rhacina (J. R. Forster, 1801) (rock cod)
- Lotella tosaensis (Kamohara, 1936)

Synonyms

- Lotella schuettei Steindachner, 1866 (slender beardie); valid as L. phycis
