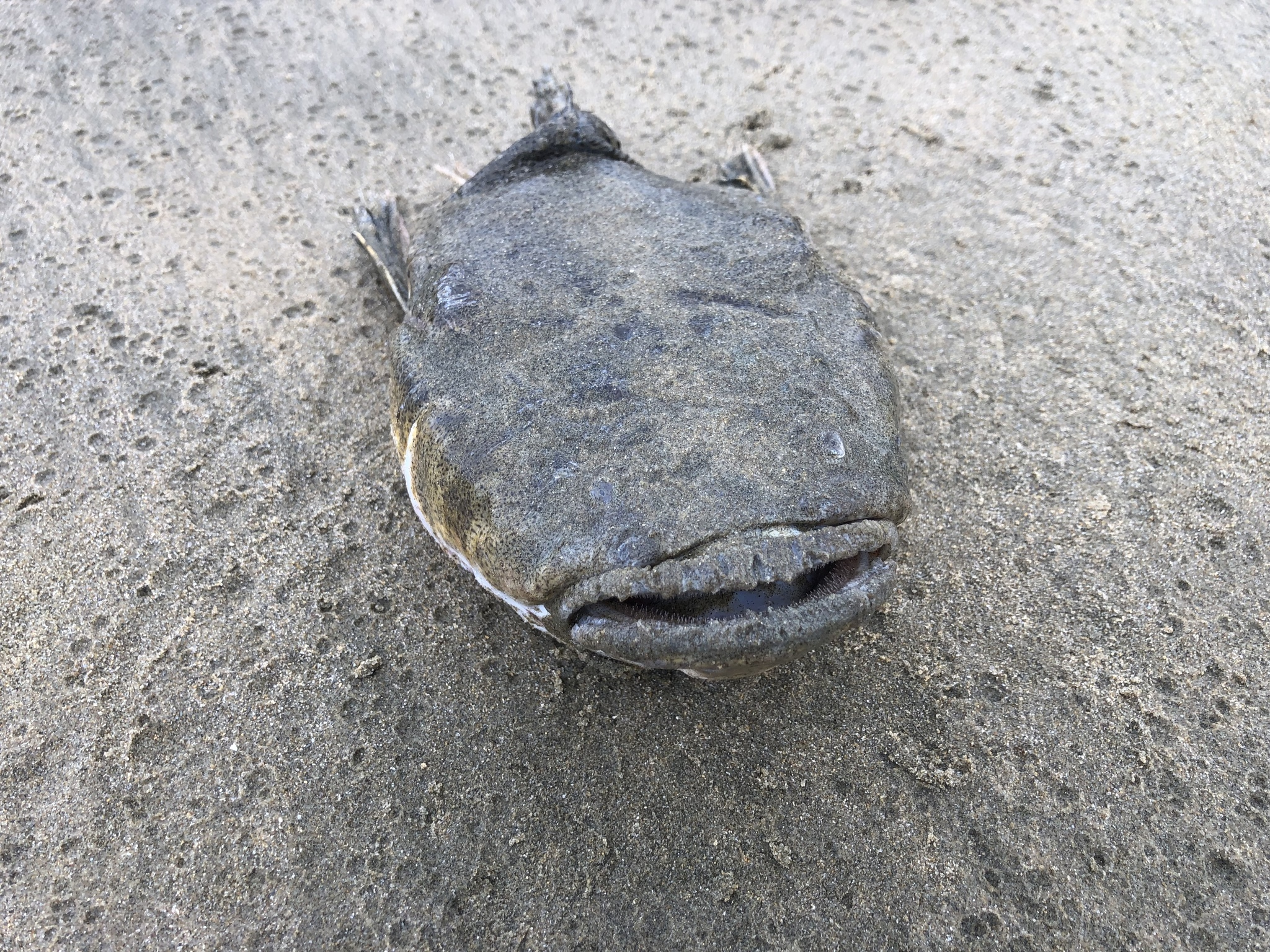

Scientific classification
- Kingdom: Animalia
- Phylum: Chordata
- Class: Actinopterygii
- Order: Labriformes
- Family: Leptoscopidae
- Genus: Leptoscopus; T. N. Gill, 1859
- Species: L. macropygus

Binomial name
- Leptoscopus macropygus (J. Richardson, 1846)

Synonyms
- Uranoscopus macropygus J. Richardson, 1846

= Estuary stargazer =

Species of ray-finned fish

Leptoscopus macropygus, commonly known as the estuary stargazer, is a species of southern sandfish endemic to the Pacific waters around New Zealand. It occurs at depths between a few and 60 m. This species can reach a length of 17 centimetres (6.7 in) FL. It is currently the only known member of its genus.
