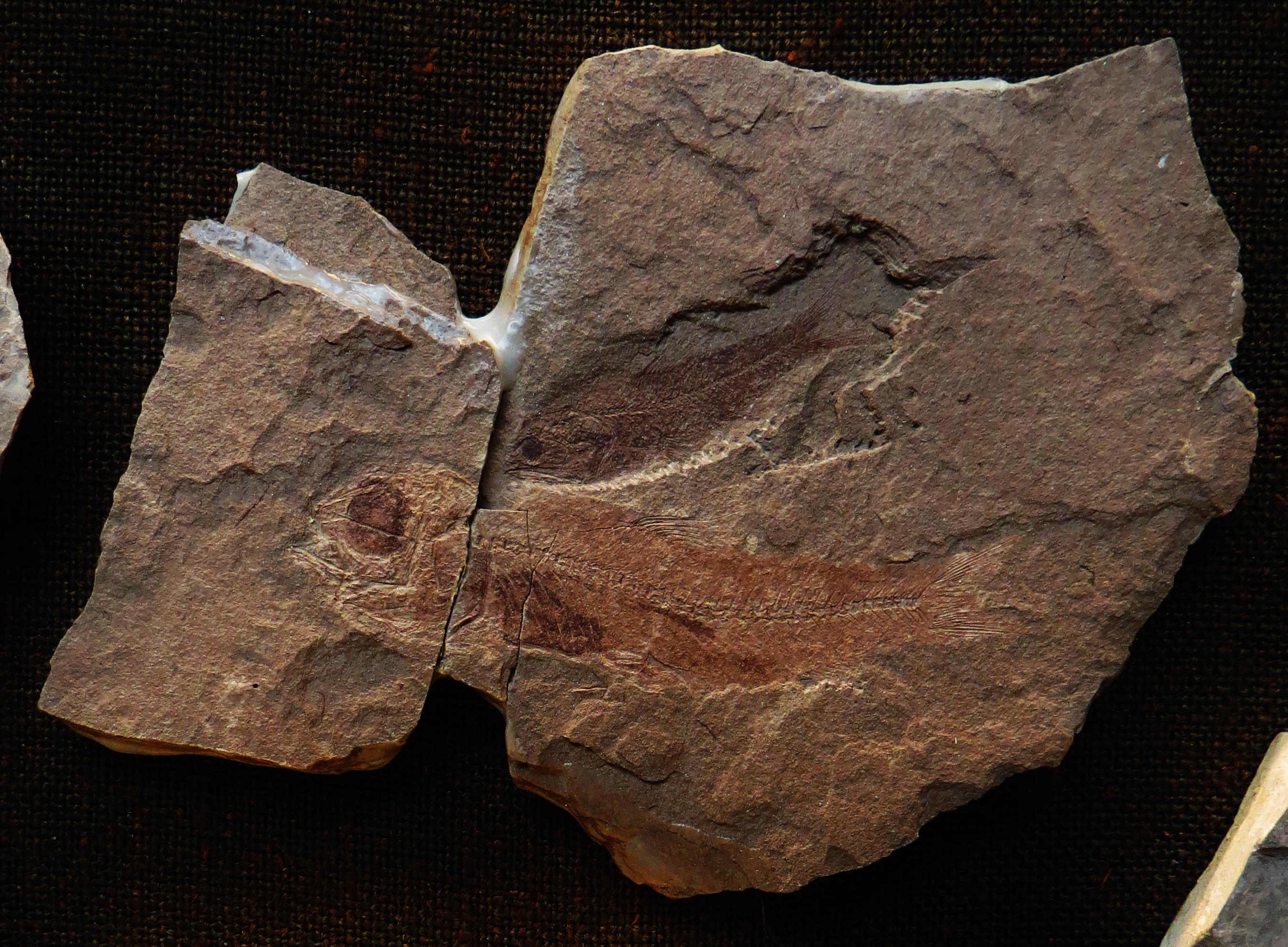
- Fossil specimen of E. cozlae (bottom) with Sarmatella (top) from Romania
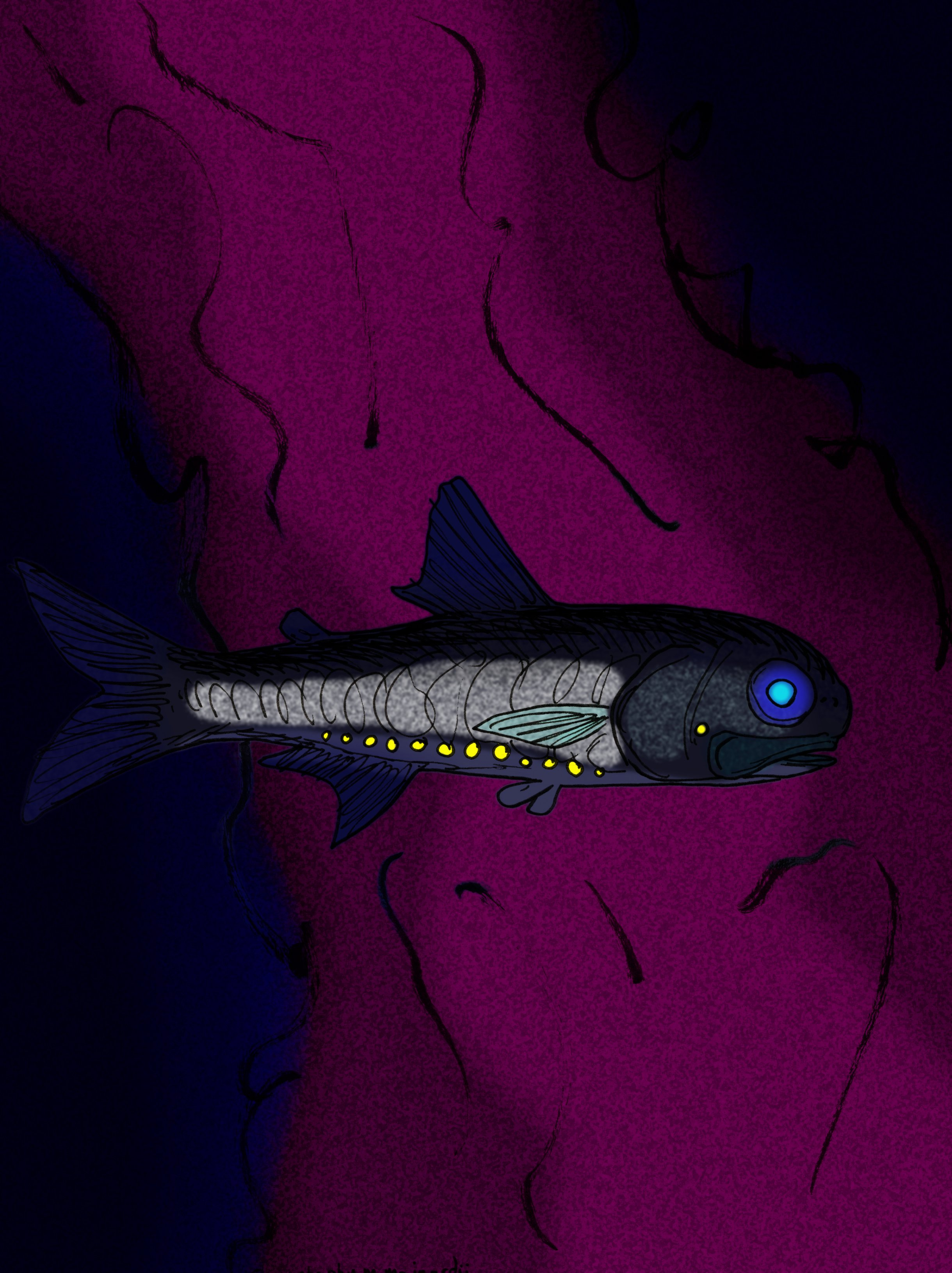
- Artistic reconstruction of Eomyctophum mainardii

Scientific classification
- Kingdom: Animalia
- Phylum: Chordata
- Class: Actinopterygii
- Division: Teleostei
- Order: Myctophiformes
- Family: Myctophidae
- Subfamily: †Eomyctophinae
- Genus: †Eomyctophum; Daniltshenko, 1947

Type species
- †Eomyctophum koraensis Daniltshenko, 1947

Species
- E. cozlae Ciobanu, 1977; E. koraensis Daniltshenko, 1947; E. mainardii Calzoni, Giusberti & Carnevale, 2025; E. polysarcum (Gorjanovic-Kramberger, 1880)

= Eomyctophum =

Eomyctophum Temporal range: Early Eocene to Early Oligocene

Extinct genus of fishes

Eomyctophum ("dawn Myctophum") is an extinct genus of lanternfish that inhabited the Peri-Tethys region and later the Paratethys Sea from the Eocene to the Oligocene. Its remains are known from throughout eastern Europe & western Asia in both the Caucasus and Carpathians. Fossils of this genus comprises both articulated skeletons and otoliths suggesting it was a particularly common genus of fish.

It is the only member of the extinct subfamily Eomyctophinae, although Eokrefftia may also belong in it. The earliest known member of the genus was identified from the Early Eocene of Italy in 2025, millions of years earlier and further west than the other species.

== Taxonomy ==
The following species are known:

- †E. cozlae Ciobanu, 1977 - Early Oligocene of Romania
- †E. koraensis Daniltshenko, 1947 (type species) - Early Oligocene of the North Caucasus, Russia (including Pshekha Formation), Abkhazia, Azerbaijan, and Ukraine (Menilitic Formation) (=E. menneri Daniltshenko, 1967)
- †E. mainardii Calzoni, Giusberti & Carnevale, 2025 - Early Eocene of Italy (Chiusole Formation)
- †E. polysarcum (Gorjanovic-Kramberger, 1880) - Early Oligocene of the Czech Republic

The former species E. gracilis and E. limicolus are now placed in the blackchin Beckerophotus and the lanternfish Oligophus respectively.
