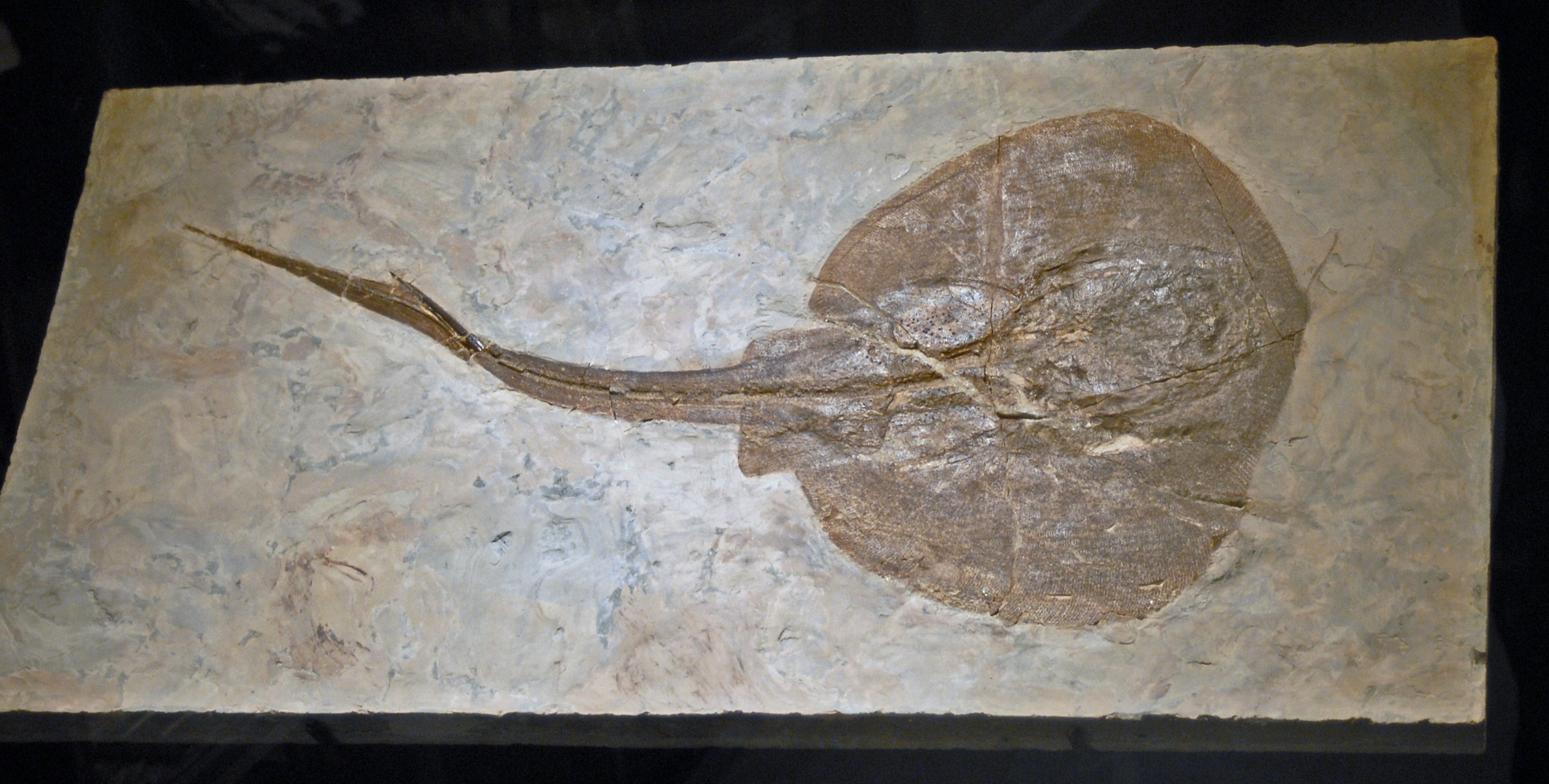
- Fossil of Tethytrygon from Monte Bolca, 50 million years ago, on display at the Museo Civico di Storia Naturale di Milano

Scientific classification
- Kingdom: Animalia
- Phylum: Chordata
- Class: Chondrichthyes
- Subclass: Elasmobranchii
- Order: Myliobatiformes
- Family: Dasyatidae
- Genus: †Tethytrygon; Marramà, G., G. Carnevale, G. J. P. Naylor, and J. Kriwet, 2018
- Species: †T. muricata

Binomial name
- †Tethytrygon muricata (Volta, 1796)

Synonyms
- Dasyatis muricata; Dasyatis gazzolae; Dasyatis knerii; Taeniura knerii; Trygon gazzolae; Trygon muricata; Trygon muricatus; Trygon (Taeniura) muricatus; Trygonobatus vulgaris

= Tethytrygon =

Tethytrygon Temporal range: 55.8–48.6 Ma Eocene

Extinct genus of cartilaginous fishes

Tethytrygon is an extinct genus of stingray in the family Dasyatidae.
