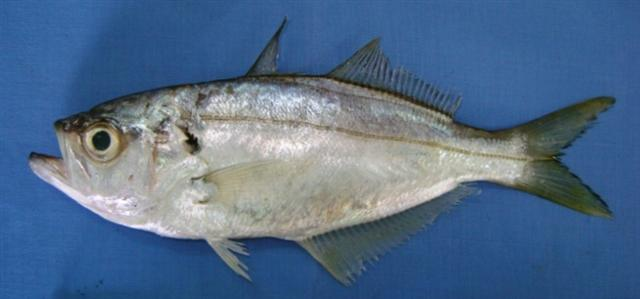
- Lactarius lactarius

Scientific classification
- Kingdom: Animalia
- Phylum: Chordata
- Class: Actinopterygii
- Order: Carangiformes
- Suborder: Centropomoidei
- Family: Lactariidae; Boulenger, 1904
- Genus: Lactarius; Valenciennes, 1833
- Species: L. lactarius

Binomial name
- Lactarius lactarius (Bloch & J. G. Schneider, 1801)

Synonyms
- Genus: Platylepes Swainson, 1839; Species: Scomber lactarius Bloch & J. G. Schneider, 1801; Lactarius delicatulus Valenciennes, 1833; Lactarius burmanicus Lloyd, 1907

= False trevally =

False trevally Temporal range: Eocene–recent

Species of ray-finned fish

The false trevally (Lactarius lactarius) is a species of carangiform ray-finned fish in the family Lactariidae, currently the sole member of the family.

== Distribution ==
The false trevally is native to the Indian Ocean and from East Africa to Southeast Asia, and in the western Pacific Ocean from Japan to Queensland, Australia. It is a coastal species, occurring in marine and brackish waters at depths of from 15 to 100 m (49 to 328 ft). It is an important species to local commercial fisheries.

== Description ==
This fish is colored silvery-grey on the upper parts with blue iridescence dorsally and a dusky black spot on the upper gill cover. The underparts are colored silvery-white. The fins are pale yellow. This species can reach a length of 40 cm (16 in), though most do not exceed 30 cm (12 in).

== Gallery ==
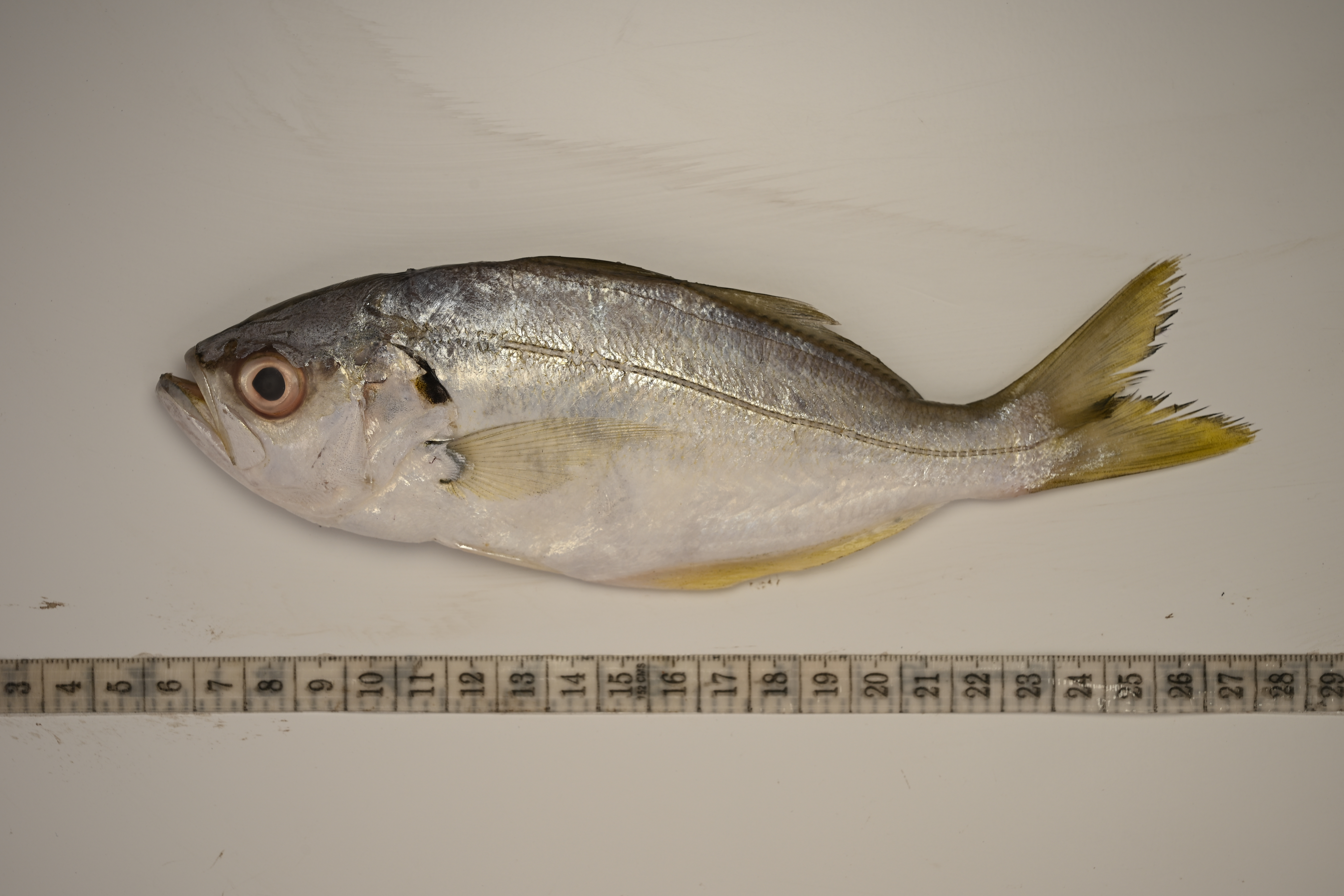
Lactarius lactarius

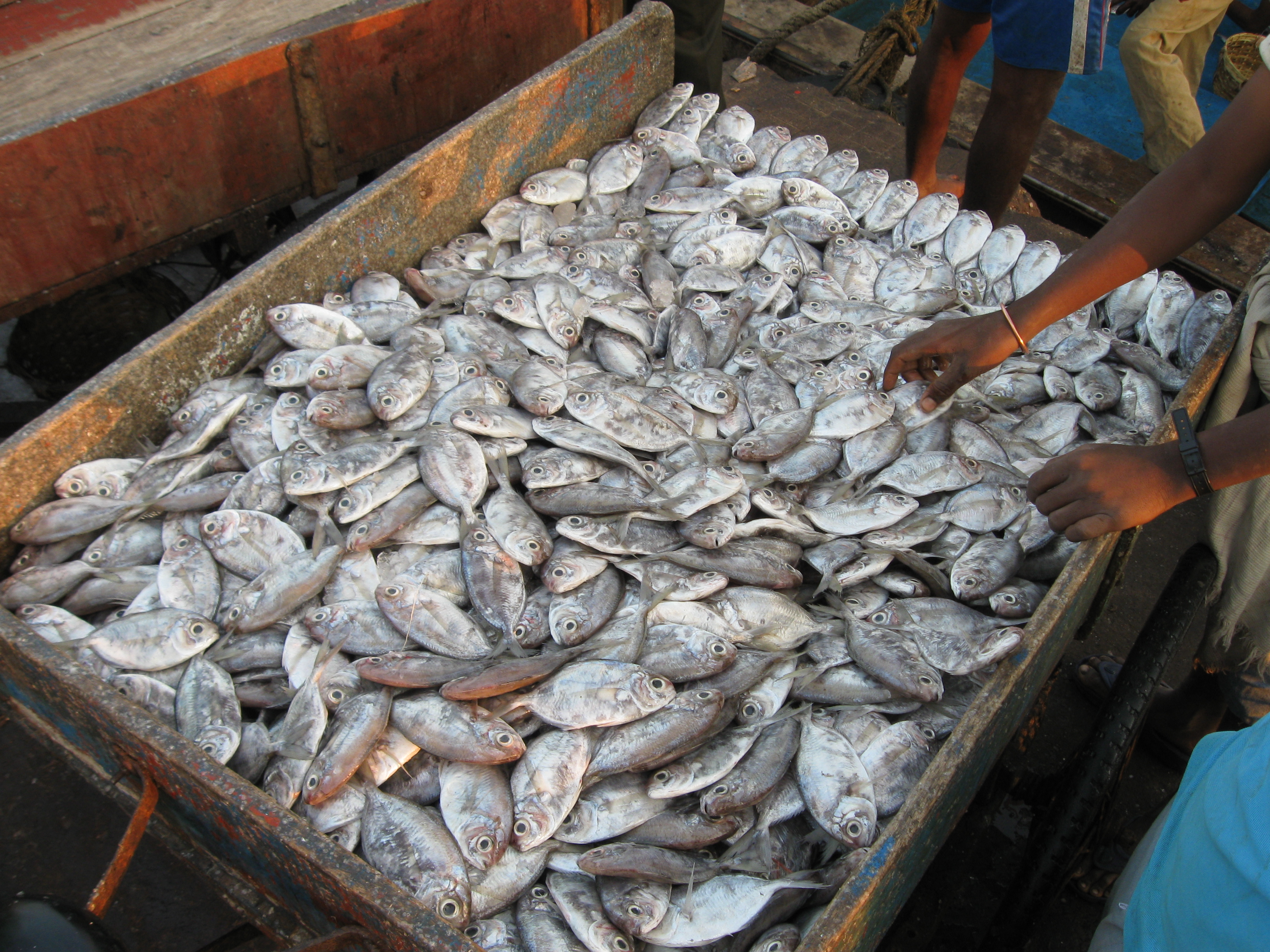
False trevallies in Visakhapatnam Landing Center, Andhra Pradesh, India

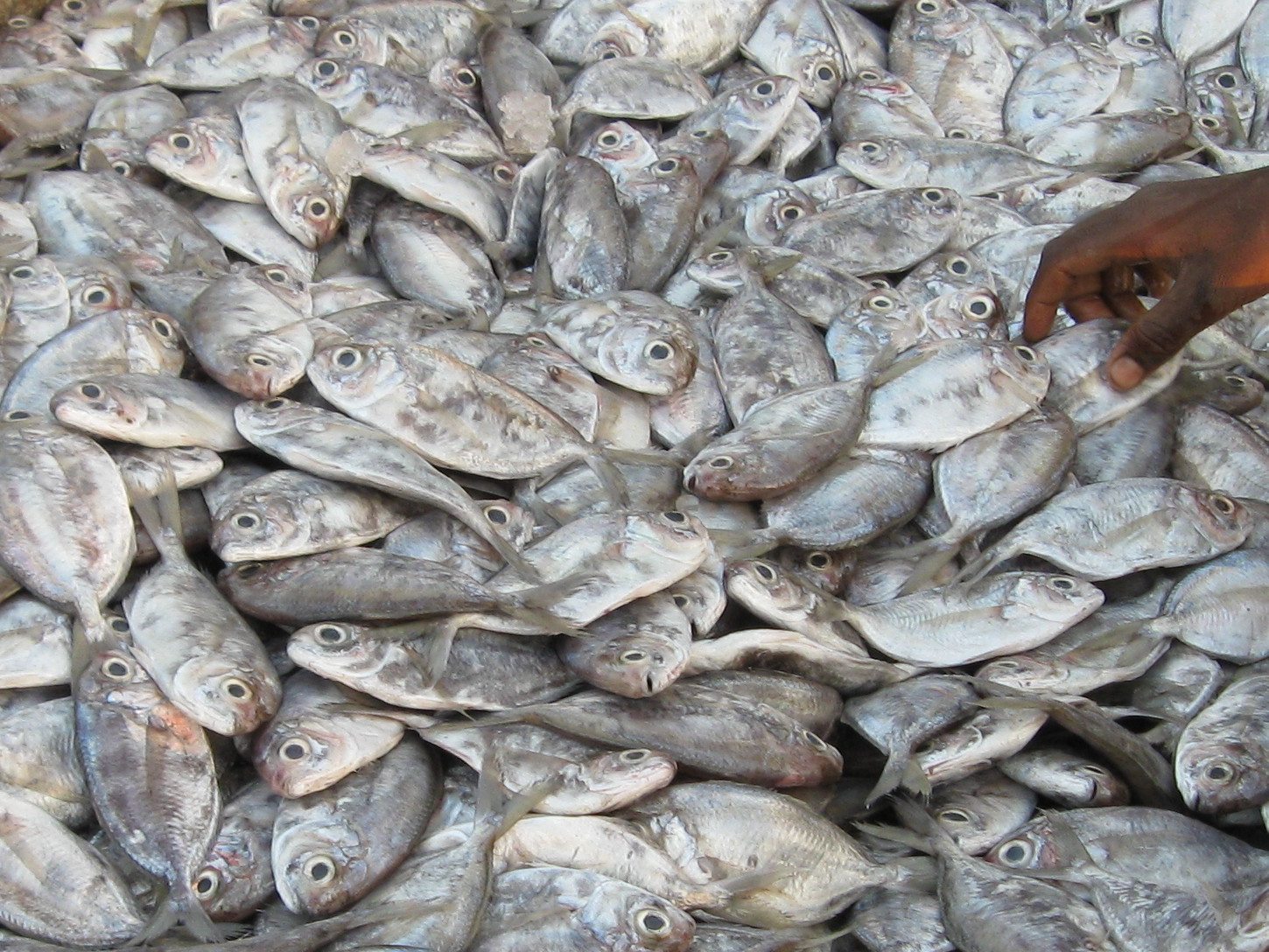
Close-up of False trevallies in Visakhapatnam Landing Center

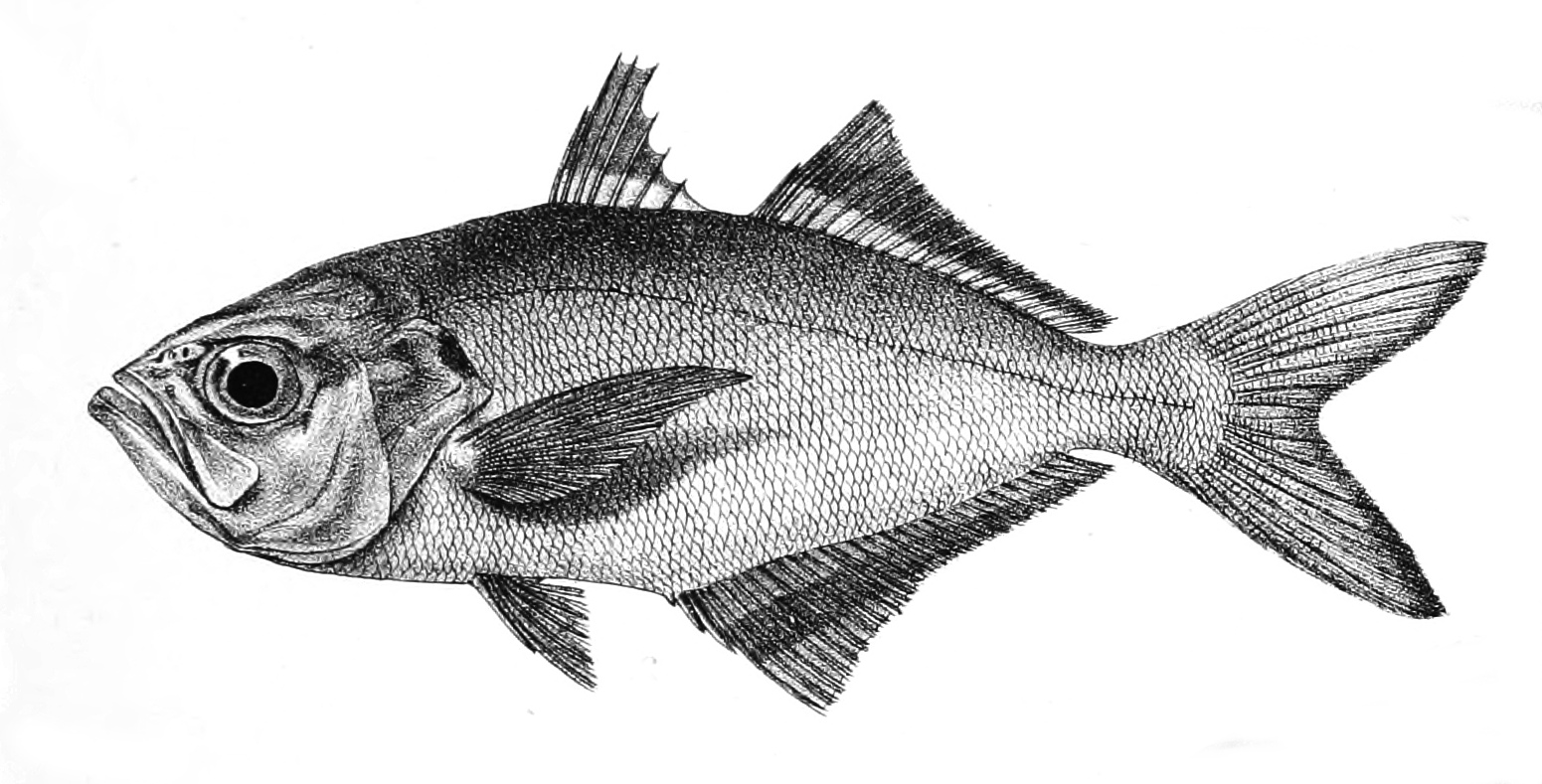
False trevally illustration
