= Protocentrophorus =

Protocentrophorus Temporal range: 99–72 Ma Cenomanian to Campanian

Scientific classification
- Kingdom: Animalia
- Phylum: Chordata
- Class: Chondrichthyes
- Subclass: Elasmobranchii
- Division: Selachii
- Order: Squaliformes
- Family: Squalidae
- Genus: †Protocentrophorus; Adnet et al. 2008

Type species
- †Centrophorus balticus Dalinkevičius, 1935

Other species
- †Protocentrophorus steviae Cappetta et al. 2019

Extinct genus of sharks

Protocentrophorus is a genus of was a genus of dogfish shark that existed during the Cretaceous. Fossils have been found in the Tauragė County of Lithuania and British Columbia in Canada. Known from teeth, they were originally assigned to the genus Centrophorus.

While some classify Protocentrophorus as belonging to the family Squalidae, phylogenetic tests indicate that it might be a member of the Centrophoridae.

== Description ==
This squaloid shark had small teeth that combined traits from two modern shark families, Squalidae and Centrophoridae. The lower teeth were flattened from front to back, as seen in Centrophoridae, and wider than they were tall, like those in Squalidae. The base of the tooth root was flat, long, and almost vertical, similar to Centrophoridae, but it lacked the special hollow for overlapping teeth and the prominent root face typical of Squalidae. The apron, a part of the tooth, was moderately high and didn't extend past the base of the root, while the uvula, a small part of the tooth, was reduced and not prominent. Additionally, there was no infundibulum, a funnel-like structure, present.
