= Miller Mountain (Nevada) =

Mountain in Nevada, United States

- Location within Nevada

Highest point
- Elevation: 8,736 ft (2,663 m) NAVD 88
- Prominence: 2,449 ft (746 m)
- Listing: Ultra prominent peak
- Coordinates: 38°03′54.521″N 118°11′29.155″W

Geography
- Location: Mineral County, Nevada, U.S.
- Parent range: Candelaria Hills
- Topo map: USGS Miller Mountain

Miller Mountain is located in the Candelaria Hills of Mineral County, Nevada. "Borax" Smith's board-and-batten cabin where he lived when he discovered a rich borax deposit at nearby Teel's Marsh was located here.
