= Candelaria Hills =

Mountain range in Nevada, United States

- Location within Nevada

Highest point
- Peak: Miller Mountain
- Elevation: 8,736 ft (2,663 m) NAVD 88
- Listing: Mountain ranges of Nevada
- Coordinates: 38°03′54.521″N 118°11′29.155″W

Geography
- Country: United States
- State: Nevada
- County: Mineral County
- Range coordinates: 38°10′57.74″N 118°5′32.41″W
- Borders on: Excelsior Mountains NW; Pilot Mountains NE; Monte Cristo Range E; Volcanic Hills S
- Topo map: USGS Candelaria

The Candelaria Hills are a mountain range in Mineral County, Nevada. The highest peak is Miller Mountain which was the location of "Borax" Smith's board-and-batten cabin where he lived when he discovered a rich borax deposit at nearby Teel's Marsh.
