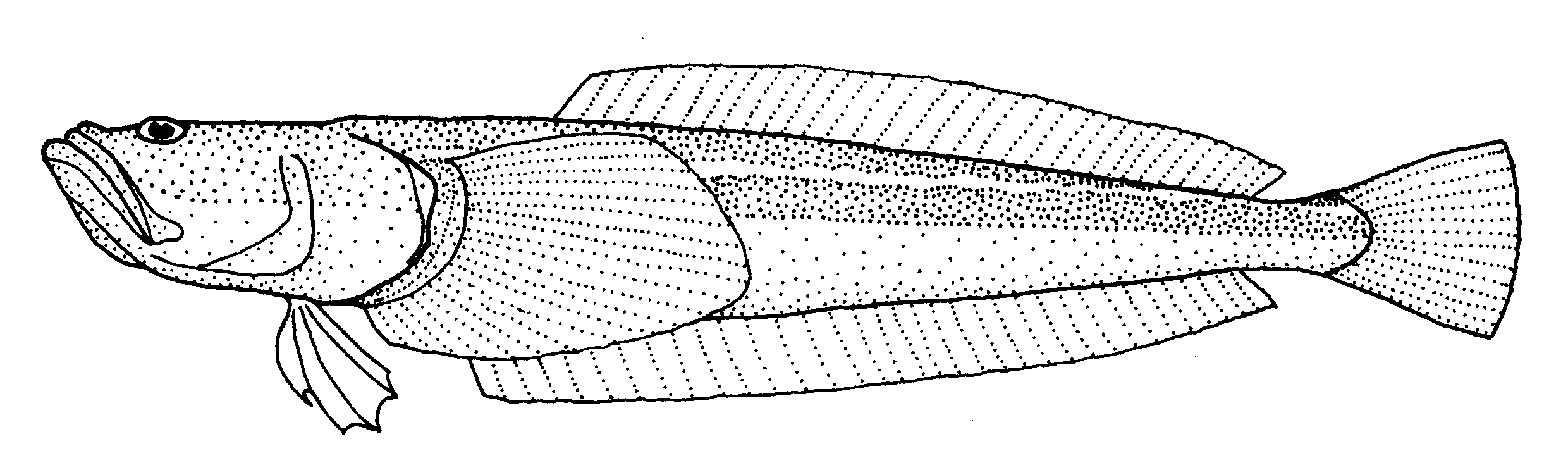
- Estuary stargazer, Leptoscopus macropygus

Scientific classification
- Domain: Eukaryota
- Kingdom: Animalia
- Phylum: Chordata
- Class: Actinopterygii
- Clade: Eupercaria
- Order: Labriformes
- Suborder: Uranoscopoidei
- Family: Leptoscopidae; T. N. Gill, 1859

Genera
- Crapatalus; Leptoscopus; Lesueurina

= Southern sandfish =

Southern sandfishes

Family of ray-finned fishes

The southern sandfishes are a family, Leptoscopidae, of labriform ray-finned fishes inhabiting the Indian and Pacific Ocean coastal waters of Australia and New Zealand.
