= Basil Nafpaktitis =

Greek-American marine biologist and ichthyologist (1929–2015)

Basil G. Nafpaktitis
- Βασίλειος Γεώργιος Ναυπακτίτης
- Born: Basil George Nafpaktitis; 23 December 1929; Athens, Greece
- Died: 24 May 2015 (aged 85); Charlottesville, Virginia, U.S.
- Citizenship: Greek, American
- Education: American University of Beirut; Harvard University
- Known for: Research on lanternfish (Myctophidae)
- Spouse: Mary Kathryn Wieand
- Scientific career
- Fields: Marine biology, ichthyology
- Workplaces: University of Southern California; University of Crete
- Doctoral advisor: Giles W. Mead

Basil George Nafpaktitis (Greek: Βασίλειος Γεώργιος Ναυπακτίτης; 23 December 1929 – 24 May 2015) was a Greek-American marine biologist and ichthyologist. His research focused particularly on the lanternfish family (Myctophidae).

== Biography ==
Nafpaktitis was the son of George and Margarita Nafpaktitis. His father worked as an accountant for Shell Oil Company and spoke several languages. He arranged for Basil and his older brother Nicholas to receive instruction in English from an early age. They also learned to speak Russian from their Ukrainian-born mother and grandmother, who lived with the family. His father died shortly before the outbreak of World War II, leaving the family without a regular income and forcing them to endure the hardships of the Nazi occupation of Athens.

When he was old enough, Nafpaktitis took a series of odd jobs to support his family. He traveled throughout Greece showing advertising films for the United States Department of State, manufactured ammunition for NATO—during which he lost parts of two fingers in a laboratory accident—worked as a foreman in a zinc mine on the island of Thasos, and managed a warehouse at the port of Piraeus.

After seeing an advertisement for the American University of Beirut (AUB) in Lebanon, Nafpaktitis applied for a scholarship to study there. After passing the entrance examination, he completed his bachelor's degree in 1962. In 1963, under the supervision of entomologist Robert E. Lewis, then curator of the natural history museum at the American University of Beirut, he completed his Master of Science degree with a thesis entitled A taxonomic study of the genus Blennius L. of Lebanon.

During his graduate studies in Lebanon, Nafpaktitis met his fellow student Mary Kathryn Wieand in a physiology course; they married in October 1964. In 1963, he was admitted to the doctoral program in biology at Harvard University. Under the strong influence of his doctoral adviser Giles W. Mead, he became interested in deep-sea fishes and quickly concentrated on the taxonomy, distribution, ecology, and functional morphology of lanternfishes (family Myctophidae). He received his Ph.D. in 1967 for his dissertation Taxonomy & distribution of the lanternfishes, genera Lobianchia & Diaphus, in the North Atlantic. He became a U.S. citizen in 1971.

During his active research career, Nafpaktitis described 24 new taxa of lanternfishes. Many were named in honor of people whom he particularly respected and who had helped advance his career, including Erik Bertelsen, Rolf L. Bolin, Anton F. Bruun, Leslie W. Knapp, Giles W. Mead, Jørgen G. Nielsen, Richard B. Roe, and Robert L. Wisner.

In 1966, while still a doctoral student at Harvard, Nafpaktitis was offered a joint position in the Department of Biological Sciences and the Allan Hancock Foundation at the University of Southern California (USC) in Los Angeles, which he accepted. He was a member of the USC faculty for 28 years, serving as assistant professor from 1967 to 1971, associate professor from 1971 to 1979, and professor from 1979 until his retirement.

Nafpaktitis supervised the doctoral research of more than 20 graduate students. He received the USC Biology Students Association Award for Outstanding Teaching in 1971 and the USC Associates Award for Excellence in Teaching in 1973.

His research took him to universities and institutes around the world to study their collections. Among his appointments was a six-month Fulbright research fellowship at the Zoological Museum of Copenhagen in Denmark. He also participated in numerous oceanographic expeditions, including the International Indian Ocean Expedition aboard Anton Bruun in 1964, the Southeastern Pacific Biological Program aboard the same vessel in 1965, and USC expeditions to the Gulf of California and the Middle America Trench aboard Velero IV in 1967 and 1968.

From 1969 to 1979, Nafpaktitis participated, and occasionally served as chief scientist, in a ten-year ecological study funded by the National Science Foundation of the oceanic midwater zone off the coasts of Southern California and Mexico. In 1982, he was appointed to the University of Crete, where he helped establish the Department of Biological Sciences together with Greek molecular biologist Fotis Kafatos, then a professor of biology at Harvard University.

After his first year at the University of Crete, during which he played an important role in establishing the Institute of Marine Biology, Nafpaktitis returned regularly to teach seminars and assist in recruiting faculty to further develop the department. He continued this work until his retirement as professor emeritus; the USC obituary states that he retired in 1998.

During his time at USC, in addition to his teaching responsibilities and active research program, Nafpaktitis held numerous administrative positions, serving on and occasionally chairing departmental and university committees. In 1987 he served as acting director of the Allan Hancock Foundation. He was also a research associate in ichthyology at the Natural History Museum of Los Angeles County and served on the board of the American Society of Ichthyologists and Herpetologists from 1971 to 1976.

Nafpaktitis died on 24 May 2015 in Charlottesville, Virginia, at the age of 85, from complications associated with Parkinson's disease. He was survived by his wife, children, and grandchildren.

== Taxa described by Basil G. Nafpaktitis ==
- Diaphus antonbruuni Nafpaktitis, 1978
- Diaphus arabicus Nafpaktitis, 1978
- Diaphus bertelseni Nafpaktitis, 1966
- Diaphus diademophilus Nafpaktitis, 1978
- Diaphus impostor Nafpaktitis, Robertson & Paxton, 1995
- Diaphus kapalae Nafpaktitis, Robertson & Paxton, 1995
- Diaphus knappi Nafpaktitis, 1978
- Diaphus kora Nafpaktitis, Robertson & Paxton, 1995
- Diaphus kuroshio Kawaguchi & Nafpaktitis, 1978
- Diaphus lewisi Nafpaktitis, 1966
- Diaphus lobatus Nafpaktitis, 1978
- Diaphus meadi Nafpaktitis, 1978
- Diaphus megalops Nafpaktitis, 1978
- Diaphus minax Nafpaktitis, 1968
- Diaphus nielseni Nafpaktitis, 1978
- Diaphus roei Nafpaktitis, 1974
- Diaphus subtilis Nafpaktitis, 1968
- Diaphus wisneri Nafpaktitis, Robertson & Paxton, 1995
- Dorsadena yaquinae Coleman & Nafpaktitis, 1972
- Idiolychnus Nafpaktitis & Paxton, 1978
- Lampadena notialis Nafpaktitis & Paxton, 1968
- Lepidophanes indicus Nafpaktitis & Nafpaktitis, 1969
- Notoscopelus bolini Nafpaktitis, 1975
- Pareiophus Nafpaktitis, 1975
