= Diaphus impostor =

Conservation status
- Least Concern (IUCN 3.1)

Scientific classification
- Kingdom: Animalia
- Phylum: Chordata
- Class: Actinopterygii
- Order: Myctophiformes
- Family: Myctophidae
- Genus: Diaphus
- Species: D. impostor

Binomial name
- Diaphus impostor Nafpaktitis, D. A. Robertson & Paxton, 1995

Species of fish

Diaphus impostor, the imposter lanternfish, is a species of lanternfish found in the western-central Pacific Ocean.

== Etymology ==
The epithet impostor refers to the resemblance of this species to, and the possibility of confusion with, D. aliciae.
