= Gnathophis castlei =

Scientific classification
- Kingdom: Animalia
- Phylum: Chordata
- Class: Actinopterygii
- Order: Anguilliformes
- Family: Congridae
- Genus: Gnathophis
- Species: G. castlei

Binomial name
- Gnathophis castlei Karmovskaya & Paxton, 2000

Species of fish

Gnathophis castlei, or Castle's conger, is an eel in the family Congridae (conger/garden eels). It was described by Emma Stanislavovna Karmovskaya and John Richard Paxton in 2000. It is a marine, deep water-dwelling eel which is known from Queensland, Australia, in the western central Pacific Ocean. It dwells at a depth range of 131–366 metres. Males can reach a total length of 34.2 centimetres.

== Etymology ==
The species epithet refers to Peter Henry John Castle.
