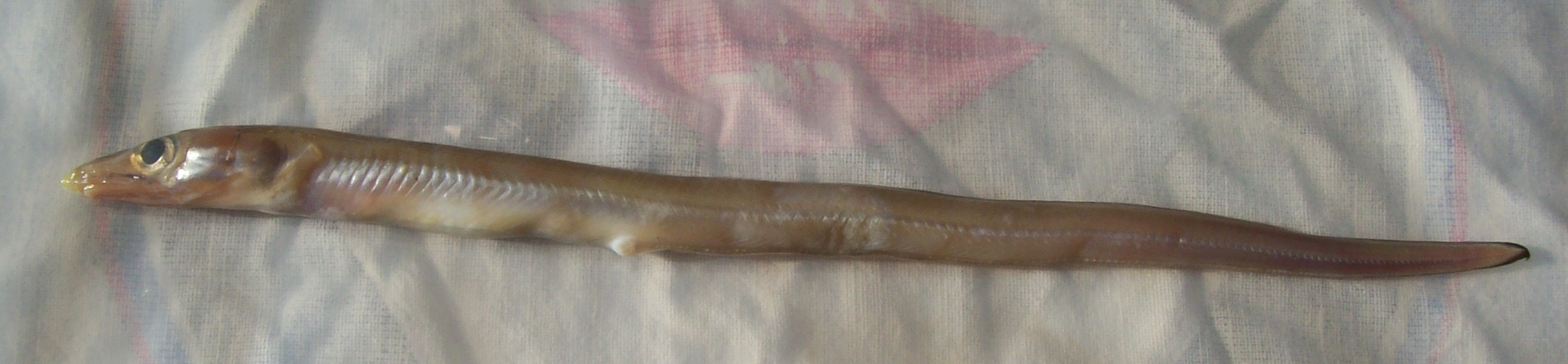
- Gnathophis mystax

Scientific classification
- Kingdom: Animalia
- Phylum: Chordata
- Class: Actinopterygii
- Order: Anguilliformes
- Family: Congridae
- Subfamily: Congrinae
- Genus: Gnathophis; Kaup, 1859

Type species
- Myrophis heterognathos Bleeker, 1858

Species
- See text.

Synonyms
- Euleptocephalus Strömman, 1896; Fimbriceps Whitley, 1946; Lemkea Kotthaus, 1968; Poutawa Griffin, 1936; Rhynchocymba D. S. Jordan & C. L. Hubbs, 1925

= Gnathophis =

Gnathophis Temporal range: Danian–Present

Genus of fishes

Gnathophis is a genus of marine congrid eels.

== Species ==
There are currently 31 recognized species in this genus:

- Gnathophis ajithi Kodeeswaran & Karmovskaya, 2025
- Gnathophis andriashevi Karmovskaya, 1990
- Gnathophis anilmohapatrai Kodeeswaran & Karmovskaya, 2025
- Gnathophis arabicus Kodeeswaran & Karmovskaya, 2025
- Gnathophis asanoi Karmovskaya, 2004
- Gnathophis bathytopos D. G. Smith & Kanazawa, 1977 (blackgut conger)
- Gnathophis bracheatopos D. G. Smith & Kanazawa, 1977 (longeye conger)
- Gnathophis capensis (Kaup, 1856) (Southern Atlantic conger)
- Gnathophis castlei Karmovskaya & Paxton, 2000 (Castle's conger)
- Gnathophis cinctus (Garman, 1899) (hardtail conger)
- Gnathophis codoniphorus Maul, 1972
- Gnathophis ginanago (Asano, 1958)
- Gnathophis grahami Karmovskaya & Paxton, 2000 (Graham's conger)
- Gnathophis habenatus (J. Richardson, 1848) (little conger eel)
- Gnathophis heterognathos (Bleeker, 1858)
- Gnathophis heterolinea (Kotthaus, 1968)
- Gnathophis johnsoni Prokofiev, Frable, Emelianova, Saveleva & Orlov, 2025
- Gnathophis leptosomatus Karrer, 1982
- Gnathophis longicauda (E. P. Ramsay & J. D. Ogilby, 1888) (little conger)
- Gnathophis macroporis Karmovskaya & Paxton, 2000 (largepore conger)
- Gnathophis melanocoelus Karmovskaya & Paxton, 2000 (blackgut conger)
- Gnathophis microps Karmovskaya & Paxton, 2000 (smalleye conger)
- Gnathophis musteliceps (Alcock, 1894)
- Gnathophis mystax (Delaroche, 1809) (thinlip conger)
- Gnathophis nasutus Karmovskaya & Paxton, 2000
- Gnathophis neocaledoniensis Karmovskaya, 2004
- Gnathophis nystromi (D. S. Jordan & Snyder, 1901)
- Gnathophis parini Karmovskaya, 1990
- Gnathophis smithi Karmovskaya, 1990
- Gnathophis tritos D. G. Smith & Kanazawa, 1977
- Gnathophis umbrellabius (Whitley, 1946) (umbrella conger)
- Gnathophis xenica (Matsubara & Ochiai, 1951)

== See also ==
- Prehistoric fish
- List of prehistoric bony fish
