= Gnathophis melanocoelus =

Scientific classification
- Kingdom: Animalia
- Phylum: Chordata
- Class: Actinopterygii
- Order: Anguilliformes
- Family: Congridae
- Genus: Gnathophis
- Species: G. melanocoelus

Binomial name
- Gnathophis melanocoelus Karmovskaya & Paxton, 2000

Species of fish

Gnathophis melanocoelus (known commonly as the Blackgut conger) is an eel in the family Congridae (conger/garden eels). It was described by Emma Stanislavovna Karmovskaya and John Richard Paxton in 2000. It is a subtropical, marine eel which is known from western Australia, in the eastern Indian Ocean. It is known to dwell at a depth of 156 metres.
