= Diaphus wisneri =

Conservation status
- Least Concern (IUCN 3.1)

Scientific classification
- Kingdom: Animalia
- Phylum: Chordata
- Class: Actinopterygii
- Order: Myctophiformes
- Family: Myctophidae
- Genus: Diaphus
- Species: D. wisneri

Binomial name
- Diaphus wisneri Nafpaktitis, D. A. Robertson & Paxton, 1995

Species of fish

Diaphus wisneri is a species of lanternfish found in the Pacific Ocean.

== Etymology ==
The fish is named in honor of Robert L. Wisner (1921–2005), Scripps Institution of Oceanography, for his work on the taxonomy and distribution of myctophids.
