= Gnathophis macroporis =

Conservation status
- Least Concern (IUCN 3.1)

Scientific classification
- Kingdom: Animalia
- Phylum: Chordata
- Class: Actinopterygii
- Order: Anguilliformes
- Family: Congridae
- Genus: Gnathophis
- Species: G. macroporis

Binomial name
- Gnathophis macroporis Karmovskaya & Paxton, 2000

Species of fish

Gnathophis macroporis, the largepore conger, is an eel in the family Congridae (conger/garden eels). It was described by Emma Stanislavovna Karmovskaya and John Richard Paxton in 2000. It is a marine, temperate water-dwelling eel from Victoria, Australia, in the eastern Indian Ocean. It is known to dwell at a depth of 164 metres (538 ft)
