= Gnathophis grahami =

Conservation status
- Least Concern (IUCN 3.1)

Scientific classification
- Kingdom: Animalia
- Phylum: Chordata
- Class: Actinopterygii
- Order: Anguilliformes
- Family: Congridae
- Genus: Gnathophis
- Species: G. grahami

Binomial name
- Gnathophis grahami Karmovskaya & Paxton, 2000

Species of fish

Gnathophis grahami, or Graham's conger, is an eel in the family Congridae (conger/garden eels). It was described by Emma Stanislavovna Karmovskaya and John Richard Paxton in 2000. It is a subtropical, marine eel which is known from New South Wales, Australia, in the southwestern Pacific Ocean. It dwells at a depth range of 50–350 metres.

== Etymology ==
The fish is named in honor of Kenneth Graham (b. 1947), with the New South Wales Fisheries, who provided the type specimen of this species and other east coast specimens to the Australian Museum.
