= Diaphus kapalae =

Conservation status
- Least Concern (IUCN 3.1)

Scientific classification
- Kingdom: Animalia
- Phylum: Chordata
- Class: Actinopterygii
- Order: Myctophiformes
- Family: Myctophidae
- Genus: Diaphus
- Species: D. kapalae

Binomial name
- Diaphus kapalae Nafpaktitis, D. A. Robertson & Paxton, 1995

Species of fish

Diaphus kapalae, the Kapala lanternfish, is a species of lanternfish found in the southwestern Pacific Ocean.

== Etymology ==
The fish is named in honor of the fisheries research vessel Kapala, which has collected numerous specimens off the coast of New South Wales, including the type specimen of this species.
