= Diaphus kora =

Conservation status
- Data Deficient (IUCN 3.1)

Scientific classification
- Kingdom: Animalia
- Phylum: Chordata
- Class: Actinopterygii
- Order: Myctophiformes
- Family: Myctophidae
- Genus: Diaphus
- Species: D. kora

Binomial name
- Diaphus kora Nafpaktitis, D. A. Robertson & Paxton, 1995

Species of fish

Diaphus kora is a species of lanternfish found in the south-western Pacific Ocean.
