= Gnathophis nasutus =

Conservation status
- Least Concern (IUCN 3.1)

Scientific classification
- Kingdom: Animalia
- Phylum: Chordata
- Class: Actinopterygii
- Order: Anguilliformes
- Family: Congridae
- Genus: Gnathophis
- Species: G. nasutus

Binomial name
- Gnathophis nasutus Karmovskaya & Paxton, 2000

Species of fish

Gnathophis nasutus (known commonly as the bignose conger) is an eel in the family Congridae (conger/garden eels). It was described by Emma Stanislavovna Karmovskaya and John Richard Paxton in 2000. It is a tropical, marine eel which is known from western Australia, in the eastern Indian Ocean. It dwells at a depth range of 80–140 metres.
