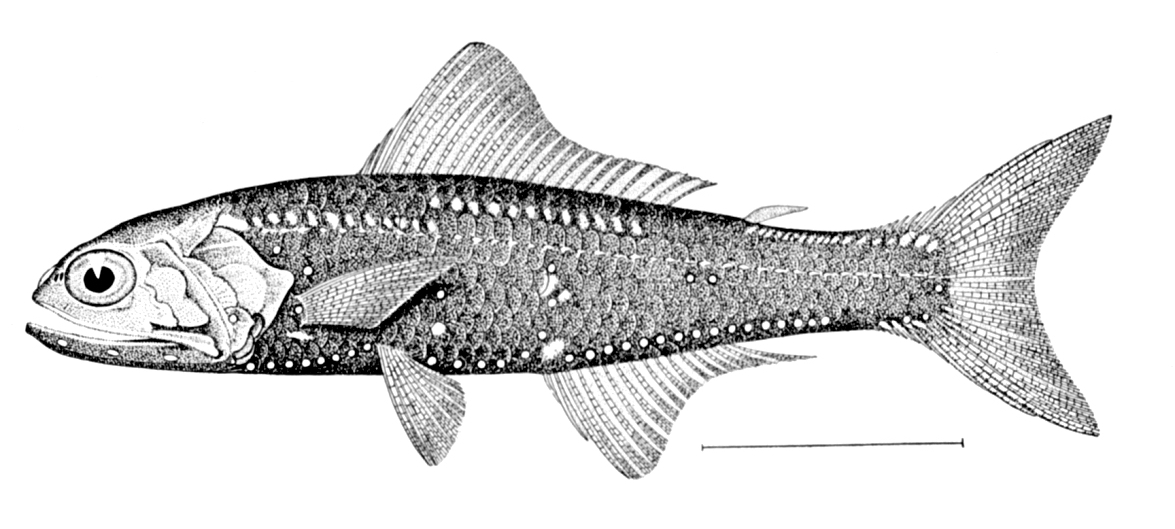

Conservation status
- Least Concern (IUCN 3.1)

Scientific classification
- Kingdom: Animalia
- Phylum: Chordata
- Class: Actinopterygii
- Order: Myctophiformes
- Family: Myctophidae
- Genus: Notoscopelus
- Species: N. resplendens

Binomial name
- Notoscopelus resplendens (Richardson, 1845)

Synonyms
- Lampanyctus resplendens Richardson, 1845; Notoscopelus (Notoscopelus) resplendens (Richardson, 1845); Notoscopelus brachychier C. H. Eigenmann & R. S. Eigenmann, 1889; Notoscopelus ejectus Waite, 1904; Scopelus resplendens (Richardson, 1845); Serpa hoffmanni Fowler, 1934

= Notoscopelus resplendens =

Species of fish

Notoscopelus resplendens, commonly known as the patchwork lampfish or patchwork lanternfish, is a species of lanternfish in the family Myctophidae. It is found in the eastern and western Atlantic Ocean, the Indian Ocean and parts of the Pacific Ocean. It spends the daylight hours in deep water, rising at night to near the surface. This fish was first described by the Scottish naturalist and arctic explorer John Richardson in 1845.

== Description ==
Notoscopelus resplendens is a small lanternfish, growing to a maximum length of 95 mm (3.7 in). The dorsal fin has 22 to 23 soft rays, the anal fin has 18 to 19 soft rays and the pectoral fins have 12 to 13 soft rays. Above the caudal peduncle there is a row of eight to nine luminous scale-like segments in adult males, but male fish lack luminous organs above the eye and on the cheek.

== Distribution ==
The species has a widespread distribution in warmer oceans. Its range includes the Atlantic Ocean between about 40°N (47°N in the west and 35°N in the east) and 40°S. Separate populations are also present in the Indian Ocean, the western North Pacific and the eastern Pacific. This fish spends the day at depths of between 650 and 1,000 m (2,100 and 3,300 ft) and rises to the top 300 m (1,000 ft) at night; young individuals and transforming ones do not make this daily vertical migration.

== Status ==
N. resplendens is a common species of fish with a very wide range. It is not exploited by man and faces no particular threats, so the International Union for Conservation of Nature has listed its conservation status as being of least concern.
