= Gnathophis tritos =

Conservation status
- Least Concern (IUCN 3.1)

Scientific classification
- Kingdom: Animalia
- Phylum: Chordata
- Class: Actinopterygii
- Order: Anguilliformes
- Family: Congridae
- Genus: Gnathophis
- Species: G. tritos

Binomial name
- Gnathophis tritos D. G. Smith & Kanazawa, 1977

Species of fish

Gnathophis tritos is an eel in the family Congridae (conger/garden eels). It was described by David G. Smith and Robert H. Kanazawa in 1977. It is a marine, deep water-dwelling eel which is known from the Straits of Florida, in the western central Atlantic Ocean. It dwells at a depth range of 458–567 meters.

Gnathophis tritos was given its species epithet due to its being the third species in its genus discovered in the western Atlantic.
