= Gnathophis nystromi =

Scientific classification
- Kingdom: Animalia
- Phylum: Chordata
- Class: Actinopterygii
- Order: Anguilliformes
- Family: Congridae
- Genus: Gnathophis
- Species: G. nystromi

Binomial name
- Gnathophis nystromi (Jordan & Snyder, 1901)

Subspecies
- Gnathophis nystromi nystromi (Jordan & Snyder, 1901); Gnathophis nystromi ginanago (Asano, 1958)

Synonyms
- Leptocephalus nystromi Jordan & Snyder, 1901; Rhynchocymba nystromi (Jordan & Snyder, 1901); Rhynchocymba nystromi nystromi (Jordan & Snyder, 1901); Rhynchocymba nystromi ginanago Asano, 1958

Species of fish

Gnathophis nystromi (known commonly as the conger eel) is an eel in the family Congridae (conger/garden eels). It was described by David Starr Jordan and John Otterbein Snyder in 1901, originally under the genus Leptocephalus. It contains two subspecies, Gnathophis nystromi nystromi, and Gnathophis nystromi ginanago, which was described by Hirotoshi Asano in 1958, originally under the genus Rhynchocymba.

G. nystromi nystromi is a tropical, marine eel which is known from the western Pacific Ocean, including Japan, the South China Sea, and Hawaii. It dwells at a depth range of 250–355 meters, and inhabits reefs. Males can reach a maximum total length of 45 cm (1 ft 6 in), but more commonly reach a TL of 35 cm (1 ft 2 in).

G. nystromi ginanago is a marine, temperate water-dwelling eel which is known from Japan, in the northwestern Pacific Ocean. Males can reach a maximum total length of 40 centimeters.
