= Diaphus antonbruuni =

Conservation status
- Least Concern (IUCN 3.1)

Scientific classification
- Kingdom: Animalia
- Phylum: Chordata
- Class: Actinopterygii
- Order: Myctophiformes
- Family: Myctophidae
- Genus: Diaphus
- Species: D. antonbruuni

Binomial name
- Diaphus antonbruuni Nafpaktitis, 1978

Species of fish

Diaphus antonbruuni, also known as Bruun's lanternfish, is a species of lanternfish found in the Indian Ocean.

== Description ==
This species reaches a length of 5.5 cm (2.2 in).

== Etymology ==
The fish is named in honor of the Danish marine biologist Anton Frederick Bruun (1901–1961) and the research vessel Anton Bruun that bore his name and which collected the type specimen.
