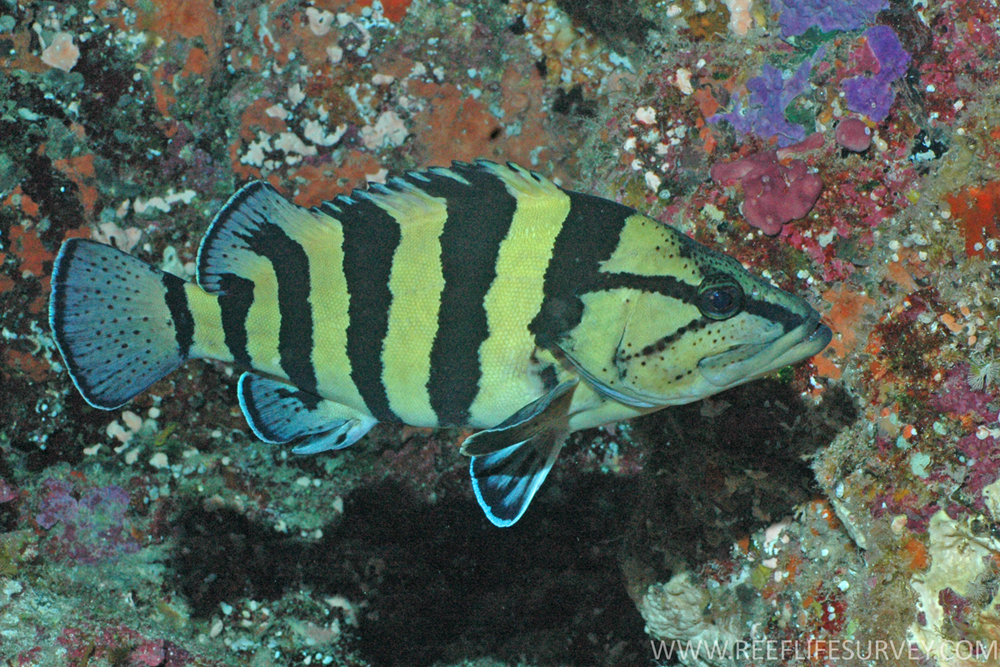
- Acanthistius cinctus

Conservation status
- Least Concern (IUCN 3.1)

Scientific classification
- Kingdom: Animalia
- Phylum: Chordata
- Class: Actinopterygii
- Order: Perciformes
- Family: Anthiadidae
- Genus: Acanthistius
- Species: A. cinctus

Binomial name
- Acanthistius cinctus (Günther, 1859)

= Yellowbanded perch =

Yellowbanded Perch

Species of fish

The yellowbanded perch (Acanthistius cinctus), also known as the yellowbanded wirrah and girdled rock cod, is a species of ray-finned fish in the family Serranidae, the groupers and sea basses. It is native to the southern Pacific Ocean, where it occurs along the coasts of eastern Australia and New Zealand.

This species reaches up to 50 centimeters in length. It is yellowish in color with thick vertical dark bands.

This fish lives in the benthic zone along coastlines. It can be found on reefs, including the Great Barrier and Middleton Reefs.
