= Gnathophis leptosomatus =

Conservation status
- Least Concern (IUCN 3.1)

Scientific classification
- Kingdom: Animalia
- Phylum: Chordata
- Class: Actinopterygii
- Order: Anguilliformes
- Family: Congridae
- Genus: Gnathophis
- Species: G. leptosomatus

Binomial name
- Gnathophis leptosomatus Karrer, 1983

Species of fish

Gnathophis leptosomatus is an eel in the family Congridae (conger/garden eels). It was described by Christine Karrer in 1983. It is a marine, deep water-dwelling eel which is known from Madagascar, in the western Indian Ocean. It dwells at a depth range of 420–428 metres.
