= Diaphus nielseni =

Conservation status
- Least Concern (IUCN 3.1)

Scientific classification
- Kingdom: Animalia
- Phylum: Chordata
- Class: Actinopterygii
- Order: Myctophiformes
- Family: Myctophidae
- Genus: Diaphus
- Species: D. nielseni

Binomial name
- Diaphus nielseni Nafpaktitis, 1978

Species of fish

Diaphus nielseni is a species of lanternfish found in the Indo-Pacific Ocean.

== Description ==
This species reaches a length of 4.0 cm (1.6 in).

== Etymology ==
The fish is named in honor of Jørgen G. Nielsen (b. 1932), the Curator of Fishes, at the Zoological Museum of Copenhagen, to whom Nafpaktitis was most grateful for his hospitality and his help during the long period of study of the Dana Collections, which are stored at Nielsen's museum.
