= Gnathophis bathytopos =

Conservation status
- Least Concern (IUCN 3.1)

Scientific classification
- Kingdom: Animalia
- Phylum: Chordata
- Class: Actinopterygii
- Division: Teleostei
- Order: Anguilliformes
- Family: Congridae
- Genus: Gnathophis
- Species: G. bathytopos

Binomial name
- Gnathophis bathytopos D. G. Smith & Kanazawa, 1977

Species of fish

Gnathophis bathytopos, the blackgut conger, is an eel in the family Congridae (conger/garden eels). It was described by David G. Smith and Robert H. Kanazawa in 1977. It is a marine, deep water-dwelling eel which is known from the Straits of Florida, USA, and the southeastern Gulf of Mexico, in the western Atlantic Ocean. It dwells at a depth range of 180–370 meters. Males can reach a maximum total length of 35 cm (14 in; 1.15 ft).
