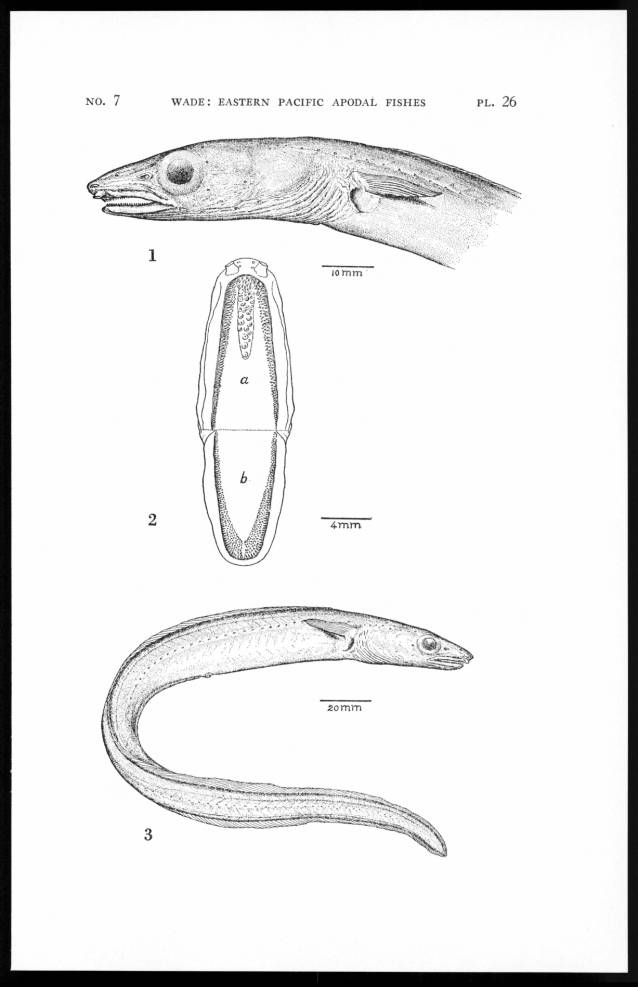

Conservation status
- Least Concern (IUCN 3.1)

Scientific classification
- Kingdom: Animalia
- Phylum: Chordata
- Class: Actinopterygii
- Order: Anguilliformes
- Family: Congridae
- Genus: Gnathophis
- Species: G. cinctus

Binomial name
- Gnathophis cinctus (Garman, 1899)

Synonyms
- Atopichthys cinctus Garman, 1899; Rhynchocymba catalinensis Wade, 1946; Gnathophis catalinensis (Wade, 1946)

= Gnathophis cinctus =

Species of fish

Gnathophis cinctus, the hardtail conger or Catalina conger, is an eel in the family Congridae (conger/garden eels). It was described by Samuel Garman in 1899, originally under the genus Atopichthys. It is a tropical, marine eel which is known from the eastern central and southeastern Pacific Ocean, including Chile, Colombia, Costa Rica, Ecuador, El Salvador, Guatemala, Honduras, Mexico, Nicaragua, Panama, Peru, and the United States. It dwells at a depth range of 9–336 metres, and leads a benthic lifestyle, burrowing into loose sand. Males can reach a maximum total length of 42 cm (17 in; 1.38 ft).

The hardtail conger feeds on other conger eels. Due to its widespread distribution, lack of known threats, and lack of observed population decline, the IUCN redlist currently lists the hardtail conger as Least Concern.
