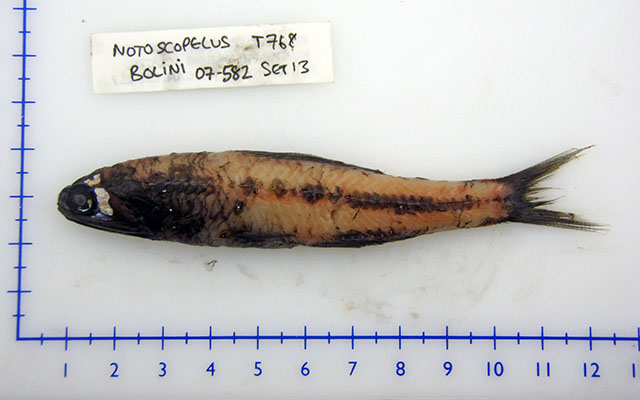
- Notoscopelus bolini

Conservation status
- Least Concern (IUCN 3.1)

Scientific classification
- Kingdom: Animalia
- Phylum: Chordata
- Class: Actinopterygii
- Division: Teleostei
- Order: Myctophiformes
- Family: Myctophidae
- Genus: Notoscopelus
- Species: N. bolini

Binomial name
- Notoscopelus bolini Nafpaktitis, 1975

Synonyms
- Notoscopelus (Pareiophus) bolini Nafpaktitis, 1975

= Notoscopelus bolini =

Species of fish

Notoscopelus bolini is a species of lanternfish belonging to the family Myctophidae. It is found in the North Atlantic Ocean and the Mediterranean Sea. It was first described in 1975 by the American ichthyologist Basil Nafpaktitis and named in honour of the American marine biologist Rolf Ling Bolin who had reviewed the genus in 1959.

== Description ==
Notoscopelus bolini can be distinguished from other members of the genus by the fact that adult males do not have a luminous gland at the top of the caudal peduncle, but do have large patches of bioluminescent tissue on the cheek and above the eye. These patches are separated from the eye by dark pigmented skin. The maximum size of this fish in the Atlantic is about 102 mm (4.0 in), but Mediterranean fish are smaller with a maximum length of 87 mm (3.4 in).

== Distribution ==
N. bolini is found in the Atlantic Ocean and the Mediterranean Sea. Its range extends in the North Atlantic from about 50°N to about 35°N, mainly to the east of 50°W. However, there are some separate areas where it is found, these being around the Canary Islands and off the coast of Mauritania where there is an area of upwelling water. It also occurs in the deep parts of both the eastern and western Mediterranean Sea. This fish undertakes a daily vertical migration; during the day it is usually about 1,000 m (3,300 ft) beneath the surface, but it rises at night to within about 125 m (400 ft) of the surface.

== Ecology ==
In a study of the feeding habits of mesopelagic fish in the northwestern Atlantic, it was found that the diet of N. bolini consisted mostly of krill, with a smaller proportion of copepods and some fish larvae. This food is consumed at night in the surface waters, and the fish does not feed in the deep waters where it spends the day.
