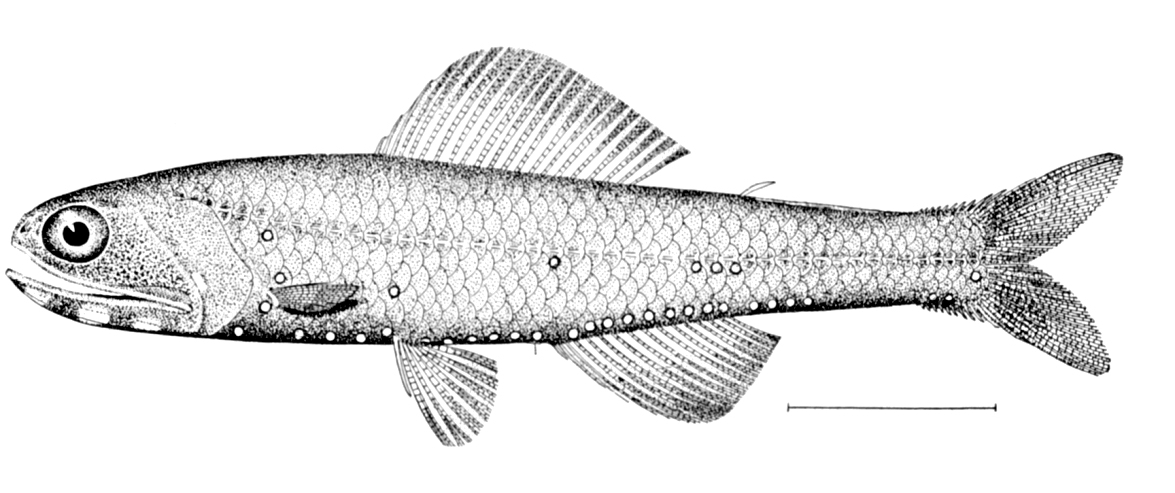
- Lancet fish

Scientific classification
- Kingdom: Animalia
- Phylum: Chordata
- Class: Actinopterygii
- Order: Myctophiformes
- Family: Myctophidae
- Genus: Notoscopelus
- Species: N. kroyeri

Binomial name
- Notoscopelus kroyeri (Malm, 1861)

Synonyms
- Notoscopellus castaneus Goode & Bean, 1896; Notoscopellus quercinus Goode & Bean, 1896; Notoscopelus (Notoscopelus) kroeyeri (Malm, 1861); Notoscopelus castaneus Goode & Bean, 1896; Notoscopelus kroeyeri (Malm, 1861); Notoscopelus kroeyerii (Malm, 1861); Notoscopelus margaritiferus Goode & Bean, 1896; Notoscopelus quercinus Goode & Bean, 1896; Scopelus kroyeri Malm, 1861

= Notoscopelus kroyeri =

Species of fish

Notoscopelus kroyeri, commonly known as the lancet fish, is a species of lanternfish in the family Myctophidae. It is endemic to the North Atlantic Ocean where it is found in deep water habitats, spending its day at great depths and its night near the surface. It was previously regarded by some authorities as being a subspecies of Notoscopelus elongatus; one of the differences between the two being that N. elongatus has 25 or fewer gill rakers while N. kroyeri has 26 or more.

== Description ==
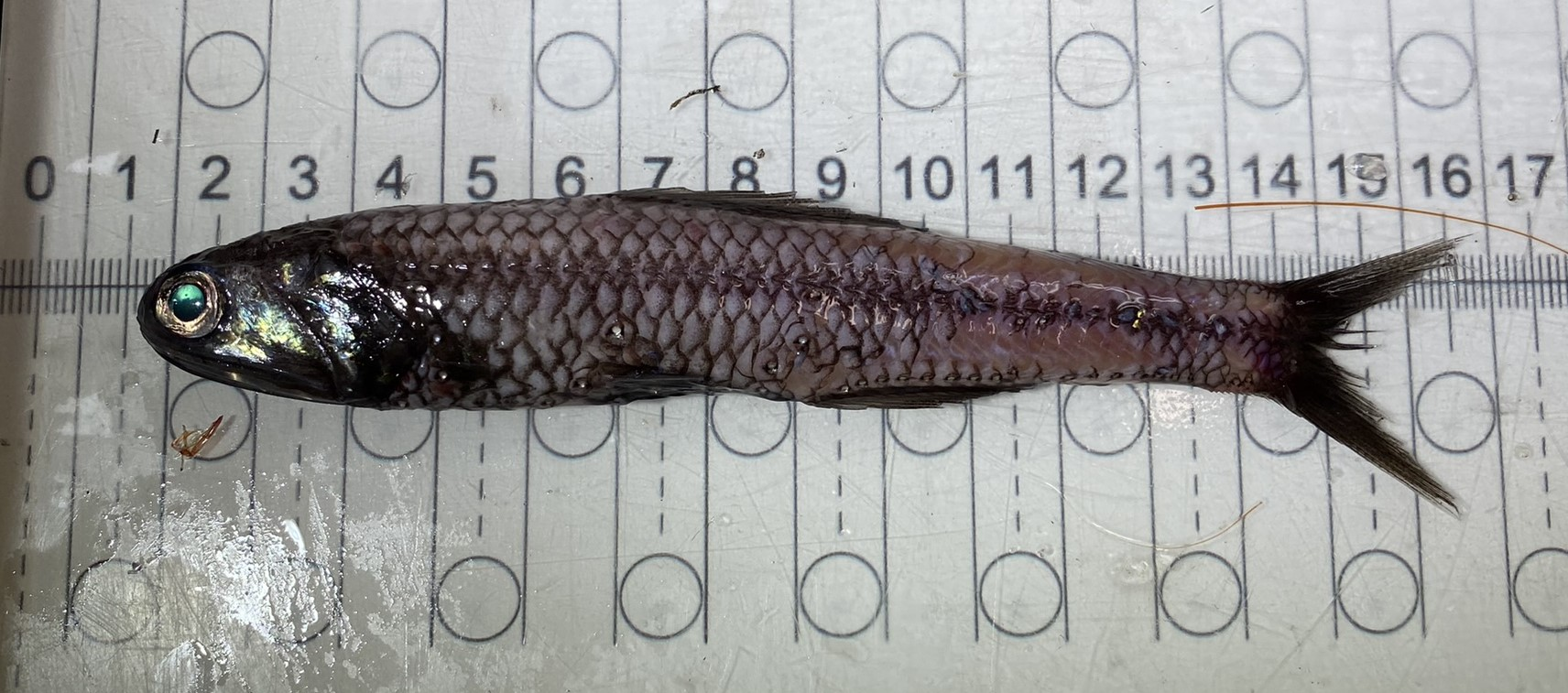
A freshly caught specimen of Notoscopelus kroyerii.

Notoscopelus kroyeri is a torpedo-shaped fish that grows to a maximum length of 143 mm (5.6 in). The dorsal fin has 21 or 22 soft rays, the anal fin has 18 to 20 soft rays and the pectoral fins have 12 to 13. Like other members of the genus, it has many small photophores on the sides and flanks of the fish, arranged in a fashion that is characteristic to this species. Mature males have a gland consisting of eight or nine luminous scale-like segments on the dorsal surface of the caudal peduncle, but they lack the bioluminescent patches on the cheek and above the eye that are characteristic of some members of the genus.

== Distribution ==
N. kroyeri is endemic to the North Atlantic Ocean, its range lying between 40°N to 60°N on the western side and between 37°N and 70°N on the eastern side. During the day it occurs at depths between about 325 and 1,000 m (1,100 and 3,300 ft) or more, and at night it makes a vertical migration and rises to between 0 and 125 m (0 and 400 ft), its maximum abundance being in the top 40 m (130 ft) of the water.
