= Diaphus minax =

Conservation status
- Least Concern (IUCN 3.1)

Scientific classification
- Kingdom: Animalia
- Phylum: Chordata
- Class: Actinopterygii
- Division: Teleostei
- Order: Myctophiformes
- Family: Myctophidae
- Genus: Diaphus
- Species: D. minax

Binomial name
- Diaphus minax Nafpaktitis, 1968

Species of fish

Diaphus minax is a species of lanternfish found in Cuba.
