= Gnathophis andriashevi =

Conservation status
- Least Concern (IUCN 3.1)

Scientific classification
- Kingdom: Animalia
- Phylum: Chordata
- Class: Actinopterygii
- Order: Anguilliformes
- Family: Congridae
- Genus: Gnathophis
- Species: G. andriashevi

Binomial name
- Gnathophis andriashevi Karmovskaya, 1990

Synonyms
- Gnatophis andriashevi Karmovskaya, 1990 (misspelling)

Species of fish

Gnathophis andriashevi is an eel in the family Congridae (conger/garden eels). It was described by Emma Stanislavovna Karmovskaya in 1990. It is a marine, deep water-dwelling eel which is known from the western part of the Sala y Gomez Ridge, in the southeastern Pacific Ocean. It dwells at a depth range of 260–330 metres. Females can reach a maximum total length of 36.5 cm (14.4 in; 1.20 ft).

The species epithet "andriashevi" was given in honour of Anatoly Andriyashev's 80th birthday.
