= Diaphus kuroshio =

Conservation status
- Least Concern (IUCN 3.1)

Scientific classification
- Kingdom: Animalia
- Phylum: Chordata
- Class: Actinopterygii
- Order: Myctophiformes
- Family: Myctophidae
- Genus: Diaphus
- Species: D. kuroshio

Binomial name
- Diaphus kuroshio Kawaguchi & Nafpaktitis, 1978

Synonyms
- Myctophum fulgens A. B. Brauer, 1904

Species of fish

Diaphus kuroshio is a species of lanternfish found in the north-western Pacific Ocean.

== Description ==
This species reaches a length of 6.3 cm (2.5 in).

== Etymology ==
The fish was named for its occurrence in the Kuroshio waters of Japan.
