= Gnathophis asanoi =

Scientific classification
- Kingdom: Animalia
- Phylum: Chordata
- Class: Actinopterygii
- Order: Anguilliformes
- Family: Congridae
- Genus: Gnathophis
- Species: G. asanoi

Binomial name
- Gnathophis asanoi Karmovskaya, 2004

Species of fish

Gnathophis asanoi is an eel in the family Congridae (conger/garden eels). It was described by Emma Stanislavovna Karmovskaya in 2004. It is a marine, deep water-dwelling eel which is known from the Philippines, in the western Pacific Ocean. It dwells at a depth range of 280–440 metres. Males can reach a maximum total length of 35 cm (14 in; 1.15 ft).

The species epithet "asanoi" refers to Hirotoshi Asano, and was given in honour of his contribution to the study of Japanese species in the family Congridae.
