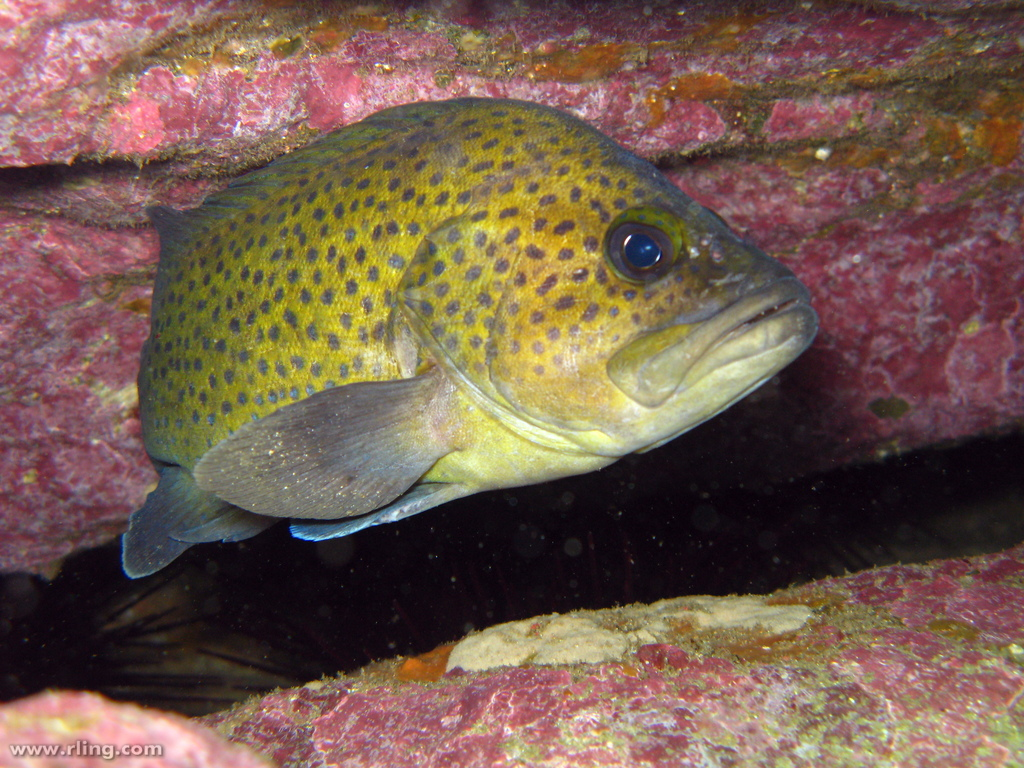
- Acanthistius ocellatus
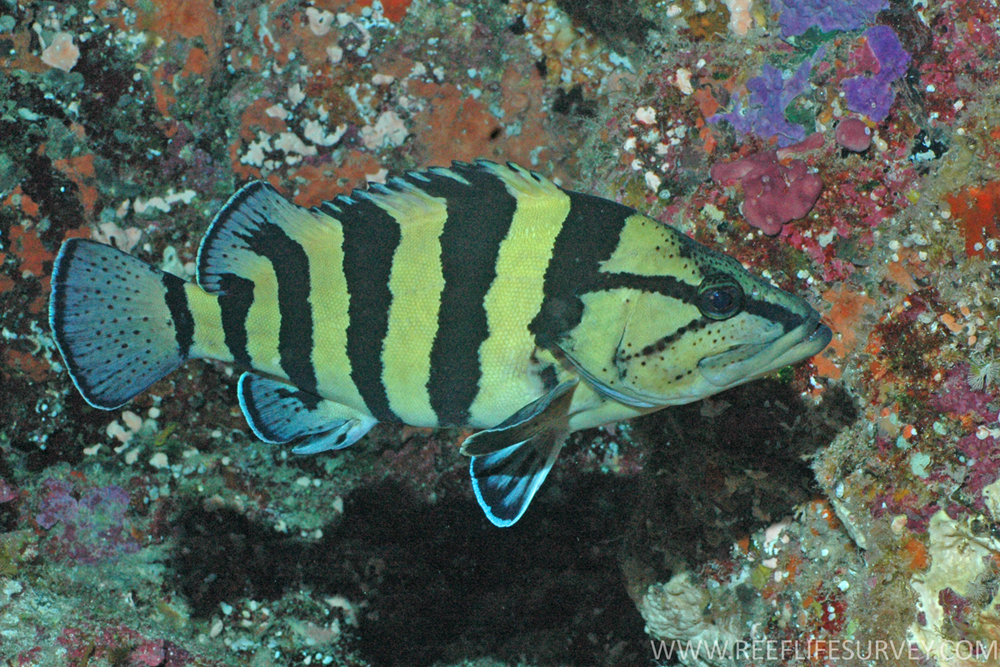
- Acanthistius cinctus

Scientific classification
- Kingdom: Animalia
- Phylum: Chordata
- Class: Actinopterygii
- Order: Perciformes
- Family: Anthiadidae
- Genus: Acanthistius; Bloch, 1793

Type species
- Plectropoma serratum Cuvier, 1828

Species
- See text.

= Acanthistius =

Genus of ray-finned fishes

Acanthistius is a genus of ray-finned fish. Some authors place the genus in the family Anthiadidae, while others consider it to be incertae sedis, where it is not clear which family it belongs to.

== Species ==
There are 11 species in the genus:

- Acanthistius brasilianus (Cuvier, 1828) – Argentine sea bass
- Acanthistius cinctus (Günther, 1859) – yellowbanded perch
- Acanthistius fuscus Regan, 1913 – Rapanui seabass
- Acanthistius joanae Heemstra, 2010 – scalyjaw koester
- Acanthistius ocellatus (Günther, 1859) – eastern wirrah
- Acanthistius pardalotus Hutchins, 1981 – leopard wirrah
- Acanthistius patachonicus (Jenyns, 1840)
- Acanthistius paxtoni Hutchins & Kuiter, 1982 – orangelined wirra
- Acanthistius pictus (Tschudi, 1846) – brick seabass
- Acanthistius sebastoides (Castelnau, 1861) – koester
- Acanthistius serratus (Cuvier, 1828) – western wirrah
