= Gnathophis neocaledoniensis =

Conservation status
- Least Concern (IUCN 3.1)

Scientific classification
- Kingdom: Animalia
- Phylum: Chordata
- Class: Actinopterygii
- Order: Anguilliformes
- Family: Congridae
- Genus: Gnathophis
- Species: G. neocaledoniensis

Binomial name
- Gnathophis neocaledoniensis Karmovskaya, 2004

Species of fish

Gnathophis neocaledoniensis is an eel in the family Congridae (conger/garden eels). It was described by Emma Stanislavovna Karmovskaya in 2004. It is a marine, deep water-dwelling eel which is known from New Caledonia (from which its species epithet is derived), in the western Pacific Ocean. It dwells at a depth range of 520–580 metres. Males can reach a maximum total length of 18.5 centimetres.
