= Idiolychnus =

Scientific classification
- Kingdom: Animalia
- Phylum: Chordata
- Class: Actinopterygii
- Order: Myctophiformes
- Family: Myctophidae
- Genus: Idiolychnus; B. G. Nafpaktitis & Paxton, 1978
- Species: I. urolampus

Binomial name
- Idiolychnus urolampus (C. H. Gilbert & Cramer, 1897)

Genus of fishes

Idiolychnus urolampus is a species of lanternfish known from the Pacific and Indian Oceans. This species grows to a length of 11.0 centimetres (4.3 in) SL.
