= Gnathophis xenica =

Conservation status
- Data Deficient (IUCN 3.1)

Scientific classification
- Kingdom: Animalia
- Phylum: Chordata
- Class: Actinopterygii
- Order: Anguilliformes
- Family: Congridae
- Genus: Gnathophis
- Species: G. xenica

Binomial name
- Gnathophis xenica (Matsubara & Ochiai, 1951)

Synonyms
- Arisoma nystromi xenica Matsubara & Ochiai, 1951

Species of fish

Gnathophis xenica is an eel in the family Congridae (conger/garden eels). It was described by Kiyomatsu Matsubara and Akira Ochiai in 1951, originally as a subspecies of Arisoma nystromi. It is a marine, temperate water-dwelling eel which is known from Japan, in the northwestern Pacific Ocean. Males can reach a maximum total length of 32 centimeters.
