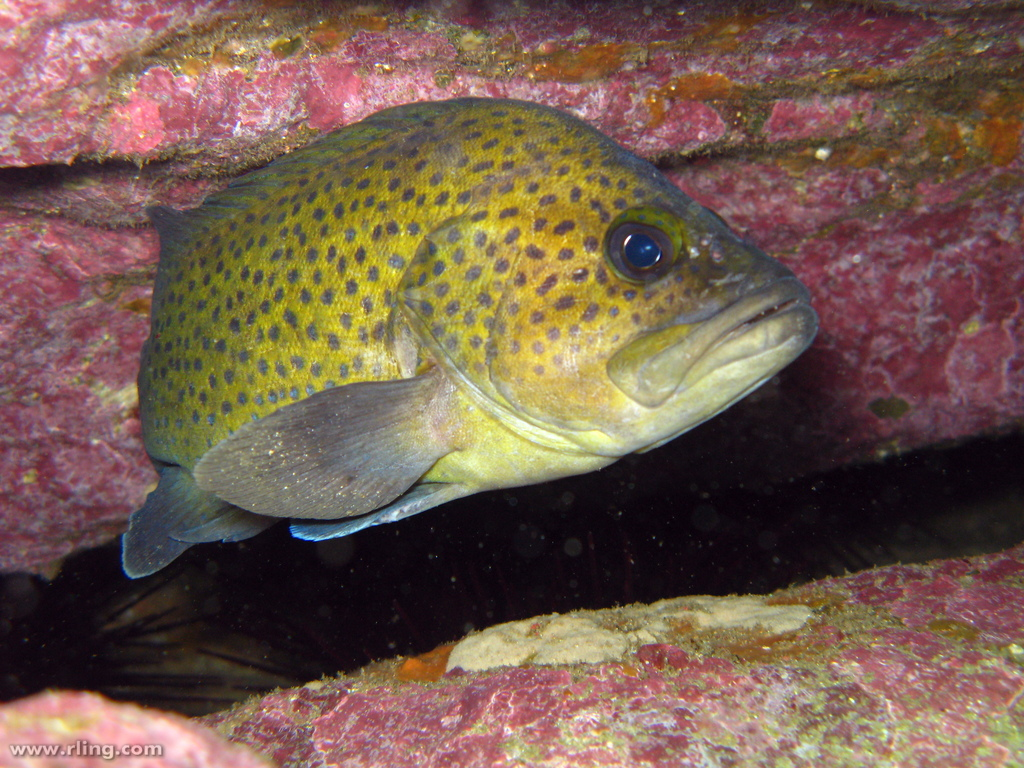
- Acanthistius ocellatus

Scientific classification
- Kingdom: Animalia
- Phylum: Chordata
- Class: Actinopterygii
- Order: Perciformes
- Family: Anthiadidae
- Genus: Acanthistius
- Species: A. ocellatus

Binomial name
- Acanthistius ocellatus (Günther, 1859)

= Acanthistius ocellatus =

Species of fish

Acanthistius ocellatus, also known as the eastern wirrah, is a species of ray-finned fish in the family Serranidae, the groupers and sea basses. The species is native to the southwestern portion of the Pacific Ocean.
