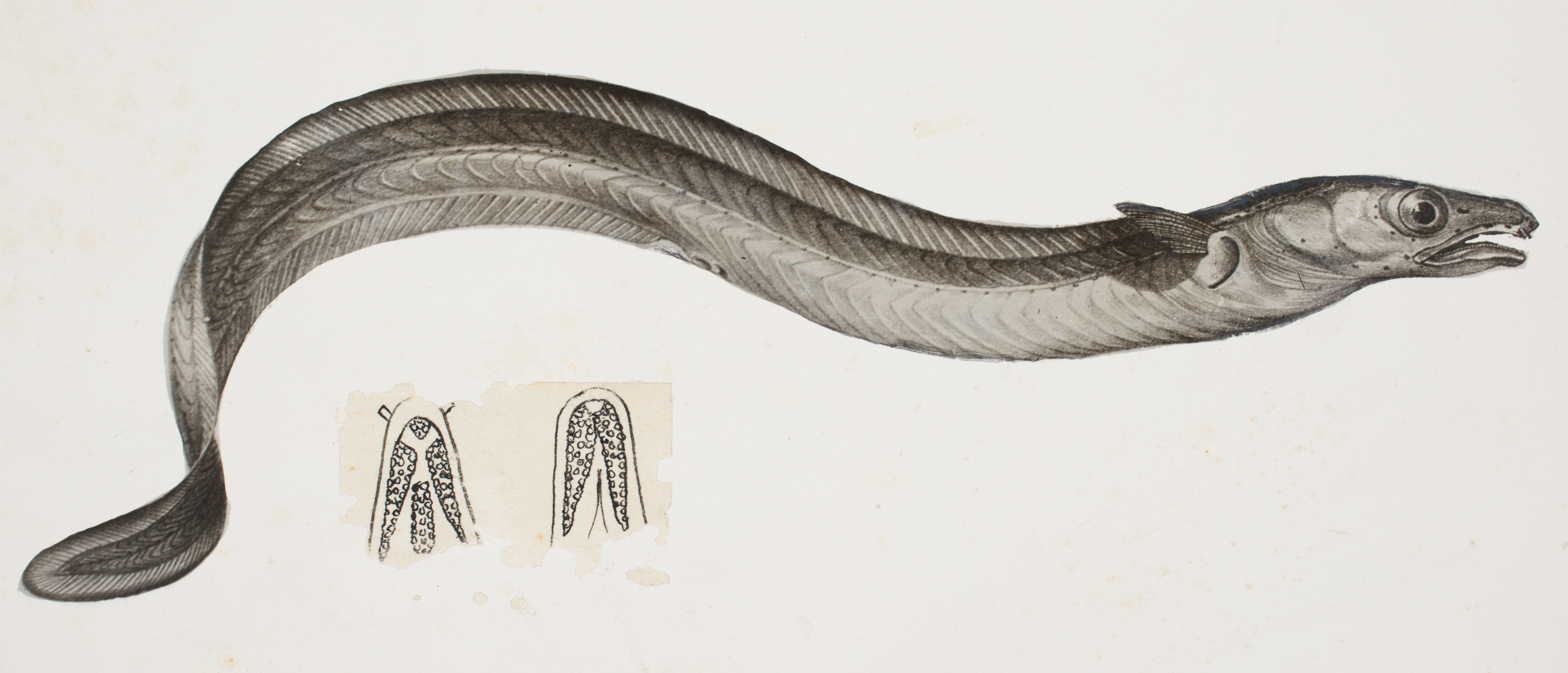
- 1920s illustration by Louis Thomas Griffin

Conservation status
- Least Concern (IUCN 3.1)

Scientific classification
- Kingdom: Animalia
- Phylum: Chordata
- Class: Actinopterygii
- Order: Anguilliformes
- Family: Congridae
- Genus: Gnathophis
- Species: G. habenatus

Binomial name
- Gnathophis habenatus (J. Richardson, 1848)

= Gnathophis habenatus =

Species of fish

Gnathophis habenatus, the little conger eel or silver conger, is a conger of the family Congridae, found on soft bottoms of the continental shelf of the Indian and southwest Pacific Oceans. Length is up to 43 cm.
