= Diaphus subtilis =

Conservation status
- Data Deficient (IUCN 3.1)

Scientific classification
- Kingdom: Animalia
- Phylum: Chordata
- Class: Actinopterygii
- Order: Myctophiformes
- Family: Myctophidae
- Genus: Diaphus
- Species: D. subtilis

Binomial name
- Diaphus subtilis Nafpaktitis, 1968

Species of fish

Diaphus subtilis is a species of lanternfish found in the Atlantic Ocean.

== Description ==
This species reaches a length of 8.5 cm (3.3 in).
