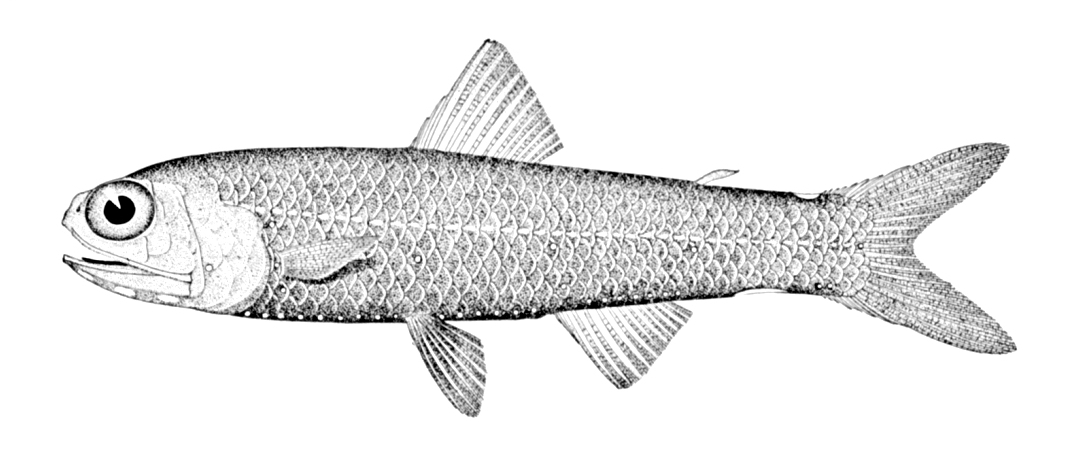

Conservation status
- Least Concern (IUCN 3.1)

Scientific classification
- Kingdom: Animalia
- Phylum: Chordata
- Class: Actinopterygii
- Order: Myctophiformes
- Family: Myctophidae
- Genus: Lampadena
- Species: L. speculigera

Binomial name
- Lampadena speculigera Goode & T. H. Bean, 1896

= Lampadena speculigera =

Species of fish

Lampadena speculigera is a species of lanternfish in the subfamily Lampanyctinae. It is a mesopelagic fish that is found in the Atlantic, Indian, and Pacific Oceans. Its vernacular name is mirror lanternfish.

== Description ==
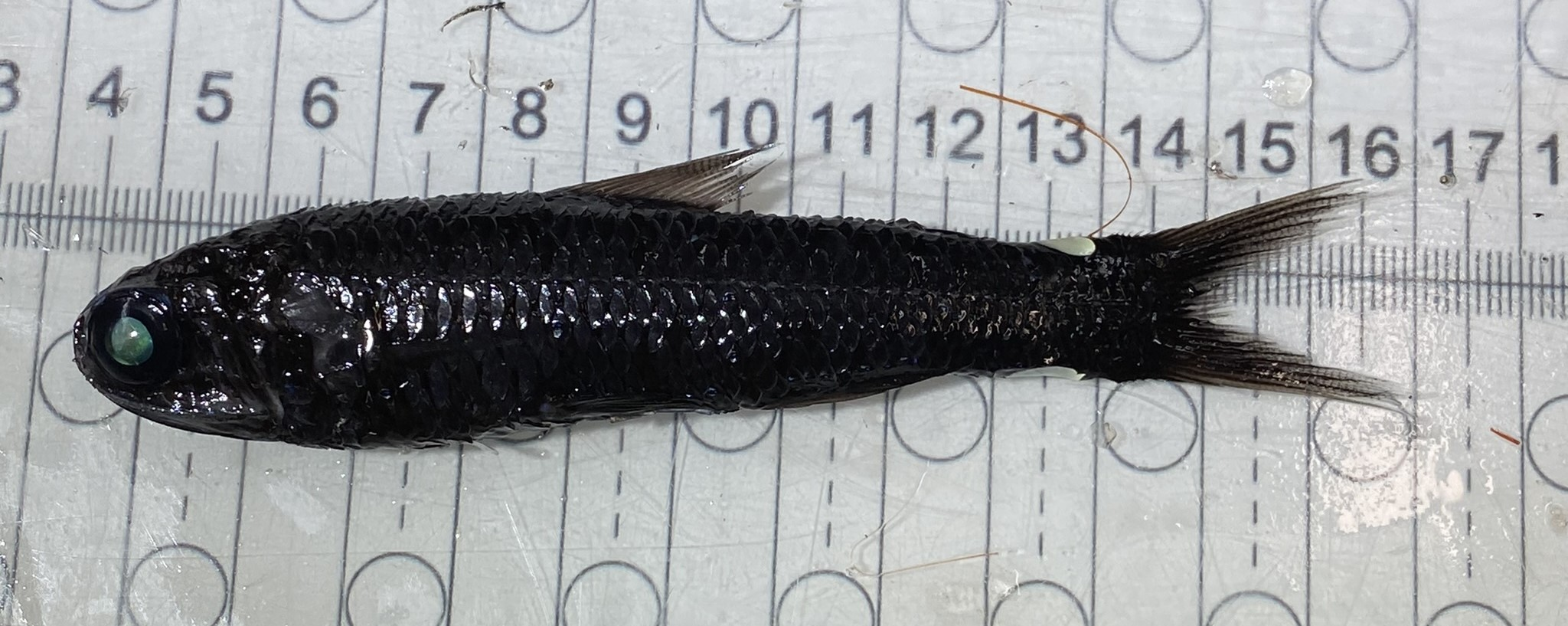
A freshly-caught specimen of Lampadena speculigera.

The body is elongate and glossy, purplish brown in colour. The maximum standard length is 15.3 cm (6.0 in). Specimens from the Mid-Atlantic Ridge had a mean weight of about 20 g (0.7 oz).

== Ecology ==
Lampadena speculigera undergo diel vertical migration and are found at depths of 475–950 m (1,558–3,117 ft) during the day and 60–750 m (200–2,460 ft) at night.

Lanternfishes in general are preyed upon by a range of fish, squid, seabirds, and mammals. Predators of Lampadena speculigera in particular include northern fulmars.
