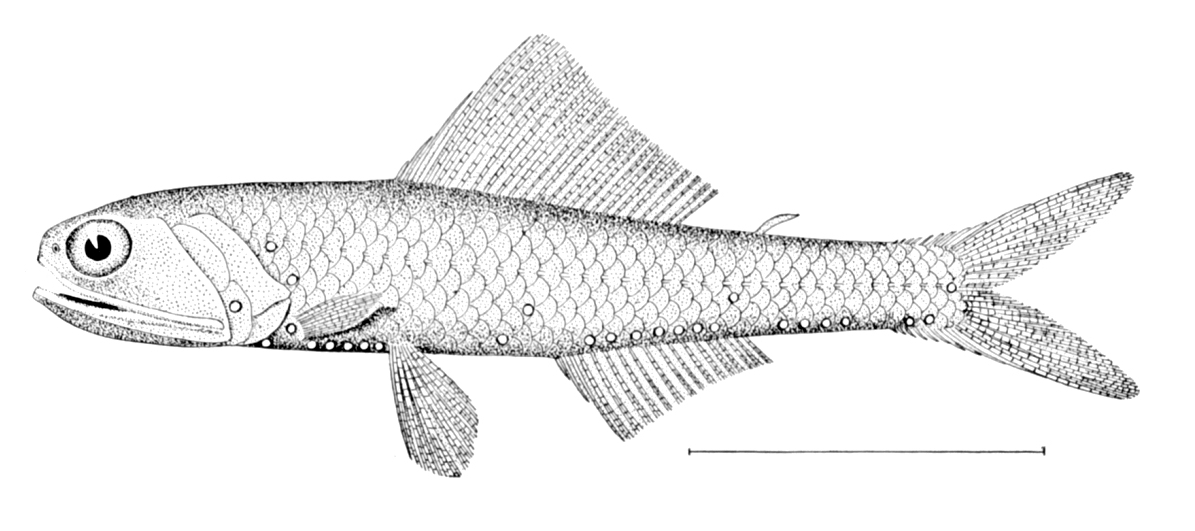

Conservation status
- Least Concern (IUCN 3.1)

Scientific classification
- Kingdom: Animalia
- Phylum: Chordata
- Class: Actinopterygii
- Order: Myctophiformes
- Family: Myctophidae
- Genus: Notoscopelus
- Species: N. caudispinosus

Binomial name
- Notoscopelus caudispinosus (Johnson, 1863)

Synonyms
- Lampanyctus caudospinosus (Johnson, 1863); Macrostoma caudospinosum (Johnson, 1863); Notoscopelus (Notoscopelus) caudispinosus (Johnson, 1863); Scopelus caudispinosus Johnson, 1863

= Notoscopelus caudispinosus =

Species of fish

Notoscopelus caudispinosus is a species of lanternfish in the family Myctophidae. It is found in the eastern and western Atlantic Ocean, the Indian Ocean and parts of the Pacific Ocean. It spends the day below 1,000 m (3,300 ft), rising towards the surface to feed at night.

== Description ==
Notoscopelus caudispinosus has a laterally compressed head and body with a maximum length of about 140 mm (5.5 in). The mouth is at the tip of the rounded snout and extends backwards to just behind the eye. The teeth are small. There are 24 to 27 soft rays in the dorsal fin, 19 to 21 in the anal fin and 11 to 13 in the pectoral fins. There are groups of photophores (small light organs) on the head and sides of the body. Above the caudal peduncle there is a row of eight to nine luminous scale-like segments in adult males, but male fish lack luminous organs above the eye and on the cheek. N. caudispinosus differs from closely related species in having fewer than 15 gill rakers.

== Distribution ==
This species has a wide oceanic distribution in deep water habitats. It is found in the eastern Atlantic Ocean between the equator and about 35°N, but is absent from the Gulf of Guinea and the upswelling region off the coast of Mauritania. It is also present in the western Atlantic, between about 39°S and 41°N, in the Caribbean Sea and the Gulf of Mexico, and in parts of the Indian and Pacific Oceans. It typically spends the day at depths greater than 1,000 m (3,300 ft), rising through the water column at night to feed in the top 175 m (570 ft), where it is most abundant between 60 and 125 m (200 and 410 ft).

== Status ==
N. caudispinosus faces no particular threats and has a widespread distribution, so the International Union for Conservation of Nature has rated it as being a least-concern species.
