= Acanthistius serratus =

Scientific classification
- Kingdom: Animalia
- Phylum: Chordata
- Class: Actinopterygii
- Order: Perciformes
- Family: Anthiadidae
- Genus: Acanthistius
- Species: A. serratus

Binomial name
- Acanthistius serratus (Cuvier, 1828)

Synonyms
- Plectropoma serratum Cuvier, 1828

Species of fish

Acanthistius serratus, also known as the western wirrah, is a species of ray-finned fish in the family Serranidae, the groupers and sea basses. The species is native to the Eastern Indian Ocean and is endemic to southern Australia, specifically Western Australia and South Australia.

The fish gets up to 50.0 centimetres (19.7 in) in length.
