= Acanthistius pictus =

Scientific classification
- Kingdom: Animalia
- Phylum: Chordata
- Class: Actinopterygii
- Order: Perciformes
- Family: Anthiadidae
- Genus: Acanthistius
- Species: A. pictus

Binomial name
- Acanthistius pictus (Tschudi, 1846)

Synonyms
- Plectropoma pictum Tschudi, 1846

Species of fish

Acanthistius pictus, also known as the brick seabass, is a species of ray-finned fish in the family Serranidae, the groupers and sea basses. The species is native to the Chile and Peru portion of the Eastern Pacific Ocean.

== Length ==
The fish gets up to 47.0 centimetres (18.5 in) in length.
