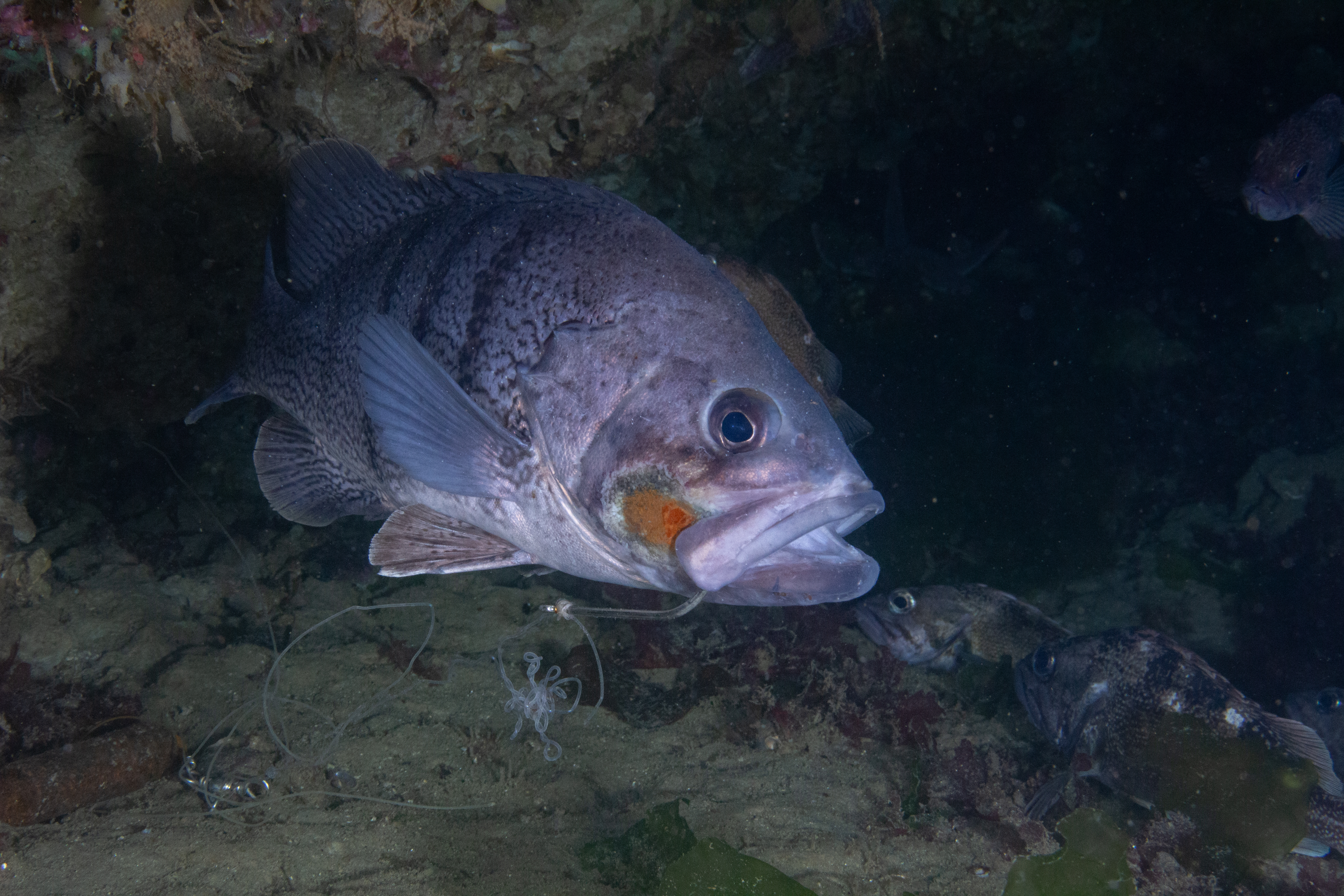

Scientific classification
- Kingdom: Animalia
- Phylum: Chordata
- Class: Actinopterygii
- Order: Perciformes
- Family: Anthiadidae
- Genus: Acanthistius
- Species: A. patachonicus

Binomial name
- Acanthistius patachonicus (Jenyns, 1840)

= Acanthistius patachonicus =

Species of fish

Acanthistius patachonicus is a species of ray-finned fish in the family Serranidae, the groupers and sea basses. The species can be found off central Argentina in the Southwest Atlantic.

The fish gets up to 31.0 centimetres (12.2 in) in length.
