= Diaphus megalops =

Conservation status
- Least Concern (IUCN 3.1)

Scientific classification
- Kingdom: Animalia
- Phylum: Chordata
- Class: Actinopterygii
- Order: Myctophiformes
- Family: Myctophidae
- Genus: Diaphus
- Species: D. megalops

Binomial name
- Diaphus megalops Nafpaktitis, 1978

Species of fish

Diaphus megalops is a species of lanternfish found in the Indo-west Pacific.

== Description ==
This species reaches a length of 8.5 cm (3.3 in).

== Etymology ==
The fish's name means large eyes.
