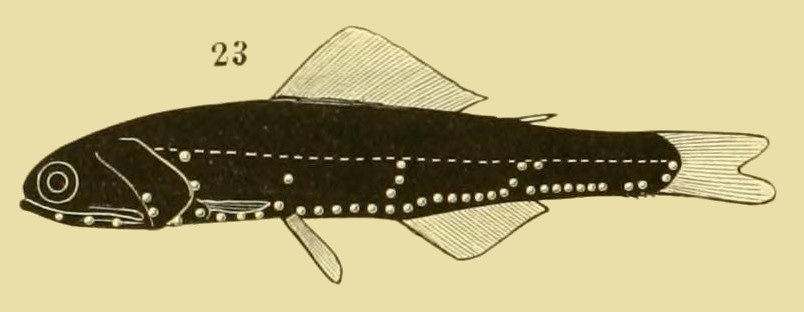

Conservation status
- Least Concern (IUCN 3.1)

Scientific classification
- Kingdom: Animalia
- Phylum: Chordata
- Class: Actinopterygii
- Order: Myctophiformes
- Family: Myctophidae
- Genus: Notoscopelus
- Species: N. elongatus

Binomial name
- Notoscopelus elongatus (Costa, 1844)

Synonyms
- Lampanyctus elongatus (Costa, 1844); Myctophum elongatum (Costa, 1844); Myctophum elongatus (Costa, 1844); Notoscopelus (Notoscopelus) elongatus (Costa, 1844); Scopelus elongatus Costa, 1844; Scopelus pseudocrocodilus Moreau, 1891

= Notoscopelus elongatus =

Species of fish

Notoscopelus elongatus is a species of lanternfish in the family Myctophidae. It is endemic to the Mediterranean Sea where it is found in deep water habitats, rising to near the surface to feed at night and descending to great depths by day. It is a common species with no particular threats, and the International Union for Conservation of Nature has listed its conservation status as being of least concern.

== Description ==
Notoscopelus elongatus is a fairly small lanternfish, growing to a maximum length of about 106 mm (4.2 in). The number of soft rays in the dorsal fin is 21 to 23, in the anal fin 18 to 19, and in the pectoral fins, 12 to 13. There is a distinctive arrangement of photophores (light-emitting organs) on the head and body. At a length of about 52 mm (2.0 in), males develop luminous, glandular patches on the dorsal surface of the caudal peduncle. It is very similar in morphology to Notoscopelus kroyeri but differs in having 23 to 25 gill rakers whereas N. kroyeri has 26 to 29.

== Distribution ==
N. elongatus is endemic to the Mediterranean Sea where it is found in greatest abundance in the Western Basin and the Ligurian Sea and Tyrrhenian Sea. During the day it occurs at depths between about 375 and 1,000 m (1,200 and 3,300 ft) and at night it makes a vertical migration and rises to 45 and 150 m (100 and 500 ft) to feed. The purpose of the daily migration is probably to feed at night in the plankton-rich surface waters but avoid predators during the day in the ocean depths. If the fish takes six to twelve hours to digest its food, this cycle of activity serves to transfer nutrients from surface waters to much greater depths.
