= Acanthistius pardalotus =

Scientific classification
- Kingdom: Animalia
- Phylum: Chordata
- Class: Actinopterygii
- Order: Perciformes
- Family: Anthiadidae
- Genus: Acanthistius
- Species: A. pardalotus

Binomial name
- Acanthistius pardalotus Hutchins, 1981

Species of fish

Acanthistius pardalotus, also known as the leopard wirrah, is a species of ray-finned fish in the family Serranidae, the groupers and sea basses. Found in the Eastern Indian Ocean, it is endemic to the west coast of Australia.

The fish gets up to 37.0 centimetres (14.6 in) in length.
