= Acanthistius joanae =

Scientific classification
- Kingdom: Animalia
- Phylum: Chordata
- Class: Actinopterygii
- Order: Perciformes
- Family: Anthiadidae
- Genus: Acanthistius
- Species: A. joanae

Binomial name
- Acanthistius joanae Heemstra, 2010

Species of fish

Acanthistius joanae, also known as the scalyjaw koester, is a species of ray-finned fish in the family Serranidae, the groupers and sea basses. The species is found along the shores of the Indian Ocean in South Africa.

== Length ==
The fish gets up to 14.0 centimetres (5.5 in) in length.

== Etymology ==
The fish is named in honor of Joan Wright, the assistant of Phil Heemstra, who initially discovered the fish. Heemstra had promised Joan in a note he had written that he would name the fish after her, however this was not done until after she had retired around 25 years later.
