= Diaphus diademophilus =

Conservation status
- Least Concern (IUCN 3.1)

Scientific classification
- Kingdom: Animalia
- Phylum: Chordata
- Class: Actinopterygii
- Order: Myctophiformes
- Family: Myctophidae
- Genus: Diaphus
- Species: D. diademophilus

Binomial name
- Diaphus diademophilus Nafpaktitis, 1978

Species of fish

Diaphus diademophilus is a species of lanternfish found in the Indo-West Pacific Ocean.

== Description ==
This species reaches a length of 4.9 cm (1.9 in).
