= Gnathophis heterolinea =

Conservation status
- Data Deficient (IUCN 3.1)

Scientific classification
- Kingdom: Animalia
- Phylum: Chordata
- Class: Actinopterygii
- Order: Anguilliformes
- Family: Congridae
- Genus: Gnathophis
- Species: G. heterolinea

Binomial name
- Gnathophis heterolinea (Kotthaus, 1968)

Synonyms
- Lemkea heterolinea Kotthaus, 1968

Species of fish

Gnathophis heterolinea is an eel in the family Congridae (conger/garden eels). It was described by Adolf Kotthaus in 1968, originally under the genus Lemkea. It is a tropical, marine eel which is known from Mombasa, Kenya, in the western Indian Ocean. It dwells at a depth range of 177–243 metres.
