= Gnathophis longicauda =

Conservation status
- Least Concern (IUCN 3.1)

Scientific classification
- Kingdom: Animalia
- Phylum: Chordata
- Class: Actinopterygii
- Division: Teleostei
- Order: Anguilliformes
- Family: Congridae
- Genus: Gnathophis
- Species: G. longicauda

Binomial name
- Gnathophis longicauda (Ramsay & Ogilby, 1888)

Synonyms
- Congromuraena longicauda Ramsay & Ogilby, 1888; Gnathophis longicaudus (Ramsay & Ogilby, 1888)

Species of fish

Gnathophis longicauda, the little conger, little conger eel or silver conger, is an eel in the family Congridae (conger/garden eels). It was described by Edward Pierson Ramsay and James Douglas Ogilby in 1888, originally under the genus Congromuraena. It is a marine, temperate water-dwelling eel which is endemic to Australia, in the Indo-West Pacific. It dwells at a depth range of 2–99 metres, and inhabits the continental shelf and slope.
