= Acanthistius fuscus =

Rapanui seabass

Scientific classification
- Kingdom: Animalia
- Phylum: Chordata
- Class: Actinopterygii
- Order: Perciformes
- Family: Anthiadidae
- Genus: Acanthistius
- Species: A. fuscus

Binomial name
- Acanthistius fuscus Regan, 1913

Species of fish

Acanthistius fuscus, also known as the Rapanui seabass, is a species of ray-finned fish in the family Serranidae, the groupers and sea basses. The species is native to the Southeast Pacific Ocean around Easter Island and Sala y Gómez.
