= Diaphus meadi =

Conservation status
- Least Concern (IUCN 3.1)

Scientific classification
- Kingdom: Animalia
- Phylum: Chordata
- Class: Actinopterygii
- Order: Myctophiformes
- Family: Myctophidae
- Genus: Diaphus
- Species: D. meadi

Binomial name
- Diaphus meadi Nafpaktitis, 1978

Species of fish

Diaphus meadi, also known as Mead's lanternfish, is a species of lanternfish that is found almost worldwide.

== Description ==
This species reaches a length of 5.4 cm (2.1 in).

== Etymology ==
The fish is named in honor of ichthyologist Giles W. Mead, who as cruise leader on the Anton Bruun cruises, six to the Indian Ocean and thirteen to the eastern South Pacific, was largely responsible for much of the material reported on by the author.
