= Diaphus arabicus =

Conservation status
- Least Concern (IUCN 3.1)

Scientific classification
- Kingdom: Animalia
- Phylum: Chordata
- Class: Actinopterygii
- Order: Myctophiformes
- Family: Myctophidae
- Genus: Diaphus
- Species: D. arabicus

Binomial name
- Diaphus arabicus Nafpaktitis, 1978

Species of fish

Diaphus arabicus is a species of lanternfish found in the western Indian Ocean and the Arabian Sea.
