= Diaphus knappi =

Conservation status
- Least Concern (IUCN 3.1)

Scientific classification
- Kingdom: Animalia
- Phylum: Chordata
- Class: Actinopterygii
- Order: Myctophiformes
- Family: Myctophidae
- Genus: Diaphus
- Species: D. knappi

Binomial name
- Diaphus knappi Nafpaktitis, 1978

Species of fish

Diaphus knappi, the small lanternfish, is a species of lanternfish found in the Indo-Pacific Ocean.

== Description ==
This species reaches a length of 17.3 cm (6.8 in).

== Etymology ==
The fish is named in honor of Smithsonian ichthyologist Leslie W. Knapp (1929–2017), for providing the author with lanternfishes from both the Indian Ocean and Pacific Ocean.
