= Gnathophis codoniphorus =

Conservation status
- Data Deficient (IUCN 3.1)

Scientific classification
- Kingdom: Animalia
- Phylum: Chordata
- Class: Actinopterygii
- Order: Anguilliformes
- Family: Congridae
- Genus: Gnathophis
- Species: G. codoniphorus

Binomial name
- Gnathophis codoniphorus Maul, 1972

Species of fish

Gnathophis codoniphorus is an eel in the family Congridae (conger/garden eels). It was described by Günther Maul in 1972. It is a marine, deep water-dwelling eel which is known from the Azorean slope at the Great Meteor Seamount, in the northeastern Atlantic Ocean. It dwells at a depth range of 300–304 metres (984–997 ft).
