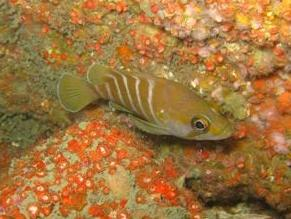
- Argentine seabass near the Ilhas Cagarras, Brazil

Conservation status
- Data Deficient (IUCN 3.1)

Scientific classification
- Kingdom: Animalia
- Phylum: Chordata
- Class: Actinopterygii
- Order: Perciformes
- Family: Anthiadidae
- Genus: Acanthistius
- Species: A. brasilianus

Binomial name
- Acanthistius brasilianus (Cuvier, 1828)

Synonyms
- Plectropoma brasilianum (Cuvier, 1828); Plectropoma patachonica (questionable) (Jenyns, 1840)

= Argentine seabass =

Species of fish

The Argentine seabass (Acanthistius brasilianus) is a species of seabass in the family Serranidae. It occurs on the South American continental shelf of the western Atlantic Ocean, where it used to be caught commercially for human consumption.

== Taxonomy and naming ==
The Argentine seabass was first described by Georges Cuvier as part of his 22-volume work Histoire naturelle des poissons, which he wrote with Achille Valenciennes from 1828 to 1849. He originally named it Plectropoma brasilianum, though it is now considered a synonym of Acanthistius brasilianus. As a result of his participation in first voyage of HMS Beagle, Leonard Jenyns described a fish in 1840 that he named Plectropoma patachonica, and while many of the fishes he observed may have also been Argentine seabass, it is not totally clear whether P. patachonica is a true synonym of A. brasilianus.

=== Etymology ===
The Argentine seabass' genus name, Acanthistius, comes from the Greek akantha (ακανθα), meaning thorn and Greek, istio (ιστίο) meaning sail, which is in reference to the spines along the front of its dorsal fin. The species name, brasilianus, means "Brazilian". This is a reference to where the first specimens to be reported were caught.

== Description ==
The Argentine seabass has a deep, compressed body and is covered in ctenoid scales, which are typical in teleost fishes. The dorsal profile is evenly arched and this arch is traced by the shape of the lateral line, which is covered by between 84 and 98 scales and runs from the upper margin of the operculum to the base of the caudal fin. The Argentine seabass' dorsal fin has 13 spines and 15 soft rays, while its anal fin has only 3 spines and 8 rays. They generally reach maturity when around 29 centimetres (11 in) in length though they have been recorded to lengths of 60 centimetres (24 in). Individuals may weigh as much as 2.5–3 kilograms (5.5–6.6 lb).

== Distribution and habitat ==
The Argentine seabass is a rare species, found only in the southwestern Atlantic Ocean, along the coasts of Argentina, Uruguay, and Brazil. They generally inhabit cold waters along the South American continental shelf, but also form a component of some subtropical reef communities, especially rocky reefs and outcrops. Typically marine (they may be rarely encountered in brackish waters), Argentine seabass have been reported at depths from 15 metres (49 ft) to 60 metres (200 ft).

Argentine seabass are known to prey upon crabs and small fish. They are in turn eaten by predators such as the Imperial shag.

== Relationship with humans ==
Argentine seabass are consumed by humans, typically being caught off Argentina and, to a lesser extent, Uruguay. Their meat is generally marketed fresh, frozen or filleted, and 10,000–15,000 tonnes (9,800–14,800 long tons; 11,000–17,000 short tons) were caught annually in the early 2000s. It is not known whether the Argentine seabass is experiencing any major environmental threats, and the overall population trend for this species is unknown. It is classified as Data Deficient by the IUCN.

There are no special regulations concerning the Argentine seabass, though the best harvesting season is from August to March. The species also occurs in a number of marine protected areas. In addition to commercial fishery, the Argentine seabass is also caught by anglers and is typically eaten fried or grilled.
