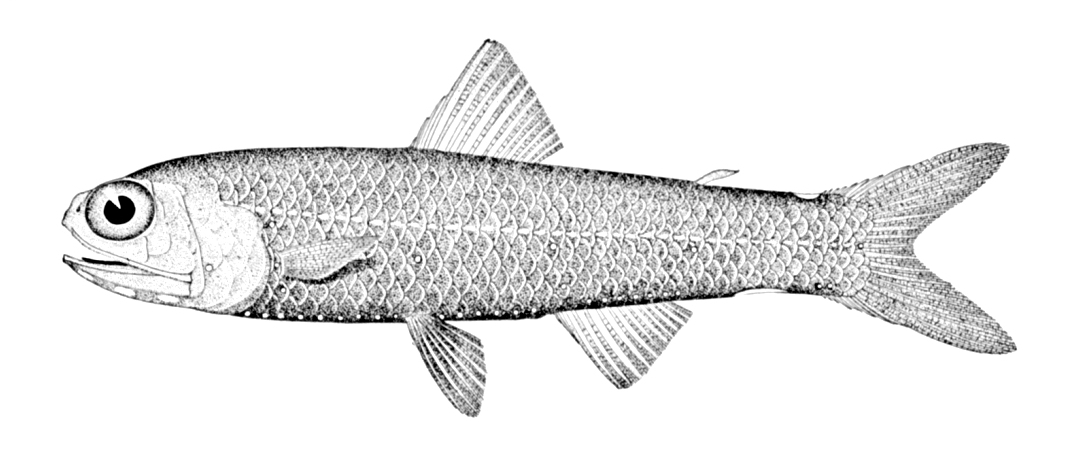
- Mirror lanternfish (L. speculigera)

Scientific classification
- Kingdom: Animalia
- Phylum: Chordata
- Class: Actinopterygii
- Order: Myctophiformes
- Family: Myctophidae
- Subfamily: Lampanyctinae
- Genus: Lampadena; Goode & T. H. Bean, 1893

= Lampadena =

Genus of fishes

Lampadena is a genus of lanternfishes.

== Species ==
There are currently nine recognized species in this genus:

- Lampadena anomala A. E. Parr, 1928
- Lampadena chavesi Collett, 1905 (Chaves' lanternfish)
- Lampadena dea Fraser-Brunner, 1949
- Lampadena luminosa (Garman, 1899) (Luminous lanternfish)
- Lampadena notialis B. G. Nafpaktitis & Paxton, 1968 (Notal lanternfish)
- Lampadena pontifex G. Krefft, 1970
- Lampadena speculigera Goode & T. H. Bean, 1896 (Mirror lanternfish)
- Lampadena urophaos Paxton, 1963
  - Lampadena urophaos atlantica Maul, 1969
  - Lampadena urophaos urophaos Paxton, 1963 (Sunbeam lampfish)
- Lampadena yaquinae (Coleman & B. G. Nafpaktitis, 1972)
