= Acanthistius paxtoni =

Scientific classification
- Kingdom: Animalia
- Phylum: Chordata
- Class: Actinopterygii
- Order: Perciformes
- Family: Anthiadidae
- Genus: Acanthistius
- Species: A. paxtoni

Binomial name
- Acanthistius paxtoni Hutchins & Kuiter, 1982

Species of fish

Acanthistius paxtoni, also known as the orangelined wirra, is a species of ray-finned fish in the family Serranidae, the groupers and sea basses. The species is native to the southwestern portion of the Pacific Ocean and is found New South Wales, Australia.

== Length ==
The fish gets up to 25.8 centimetres (10.2 in) in length.

== Etymology ==
The fish is named in honor of John R. Paxton of the Australian Museum in Sydney, because of his contributions to Australian ichthyology.
