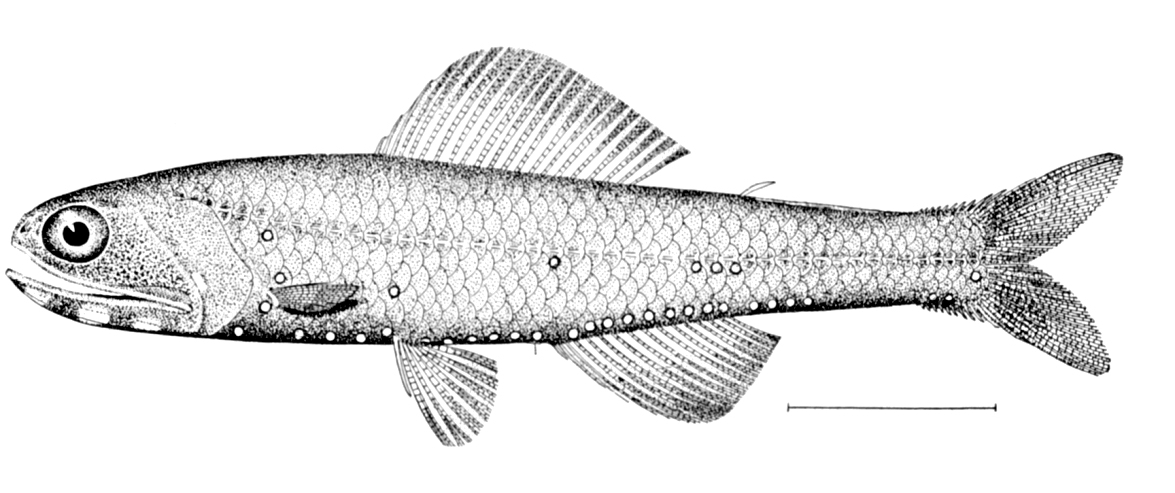
- Lancet fish (N. kroyeri)
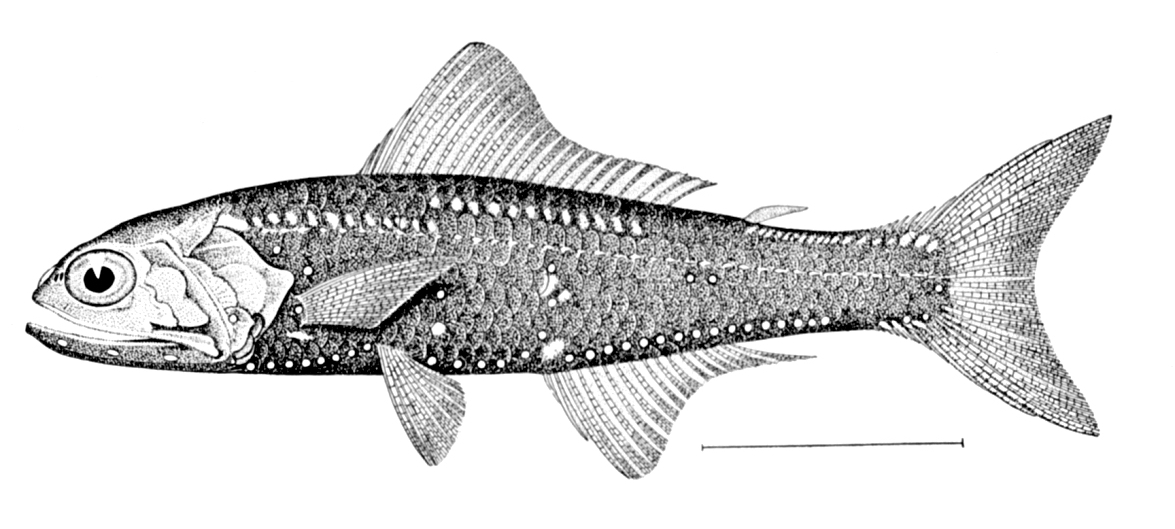
- Patchwork lampfish (N. resplendens)

Scientific classification
- Domain: Eukaryota
- Kingdom: Animalia
- Phylum: Chordata
- Class: Actinopterygii
- Order: Myctophiformes
- Family: Myctophidae
- Genus: Notoscopelus; Günther, 1864

= Notoscopelus =

Genus of fishes

Notoscopelus is a genus of lanternfishes.

== Species ==
There are currently six recognized species in this genus:

- Notoscopelus bolini B. G. Nafpaktitis, 1975
- Notoscopelus caudispinosus (J. Y. Johnson, 1863) (Spinetail lanternfish)
- Notoscopelus elongatus (O. G. Costa, 1844)
- Notoscopelus japonicus (S. Tanaka (I), 1908) (Japanese lanternfish)
- Notoscopelus kroyeri (Malm, 1861) (Lancet fish)
- Notoscopelus resplendens (J. Richardson, 1845) (Patchwork lampfish)
