= Diaphus bertelseni =

Conservation status
- Least Concern (IUCN 3.1)

Scientific classification
- Kingdom: Animalia
- Phylum: Chordata
- Class: Actinopterygii
- Division: Teleostei
- Order: Myctophiformes
- Family: Myctophidae
- Genus: Diaphus
- Species: D. bertelseni

Binomial name
- Diaphus bertelseni Nafpaktitis, 1966

Species of lanternfish

Holotype site (MCZ 43121): central Atlantic Ocean

Diaphus bertelseni, or Bertelsen's lanternfish, is a species of oceanodromous lanternfish, first described in 1966 by Basil Nafpaktitis.

== Etymology ==
The species epithet, bertelseni, honours the Danish ichthyologist, Erik Bertelsen.

== Habitat and distribution ==
Diaphus bertelseni lives in the Eastern Atlantic, Western Atlantic, Southwest Pacific, and Eastern Pacific at depths up to 300 meters. They are mostly at 200 to 300 meters deep during the day, and 60 to 175 meters deep at night.

== Description ==
Diaphus bertelseni grows to a length of 9.1 cm, and can have up to 15 dorsal fins, 15 anal fins, 8 pelvic fins, 18 gill rakers, and 35 lateral lines. Their coloring is dark with paler photophores.
