= Gnathophis parini =

Conservation status
- Least Concern (IUCN 3.1)

Scientific classification
- Kingdom: Animalia
- Phylum: Chordata
- Class: Actinopterygii
- Order: Anguilliformes
- Family: Congridae
- Genus: Gnathophis
- Species: G. parini

Binomial name
- Gnathophis parini Karmovskaya, 1990

Synonyms
- Gnatophis parini Karmovskaya, 1990 (misspelling)

Species of fish

Gnathophis parini is an eel in the family Congridae (conger/garden eels). It was described by Emma Stanislavovna Karmovskaya in 1990. It is a marine, deep water-dwelling eel which is known from the Sala y Gomez Ridge, in the southeastern Pacific Ocean. It dwells at a depth range of 540–560 metres. The maximum known total length, based on a juvenile specimen, is 13.7 centimetres.

The species epithet "parini" refers to N.V. Parin.
