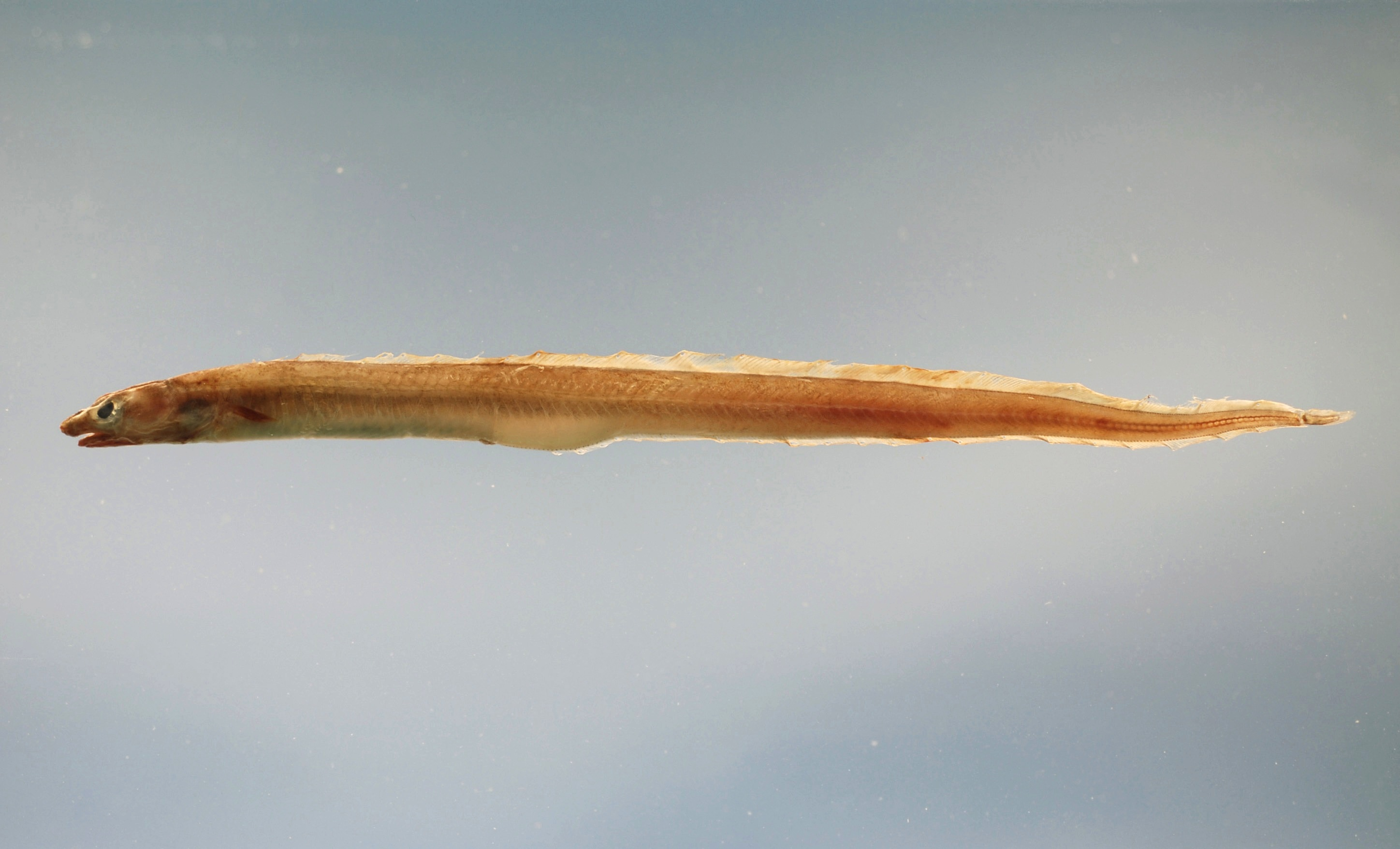

Conservation status
- Least Concern (IUCN 3.1)

Scientific classification
- Kingdom: Animalia
- Phylum: Chordata
- Class: Actinopterygii
- Order: Anguilliformes
- Family: Congridae
- Genus: Gnathophis
- Species: G. umbrellabius

Binomial name
- Gnathophis umbrellabius Kaup, 1856

= Gnathophis umbrellabius =

Species of fish

Gnathophis umbrellabius, also known as umbrella fish, is a type of conger fish of the family Congridae, found on soft bottoms of the continental shelf of the southwest Pacific Ocean. Length is up to 45 cm (18 in).
