= Diaphus roei =

Conservation status
- Least Concern (IUCN 3.1)

Scientific classification
- Kingdom: Animalia
- Phylum: Chordata
- Class: Actinopterygii
- Order: Myctophiformes
- Family: Myctophidae
- Genus: Diaphus
- Species: D. roei

Binomial name
- Diaphus roei Nafpaktitis, 1974

Species of fish

Diaphus roei, the small lanternfish, is a species of lanternfish found in the Philippines and the western-central Atlantic Ocean.

== Etymology ==
The fish is named in honor of Richard N. Roe (1936–2016), of the US National Marine Fisheries Service (NMFS), Southeast Fisheries Center, in Pascagoula, Mississippi, who obtained specimens collected from the NMFS research vessel Oregon.
