= Gnathophis musteliceps =

Conservation status
- Least Concern (IUCN 3.1)

Scientific classification
- Kingdom: Animalia
- Phylum: Chordata
- Class: Actinopterygii
- Order: Anguilliformes
- Family: Congridae
- Genus: Gnathophis
- Species: G. musteliceps

Binomial name
- Gnathophis musteliceps (Alcock, 1894)

Synonyms
- Congromuraena musteliceps Alcock, 1894; Bathycongrus musteliceps (Alcock, 1894)

Species of fish

Gnathophis musteliceps is an eel in the family Congridae (conger/garden eels). It was described by Alfred William Alcock in 1894, originally under the genus Congromuraena. It is a marine, deep water-dwelling eel which is known from the Bay of Bengal, in the western Indian Ocean. It dwells at a depth range of 265–457 metres.
