= Gnathophis smithi =

Conservation status
- Least Concern (IUCN 3.1)

Scientific classification
- Kingdom: Animalia
- Phylum: Chordata
- Class: Actinopterygii
- Order: Anguilliformes
- Family: Congridae
- Genus: Gnathophis
- Species: G. smithi

Binomial name
- Gnathophis smithi Karmovskaya, 1990

Synonyms
- Gnatophis smithi Karmovskaya, 1990 (misspelling)

Species of fish

Gnathophis smithi is an eel in the family Congridae (conger/garden eels). It was described by Emma Stanislavovna Karmovskaya in 1990. It is a subtropical, marine eel which is known from the Nazca and Sala y Gómez ridges, in the southeastern Pacific Ocean. It dwells at a depth range of 145–250 metres, and leads a nocturnal lifestyle. Males can reach a maximum total length of 41.1 centimetres. The eel's diet includes benthic crustaceans and polychaetes.

The species epithet refers to David G. Smith, noted for specializing in the study of eels.
