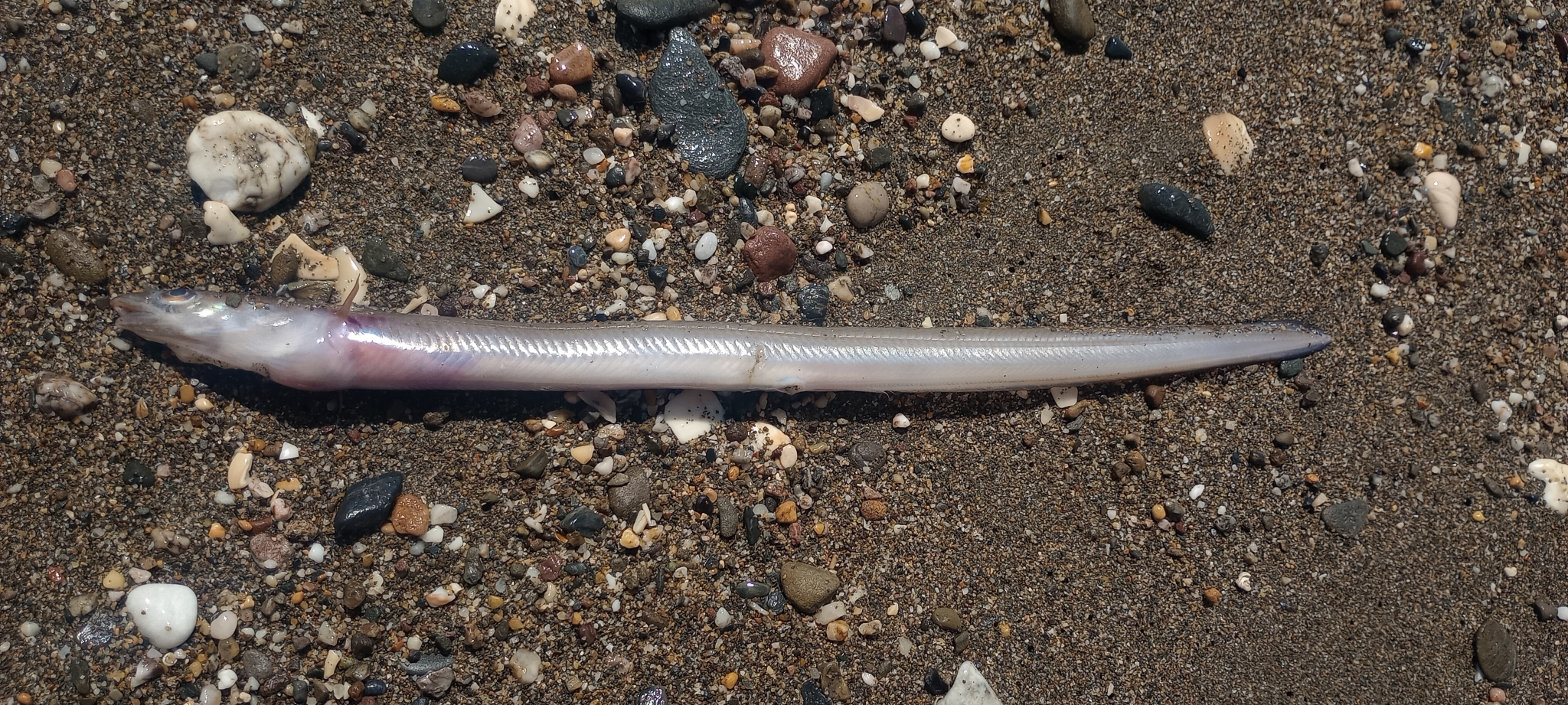

Conservation status
- Least Concern (IUCN 3.1)

Scientific classification
- Kingdom: Animalia
- Phylum: Chordata
- Class: Actinopterygii
- Order: Anguilliformes
- Family: Congridae
- Genus: Gnathophis
- Species: G. mystax

Binomial name
- Gnathophis mystax (Delaroche, 1809)

Synonyms
- Muraena mystax Delaroche, 1809; Ariosoma mystax (Delaroche, 1809); Bathycongrus mystax (Delaroche, 1809); Conger mystax (Delaroche, 1809); Congermuraena mystax (Delaroche, 1809); Congromuraena mystax (Delaroche, 1809) (misspelling)

= Gnathophis mystax =

Species of fish

Gnathophis mystax, the thinlip conger or blacktailed conger, is an eel in the family Congridae (conger/garden eels). It was described by François Étienne Delaroche in 1809, originally under the genus Muraena. It is a subtropical, marine eel which is known from the eastern Atlantic Ocean, including southern Portugal, the Mediterranean, and Morocco. It dwells at a depth range of 75–800 metres, and inhabits mud and sand on the continental slope. Males can reach a maximum total length of 60 centimetres (2 ft 0 in), but more commonly reach a TL of 35 centimetres (1 ft 2 in).

The thinlip conger feeds on crustaceans including crabs such as Goneplax rhomboides, shrimp and prawns such as Alpheus glaber, Calocaris macandreae, Processa canaliculata, and mysids. It also feeds on polychaetes, bony fish and other invertebrates. Spawning occurs between August and October.

The thinlip conger is sometimes harvested by fisheries.
