= John Paxton (ichthyologist) =

Australian ichthyologist

John Richard Paxton
- Born: January 16, 1938
- Died: October 29, 2023 (aged 85)
- Education: University of Southern California
- Known for: Curator of the Australian Museum's fish collection; President of Australian Society for Fish Biology
- Spouse: Hannelore Paxton
- Awards: K. Radway Allen Award
- Scientific career
- Thesis: Evolution In The Oceanic Midwaters: Comparative Osteology And Relationships Of The Lanternfishes (Family Myctophidae) (1968)
- Doctoral advisor: Jay Savage

John Richard Paxton (16 January 1938 – 29 October 2023) was a United States-born Australian ichthyologist, who spent most of his career at the Australian Museum. He had a particular research interest in lanternfishes (family Myctophidae) and other deep-sea fishes. Paxton was a founding member of the Australian Society for Fish Biology and received the society's K. Radway Allen Award in 1997.

== Early life ==
John Richard Paxton was born in 1938 and grew up in Los Angeles, California. He completed his undergraduate and postgraduate studies at the University of Southern California, beginning with a BA in Zoology (1960) and an MSc in Biology (1965). His master's research investigated the ecology and vertical distribution of lanternfishes (family Myctophidae) in a deep-sea basin off southern California. Paxton completed his PhD under supervisor Jay Savage, on the osteology and evolutionary history of lanternfishes, and graduated in 1968.

== Career ==
Paxton spent most of his career at the Australian Museum in Sydney, Australia. He arrived in February 1968 as the museum's Curator of Fishes. Over the next 30 years, Paxton increased the size of the Australian Museum's fish collection from 80,000 specimens to more than 1 million. This created the third-largest marine fish collection in the world, and the largest in Australia. Paxton attributes the growth of the fish collection to a number of factors, including increases in personnel, new collecting techniques, increased exploratory fishing by fisheries vessels, and a more efficient collections registration system. In 1997, the Australian Museum fish collection included more than 450,000 registered juvenile or adult specimens and more than 500,000 larval specimens.

In 1981, Paxton and colleague Doug Hoese founded the Indo-Pacific Fish Conference, which has since run every four years. Paxton retired in 1998, but remained active at the museum as a research fellow (1998–2006), senior research fellow (2006–07) and senior fellow (2007–present).

== Australian Society for Fish Biology ==
Paxton was a founding member of the Australian Society for Fish Biology and a frequent attendee of the society's annual conferences. He served as the society's second President from 1976 to 1977, and was made an honorary life member in 1991. In 1997, Paxton was awarded the K. Radway Allen Award for his contributions to Australian fish research.

== Legacy ==
Paxton taught an ichthyology course at Macquarie University in the 1970s, and supervised one honours, three MSc and four PhD students. He published more than 100 scientific papers, as well as two editions of the major reference text, Encyclopaedia of Fishes.

== Taxon described by him ==
As of 2013, he had described 16 new species and nine new genera.

- See Category:Taxa named by John Richard Paxton

== Taxon named in his honor ==
Eighteen species and one genus have been named in his honour.

- Acanthistius paxtoni Hutchins & Kuiter, 1982
- Paxton's tilefish Branchiostegus paxtoni Dooley & Kailola, 1988.
- Careproctus paxtoni Stein, Chernova & Andriashev 2001
- Conocara paxtoni Sazonov, Williams & Kobyliansky 2009
- Corythoichthys paxtoni' Dawson, 1977, commonly known as Paxton's pipefish, is a species of marine fish of the family Syngnathidae. It is endemic to the Coral Sea, being found in the Great Barrier Reef, the Chesterfield Islands, and New Caledonia.
- Eustomias paxtoni Clarke 2001
- Gigantactis paxtoni Bertelsen, Pietsch & Lavenberg 1981
- Nettenchelys paxtoni Karmovskaya 1999
- Ostracoberyx paxtoni Quéro & Ozouf-Costaz 1991
- Photonectes paxtoni Flynn & Klepadlo 2012
- Polyipnus paxtoni Harold 1989
- Setipinna paxtoni Wongratana 1987
- Torquigener paxtoni Hardy 1983
- Ventrifossa paxtoni Iwamoto & A. Williams, 1999 (Thinbarbel whiptail)
- Ventrifossa johnboborum Iwamoto, 1982 (Snoutscale whiptail)
