= Cleaning symbiosis =

Mutually beneficial association between individuals of two species

Cleaning symbiosis

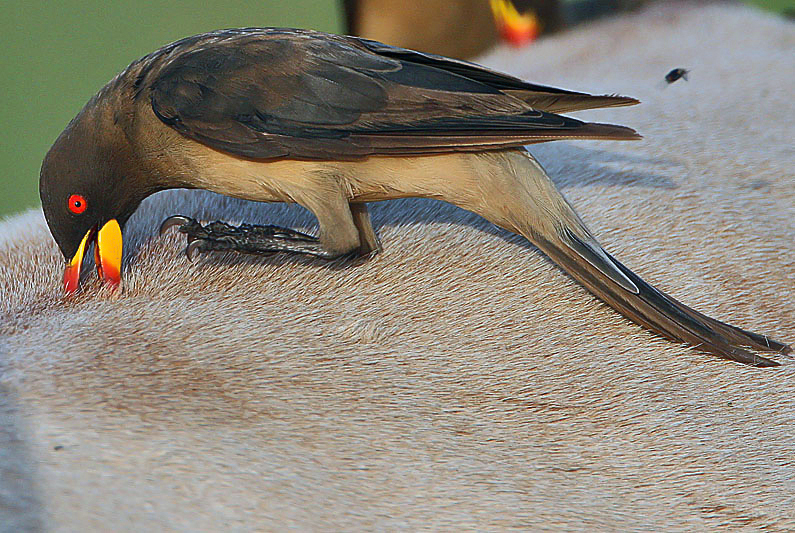
Cleaning behaviour of yellow-billed oxpecker (Buphagus africanus) on the back of a large mammal

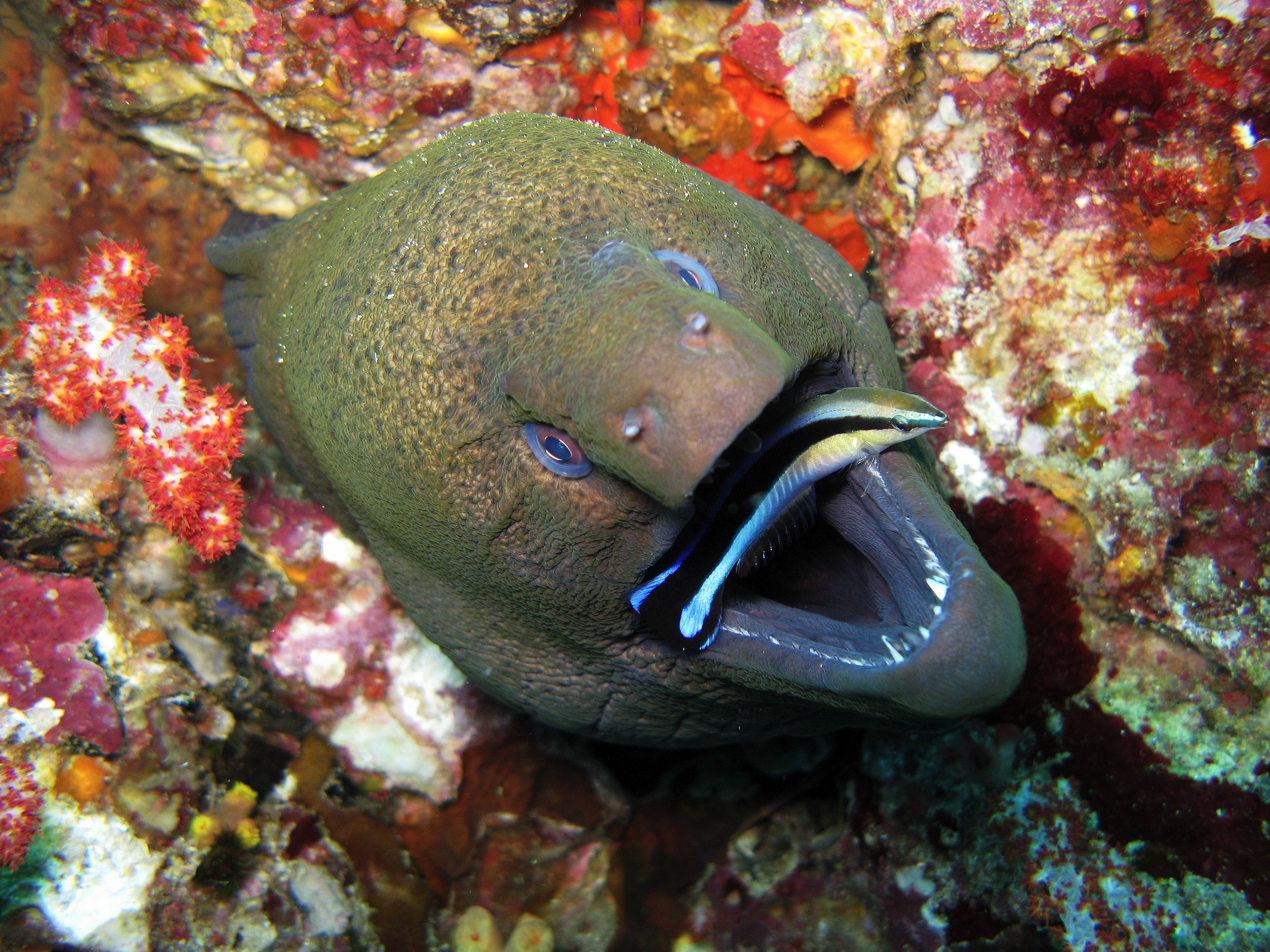
Giant moray eel being cleaned by a bluestreak cleaner wrasse

Cleaning symbiosis is a mutually beneficial association between individuals of two species, where one (the cleaner) removes and eats parasites and other materials from the surface of the other (the client). Cleaning symbiosis is well known among marine fish, where some small species of cleaner fish, notably wrasses but also species in other genera, are specialised to feed almost exclusively by cleaning larger fish and other marine animals. Other cleaning symbioses exist between birds and mammals, and in other groups.

Cleaning behaviour was first described by the Greek historian Herodotus in about 420 BCE, though his example (birds serving crocodiles) appears to occur only rarely.

The role of cleaning symbioses has been debated by biologists for over thirty years. Some believe that cleaning represents selfless co-operation, essentially pure mutualism, increasing the fitness of both individuals. Others such as Robert Trivers hold that it illustrates mutual selfishness, reciprocal altruism. Others again believe that cleaning behaviour is simply one-sided exploitation, a form of parasitism.

Cheating, where either a cleaner sometimes harms its client, or a predatory species mimics a cleaner, also occurs. Predatory cheating is analogous to Batesian mimicry, as where a harmless hoverfly mimics a stinging wasp, though with the tables turned. Some genuine cleaner fish, such as gobies and wrasse, have the same colours and patterns, in an example of convergent evolution. Mutual resemblance among cleaner fish is analogous to Müllerian mimicry, as where stinging bees and wasps mimic each other.

== History ==
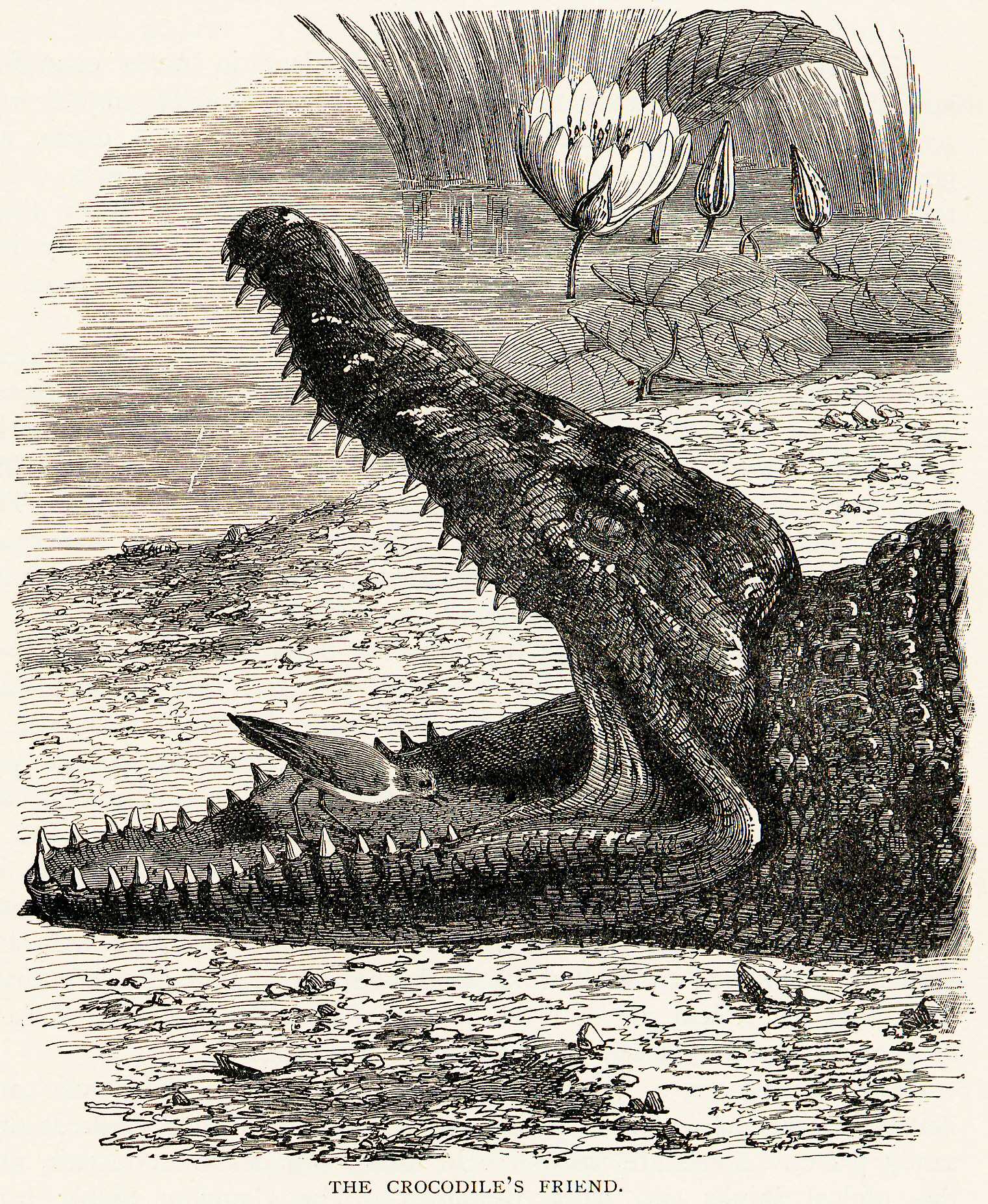
Herodotus asserted that the trochilus bird, possibly a sandpiper, was able to enter the mouth of the Nile crocodile in what would now be called a cleaning symbiosis. Drawing by Henry Scherren, 1906

In his Histories (book II), the ancient Greek historian Herodotus wrote:

As [the crocodile] lives chiefly in the river, it has the inside of its mouth constantly covered with leeches; hence it happens that, while all the other birds and beasts avoid it, with the trochilus it lives at peace, since it owes much to that bird: for the crocodile, when he leaves the water and comes out upon the land, is in the habit of lying with his mouth wide open, facing the western breeze: at such times the trochilus goes into his mouth and devours the leeches. This benefits the crocodile, who is pleased, and takes care not to hurt the trochilus.

Herodotus thus claimed (c. 440 BCE) that Nile crocodiles had what would now be called a cleaning symbiosis with the bird he called the trochilus, possibly a sandpiper. In 1906 Henry Scherren quoted John Mason Cook, son of travel agent Thomas Cook, as reporting from Egypt that he had seen some spur-winged plovers approach a crocodile, which opened its jaws for them:

Mr. J. M. Cook, of the celebrated tourist agency, when in Egypt in 1876, "watched one of these birds, and saw it deliberately go up to a crocodile, apparently asleep, which opened its jaws. The bird hopped in, and the crocodile closed its jaws. in what appeared to be a very short time, probably not more than a minute or two, the crocodile opened its jaws, and we saw the bird go down to the water's edge." There were several of these birds about, and Mr. Cook shot two of them, which Dr. Sclater identified as Spur-winged Plovers; so that the question as to what bird enters the mouth of the crocodile is now set at rest.

MacFarland and Reeder, reviewing the evidence, found that

Extensive observations of Nile crocodiles in regular or occasional association with various species of potential cleaners (e.g. plovers, sandpipers, water dikkop) ... have resulted in only a few reports of sandpipers removing leeches from the mouth and gular scutes and snapping at insects along the reptile's body.

== A disputed relationship ==
Cleaning symbiosis is a relationship between a pair of animals of different species, involving the removal and subsequent ingestion of ectoparasites, diseased and injured tissue, and unwanted food items from the surface of the host organism (the client) by the cleaning organism (the cleaner). Its status has been debated by biologists, with viewpoints ranging from pure mutualism to a form of exploitative parasitism by the cleaner.

Marine biologist Alexandra Grutter explains:

Cleaning associations involve cleaner organisms that remove ectoparasites and other material, such as mucus, scales and skin, from the body surfaces of other apparently co-operating animals. The latter are often referred to as hosts, customers, or clients. Cleaning behaviour is one of the most highly developed inter-specific communication systems known, with clients striking elaborate postures which have generally been assumed to make ectoparasites more accessible to cleaners.

=== Selfless co-operation ===
Grutter and her colleague Robert Poulin, reviewing over thirty years of debate by biologists on cleaning symbioses, argue that "Cleaning symbioses may not be mutualistic associations but rather one-sided exploitation. However, one must then ask why no counter-adaptation has evolved in clients to free them from this exploitation. If clients are the puppets of cleaners, then the fitness consequences of being exploited must be small". They quote as an example of an early position, C. Limbaugh writing in 1961: "From the standpoint of the philosopher of biology, the extent of cleaning behavior in the ocean emphasizes the role of co-operation in nature as opposed to the tooth-and-claw struggle for existence".

=== Mutual selfishness ===
In 1971, mathematical biologist Robert Trivers wrote more carefully "Cleaner organisms and their hosts meet the preconditions for the evolution of reciprocally altruistic behavior. The host's altruism is to be explained as benefiting him because of the advantage of being able quickly and repeatedly to return to the same cleaner" (i.e. mutual selfishness).

=== One-sided exploitation ===
By 1987, the behavioural ecologist George S. Losey wrote less optimistically "Cleaners are nothing but very clever behavioral parasites ... that have taken advantage of the rewarding aspects of tactile stimulation, found in nearly all vertebrates." Poulin and Grutter remark that "Over the last few decades, ... the opinion of scientists regarding cleaning symbioses has changed, from selfless cooperation, to a mutually beneficial interaction, and finally to a one-sided exploitation."

== Biological range ==
Cleaning symbiosis is known from several groups of animals both in the sea and on land (see table). Cleaners include fish, shrimps and birds; clients include a much wider range of fish, marine reptiles including turtles and iguanas, octopus, whales, and terrestrial mammals. Cleaning symbioses with reptile clients include fish cleaning the teeth of American crocodiles (Crocodylus acutus), geckos eating mosquitoes on Aldabra giant tortoises (Geochelone gigantea) and scarlet crabs (Grapsus grapsus), and three species of Galapagos finches removing ticks from marine iguanas (Amblyrhynchus cristatus).

Examples of cleaning symbioses in different groups of animals
| Habitat | Cleaner | Description | Client | Image |
|---|---|---|---|---|
| Freshwater lakes and streams | Crayfish worms (Branchiobdellida) | Leech-like worms live on crayfish and feed on microorganisms that colonize crayfish gills and exoskeleton | Crayfish | |
| Indian Ocean coral reefs | Cleaner wrasse (Labroides) | Small, longitudinally-striped, with blue; eats only ectoparasites at 'cleaning stations' | Larger fish e.g. puffers, sweetlips, groupers | |
| Western Atlantic coral reefs | Cleaning gobies (Elacatinus) | Different species small, longitudinally-striped, with blue, showing convergent evolution; eat ectoparasites but also small prey | Larger fish | |
| Brackish water, South Asia | Cichlid fish, orange chromide (Pseudetroplus maculatus) | Eats ectoparasites; preys on eggs, larvae | Cichlid fish, green chromide (Etroplus suratensis) | |
| Freshwater, Amazon basin | Juvenile striped Raphael catfish (Platydoras armatulus) | Only juvenile is strongly striped and eats ectoparasites | Trahira (Hoplias cf. malabaricus) | - |
| Caribbean and Indo-Pacific coral reefs | Species of cleaner shrimp | Eat ectoparasites at cleaning stations, scavenge; omnivorous | Fish of various species | |
| Caribbean and Indo-Pacific coral reefs | Crab Planes minutus | Eat ectoparasites while living on host | Loggerhead sea turtle (Caretta caretta) | |
| Pan-tropical coral reefs: Western Atlantic, Pacific | Decapod Stenopus hispidus ("banded coral shrimp") | Waves antennae to advertise service; eats parasites, fungi, dead tissue | Fish of various species; hawksbill sea turtle | |
| African plains, savanna | Red-billed oxpecker (Buphagus erythrorhynchus) | Eats blue ticks (Boophilus decoloratus) and brown ear ticks (Rhipicephalus appendiculatus) (up to 100 adults or 1000 larvae/day), blood: keeps skin wounds open | Large mammals, e.g. impala, rhinoceros, domestic cattle | |
| Brazilian open country | Wattled jacana (Jacana jacana), shiny cowbird (Molothrus bonariensis), cattle tyrant (Machetornis rixosa), giant cowbird (Molothrus oryzivorus), yellow-headed caracara (Milvago chimachima) | Feed on ticks, horseflies, other parasites | Capybara (Hydrochoerus hydrochaeris) | |
| North American deserts, forests, etc. | Species of pseudoscorpions | Eat packrat ectoparasites | Species of packrat (Neotoma) | |
| Hawaii submerged lava platform | Cleaner fish, mostly yellow tang (Zebrasoma flavescens) and golden eye surgeon fish (Ctenochaetus) | Fish at cleaning stations forage on shells and skin of turtles | Green sea turtle (Chelonia mydas) | |
| Kenya and Uganda | Banded mongooses (Mungos mungo) | Have been observed removing ticks and other parasites | Warthog (Phacochoerus africanus) | |

The best known cleaning symbioses are among marine fishes, where several species of small fish, notably of wrasse, are specialised in colour, pattern and behaviour as cleaners, providing a cleaning and ectoparasite removal service to larger, often predatory fish. Cleaner species, as shown in the table, vary widely in their degree of dependence on their clients. Some are essentially pure obligate symbionts like the cleaner wrasse; some are opportunistic or facultative symbionts, like the orange chromide or some cleaner shrimps; and some, like the oxpeckers, combine a little eating of parasites (beneficial to client) with taking of blood (harmful to client), their favoured food.

== Mimicry among cleaner fish ==
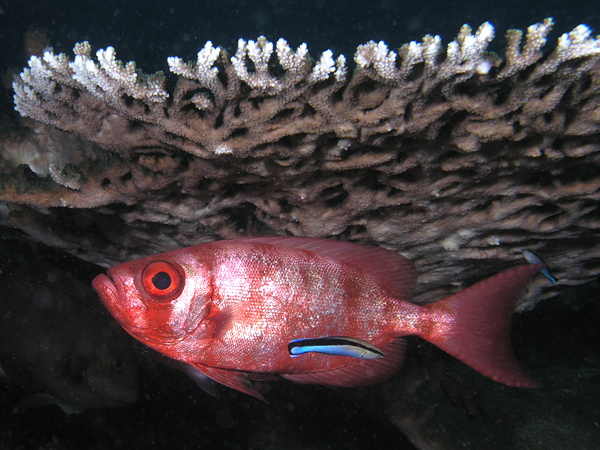
Small, long, blue-striped cleaner wrasse (Labroides dimidiatus) servicing a lunar-tailed bigeye (Priacanthus hamrur)

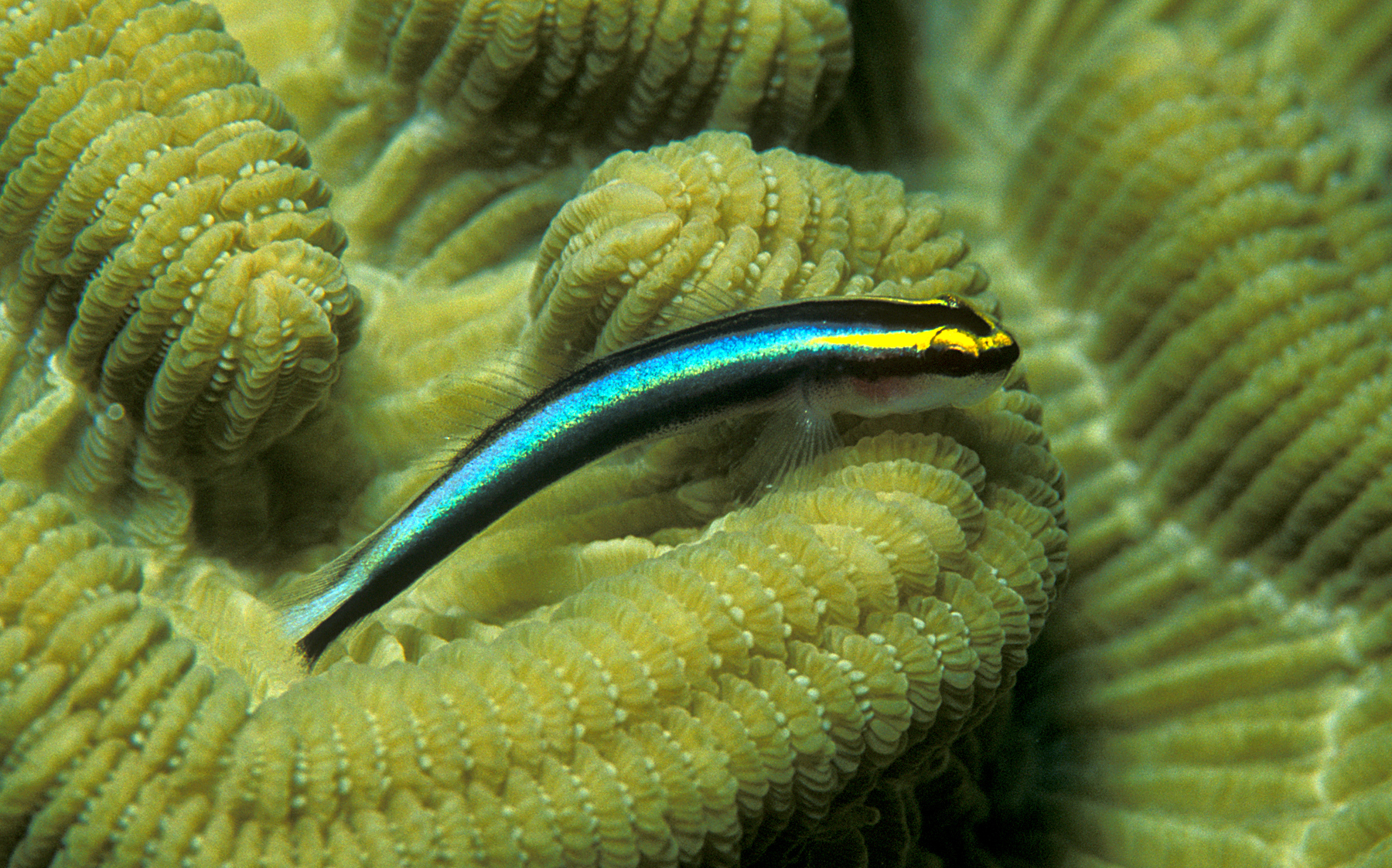
Small, long, blue-striped Caribbean cleaning goby (Elacatinus evelynae) strikingly resembles the unrelated cleaner wrasse of the Indo-Pacific in pattern and behaviour

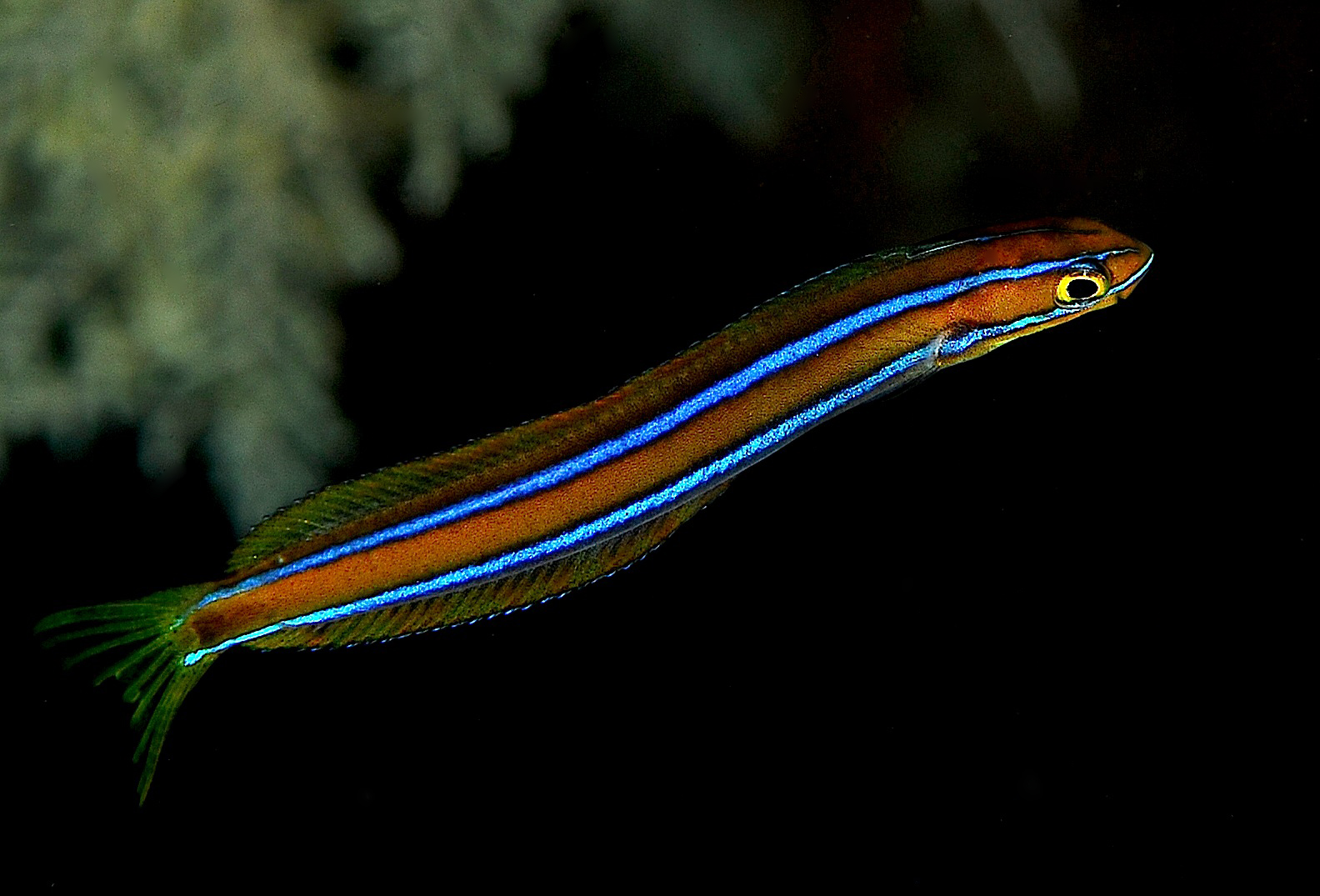
The blue-lined sabertooth blenny (Plagiotremus rhinorhynchos) is an aggressive mimic of the blue-striped cleaner wrasse (Labroides dimidiatus), copying its dance but then biting the duped client

=== Mutual mimicry among cleaner fish ===
Many cleaner fish in different families, such as the Caribbean neon goby (Elacatinus evelynae) and the Indo-Pacific cleaner wrasse (Labroides dimidiatus) share the distinctive combination of a long narrow body, a longitudinal stripe, a blue colour, and small size. "Convergent signalling among cleaners, using size, stripes and colour, should facilitate their recognition by fish clients." This is analogous to Müllerian mimicry where genuinely aposematic species (such as wasps) mimic each other's warning colours.

=== Aggressive mimicry of cleaner fish by blennies ===
The sabre-toothed blenny (Aspidontus taeniatus) is a predatory blenny, an aggressive mimic which accurately resembles the bluestreak cleaner wrasse, not only in colour and pattern, but also in the ritualised dance the cleaner wrasse makes when potential client fish swim nearby. However, instead of providing the cleaning service that it signals, it bites off pieces of healthy skin, scales and mucus from the host and then swims rapidly away to safety.

Comparison of Batesian mimicry with aggressive mimicry of cleaner fish
| Type of mimicry | Model | Mimic | Dupe | Model-dupe relationship | Dupe's expectation | Effect |
|---|---|---|---|---|---|---|
| Batesian mimicry | Wasp | Hoverfly | Predatory bird | Antagonistic predator-prey | Mimic looks noxious | Mimic dupes predator into not eating the mimic |
| Aggressive mimicry | Bluestreak cleaner wrasse | Sabre-toothed blenny | Client fish | Co-operative cleaner-client | Mimic looks to be a cleaner | Mimic dupes client into allowing the mimic to bite |

The effect of aggressive mimicry in a cleaning symbiosis is analogous to Batesian mimicry, where a harmless "edible mimetic species copies the warning signal of a noxious, aposematic model species, thereby gaining protection from predators". As in Batesian mimicry, the rate of successful attacks on cleaning clients by the bluestriped fangblenny (Plagiotremus rhinorhynchos), which like the sabre-toothed blenny mimic the bluestreak cleaner wrasse (Labroides dimidiatus), is frequency-dependent, meaning that the mimicry is more effective when the cheating fangblenny is rare compared to the cleaner wrasse. The difference, however, is that the aggressive mimic is inserting itself into a co-operative relationship (between cleaner and client), whereas "Batesian mimics insert themselves into an antagonistic predator–prey interaction (where the models are the unpalatable prey)." The fangblenny has evolved an opioid-containing venom which dulls pain and lowers blood pressure, confusing the bitten host and giving the cheating mimic time to escape.
