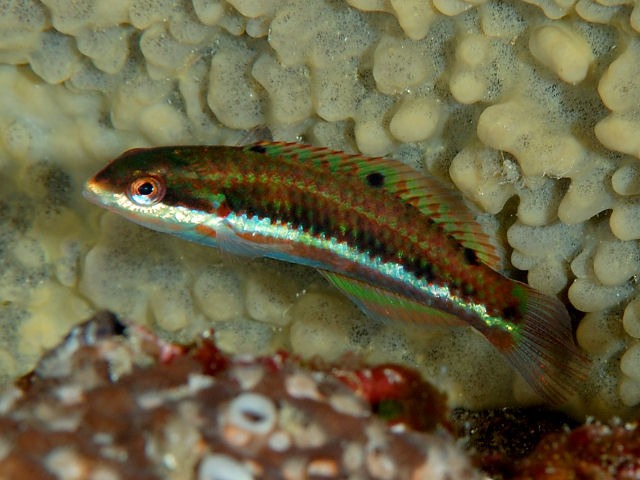

Conservation status
- Least Concern (IUCN 3.1)

Scientific classification
- Kingdom: Animalia
- Phylum: Chordata
- Class: Actinopterygii
- Order: Labriformes
- Family: Labridae
- Genus: Thalassoma
- Species: T. jansenii

Binomial name
- Thalassoma jansenii (Bleeker, 1856)

Synonyms
- Julis jansenii Bleeker, 1856

= Jansen's wrasse =

Species of fish

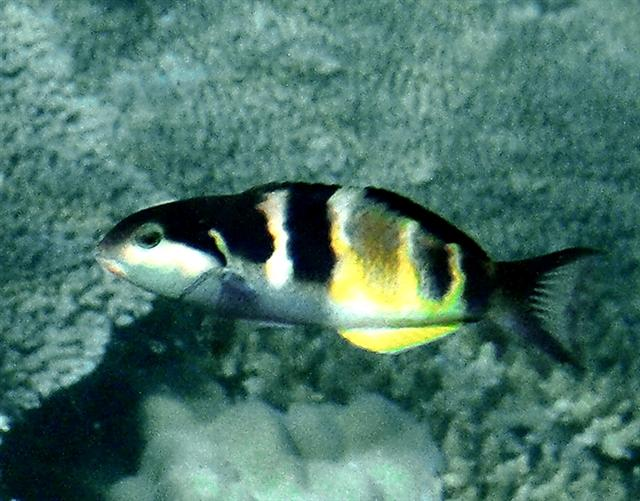

Jansen's wrasse (Thalassoma jansenii) is a species of ray-finned fish, a wrasse from the family Labridae which is native to the Indian Ocean and Pacific Ocean. In the south-western Pacific Ocean it is replaced by sibling species black-barred wrasse (Thalassoma nigrofasciatum). It can be found in the aquarium trade.

== Description ==
In its initial phase Jansen's wrasse is white with three black bars, the first of which is on upper half of head and anterior body and contains a yellow strip on the margin of the gill cover. The second band goes across dorsal fin and ends at the anus while the third covers most of the body and the rear parts of dorsal and anal fins. The terminal phase males have yellow between black bars. The pectoral fins have a bluish colour. This species can grow to 20 cm (7.9 in) in total length. It has 8 spines and 13 soft rays in its dorsal fin and 3 spines and 11 soft rays in its anal fin.

== Distribution ==
Jansen's wrasse is found in the Indian Ocean and the Pacific Ocean from the Maldiives to Fiji, north to Japan and south to Shark Bay, Western Australia.

== Habitat and biology ==
Jansen's wrasse is found in coral reefs and over reef flats at depths of 1–15 metres (3.3–49.2 ft), however, it is not normally encountered at depth greater than 12 metres (39 ft). It is a carnivore and its diet includes benthic invertebrates and larger animals. It is a social species which occurs in groups. Like many other coral reef wrasses, this species swims actively over the reef using solely their pectoral fins for thrust (known as labriform locomotion). This species is a protogynous hermaphrodite, some females change into males when there are no males available. They have also been observed to act as cleaner fish.

== Human usage ==
Jansen's wrasse is collected for the aquarium trade.

== Species description ==
Jansen's wrasse was first formally described as Julis jansenii in 1856 by the Dutch zoologist and military doctor Pieter Bleeker (1819-1878) with a type locality given as Manado on Sulawesi.

The fish is named in honor of Albert Jacques Frédéric Jansen (d. 1861), an administrator in the Dutch East Indies who provided the type specimen.
