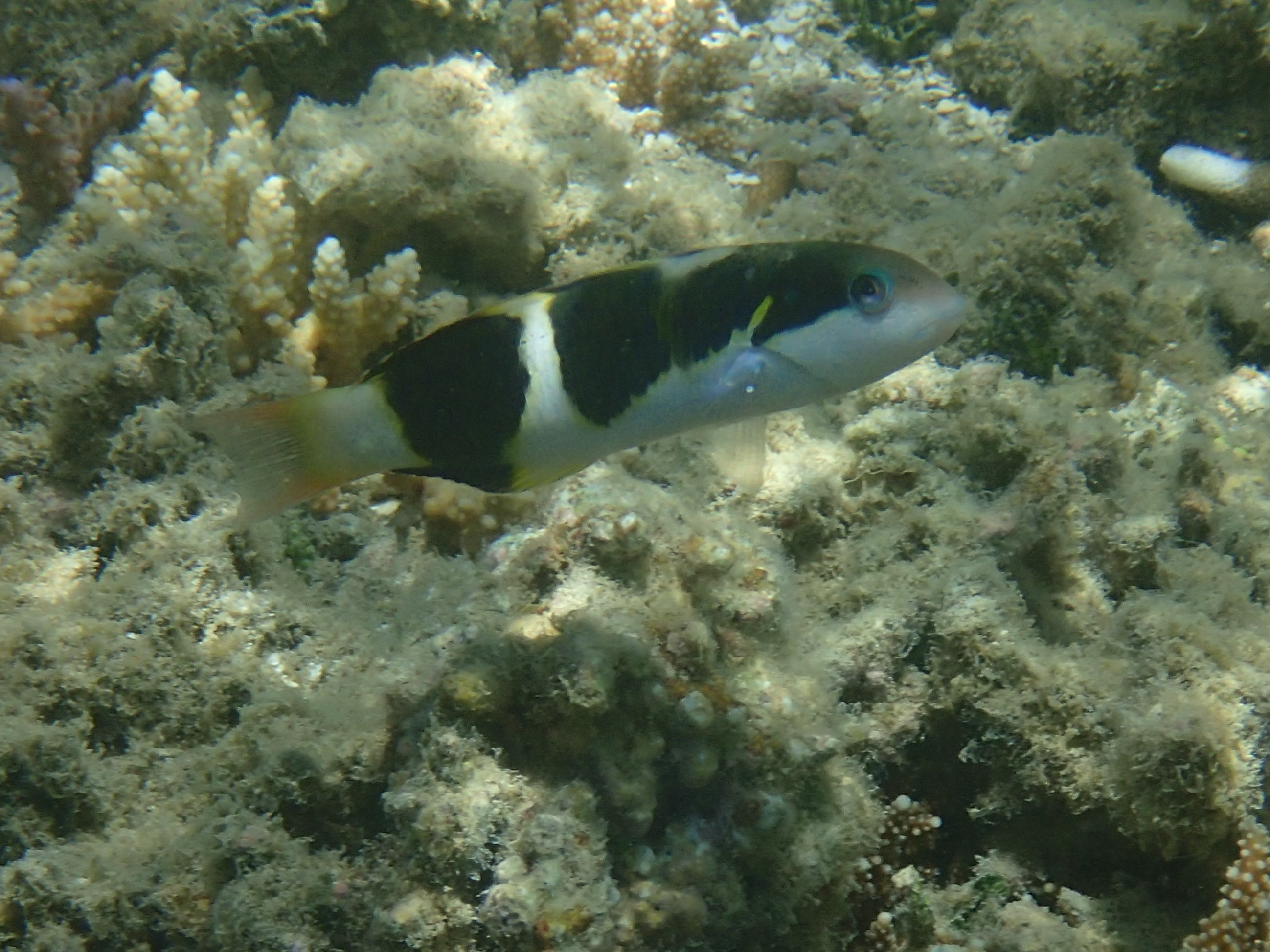

Conservation status
- Least Concern (IUCN 3.1)

Scientific classification
- Kingdom: Animalia
- Phylum: Chordata
- Class: Actinopterygii
- Order: Labriformes
- Family: Labridae
- Genus: Thalassoma
- Species: T. nigrofasciatum

Binomial name
- Thalassoma nigrofasciatum Randall, 2003

= Black-barred wrasse =

Species of fish

The black-barred wrasse (Thalassoma nigrofasciatum) is a species of ray-finned fish, a wrasse from the family Labridae which is native to the southwestern Pacific Ocean.

== Description ==
In the black-barred wrasse the adults are blackish above and have the ventral half of the head, chest and belly white. There is a short white to yellow vertical stripe which starts above the pectoral-fin base, a further two broad white to yellow stripes are on the flanks and they have a yellow tail. In females, the pale areas are largely white, while in the males the pale areas are more yellow. The males also have a pale pink chin and long, thin filaments on the lobes of the caudal fin and pink patches on the ventral parts of the head and chest. Males have been measured at standard length of 20 centimetres (7.9 in). This species is frequently confused with the similar Jansen's wrasse (Thalassoma janseni).

== Distribution ==
The black-barred wrasse is found in the south western Pacific Ocean from eastern Papua New Guinea and the Solomon Islands south to the Great Barrier Reef, Lord Howe Island and Norfolk Island, the Kermadec Islands, New Caledonia and Tonga, it has also been recorded in Niue.

== Habitat and biology ==
The black-barred wrasse occurs in tidal pools and reefs, both inner and outer reefs, between 0 to 15 metres (0 to 49 ft). It can occur solitarily or in small groups.

== Taxonomy ==
The black-barred wrasse was only described in 2003, it is closely related to Jansen's wrasse and the two species may be easily confused. Many of their molecular characteristics are the same but they do differ in a single nucleotide of the cytochrome b sequence. Despite being morphologicallu almost identical, they are each most probably separate and valid species and there may have been confusion over identification in previously stated distributions.
