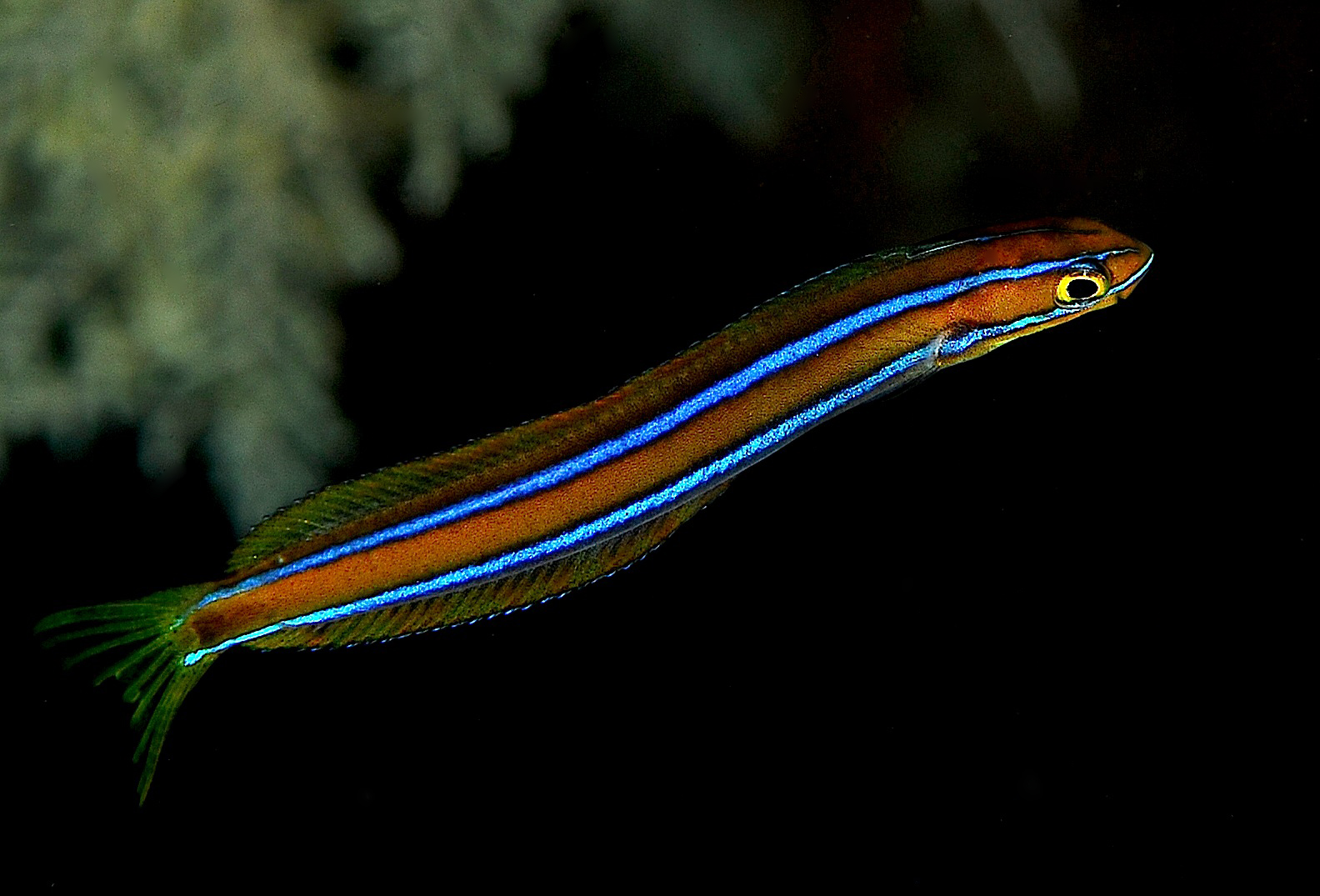

Conservation status
- Least Concern (IUCN 3.1)

Scientific classification
- Kingdom: Animalia
- Phylum: Chordata
- Class: Actinopterygii
- Order: Blenniiformes
- Family: Blenniidae
- Genus: Plagiotremus
- Species: P. rhinorhynchos

Binomial name
- Plagiotremus rhinorhynchos (Bleeker, 1852)

Synonyms
- Aspidontus rhinorhynchos (Bleeker, 1852); Petroscirtes rhinorhynchos Bleeker, 1852; Runula rhinorhynchos (Bleeker, 1852); Petroscirtes amblyrhynchos Bleeker, 1857

= Bluestriped fangblenny =

Species of fish

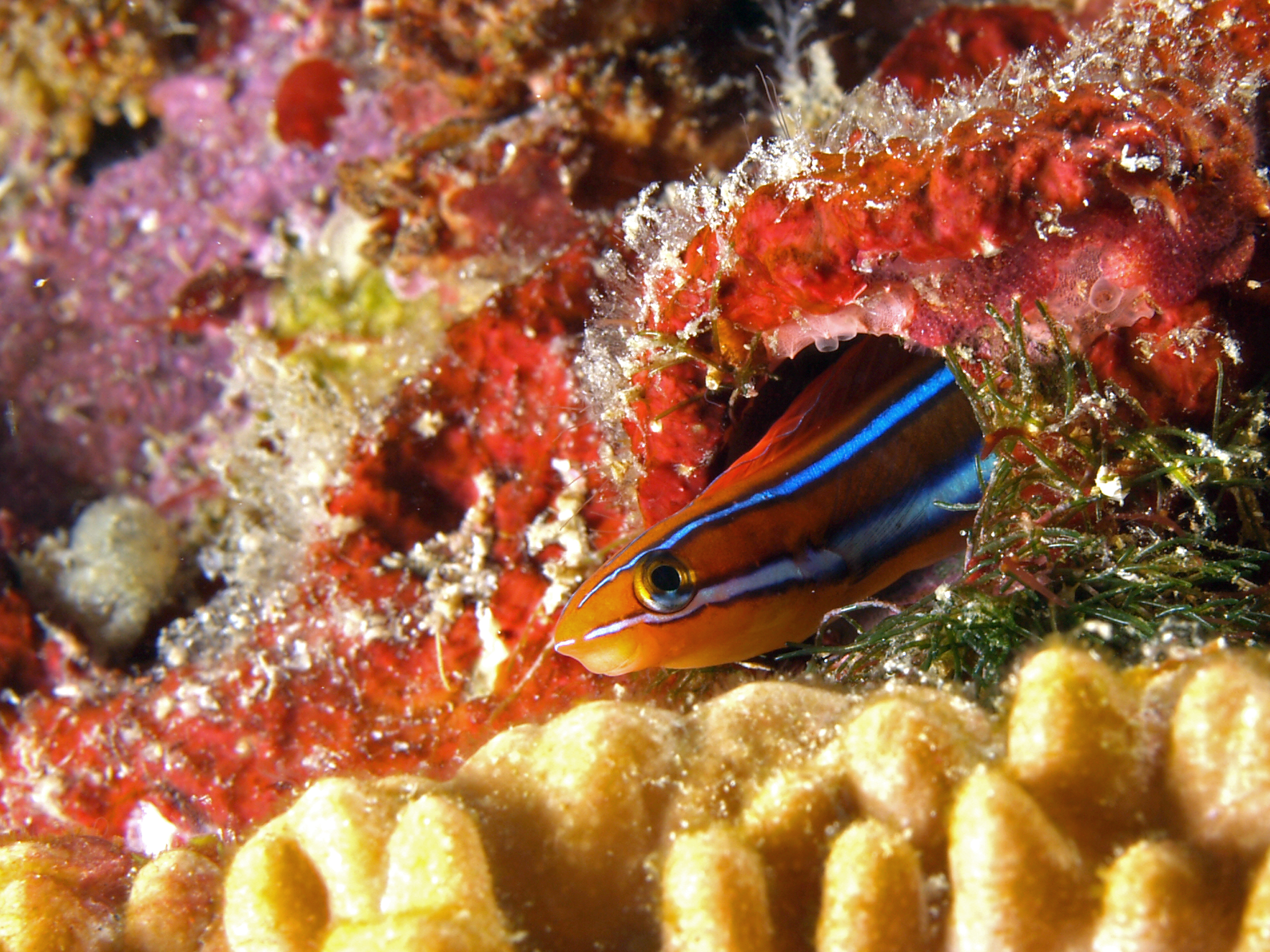
Bluestriped fangblenny in a coral hole

Plagiotremus rhinorhynchos, commonly called the bluestriped fangblenny, is a species of combtooth blenny found in coral reefs in the Pacific and Indian Ocean. This species reaches a length of 12 centimetres (4.7 in) SL. It is also known as the bluestriped blenny, bluestriped sabretooth blenny, blunt-nose blenny, cleaner mimic, tube-worm blenny or the two-stripe blenny. They hide in deserted worm tubes or other small holes.

The fangblenny is a specialised mimic of juvenile bluestreak cleaner wrasse. Those fish serve as cleaners to larger host fish, which attend to have ectoparasites removed. The fangblenny does no cleaning, but bites the host fish and leaves.

== Description ==
From before birth, their eggs are demersal and adhesive and attach to substrates via a filamentous adhesive pad or pedestal. The bluestriped fangblenny can attain around 90mm in length. Two distinct colour phases of this fish are present; blue with a black stripe from snout to tail, or orange with two narrow blue lines from snout to tail. Unlike most blennies, the bluestriped fangblenny is free swimming. Adults inhabit clear, coral-rich areas of lagoon and seaward reefs and it is fairly common on both coral and rocky reefs, usually occurring singly or in pairs. They are known for being aggressive and feed on skin, mucus and sometimes other fish scales. They bite divers when alarmed.

== Aggressive mimicry ==
Bluestriped fangblenny mimic the juvenile bluestreak cleaner wrasse, Labroides dimidiatus, to enable them to loiter at cleaner stations and dupe clients waiting to be cleaned. Their success in this aggressive mimicry is, like Batesian mimicry, frequency-dependent: it works best when the mimic is rare compared to the genuinely symbiotic cleaner fish.

== See also ==
- Cleaner fish
- Cleaning symbiosis
