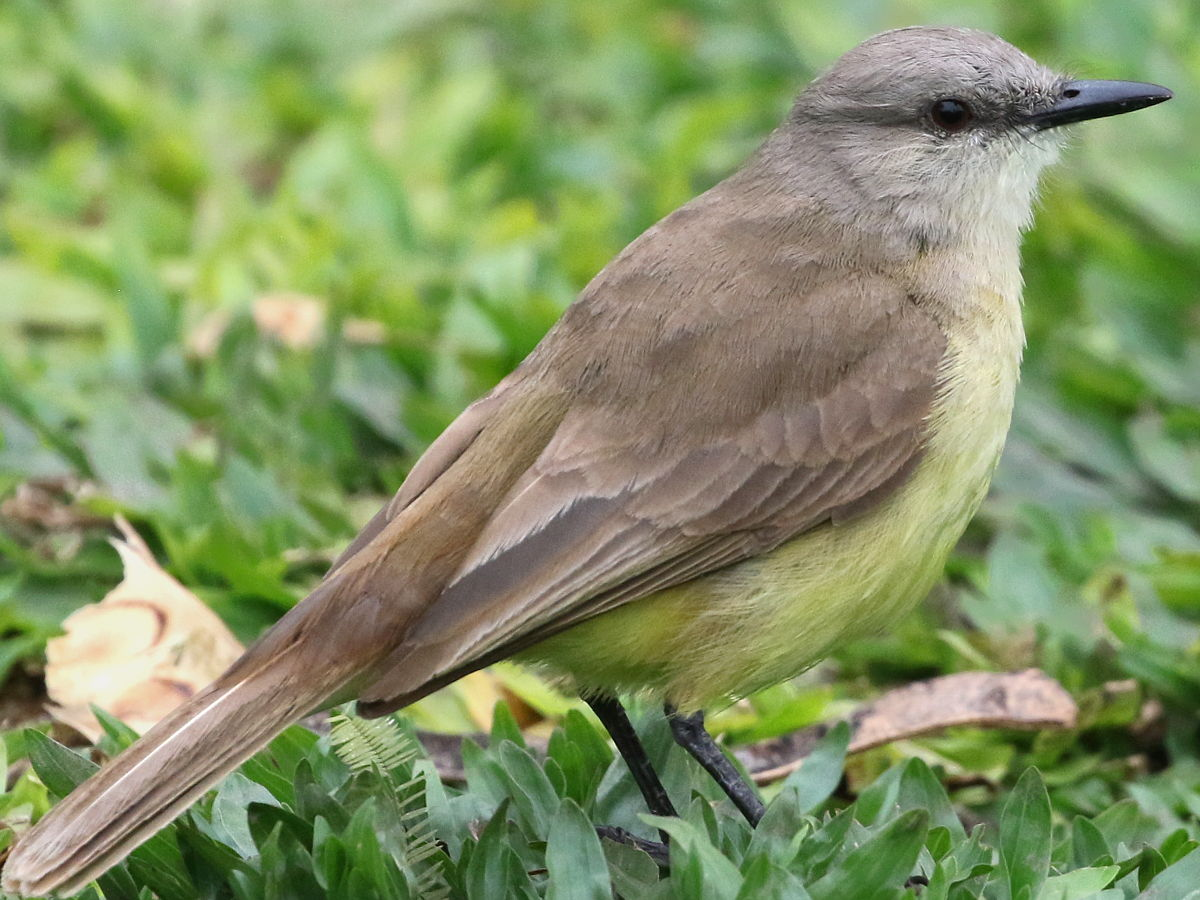

Conservation status
- Least Concern (IUCN 3.1)

Scientific classification
- Kingdom: Animalia
- Phylum: Chordata
- Class: Aves
- Order: Passeriformes
- Family: Tyrannidae
- Genus: Machetornis; G.R. Gray, 1841
- Species: M. rixosa

Binomial name
- Machetornis rixosa (Vieillot, 1819)

Synonyms
- Machetornis rixosus (Vieillot, 1819)

= Cattle tyrant =

Species of bird (Machetornis rixosa)

The cattle tyrant (Machetornis rixosa) is a species of bird in the tyrant flycatcher family Tyrannidae. In Brazil, it is called suiriri-cavaleiro. It is the only member of the genus Machetornis. The relationships of this species and genus to other genera in the tyrant flycatchers are uncertain. It resembles Tyrannus flycatchers, but this may be the result of convergence.

== Subspecies and distribution ==
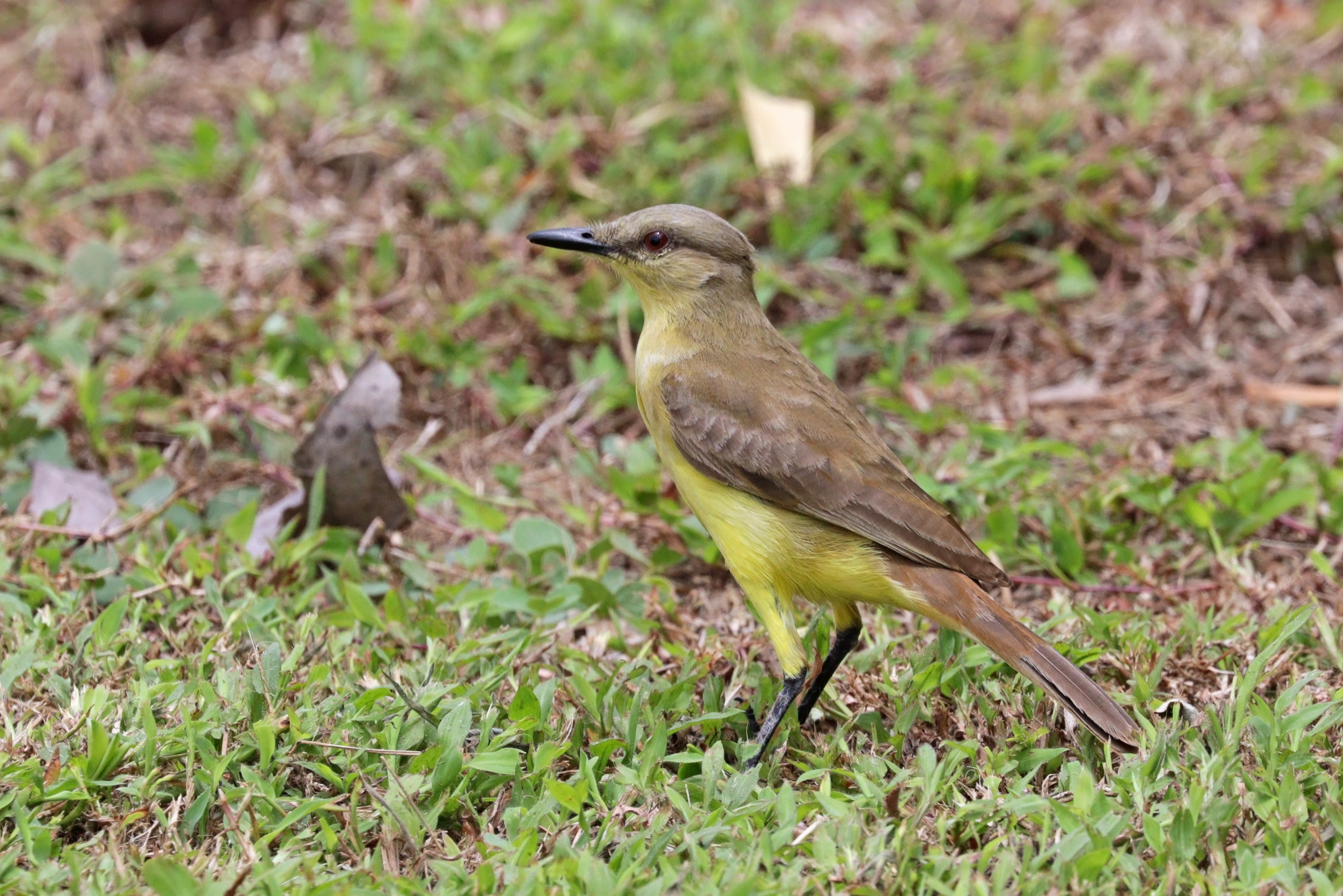
M. r. flavigularis, Panama

The genus name was given to the species by George Robert Gray and is derived from the Ancient Greek makhētēs for fighter and ornis for bird, a reference to its pugnacious behaviour and habit of dispossessing other species of their nests. The specific name comes from the Latin rixosus meaning quarrelsome, again referring to the behaviour and temperament of the species.

The species has a disjunct distribution, with three subspecies accepted:

- M. r. rixosa (Vieillot, 1819), the nominate subspecies, in eastern South America from northern Argentina and Bolivia to the north-eastern tip of Brazil.
- M. r. flavigularis Todd, 1912, in southernmost Central America and northwestern South America from Panama to western Colombia and western Venezuela.
- M. r. obscurodorsalis W. H. Phelps & W. H. Phelps Jr, 1948, in north-central South America from eastern Ecuador through central Colombia to eastern Venezuela.

The two northern subspecies, partly but not fully separated by the Andes with some overlap in Venezuela, are not very distinct from each other and may be better merged under the older name M. r. flavigularis.

The species inhabits drier open and semi-open habitats, and avoids forested and wooded areas. It can be found in savannah, pastureland, parkland, agricultural land and even gardens. Due to deforestation, the species has recently colonised areas where it was previously absent, such as northeast Ecuador.

== Description ==
The cattle tyrant is a highly terrestrial tyrant flycatcher, 19.5–20 cm (7.7–7.9 in) long and weighing 29–40 g (1.0–1.4 oz). The plumage of the nominate subspecies is mostly olive-brown above and yellow below, with a grey head with a thin dark eyestripe and a paler, whitish throat. The thin bill and legs are black. The two other subspecies differ from the nominate in having the head less grey, more like the olive-brown of the back, and a yellower throat.

== Behaviour ==
Cattle tyrants feed on insects, mostly from the ground. It may follow cattle or other large animals for some distance, catching flushed prey, or even hitch rides on these animals, and then snatching flushed prey with a quick sally-flight. It may sometimes hawk for insects from a high perch. The species is sometimes reported to have a cleaning symbiosis with the large mammals it lives with. It takes ticks off mammals only occasionally, but it will sometimes hunt horseflies attempting to land on capybaras.

Cattle tyrants build bulky nests or steal the nests of rufous-fronted thornbirds. Three to four eggs are laid and incubated for 14 days. The chicks fledge after 15 days.

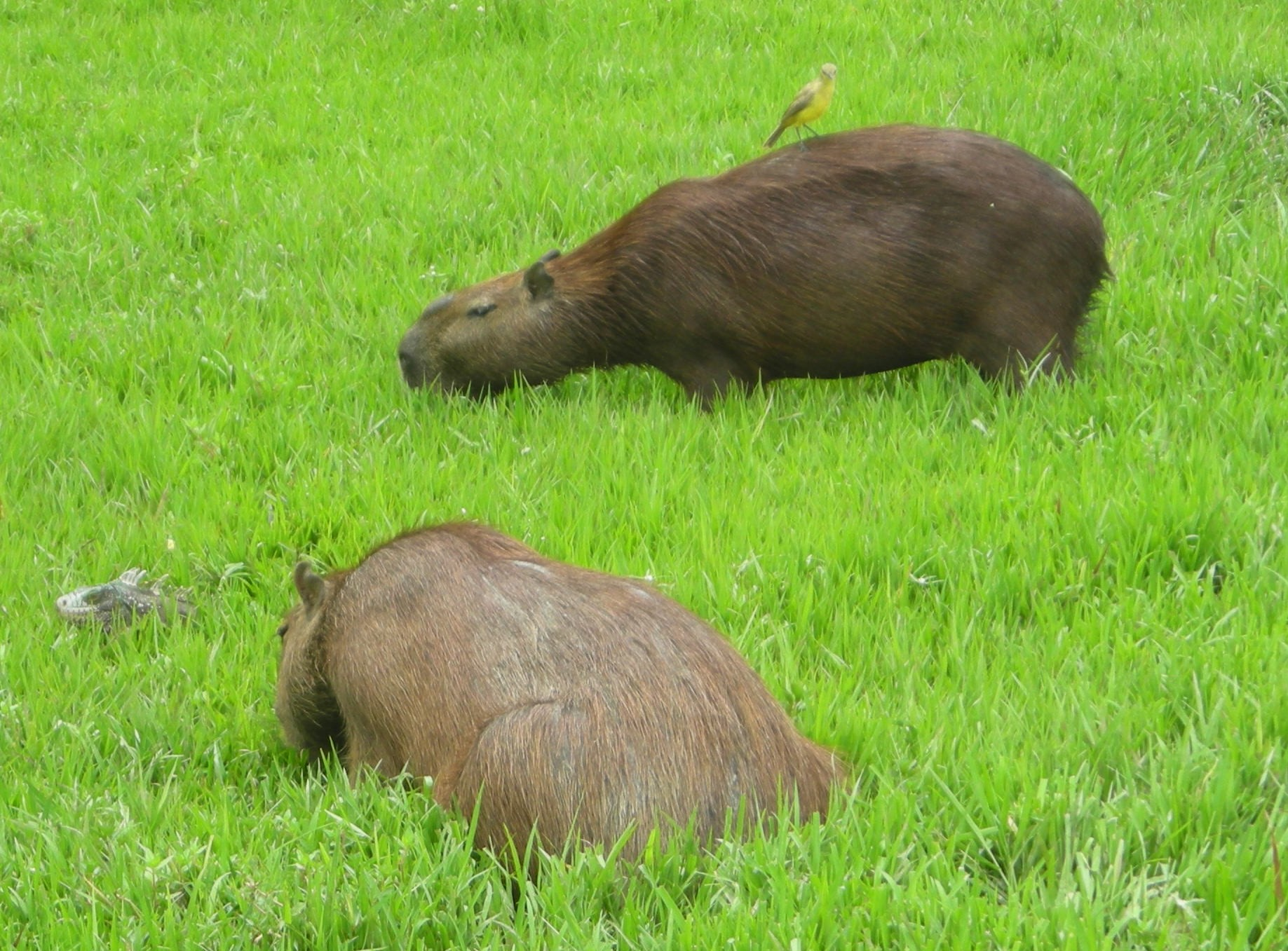
Cleaning symbiosis foraging on a capybara

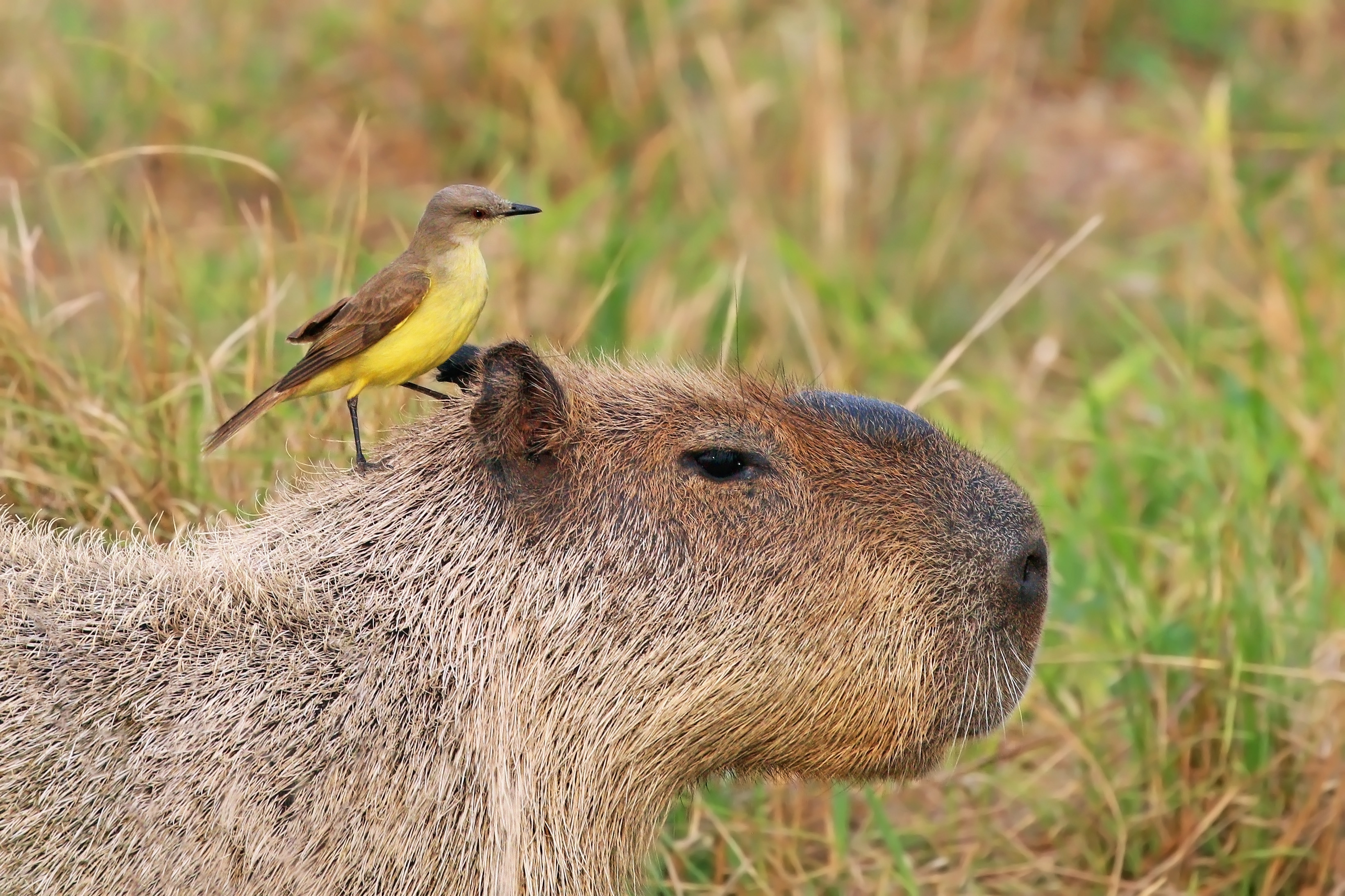
Perched on capybara

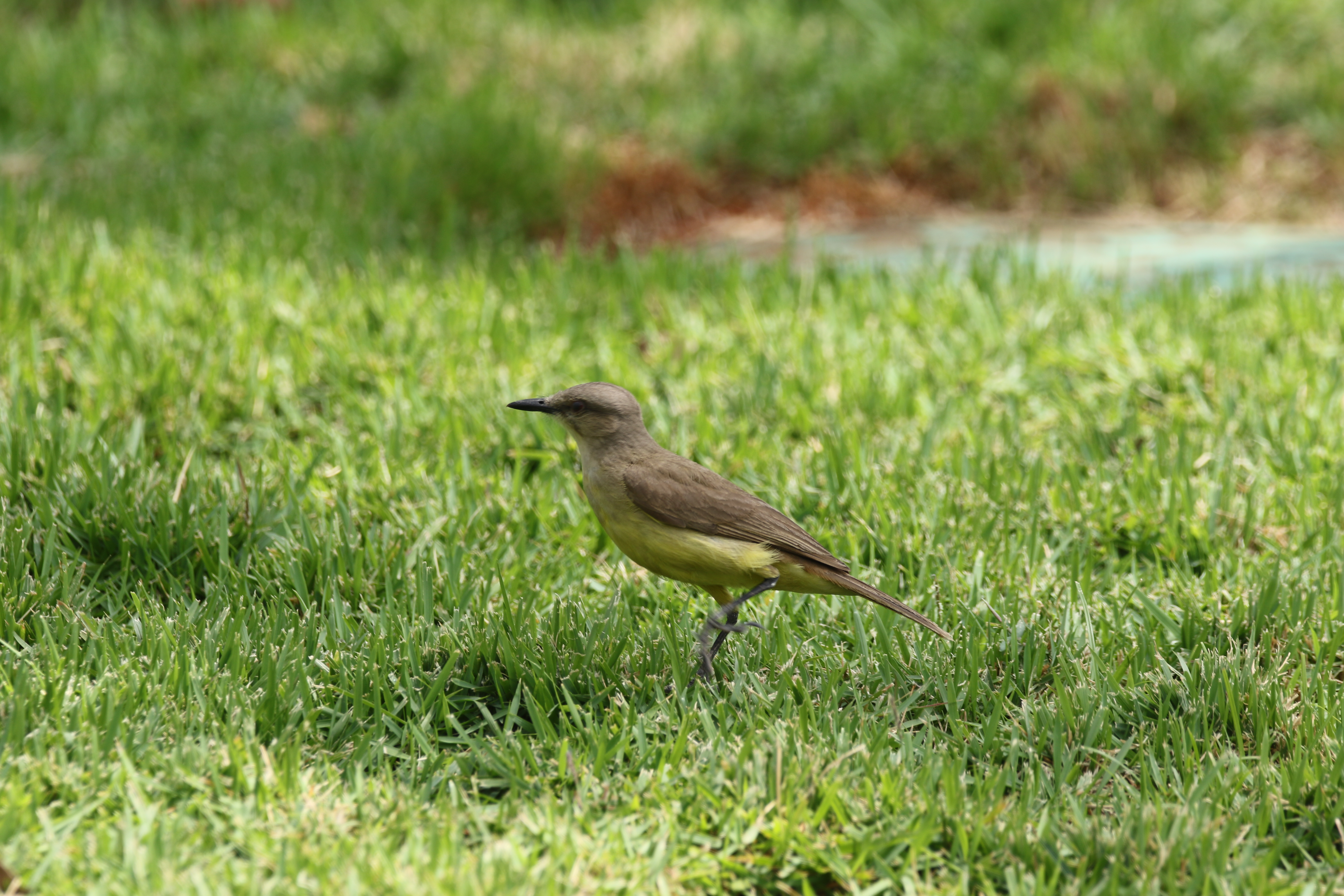
