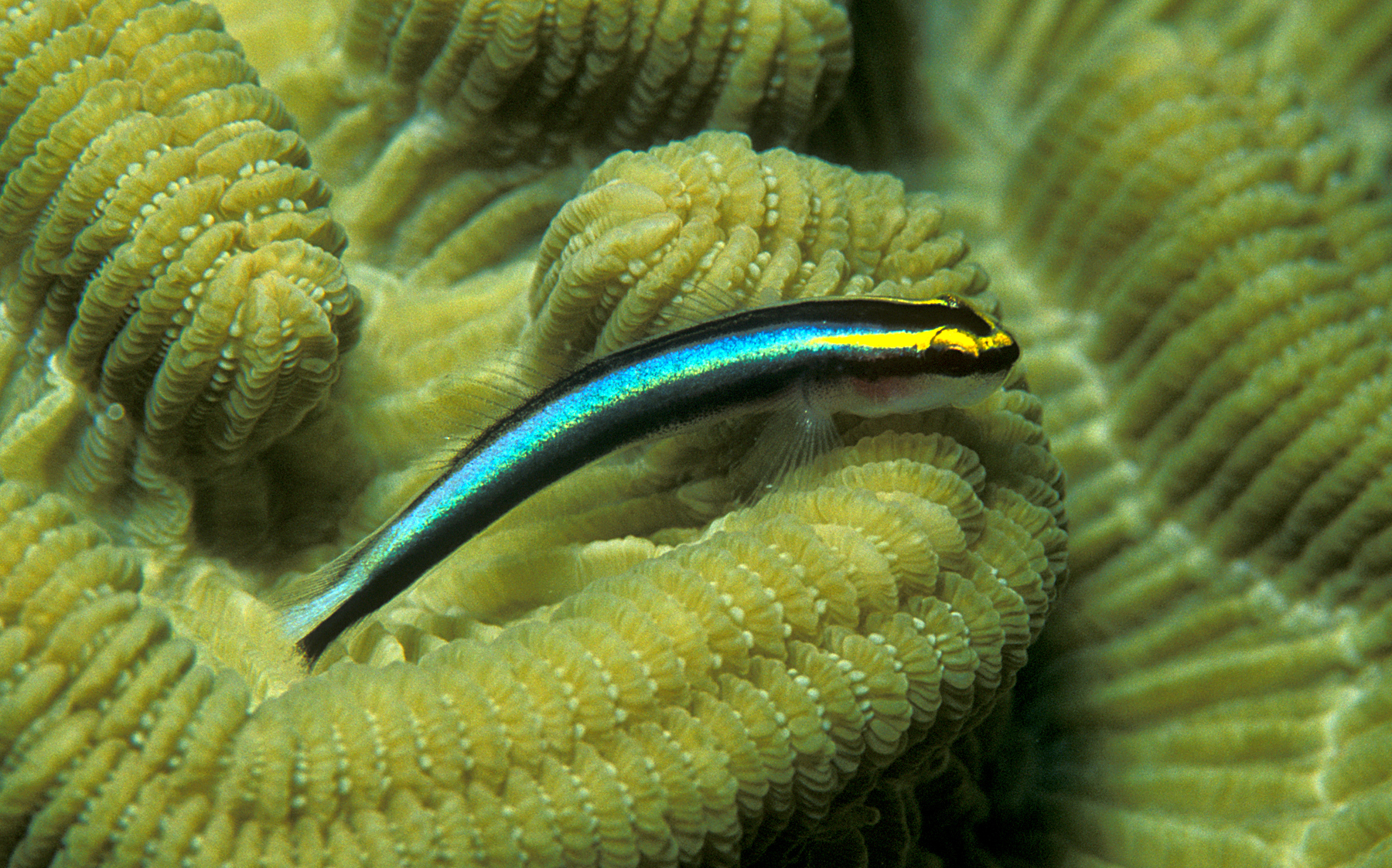
- Elacatinus evelynae resting on a boulder brain coral (Colpophyllia natans)

Conservation status
- Least Concern (IUCN 3.1)

Scientific classification
- Kingdom: Animalia
- Phylum: Chordata
- Class: Actinopterygii
- Order: Gobiiformes
- Family: Gobiidae
- Genus: Elacatinus
- Species: E. evelynae

Binomial name
- Elacatinus evelynae (J. E. Böhlke & C. R. Robins, 1968)

Synonyms
- Gobiosoma evelynae J. E. Böhlke & C. R. Robins, 1968

= Elacatinus evelynae =

Species of fish

Elacatinus evelynae, commonly known as the sharknose goby, Caribbean cleaner goby, or Caribbean cleaning goby, is a species of goby native to the Western Atlantic Ocean from the Bahamas and the Lesser Antilles to the northern coast of South America, as well as the Antilles and western Caribbean.

== Appearance ==
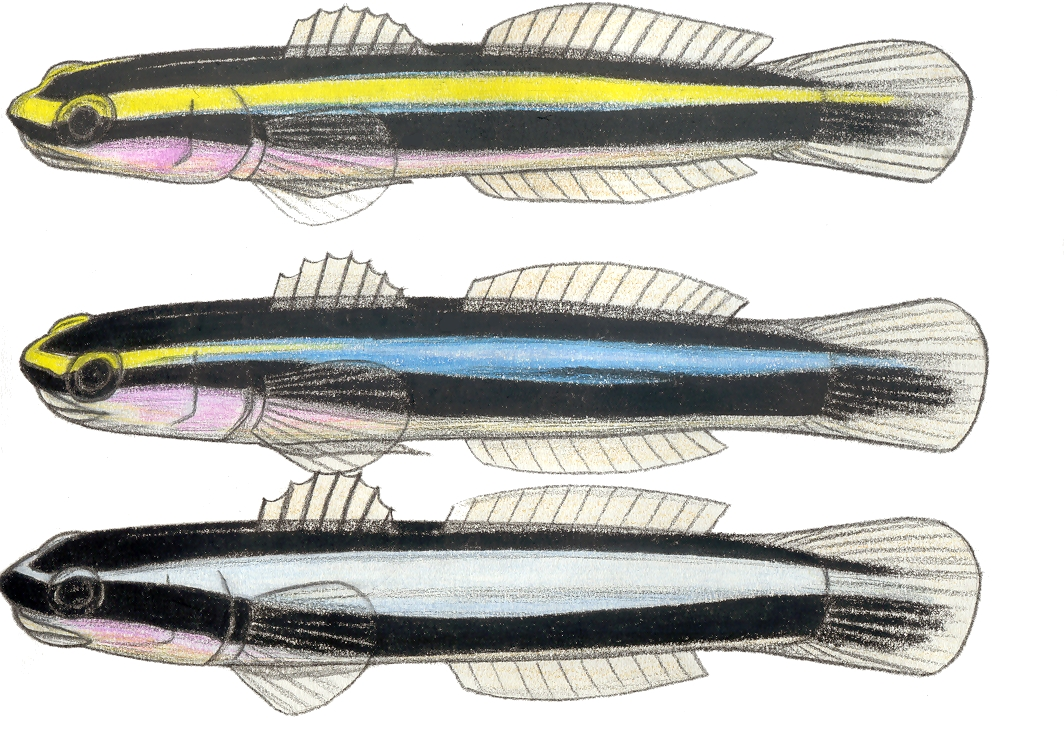
Elacatinus evelynae

Elacatinus evelynae is a very small, torpedo-shaped fish. It can reach a maximum length of 4 cm (1.6 in). It has a yellow stripe in front of each eye that joins to form a V near the tip of its snout. Black stripes run under the yellow ones from the snout, over the lower part of the eye to the end of the caudal fin. E. evelynae's fin configuration is the same as all other gobies. Its dorsal fin is split in two, with a rounded anterior fin and a flat posterior fin which lines up with its anal fin. The pectoral fins are almost circular. All its fins are transparent.

== Habitat ==
They inhabit coral reefs in clear ocean waters at a depth of 1 to 53 metres (3 feet 3 inches to 173 feet 11 inches). The reported temperature range where they are found is 22 to 27 °C (72 to 81 °F). These gobies typically can be found around and upon textured surfaces and coral heads that contain large polyps like great star coral (Montastraea), mustard hill coral (Porites astreoides) and lettuce coral (Agaricia agaricites). These fish require textured surfaces to maintain their position when exposed to marine conditions such as Ocean currents, swell and tides. This is because they are not strong enough swimmers on their own to resist said marine conditions. It is crucial for the E. evelynae to maintain a general position so that the fish that they clean can find them easily.

== Diet ==
E. evelynae is a cleaner fish as indicated by one of its common names, the Caribbean cleaning goby. They feed on ectoparasites and dead skin found on other fish. E. evelynae also feeds on sponges, sea squirts, coral polyps, zooplankton and free-living copepods. Females tend to clean and feed more than males especially if they are accompanied by a large male, which may be due to mate guarding and the male spending more time guarding the eggs.

== Reproduction ==
They are monogamous and are usually found in pairs near coral heads. Both males and females show aggression towards potential intruders of the same sex to protect their mates. Attempts to breed them in captivity have shown that they do not produce eggs unless conditions are optimal, with little to no fluctuation in temperature and salinity.

== Name ==
The specific name honours Evelyn McCutcheon (1894–1977), of Salt Cay in the Bahamas, who provided hospitality to James Erwin Böhlke and his fellow ichthyologist Charles C. G. Chaplin.
