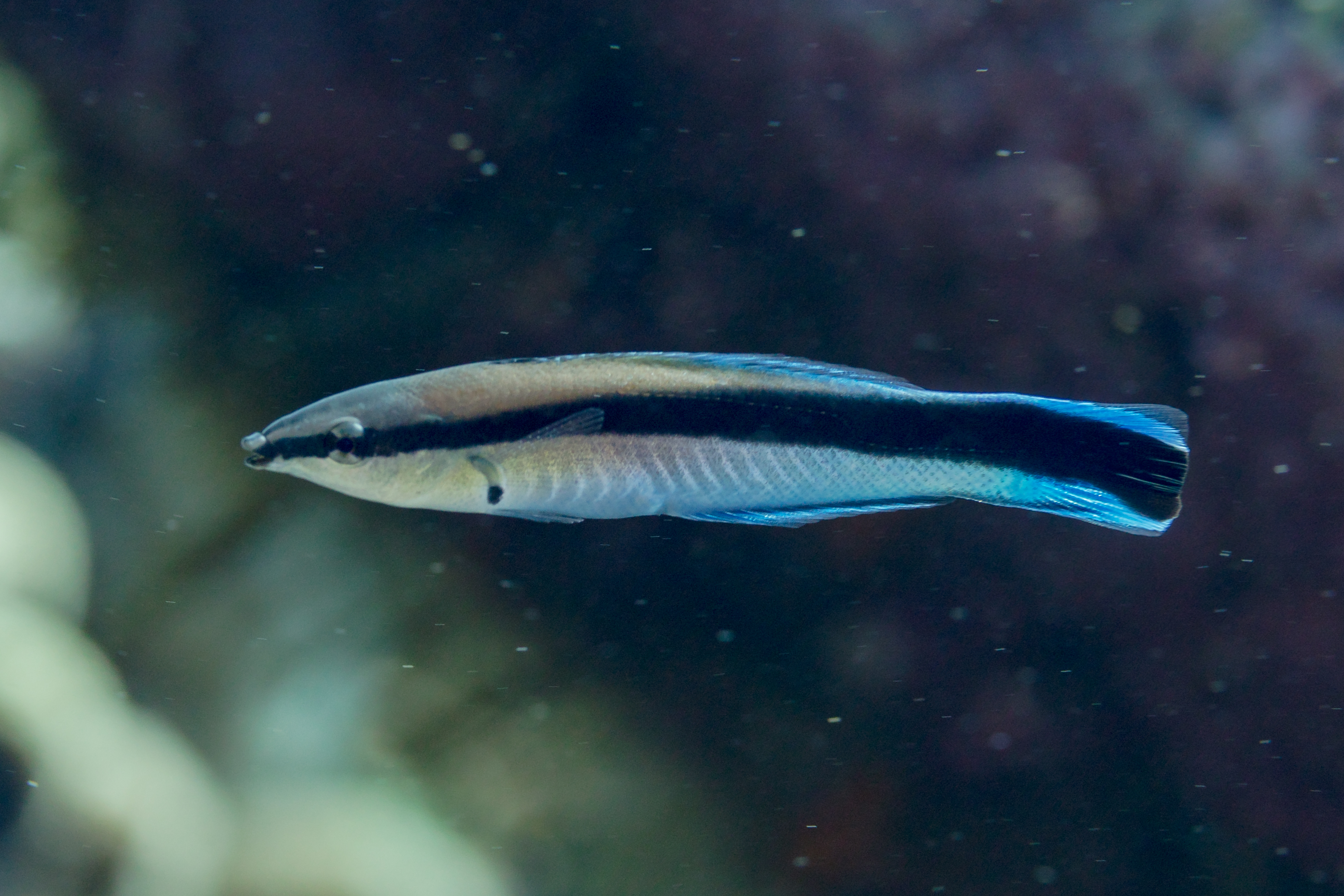
- In the Red Sea

Conservation status
- Least Concern (IUCN 3.1)

Scientific classification
- Kingdom: Animalia
- Phylum: Chordata
- Class: Actinopterygii
- Division: Teleostei
- Order: Labriformes
- Family: Labridae
- Genus: Labroides
- Species: L. dimidiatus

Binomial name
- Labroides dimidiatus (Valenciennes, 1839)

Synonyms
- List: Cossyphus dimidiatus Valenciennes, 1839; Labroides paradiseus Bleeker, 1851; Callyodon ikan Montrouzier, 1857; Labroides bicincta Saville-Kent, 1893; Labroides caeruleolineatus Fowler, 1945

= Bluestreak cleaner wrasse =

Species of fish

The bluestreak cleaner wrasse (Labroides dimidiatus) is one of several species of cleaner wrasses found on coral reefs from Eastern Africa and the Red Sea to French Polynesia. Like other cleaner wrasses, it eats parasites and dead tissue off larger fishes' skin in a mutualistic relationship that provides food and protection for the wrasse and considerable health benefits for the other fishes. It is also notable for having potentially passed the mirror test.

== Taxonomy ==
A genetic analysis of L. dimidiatus revealed the population fell into two monophyletic clades, with Indian Ocean populations generally having different stripe widths to western Pacific fishes. The Japanese cleaner wrasses, though, fell within the same group as Indian Ocean fish, despite differing in appearance, and both clades overlap around Papua New Guinea. Two closely related cleaner wrasse species, L. pectoralis and L. bicolor, were grouped inside the L. dimidiatus clade, so the bluestreak cleaner wrasse may in fact be polyphyletic, incorporating several species.

== Description ==
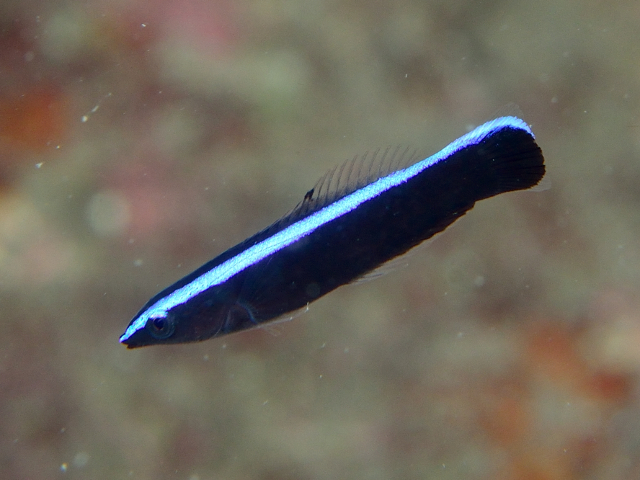
Juvenile

This is a young wrasse, averaging 10 cm (3.9 in) long, at most 14 cm (5.5 in). It can be recognized due to a wide, longitudinal, black stripe running along the side and eye; the back and the stomach are white (sometimes slightly yellowish). This white part changes to a bright blue on the front of the animal, while the black band widens at the tail. The young are black with an electric-blue line.

== Distribution ==
The bluestreak cleaner wrasse is found on coral reefs in the tropics from the Red Sea and Indian Ocean to the western Pacific (including Papua New Guinea, Japan, Fiji, and French Polynesia). It was first recorded from the Kermadec Islands Marine Reserve north of New Zealand in 2015, after researchers examined hundreds of hours of unused documentary film footage.

== Cleaning ==
Cleaner wrasses are usually found at cleaning stations, which are occupied by different units of cleaner wrasses, such as a group of youths, a pair of adults, or a group of females accompanied by a dominant male. When visitors come near the cleaning stations, the cleaner wrasses greet the visitors by performing a dance-like motion in which they move their rear up and down. The visitors are referred to as "clients". Bluestreak cleaner wrasses clean to consume ectoparasites on client fish for food. The bigger fish recognise them as cleaner fish because they have a lateral stripe along the length of their bodies, and by their movement patterns. Cleaner wrasses greet visitors in an effort to secure the food source and cleaning opportunity with the client. Upon recognising the cleaner and successfully soliciting its attention, the client fish adopts a species-specific pose to allow the cleaner access to its body surface, gills, and sometimes mouth. Other fish that engage in such cleaning behavior include goby fish (Elacatinus spp.) The bluestreak cleaner wrasse is known to clean balaenopterids, chondrichthyans, homarids, octopodids, and dermochelyids.

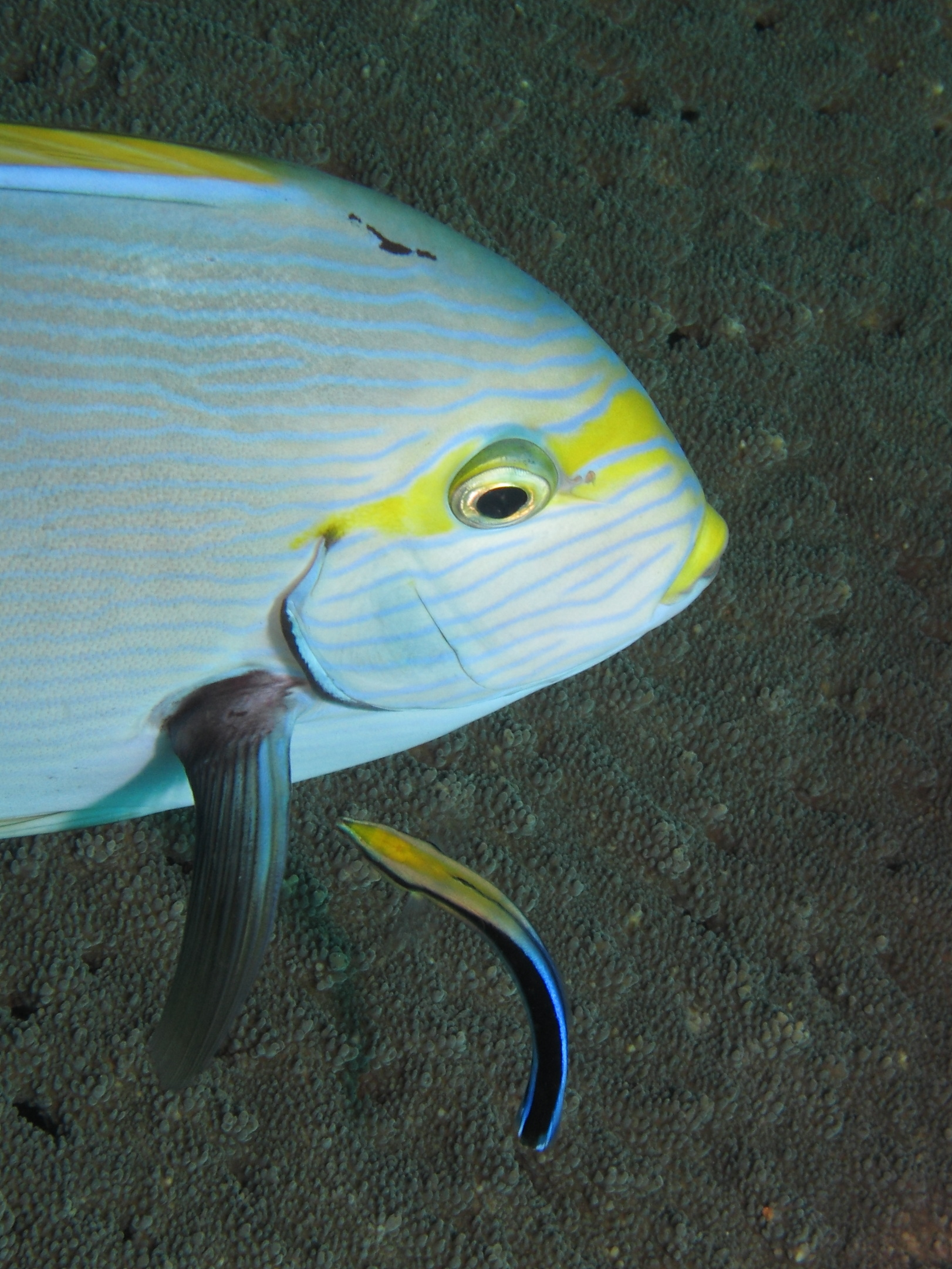
With a client elongated surgeonfish at a cleaning station

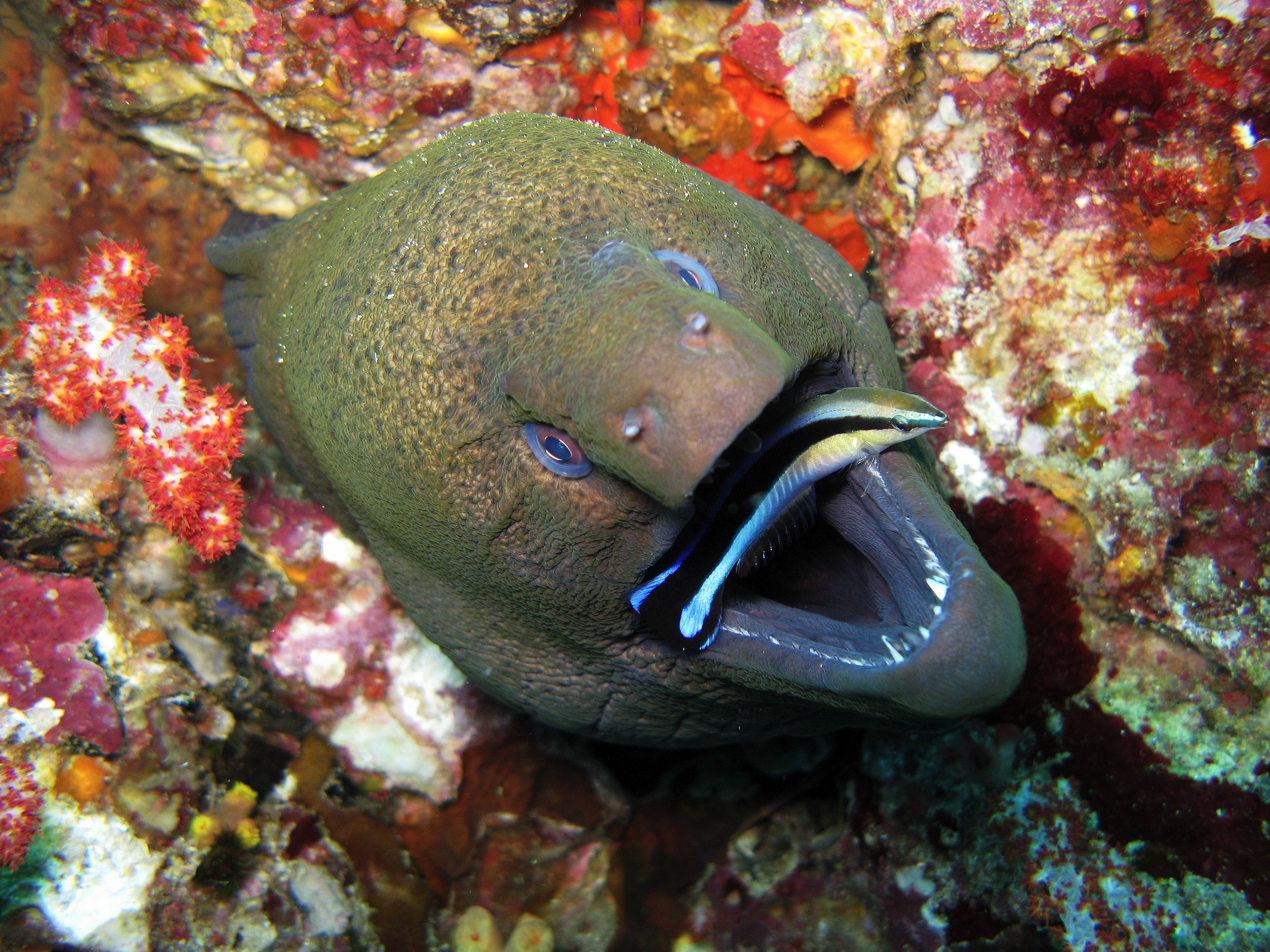
With a client giant moray eel

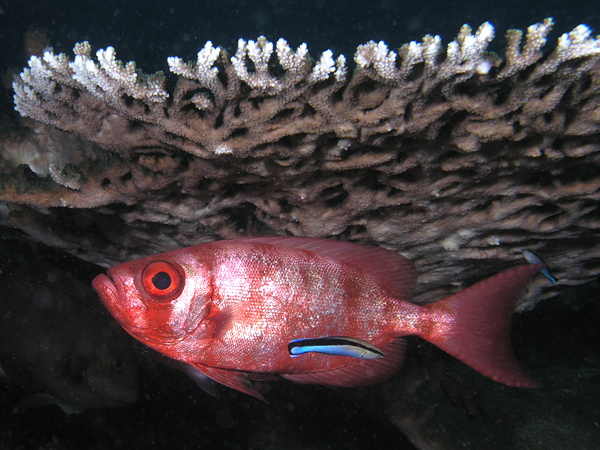
With Priacanthus hamrur

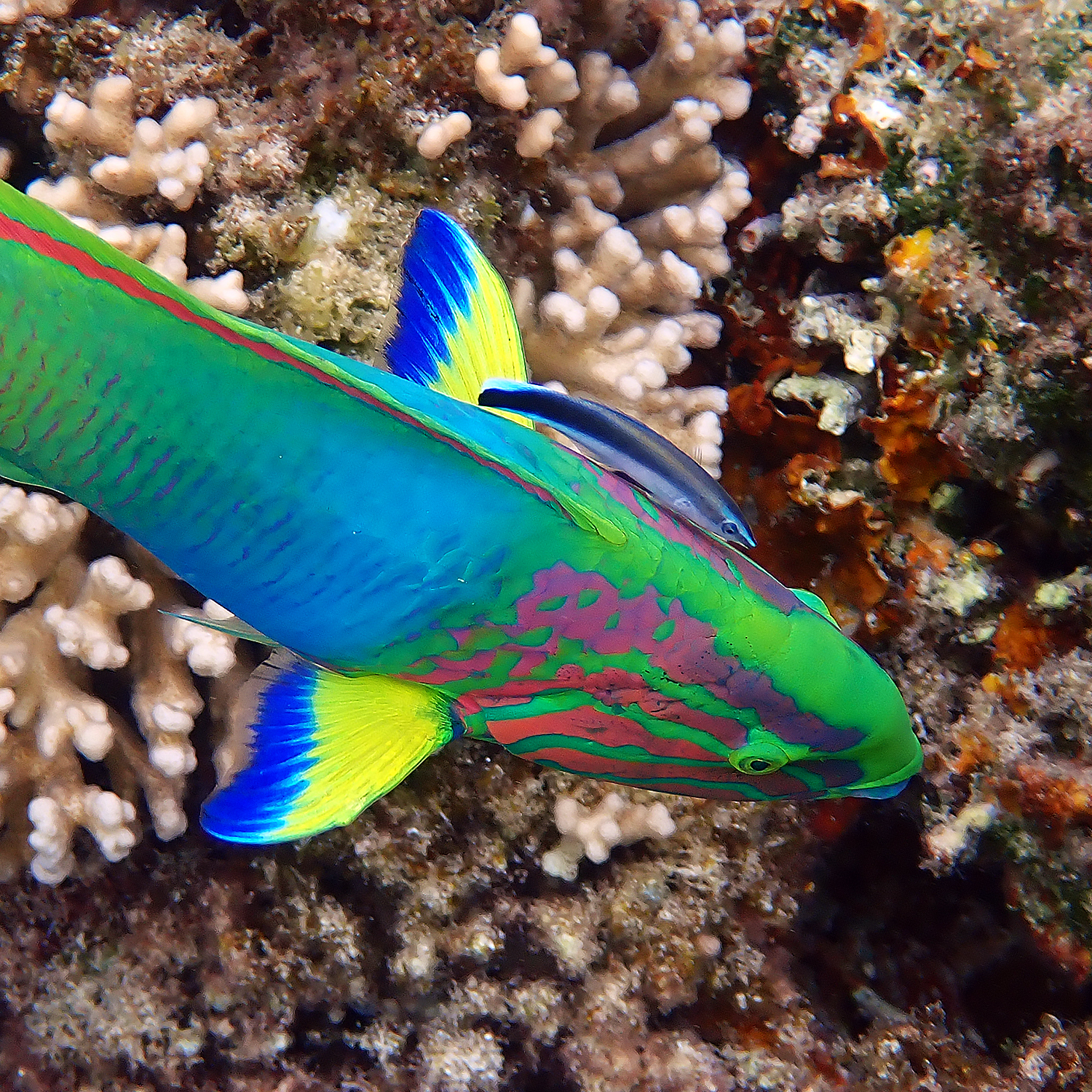
With a sunset wrasse

Video of L. dimidiatus cleaning the gills of an elongate surgeonfish

In different regions, the bluestreak cleaner wrasse displays various degrees of dependency on clients' ectoparasites as a primary food source. In tidal environments such as the Great Barrier Reef, it is a facultative cleaner that feeds more on corals than on fish clientele. Juvenile bluestreak cleaners are seen to bite their clients more often than the adults within that region, thus changing the dynamic of the known mutualistic relationship. In regions where the bluestreak cleaners are solely dependent on clients' parasites, though, fish that have access to cleaning services have better body condition than those without access. In the Marsa Bareika of the Ras Mohamed Nature Reserve, Egypt, the bluestreak cleaner wrasse live in specific sectors of the shallow reefs and are shown to rely on ectoparasites from species such as the brown surgeonfish and white belly damselfish. In this region, fish that visit cleaner wrasses have lower antibody responses than those without cleaner access, suggesting that cleaner access may decrease the need for active immunity.

=== Mimicry ===
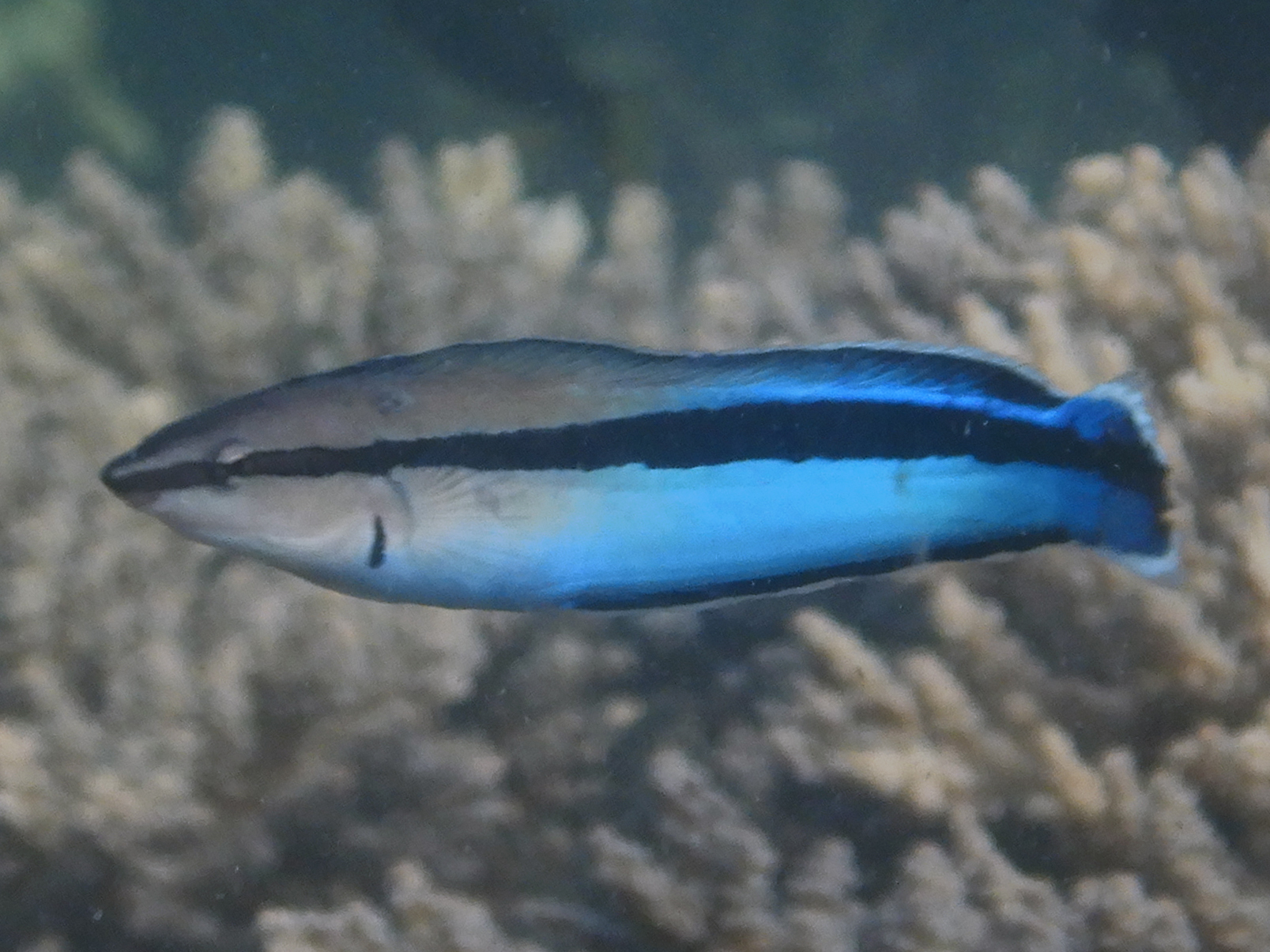
Aspidontus taeniatus, a sabretoothed blenny that mimics cleaner wrasses.

Some fish mimic cleaner wrasses. For example, a species of blenny called Aspidontus taeniatus has evolved the same behavior to tear small pieces of flesh or skin from bigger fish rather than rid them of parasites. Another species, the bluestreak fangblenny, Plagiotremus rhinorhynchos, mimics juvenile cleaner wrasse so its presence is tolerated by the cleaners, which is assumed to enable it to take advantage of the concentration of potential victims.

== Reproduction ==
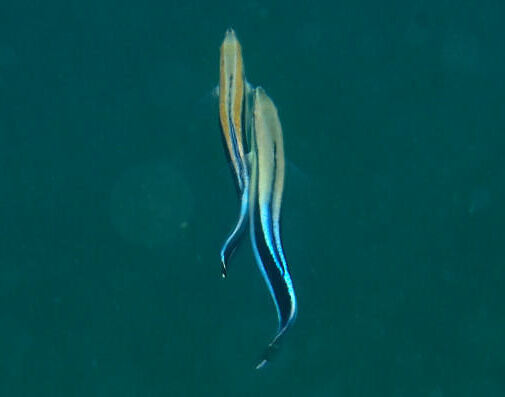
Courtship

Cleaner wrasse males defend specific living territories from other males in which they are able to have control over the females in those territories. When the dominant male no longer exists in that territory, one of the larger females is able to change sexes to take control over that territory.
