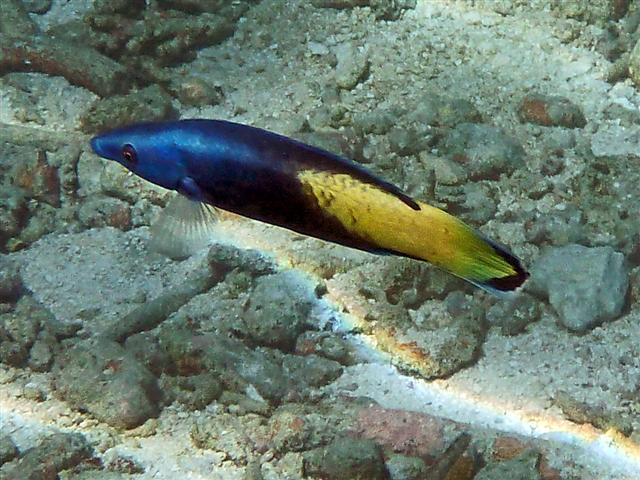

Conservation status
- Least Concern (IUCN 3.1)

Scientific classification
- Kingdom: Animalia
- Phylum: Chordata
- Class: Actinopterygii
- Order: Labriformes
- Family: Labridae
- Genus: Labroides
- Species: L. bicolor

Binomial name
- Labroides bicolor Fowler & B.A. Bean, 1928

Synonyms
- Fowlerella bicolor (Fowler & B.A. Bean, 1928)

= Labroides bicolor =

Species of fish

Labroides bicolor is a species of wrasse endemic to the Indian Ocean and the Pacific Ocean. It is known by various names including bicolor cleanerfish, bicolor(ed) cleaner wrasse, cleaner wrasse, two-color cleaner wrasse, and yellow diesel wrasse.

== Description ==
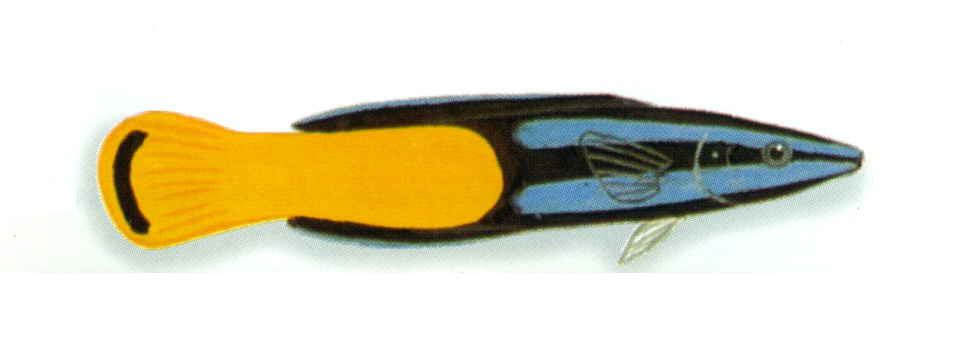
Detail of L. bicolor

The male is black with light color in the back of the body, the female is gray with black, and juveniles are yellow and black.

== Distribution and population ==
The countries and territories where it occurs include American Samoa, Australia, British Indian Ocean Territory, China, Christmas Island, Cocos Islands, Comoros, Cook Islands, Fiji, French Polynesia, Guam, India, Indonesia, Japan, Kenya, Kiribati, Madagascar, Malaysia, Maldives, Marshall Islands, Mauritius, Mayotte, Micronesia, Mozambique, Myanmar, Nauru, New Caledonia, Niue, Northern Mariana Islands, Oman, Palau, Papua New Guinea, Philippines, Réunion, Samoa, Seychelles, Singapore, Solomon Islands, Somalia, South Africa, Taiwan, Tanzania, Thailand, Tokelau, Tonga, Tuvalu, United States Minor Outlying Islands, Vanuatu, Vietnam, Wallis and Futuna, and Yemen.

Given its wide range, the exact population is unknown, but it is considered relatively common (except in the Philippines and Malaysia, where it is rare in some sites).

== Habitat and ecology ==
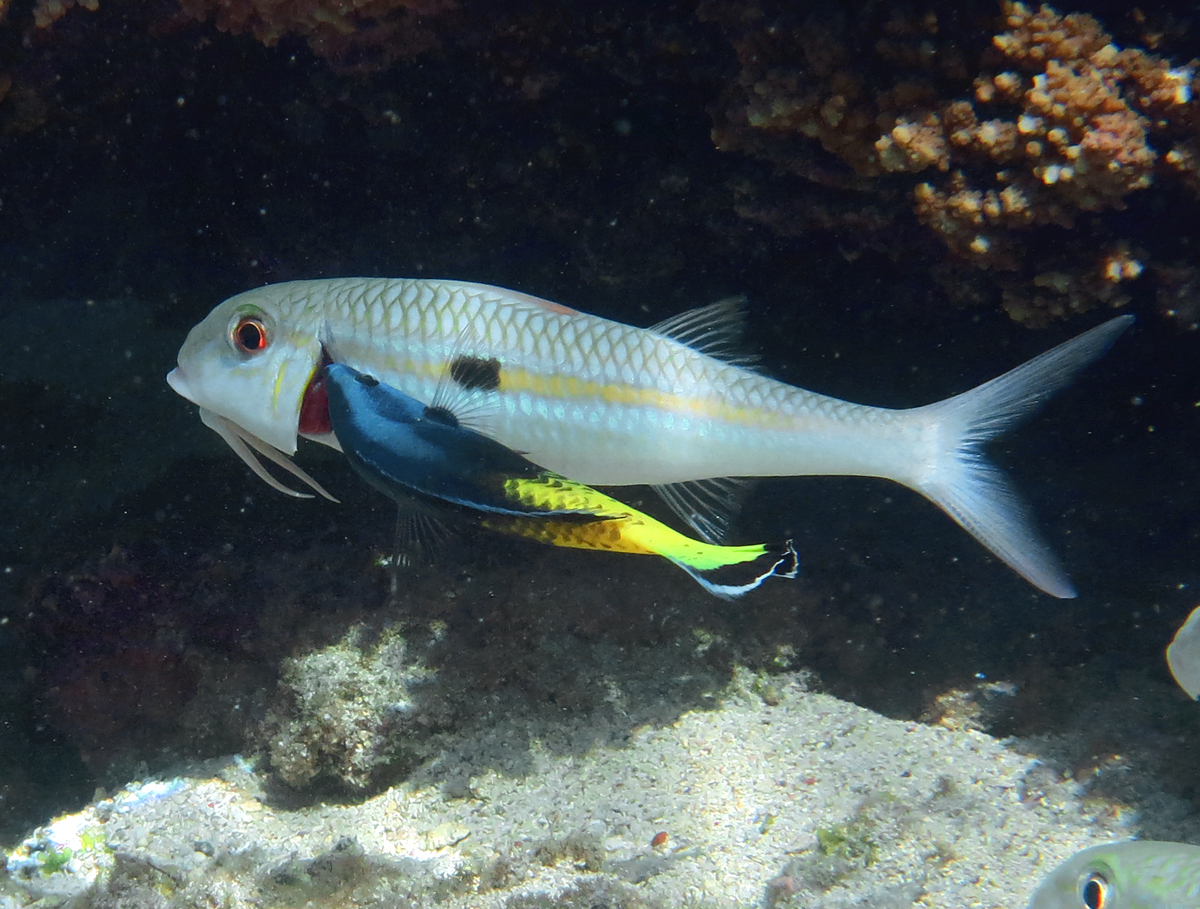
Labroides bicolor cleaning Mulloidichthys flavolineatus

It is found in abundant coral areas from sub-tidal reef flats to deeper lagoons and seaward reefs and has a depth of 40 meters. Unlike other cleaner wrasses, this fish spans larger areas to clean and is cleans more during the day when it is active. It, both individually and in groups, feeds on fish mucus and crustacean ectoparasites, such as the Gnathiidae, and has been found to clean and interact with a variety of species, including the striated surgeonfish, the brown tang, parrotfish, and the closely related bluestreak cleaner wrasse. It also cleans sharks and rays, such as the grey reef shark and the whitetip reef shark. At night, it may sleep in a mucous cocoon.

Like other cleaners, L. bicolor dances as a form of communication and may also dance to reduce client aggression.

== Conservation ==
It is listed as least concern by the IUCN, and it not considered to be significantly threatened, although it was once was targeted by the aquarium industry, and coral degradation may occur in some parts of its range. It occurs in several protected areas throughout its range, but research is needed on sustainable harvest and trade and the impact of collection.
