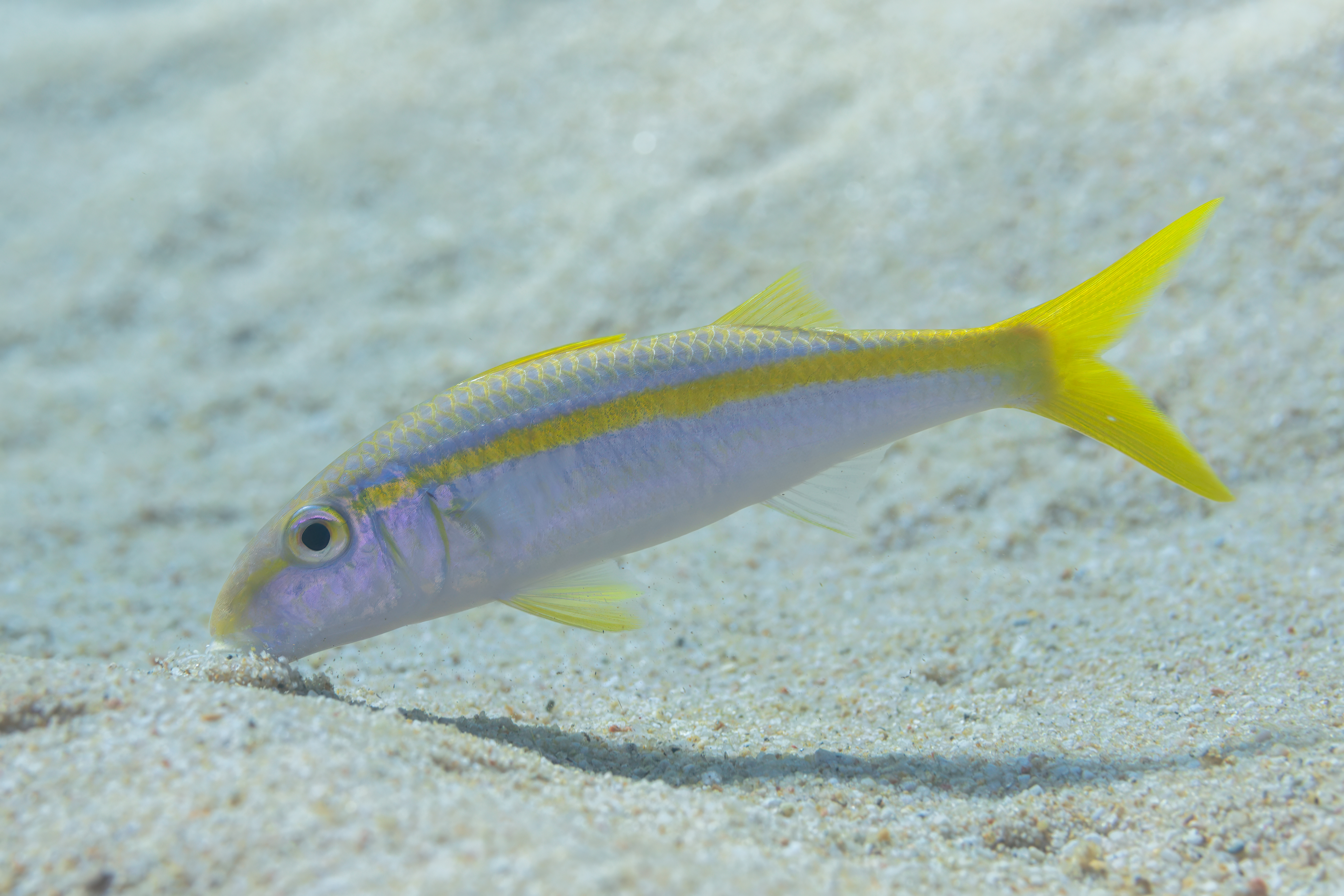
- Cabo San Lucas, Mexico

Conservation status
- Least Concern (IUCN 3.1)

Scientific classification
- Kingdom: Animalia
- Phylum: Chordata
- Class: Actinopterygii
- Order: Syngnathiformes
- Family: Mullidae
- Genus: Mulloidichthys
- Species: M. dentatus

Binomial name
- Mulloidichthys dentatus (Gill, 1862)

Synonyms
- Pseudupeneus dentatus (Gill, 1862); Pseudupeneus rathbuni (Evermann & Jenkins, 1891); Pseudupeneus xanthogrammus (Gilbert, 1892); Upeneus dentatus Gill, 1862; Upeneus rathbuni Evermann & Jenkins, 1891; Upeneus xanthogrammus Gilbert, 1892

= Mulloidichthys dentatus =

Mexican goatfish

Species of fish

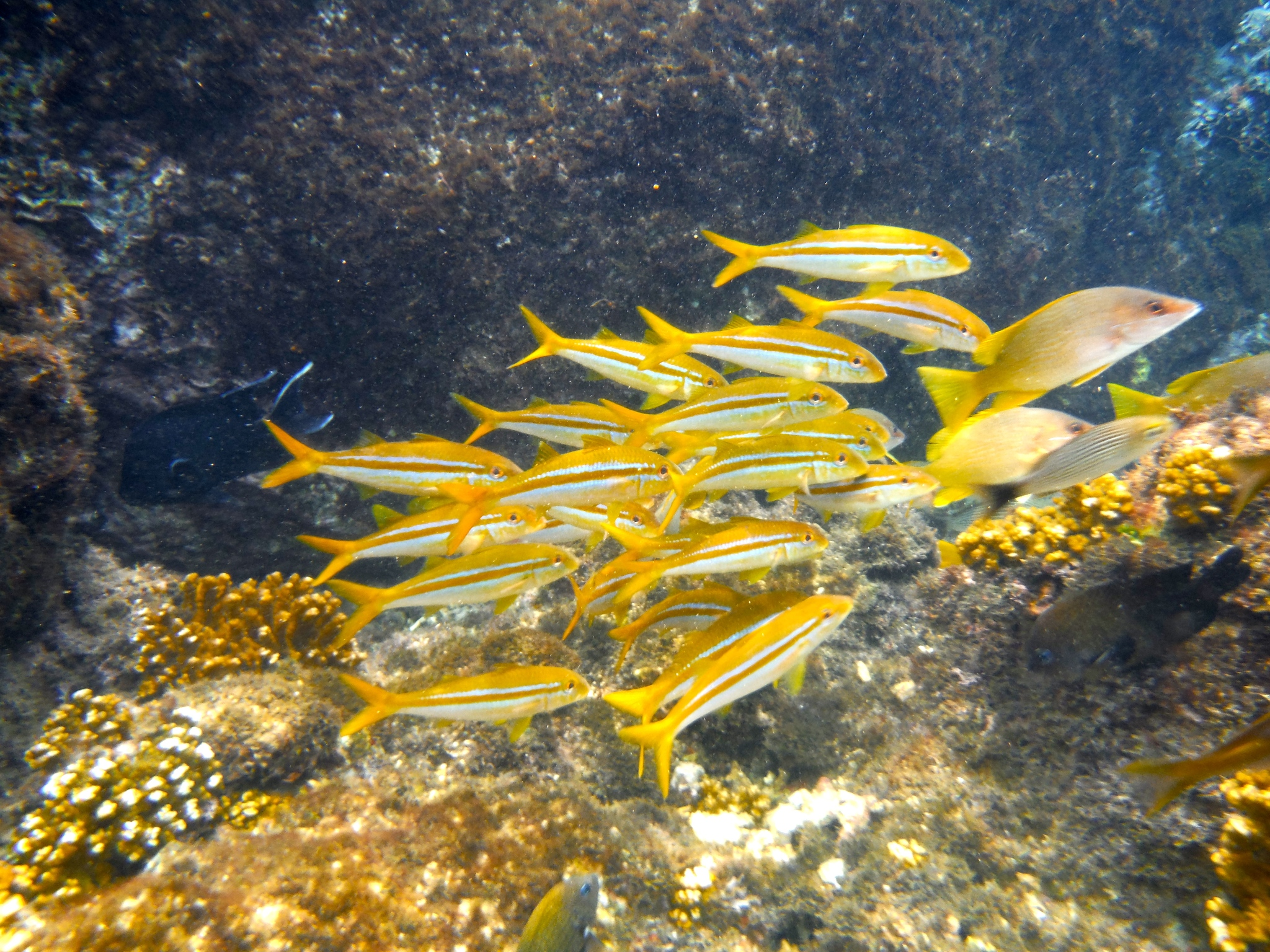
School in Montijo, Panama

Mulloidichthys dentatus, the Mexican goatfish, is a species of goatfish native to the Pacific Ocean.

== Taxonomy ==
M. dentatus was described in 1862 by Theodore Gill. The prefix "mulloid" in its genus name comes from the Latin mullus, meaning "soft," while "ichthys" is Greek for fish. Meanwhile, the specific epithet "dentatus" is word derived from the Latin, meaning "having teeth."

== Description ==
M. dentatus has a small mouth, which can be protruded. Its villiform teeth are also small, and it does not have teeth on the roof of its mouth. The snout is dull and its chin contains two sizeable barbels. Between its dorsal fins, it has six rows of scales. It is yellow throughout, except for its two blue stripes which run horizontally. Its maximum size is 40 cm (16 in).

It is similar to Mulloidichthys vanicolensis, but M. dentatus has shorter pectoral fins and barbels, and lesser gill rakers and pectoral fin rays.

== Distribution and habitat ==
M. dentatus is found in the Central-Eastern Pacific Ocean, from southern California to Peru. Its range includes the Galápagos Islands and is rare north of the Baja California peninsula. It is found at depths between 2–110 m (6.6–360.9 ft).

It mainly sticks to the coast and coral reefs, living in the sandy, muddy, and rocky bottoms near the shore. Despite this, its young are more fond of the open ocean. It can be found solitary, although it prefers to be in small schools. At night it can change its color to have red patches.

== Conservation ==
M. dentatus was evaluated by the International Union for Conservation of Nature in May 2007, which placed it as Least Concern on the IUCN Red List.
