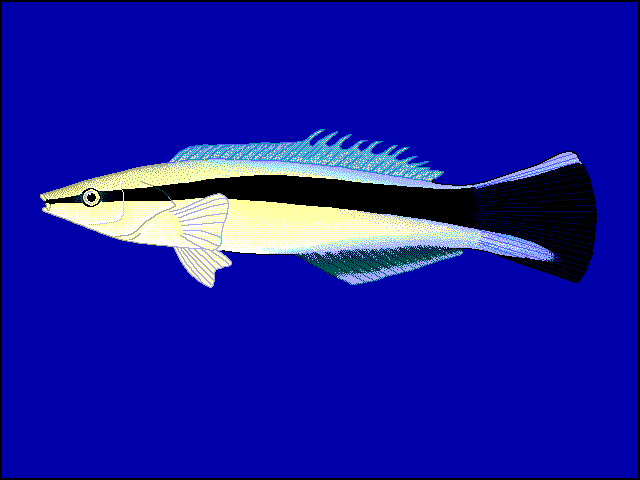
- Bluestreak cleaner wrasse (L. dimidiatus)

Scientific classification
- Kingdom: Animalia
- Phylum: Chordata
- Class: Actinopterygii
- Division: Teleostei
- Order: Labriformes
- Family: Labridae
- Subfamily: Julidinae
- Genus: Labroides; Bleeker, 1851

Type species
- Labroides paradiseus Bleeker, 1851

Synonyms
- Fissilabrus Kner, 1860; Fowlerella J. L. B. Smith, 1957

= Labroides =

Genus of fishes

Labroides is a genus of wrasses native to the Indian and Pacific Oceans. This genus is collectively known as cleaner wrasses, and its species are cleaner fish.

== Species ==
The currently recognized species in this genus are:

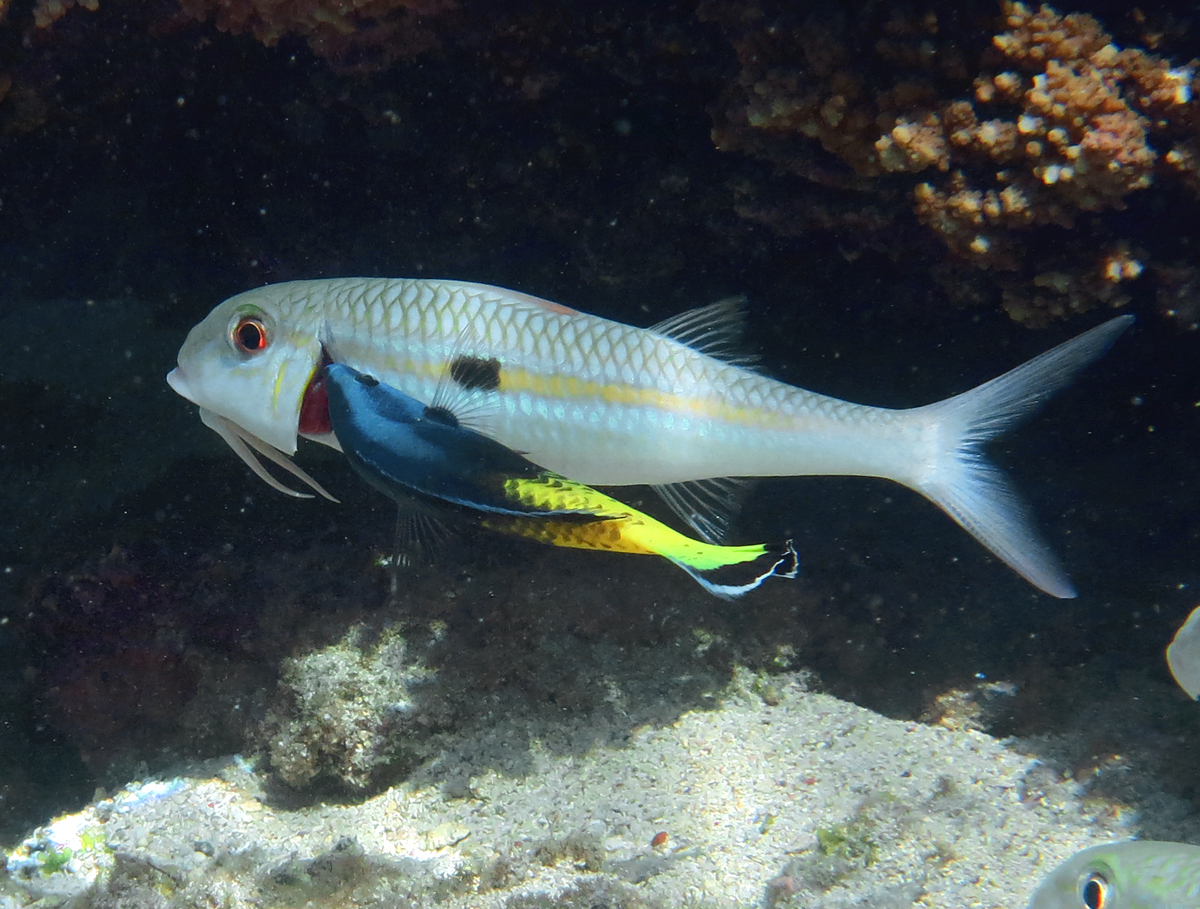
A bicolor cleaner wrasse (L. bicolor) cleaning a yellow stripe goatfish.

Species	Common name	Image
Labroides bicolor Fowler & B. A. Bean, 1928	bicolor cleaner wrasse	
Labroides dimidiatus (Valenciennes, 1839)	bluestreak cleaner wrasse	
Labroides flammulatus (Tea, Y. K, 2026)		
Labroides inopinatus (Tea, Y. K, 2026)		
Labroides pectoralis J. E. Randall & V. G. Springer, 1975	blackspot cleaner wrasse	
Labroides phthirophagus J. E. Randall, 1958	Hawaiian cleaner wrasse	
Labroides rubrolabiatus J. E. Randall, 1958	redlip cleaner wrasse	
