= Cleansing station =

Cleansing station may refer to:

- Baths and wash houses in Britain
- Chōzuya, a Shinto water ablution pavilion for a ceremonial purification rite known as temizu

== See also ==
- Cleaning station, a location where aquatic life such as fish congregate to be cleaned
