= Cleaning station =

Location where aquatic life congregate to be cleaned

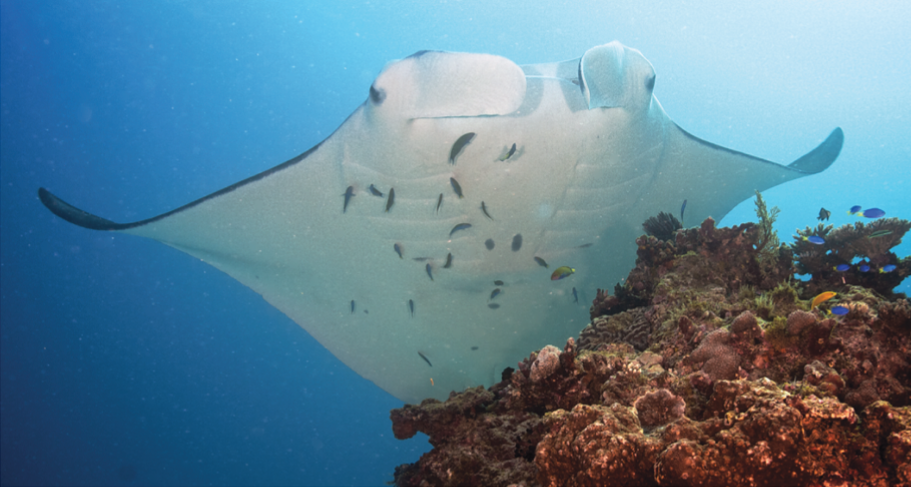
A reef manta ray at a cleaning station, maintaining a near stationary position atop a coral patch for several minutes while being cleaned.

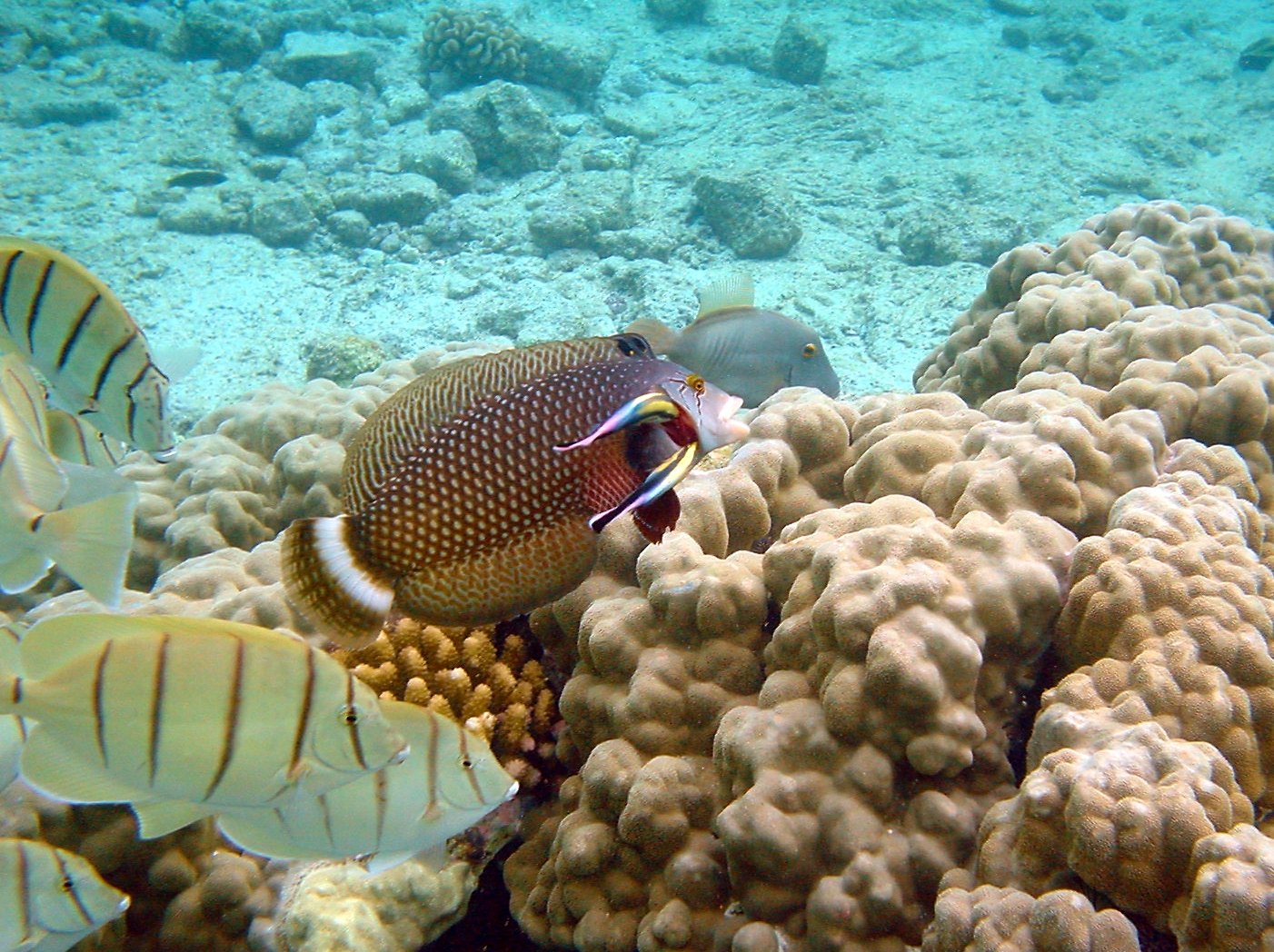
A rockmover wrasse being cleaned by Hawaiian cleaner wrasses on a reef in Hawaii. Some manini and a filefish wait their turn.

A cleaning station is a location where aquatic wildlife congregate to be cleaned by smaller organisms. Such stations exist in both freshwater and marine environments, and are used by animals including fish, sea turtles and hippopotamuses.

The cleaning process includes, but is not limited to, the removal of parasites (both externally and internally) and dead skin from the client's body, and is performed by various smaller animals, including cleaner shrimp and numerous species of cleaner fish, especially wrasses and gobies (Elacatinus spp.).

When a client approaches a cleaning station, they usually open their mouth wide or position their body in such a way as to signal that they wish to be cleaned. The cleaners then remove and eat parasites, dead skin etc. from their skin, even swimming into the mouth and gills of any fish being cleaned. This is a form of cleaning symbiosis.

It has been hypothesized that predator clients recognize cleaners by specific physical traits, such as the pattern of their skin colors; for example, cleaning gobies tend to exhibit full-body lateral stripes, unlike their non-cleaning counterparts, who tend to exhibit shorter lateral stripes; in the case of fish, cleaners also tend to be smaller due to them usually being juveniles.

Cleaning stations may be associated with coral reefs, located either on top of a coral head or in a slot between two outcroppings. Other cleaning stations may be located under large clumps of floating seaweed or at an accepted point in a river or lagoon. Cleaning stations are an exhibition of mutualism.

Cleaner fish also affect cultural diversity around coral reefs, since clients with larger home ranges can access and, thus, choose between, a variety of cleaning stations, visitor clients sometimes traveling long distances to a particular cleaning station. On the other hand, cleaning businesses have been damaged by predators disguising as cleaners in order to tear away scales or flesh of a victim.

== Gallery ==
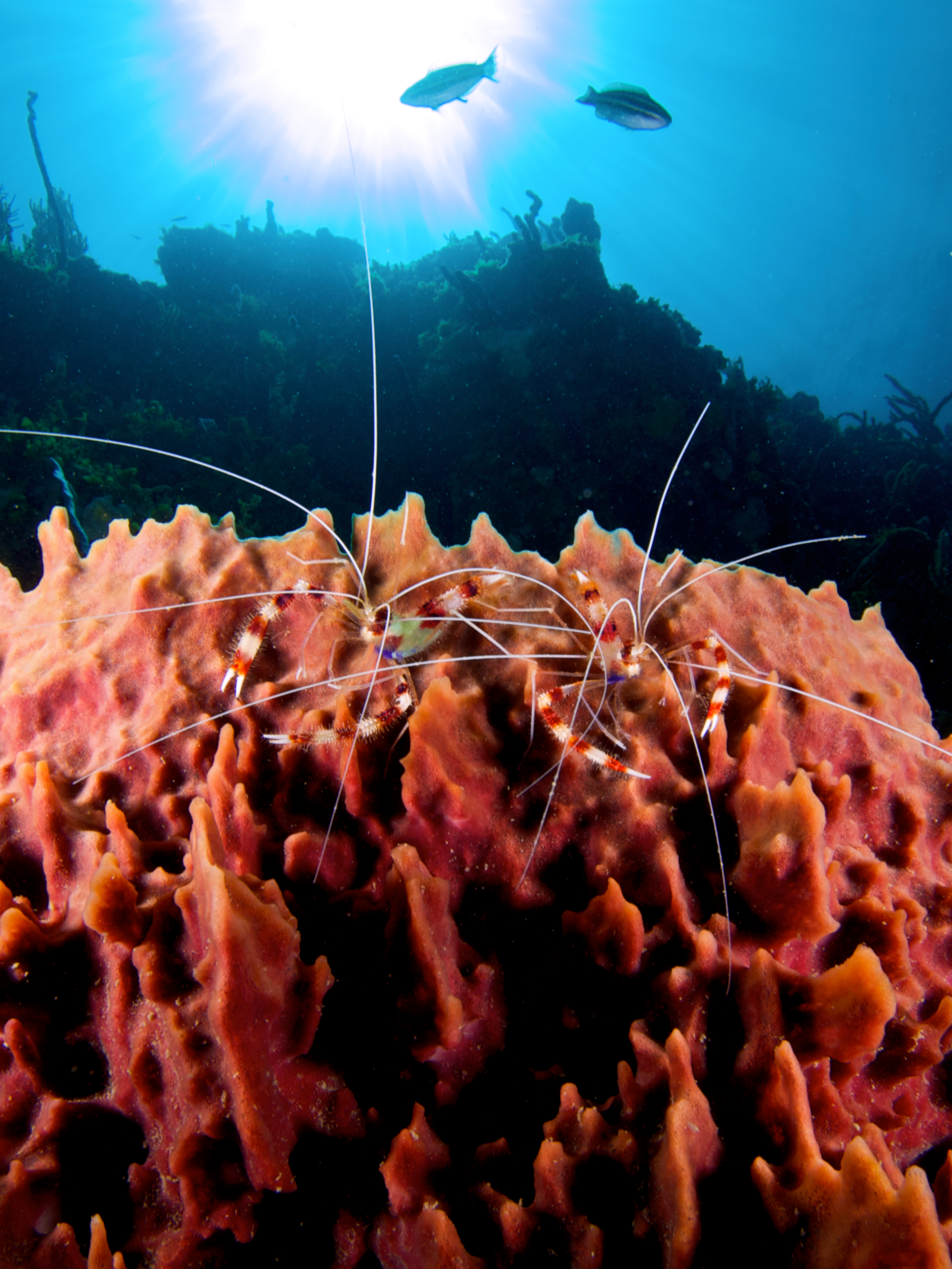
Stenopus hispidus (banded cleaner shrimp) on a Xestospongia muta (barrel sponge): The shrimp wait to remove external parasites and dead skin from visiting fish.

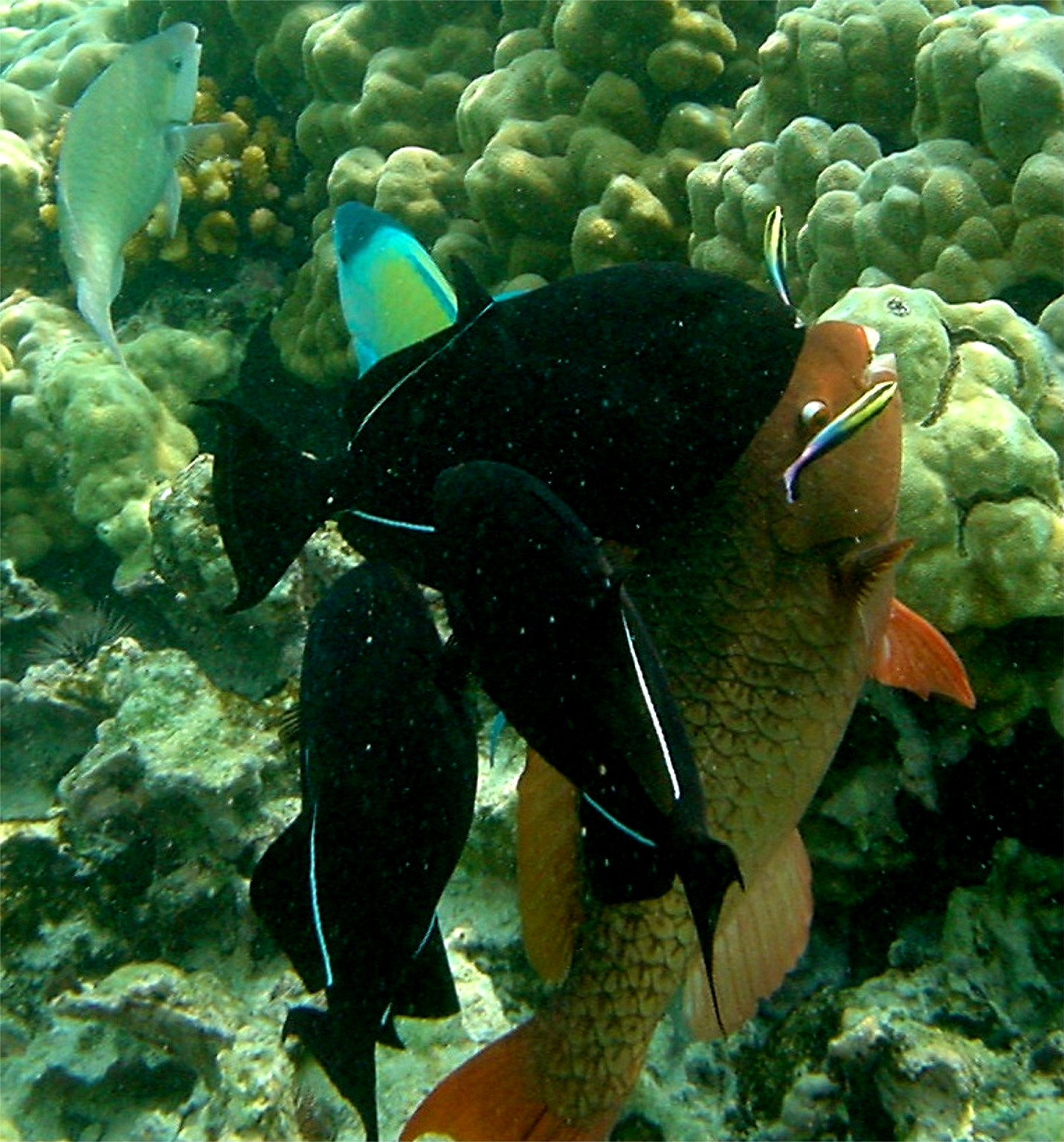
A parrotfish being cleaned by Hawaiian cleaner wrasses (Labroides phthirophagus) (photographed in 2005 in Hawaii)

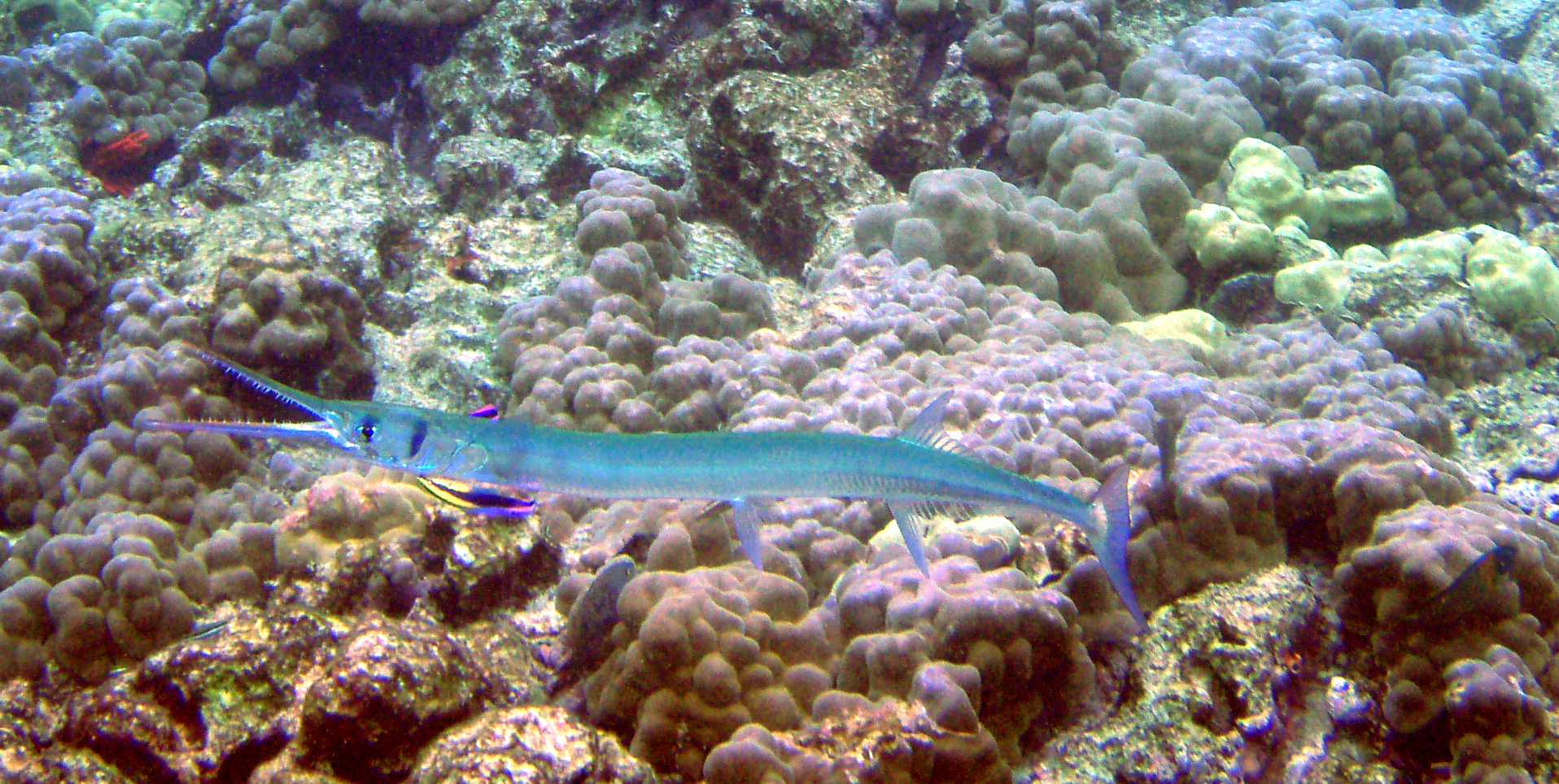
A needlefish being cleaned by L. phthirophagus

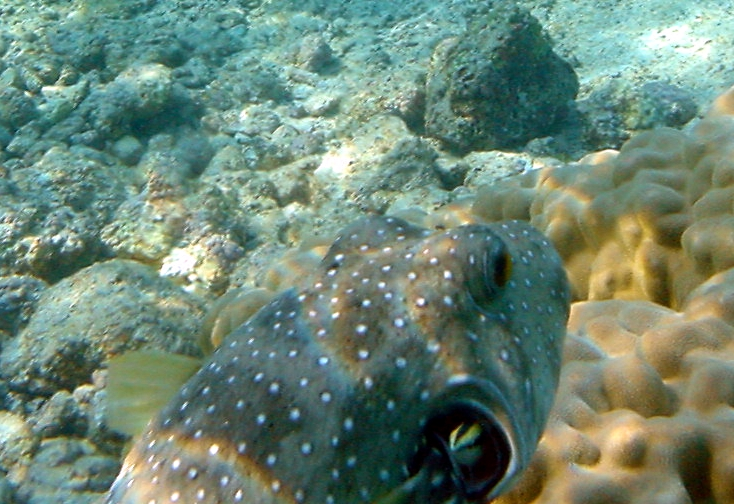
A Hawaiian cleaner wrasse inside the gill of a pufferfish

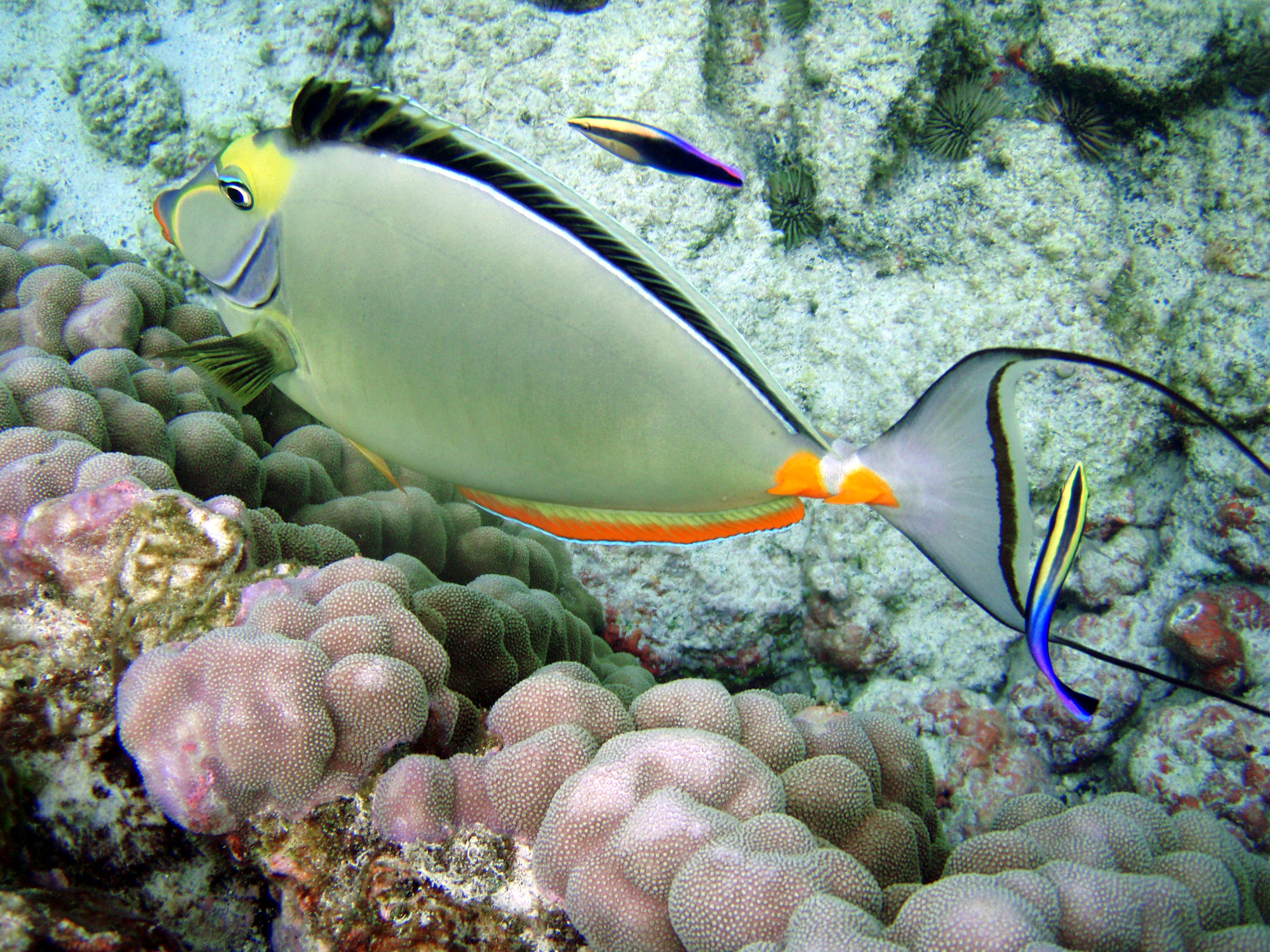
An orangespine unicornfish being cleaned by a Hawaiian cleaner wrasse

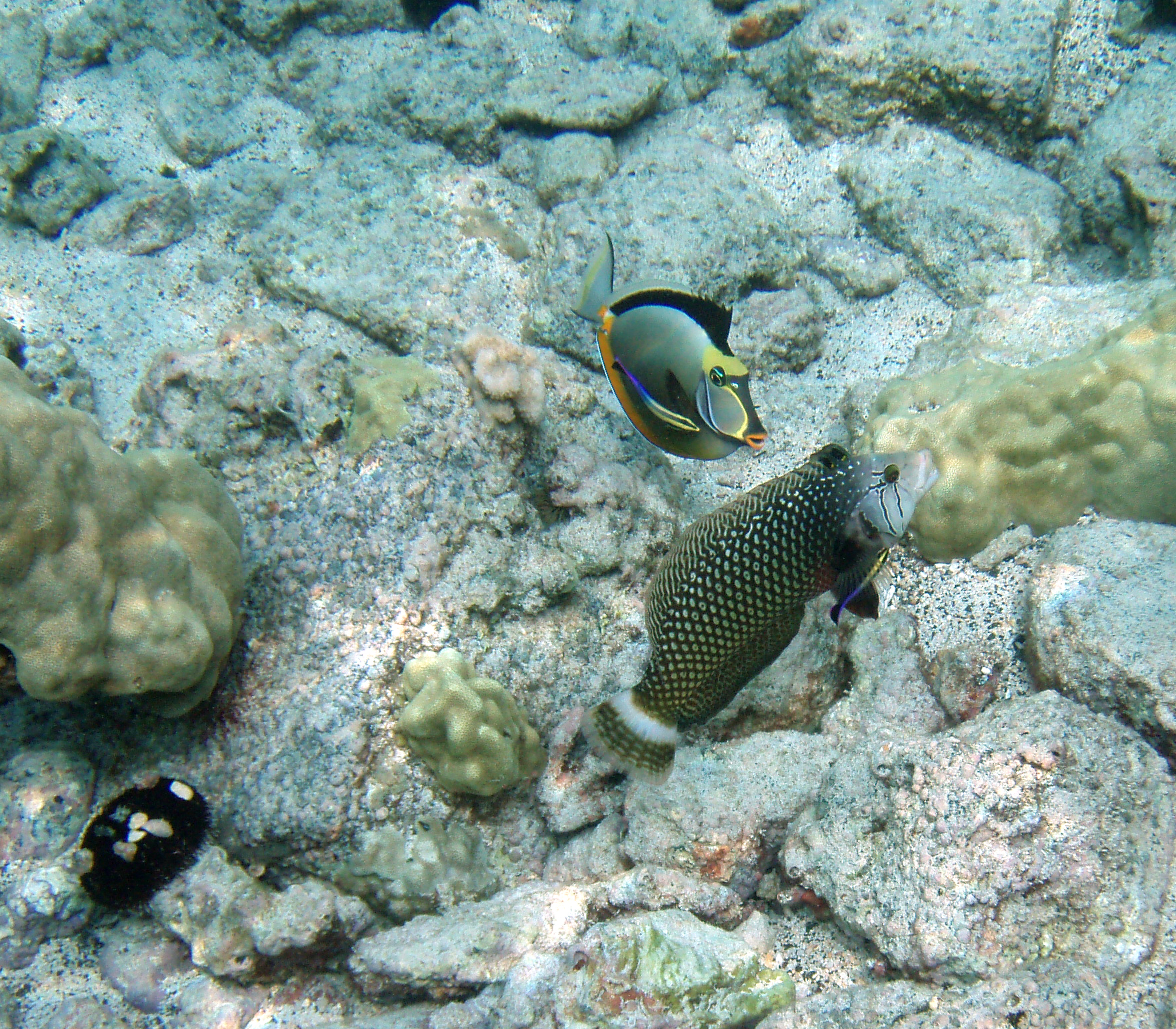
A rockmover wrasse gets cleaned by a Hawaiian cleaner wrasse while an orangespine unicornfish waits their turn

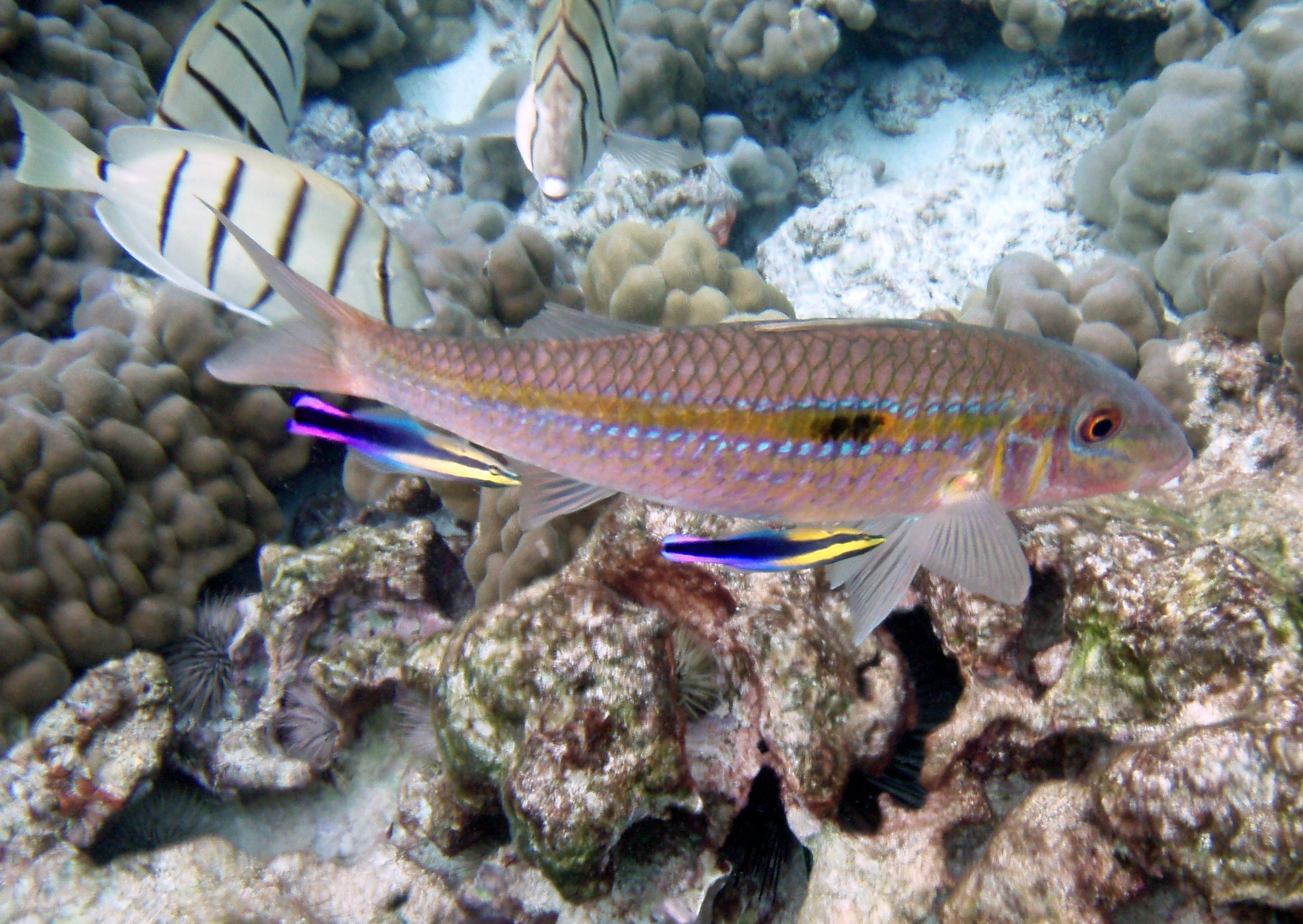
A goatfish (Mulloidichthys flavolineatus) at Kona, Hawaii, being cleaned by two Hawaiian cleaner wrasses

== See also ==
- Cleaner fish
- Cleaning symbiosis
- Doctor fish
- Lysmata amboinensis
