= Pennulituba =

Scientific classification
- Kingdom: Animalia
- Phylum: Platyhelminthes
- Class: Monogenea
- Order: Dactylogyridea
- Family: Ancyrocephalidae
- Genus: Pennulituba; Řehulková, Justine & Gelnar, 2010

Species
- See text

Genus of flatworms

Pennulituba is a genus of monogeneans belonging to the family Ancyrocephalidae (sometimes considered as belonging to the Dactylogyridae).

== Etymology ==
The generic name is derived from the Latin pennula ("winglet") and tuba ("tube"), referring to the male copulatory organ being characterized by a wing-shaped membrane.

== Host and Species ==
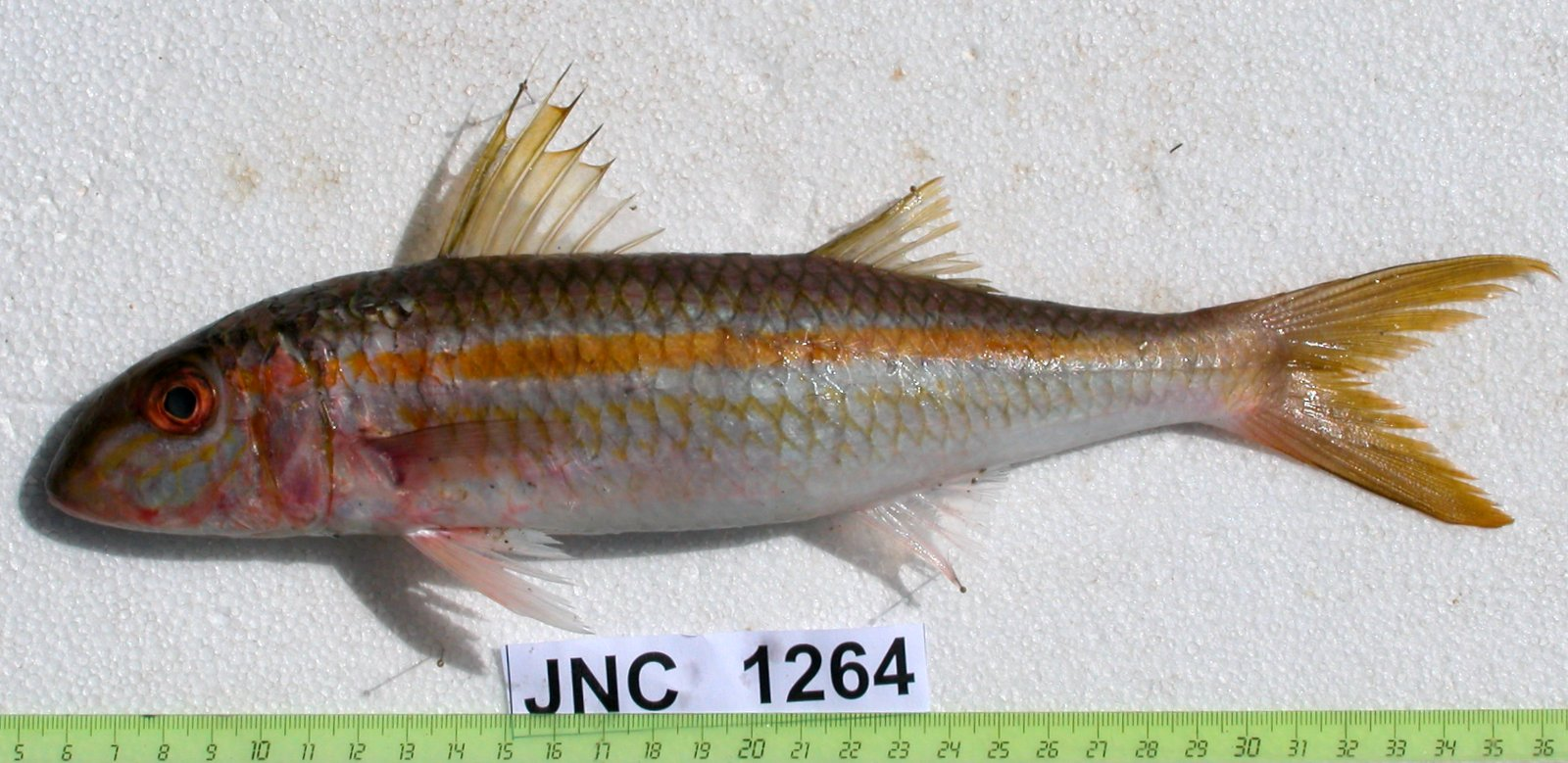
Mulloidichthys vanicolensis, the host of two species of Pennulituba

The two known species of the genus are parasitic on the gills of the yellowfin goatfish Mulloidichthys vanicolensis (Mullidae) and were collected in the waters of the Pacific Ocean off New Caledonia.

The following species are considered valid according to WorRMS:

- Pennulituba cymansis Řehulková, Justine & Gelnar, 2010
- Pennulituba piratifalx Řehulková, Justine & Gelnar, 2010 (type-species)
