= Mulloidichthys pfluegeri =

Scientific classification
- Kingdom: Animalia
- Phylum: Chordata
- Class: Actinopterygii
- Division: Teleostei
- Order: Syngnathiformes
- Family: Mullidae
- Genus: Mulloidichthys
- Species: M. pfluegeri

Binomial name
- Mulloidichthys pfluegeri (Steindachner, 1900)

Synonyms
- Mulloides pfluegeri

Species of fish

Mulloidichthys pfluegeri is a species of ray-finned fish in the family Mullidae, the goatfishes, are found in the Indo-Pacific Ocean. Also known as the pflugeri goatfish, rosy goatfish, and red weke.

== Description ==
The Orange Goatfish has an elongated body that's moderately compressed. It has an orange/pinkish body with white bars, orange fins, small eyes that are red in the iris and have a gold outline around it’s pupil. Full grown adults usually grow to about 22 inches and weigh at least 8 lbs. Their snouts are moderately long with a; small mouth; viliform teeth but with no teeth at the roof of their mouths. They have 2 separated dorsal fins with the first fin having 5 slender spines and the second having 9 soft rays while their anal spine has 7 soft rays; and their pectoral fins have at least 17-18.

== Ecology ==
They can often be found in groups when searching for it’s prey. Their diet consist of invertebrates; snails; worms; and mollusk's. They’re known to be harmless, but not found in fish markets.

== Distribution ==
This fish can be found in the Indo- Pacific Ocean. It has a wide range, mainly near Asia and the Oceania region like: Hawaii; Guam; Fiji; Japan; Indonesia; The Philippines; Taiwan; and many islands like Marshall Islands.

== Habitat ==
It lives between the depths of 30-110 meters in limestone bottoms, sandy floors, coral, reefs, and rubble floors. Their habitat must reach tropical temperatures between (74.12℉ - 82.94 ℉).
