= Volsellituba =

Scientific classification
- Kingdom: Animalia
- Phylum: Platyhelminthes
- Class: Monogenea
- Order: Dactylogyridea
- Family: Ancyrocephalidae
- Genus: Volsellituba; Řehulková, Justine & Gelnar, 2010

Species
- See text

Genus of flatworms

Volsellituba is a genus of monogeneans belonging to the family Ancyrocephalidae (sometimes considered as belonging to the Dactylogyridae).

== Host and species ==
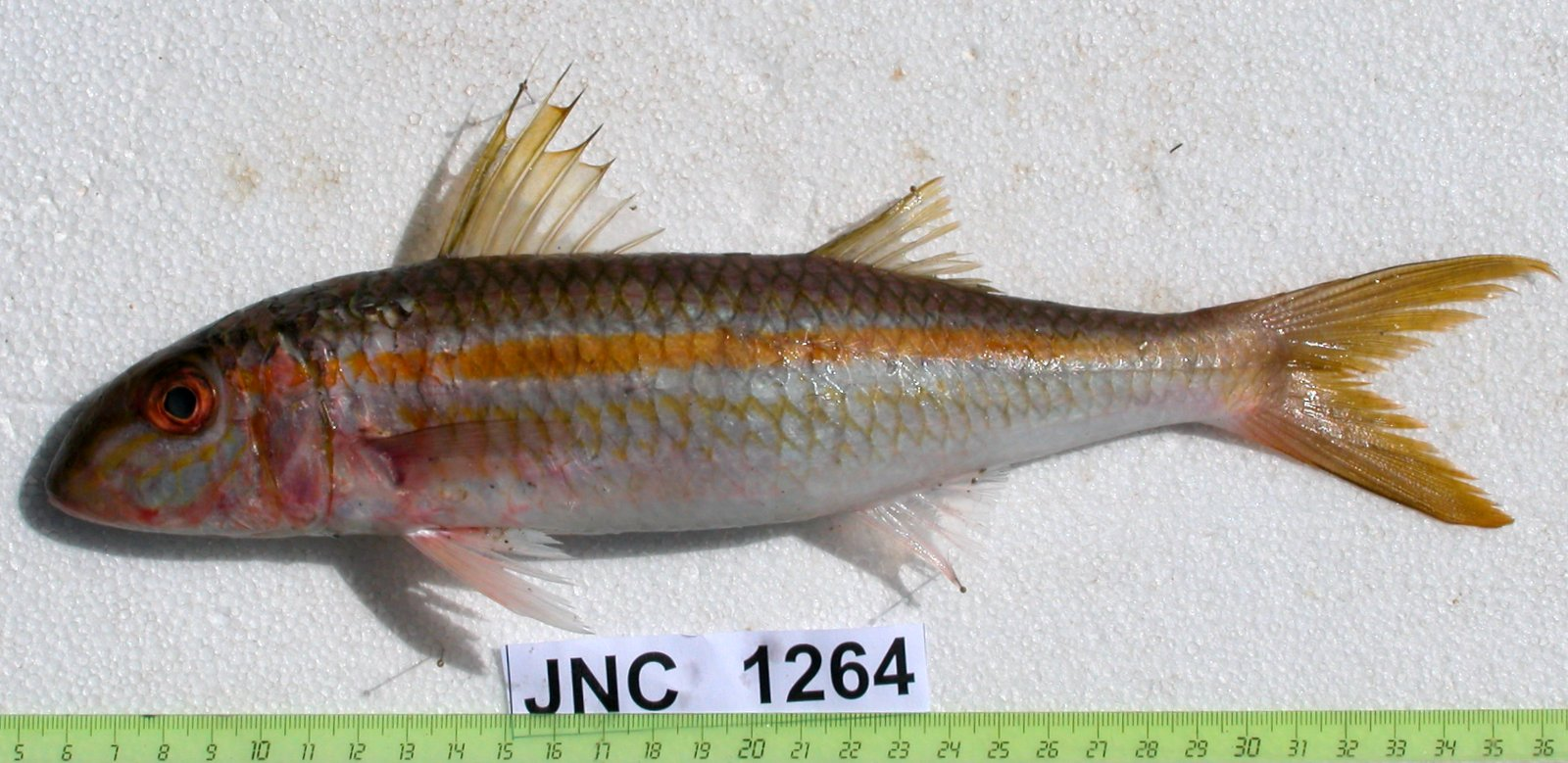
Mulloidichthys vanicolensis, the host of three species of Volsellituba

The three known species of the genus are parasitic on the gills of the yellowfin goatfish Mulloidichthys vanicolensis (Mullidae) and were collected in the waters of the Pacific Ocean off New Caledonia.

The following species are considered valid according to WorRMS:

- Volsellituba elephantina Řehulková, Justine & Gelnar, 2010
- Volsellituba nabla Rehulková, Justine & Gelnar, 2010
- Volsellituba orchidea Rehulková, Justine & Gelnar, 2010 (type-species)
