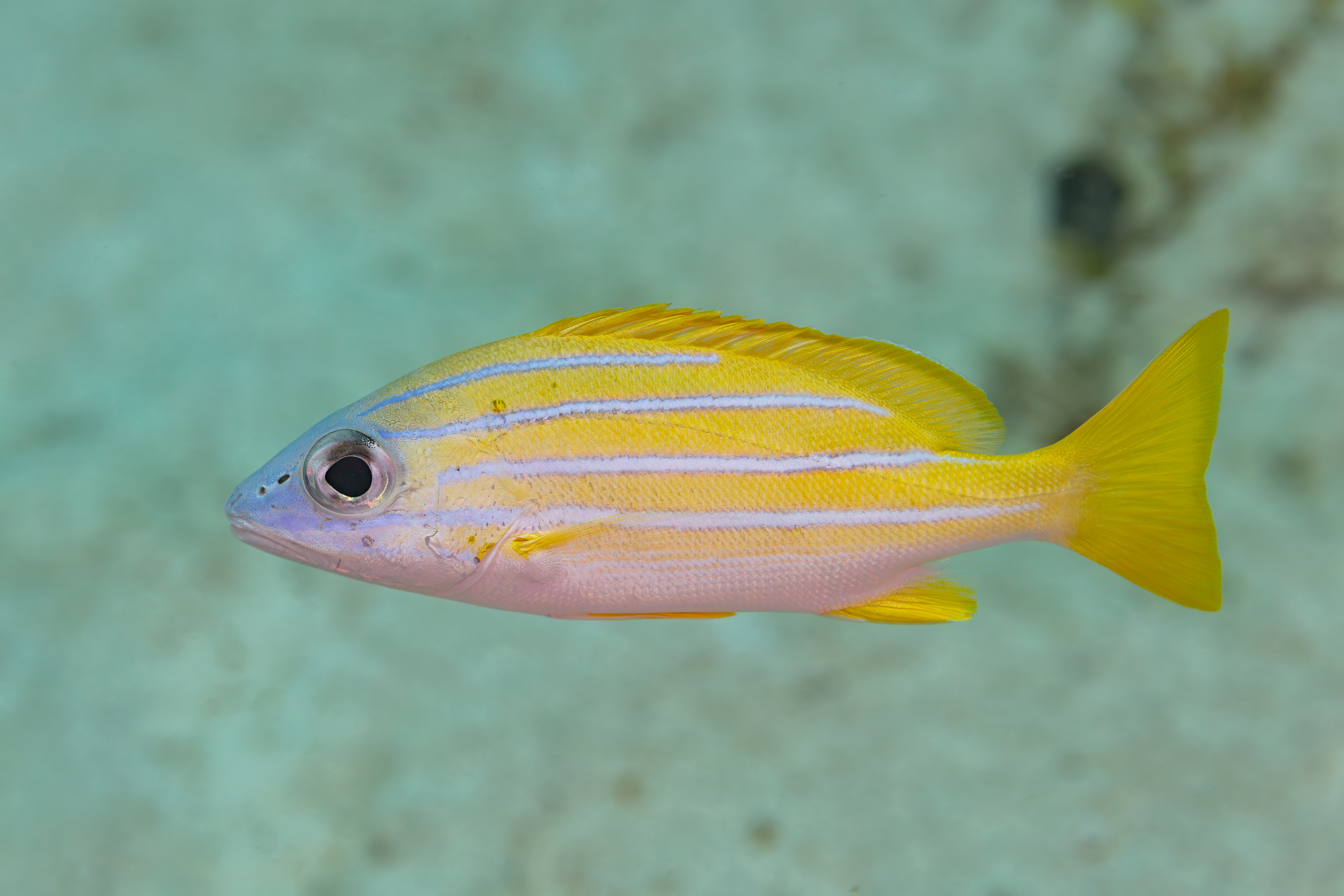

Conservation status
- Least Concern (IUCN 3.1)

Scientific classification
- Kingdom: Animalia
- Phylum: Chordata
- Class: Actinopterygii
- Division: Teleostei
- Order: Acanthuriformes
- Family: Lutjanidae
- Genus: Lutjanus
- Species: L. kasmira

Binomial name
- Lutjanus kasmira (Forsskål, 1775)
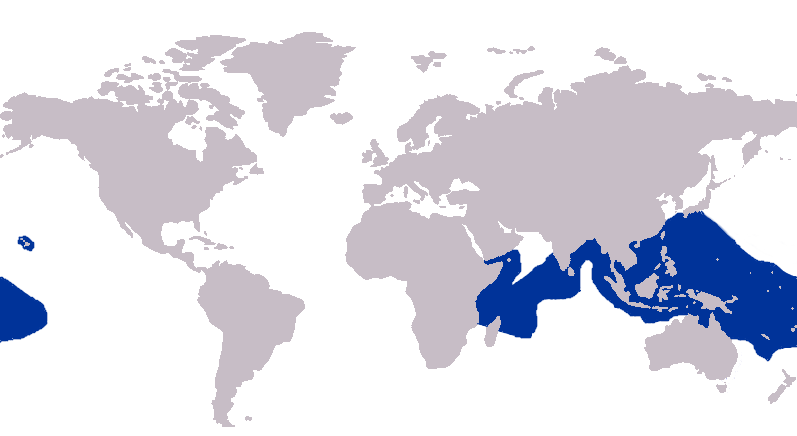
- Distribution of the bluestripe snapper

Synonyms
- Sciaena kasmira Forsskål, 1775; Diacope octolineata G. Cuvier, 1828; Mesoprion etaape Lesson, 1830; Perca lineata Gronow, 1854; Mesoprion pomacanthus Bleeker, 1855

= Common bluestripe snapper =

Species of fish

The common bluestripe snapper (Lutjanus kasmira), bluestripe snapper, bluebanded snapper, bluestripe sea perch, fourline snapper, blue-line snapper or moonlighter, is a species of snapper belonging to the family Lutjanidae. It is native to the Indian Ocean from the coast of Africa and the Red Sea to the central Pacific Ocean. It is commercially important and sought as a game fish. It can also be found in the aquarium trade.

== Taxonomy ==
The common bluestripe snapper was first formally described in 1775 as Sciaena kasmira with no type locality given but it is considered likely to be the Red Sea. FishBase attributes the species description to the Finnish-born Swedish-speaking explorer and naturalist Peter Forsskål but the Catalog of Fishes attributes as follows

"Fabricius [J. C.] in Niebuhr (ex Forsskål) 1775:46, xi [Descriptiones animalium (Forsskål)"

Catalog of Fishes then states that the valid binomial is Lutjanus kasmira (Fabricius, 1775).

The specific name kasmira is the Arabic word used for this fish in the Red Sea.

== Description ==
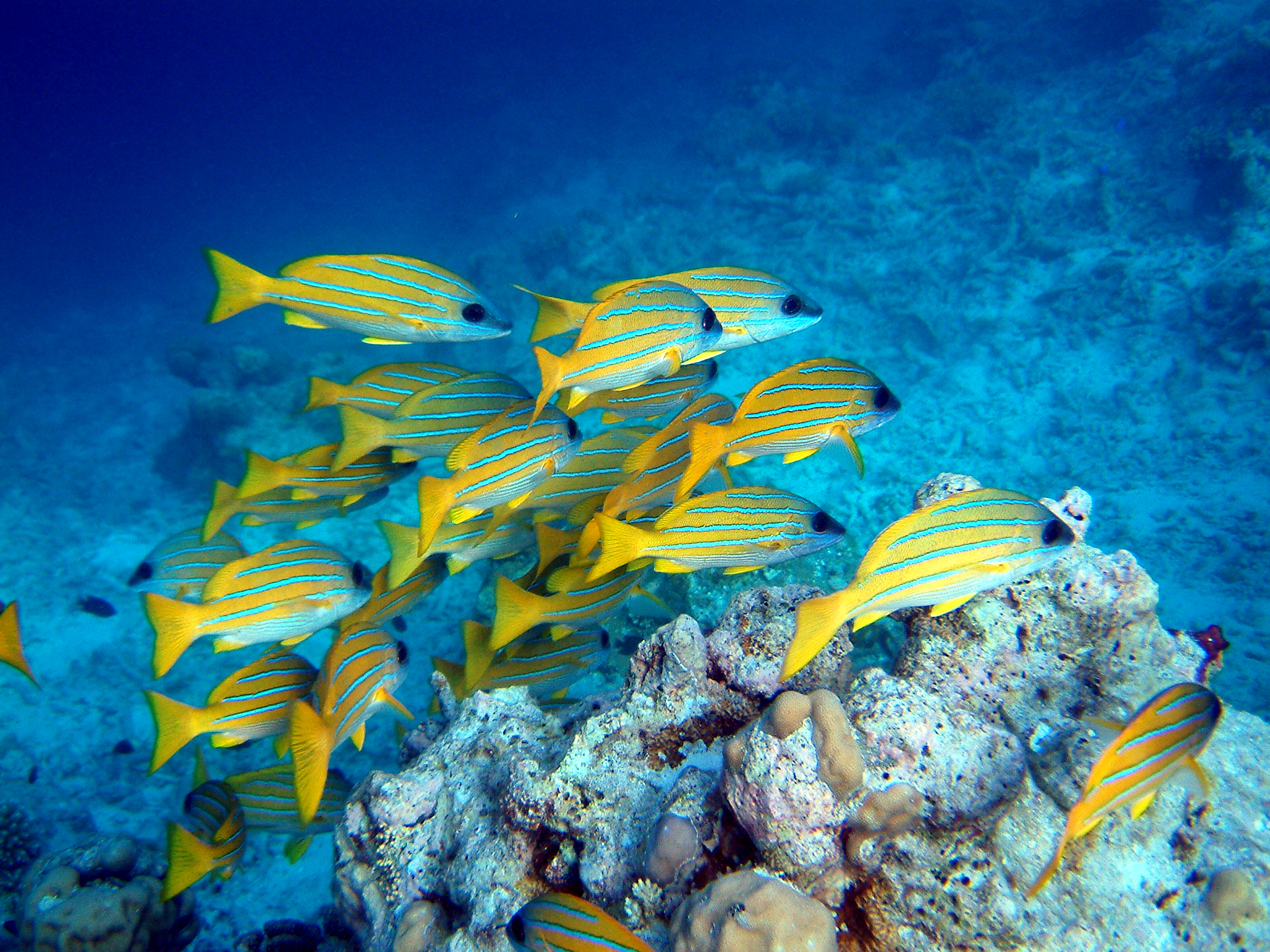
A school of bluestripe snappers in the Maldives

The body is moderately deep in profile, with the dorsal profile of the head steeply sloped, having a well-developed preopercular notch and knob. Identifying morphological features include the number of gill rakers on lower limb of the first arch, which number 13 or 14, with the total rakers on the first arch numbering 20 to 22. The dorsal fin consists of 10 spines anterior to 14 or 15 soft rays, while the anal fin has three spines and seven or eight soft rays. The pectoral fins have 15 or 16 rays, with the caudal fin being slightly emarginate. The row of scales on the back rise obliquely above the lateral line, which contains 48 to 51 scales. This species can reach a length of 40 cm (16 in), though most do not exceed 25 cm (9.8 in).

The color is probably the most diagnostic feature of the fish, especially when alive or fresh from the water. The back and sides of the fish are bright yellow, with the lower sides and underside of head fading to white. Four bright-blue stripes run longitudinally on the side of the fish, with several faint greyish stripes on lowermost part of sides. Most fins are yellow.

== Range and habitat ==
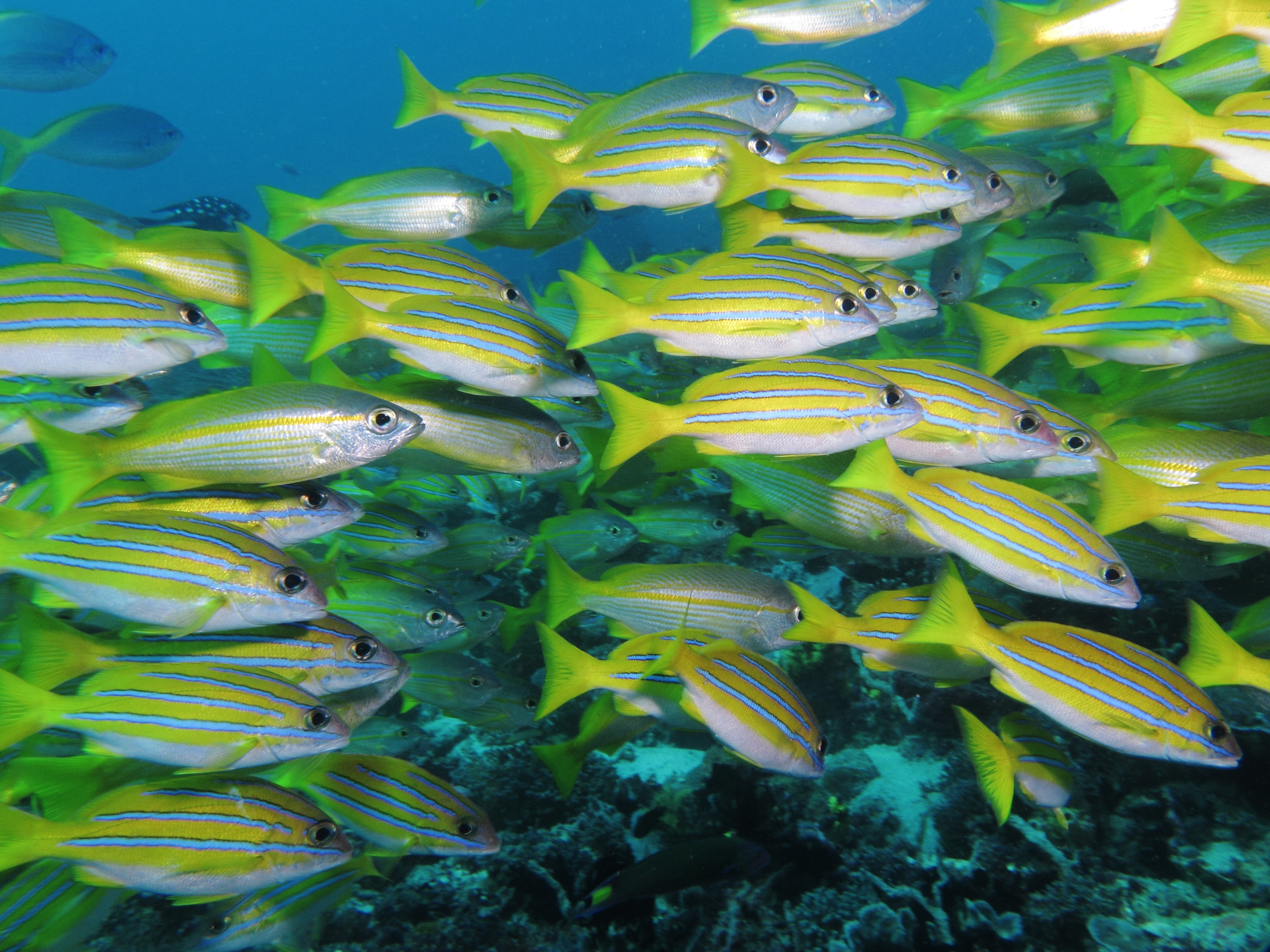
A school of bluestripe snappers at Komodo, Indonesia

The bluestripe snapper is one of the most widespread species of the Lutjanidae, ranging from the coast of Egypt bordering the Red Sea, south to Madagascar and east to India, China, Southeast Asia, Australia, and a number of Pacific islands.

Like many snappers, it inhabits coral reefs, occurring in both shallow lagoons and on outer reef slopes to depths of at least 60 m (200 ft), at depths reaching 180 m (590 ft) at the Marquesas Islands and 265 m (869 ft) in the Red Sea. In Hawaii, they spend some time over seagrasses and sandy substrates. They frequently gather in large aggregations around coral formations, caves, or wrecks during daylight hours.

The preferred habitat of the species changes with age, with young fish schooling on sandy substrates, while larger fish are more solitary, and inhabit deep reefs.

== Ecology ==
=== Mimicry ===
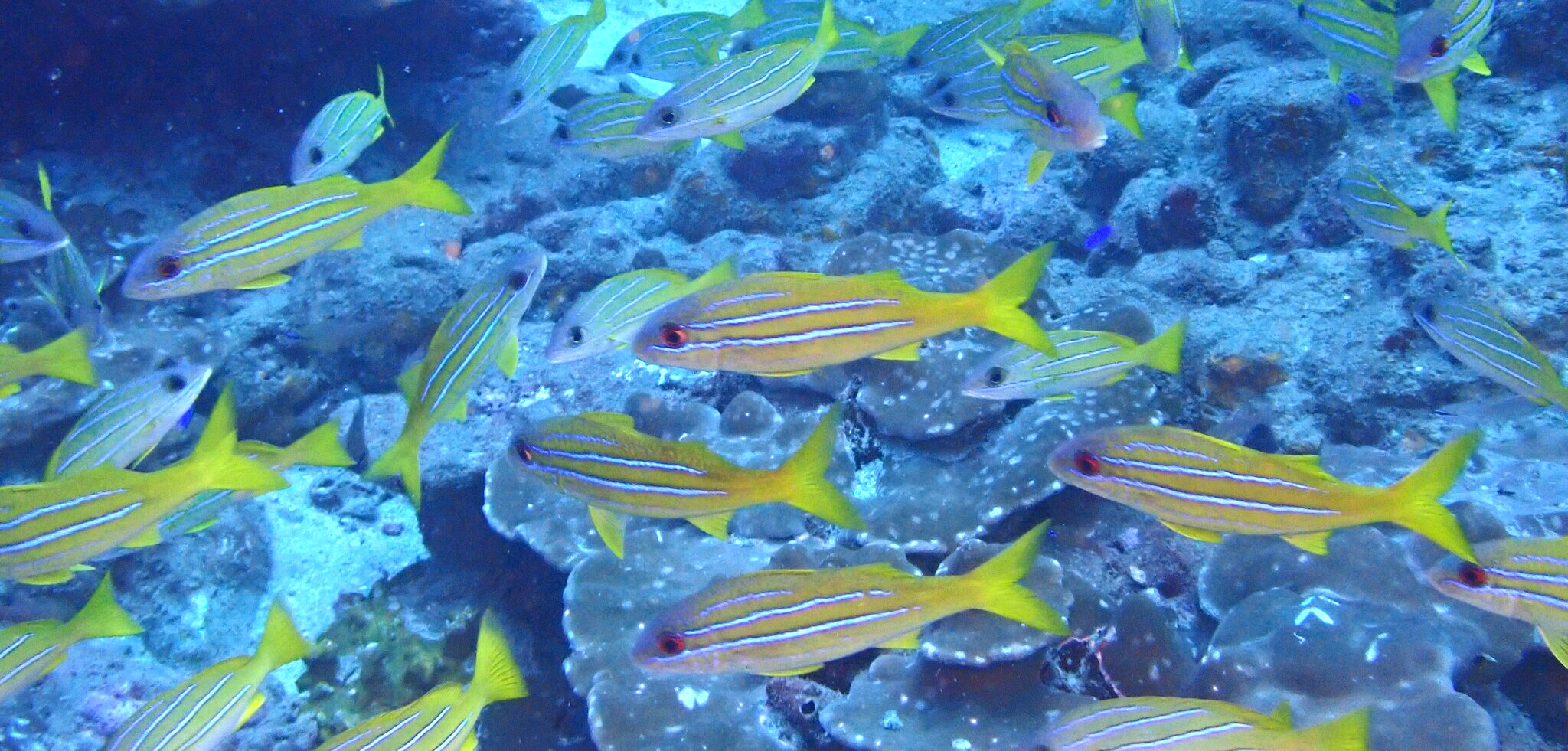
Schooling with Mulloidichthys mimicus in French Polynesia. Fish with almost straight edged tails are snapper, while fish with deeply forked tails are the mimicking goatfish.

The bluestripe snapper is part of an unusual mimicry relationship with the goatfish, Mulloidichthys mimicus, the colouration of which nearly exactly matches that of the snapper. The goatfish school alongside the snapper, with this behavior attributed to predatory protection. The goatfish are presumably a more preferred prey than bluestripe snapper.

=== Diet ===
The bluestripe snapper has a varied diet, feeding on fishes, shrimp, crabs, stomatopods, cephalopods and planktonic crustaceans, as well as plant and algal materials. Diets vary with age, location, and the prevalent prey items available locally.

=== Reproduction ===
The bluestripe snapper reaches sexual maturity at 20 to 25 cm (7.9 to 9.8 in). Spawning occurs throughout most of the year in lower latitudes, with peak activity reported for November and December in the Andaman Sea. Its eggs measure from 0.78 to 0.85 mm (0.031 to 0.033 in) in diameter and hatch when temperatures reach 22 to 25 °C (72 to 77 °F).

== Relationship to humans ==
=== Introduction to Hawaii ===
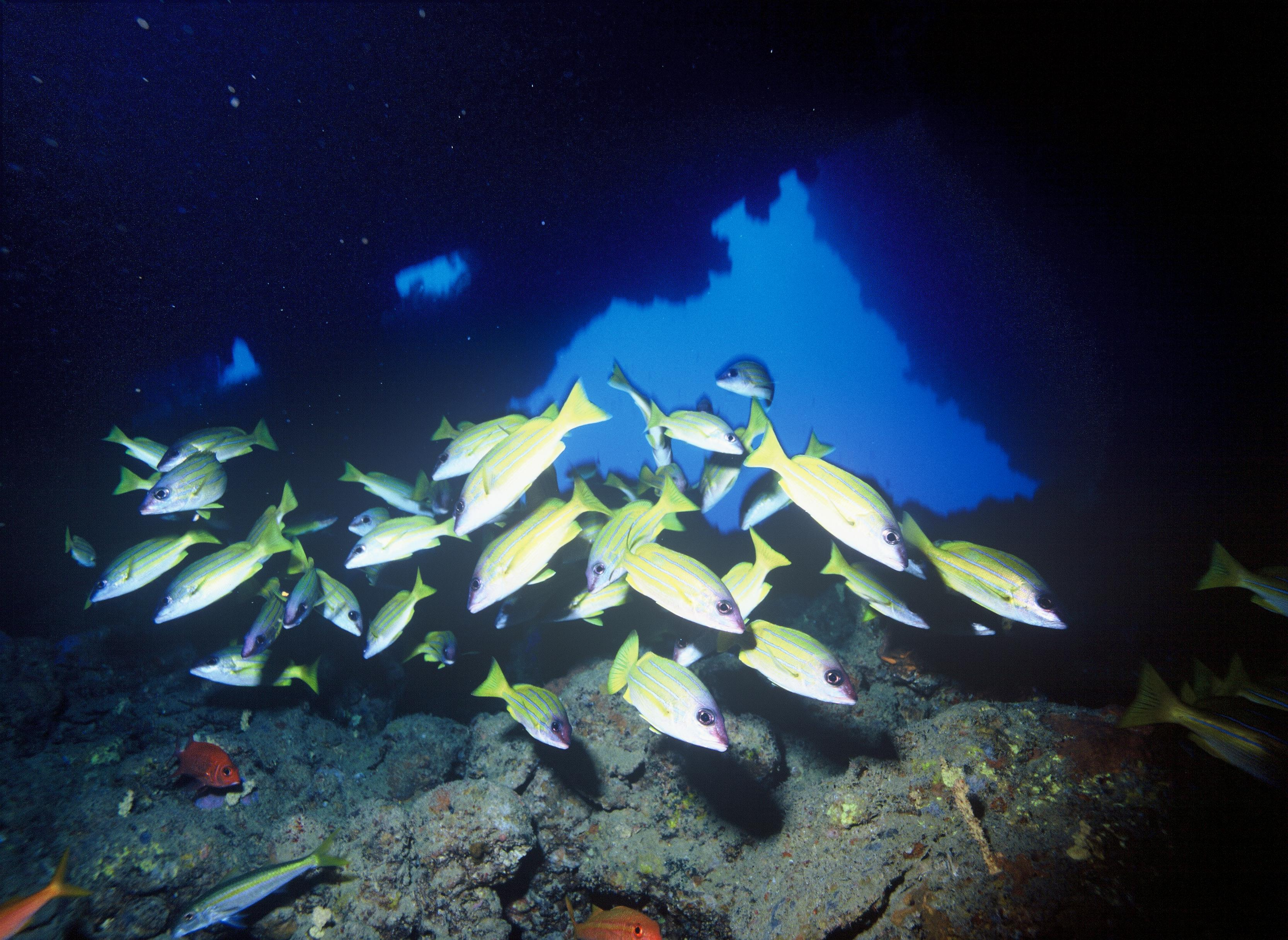
Bluestripe snappers occupying a cave in Hawaii

In the 1950s, investigators from the Hawaii's Division of Fish and Game conducted marine fauna surveys and found the Hawaiian ichthyofauna was dominated by herbivorous fishes, which they concluded were "a useless end in the food chain". Unlike many Pacific islands, Hawaii lacked any fish from the Serranidae or Lutjanidae families, so to increase recreational and commercial food fishing opportunities, and fill a perceived 'vacant ecological niche', collections of 11 species of snappers and groupers were imported from Mexico, Kiribati, the Marquesas Islands, and Moorea, and introduced to Hawaii. Only three species thrived, dominated by the bluestripe snapper, now occupying many of the Hawaiian Islands.

In the following years, fishers and ecologists raised concerns that the snapper would outcompete other fish for space and food, as well as prey upon them. Snapper may be competitively dominant over native yellow-fin goatfish, Mulloidichthys vanicolensis, for sheltering space on the reef. This is likely only the case in situations where both are present in high densities.

A parasitic nematode, Spirocamallanus istiblenni, may have been introduced to Hawaiian waters when the fish were released. The addition of this parasite may have affected native fishes, which may not have been subject to the species before the introduction of L. kasmira.

The species has also failed to become important as a food fish and commercial resource for the islands because of low market prices. Since it competes with more commercially valuable fish, most fishers view it as a pest. Since 2008, Hawaii has conducted a series of spearfishing contests that targeted bluestripes, along with blue-spotted groupers and black tail snappers with the intent of removing these fish from Hawaiian waters.

=== Commercial fishery ===
The bluestripe snapper is commonly taken throughout its range by handlines, traps, and gill nets. It is usually marketed fresh, and is common in the markets of many countries. It is one of the principal species in the Hawaiian handline fishery, but as noted above, it fetches low prices at market.
