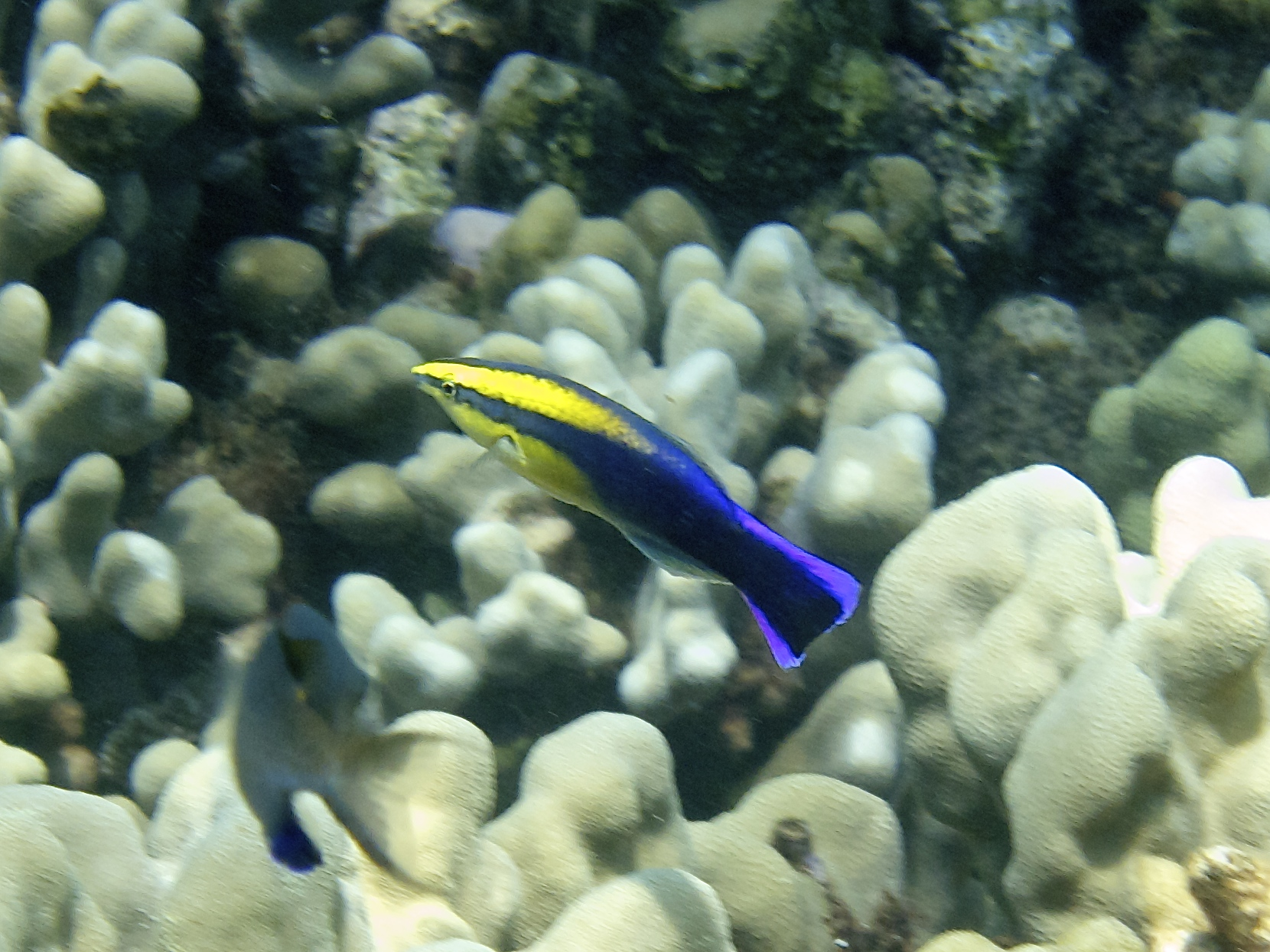

Conservation status
- Least Concern (IUCN 3.1)

Scientific classification
- Kingdom: Animalia
- Phylum: Chordata
- Class: Actinopterygii
- Order: Labriformes
- Family: Labridae
- Genus: Labroides
- Species: L. phthirophagus

Binomial name
- Labroides phthirophagus J. E. Randall, 1958

= Hawaiian cleaner wrasse =

Species of fish

The Hawaiian cleaner wrasse or golden cleaner wrasse (Labroides phthirophagus), is a species of wrasse (genus Labroides) found in the waters surrounding the Hawaiian Islands. The fish is endemic to Hawaii. These cleaner fish inhabit coral reefs, setting up a territory referred to as a cleaning station. They obtain a diet of small crustacean parasites by removing them from other reef fish in a cleaning symbiosis.

== Description ==
The Hawaiian cleaner wrasse grows to a maximum length of about 12 cm (5 in). This fish is strikingly coloured; the anterior part is golden, with a dark lateral stripe running from the eye to the tail, becoming wider at the back. The posterior part of the fish has purple and violet colouration on the fins.

== Distribution and habitat ==
This fish is endemic to the Hawaiian Islands and nearby Johnston Atoll. It is typically found on coral and rocky reefs, but avoids the surge zone. It is found at depths down to about 90 m (300 ft).

== Ecology ==
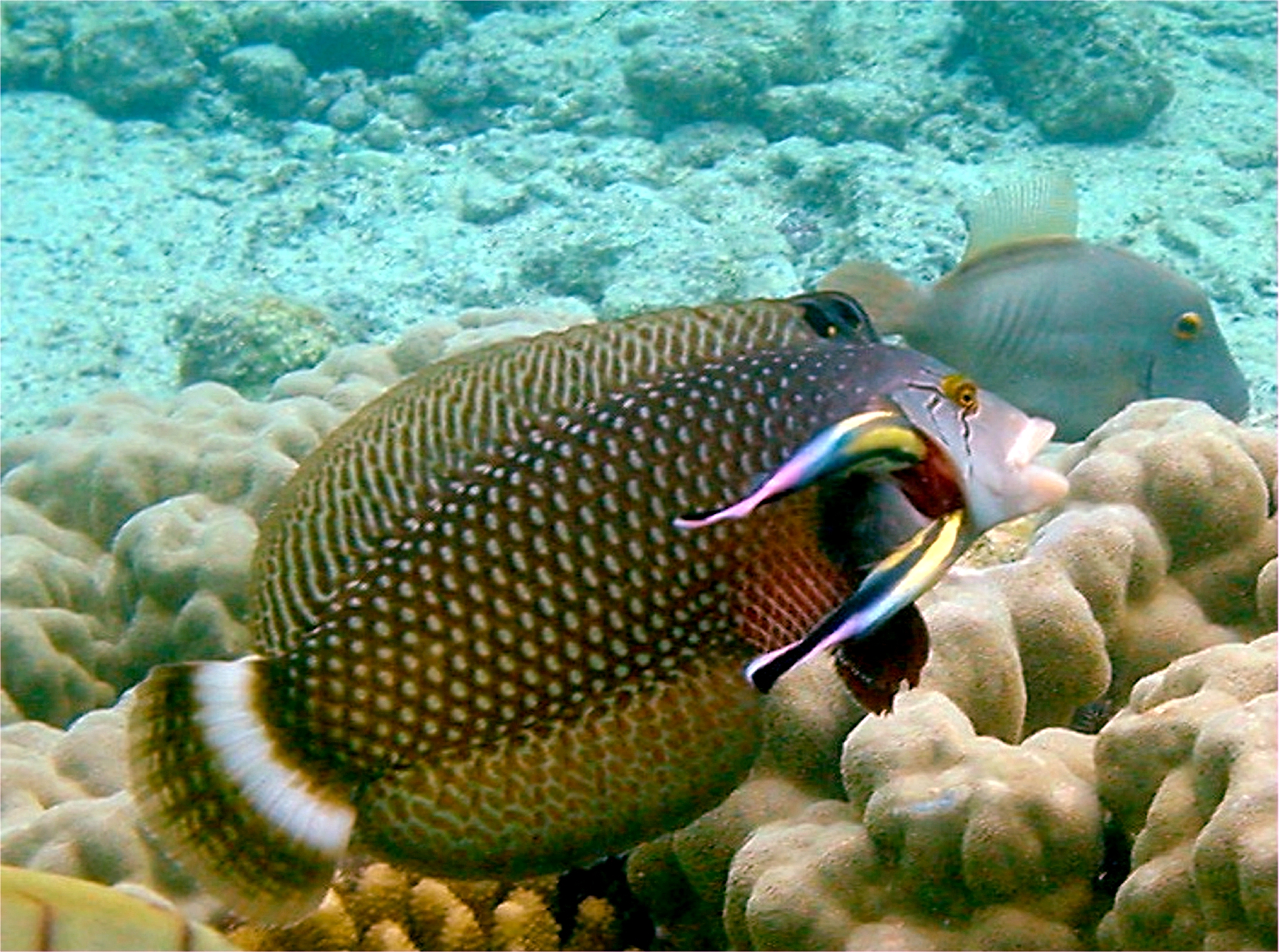
Cleaning a rockmover wrasse

The Hawaiian cleaner wrasse moves with a graceful flitting movement. At night it may rest in a balloon-like cocoon it builds from mucus. The species is monogamous, with a pair bond being formed during the breeding season. It is an obligate feeder on the ectoparasites of other fish to the extent that it will fail to thrive in an aquarium where these feeding needs are not met.

The behaviour of this fish is very similar to that of the closely related bluestreak cleaner wrasse (Labroides dimidiatus), widely found in the rest of Indo-Pacific region. Both species operate cleaning stations where larger fish (clients) visit and cooperate in the removal by the cleaner fish of their ectoparasites, loose flakes of skin and mucus. The arrangement is mutually beneficial, with the client fish having its parasites removed and the wrasse gaining protection and finding an easy meal. The process is not without danger for the cleaner fish as many of the client fish are piscivores, but observations in the wild show an apparent absence of "cheating" by the client fish, which seem to appreciate the tactile stimulation provided by the cleaner fish moving around their skin and fins.

It seems that cleaner fish build up a relationship with their clients and there is some communication between them. When the client arrives at a cleaning station, it observes what the cleaner fish is doing, if it already has a client, of the cleaner's previous client "jolts" (twitches in response to a cleaner "cheating" by taking a bite of the client's scales or mucus), in which case the prospective client may depart. If happy with what it sees, the client adopts a certain species-specific pose which invites the cleaner fish to set to work on it.

== Status ==
This fish has a restricted range in the vicinity of the Hawaiian Islands but is relatively common there. Much of its range is within the Papahānaumokuākea Marine National Monument, a well-managed marine protected area. No specific threats to this fish have been identified although degradation of its coral reef habitat is likely to have some impact on it. The International Union for Conservation of Nature has assessed its conservation status as being of "least concern.

== Aquatic Trade ==
This fish is sometimes taken out of the wild for aquarium trade around the world. It can be found on many aquatic fish websites.
