= Yellow goatfish =

Conservation status
- Least Concern (IUCN 3.1)

Scientific classification
- Kingdom: Animalia
- Phylum: Chordata
- Class: Actinopterygii
- Division: Teleostei
- Order: Syngnathiformes
- Family: Mullidae
- Genus: Mulloidichthys
- Species: M. martinicus

Binomial name
- Mulloidichthys martinicus (G. Cuvier, 1829)

Synonyms
- Upeneus martinicus G. Cuvier, 1829; Mulloides martinicus (G. Cuvier, 1829)

Species of ray-finned fish

The yellow goatfish (Mulloidichthys martinicus), also known as yellowsaddle, is a species of goatfish native to the Atlantic Ocean around the coasts of Africa and the Americas. This species can reach a total length of 39.4 cm (15.5 in), but most reach lengths only around 28 cm (11 in). They are of minor importance to local commercial fisheries, though they have been reported to carry the ciguatera toxin.

== Habits ==
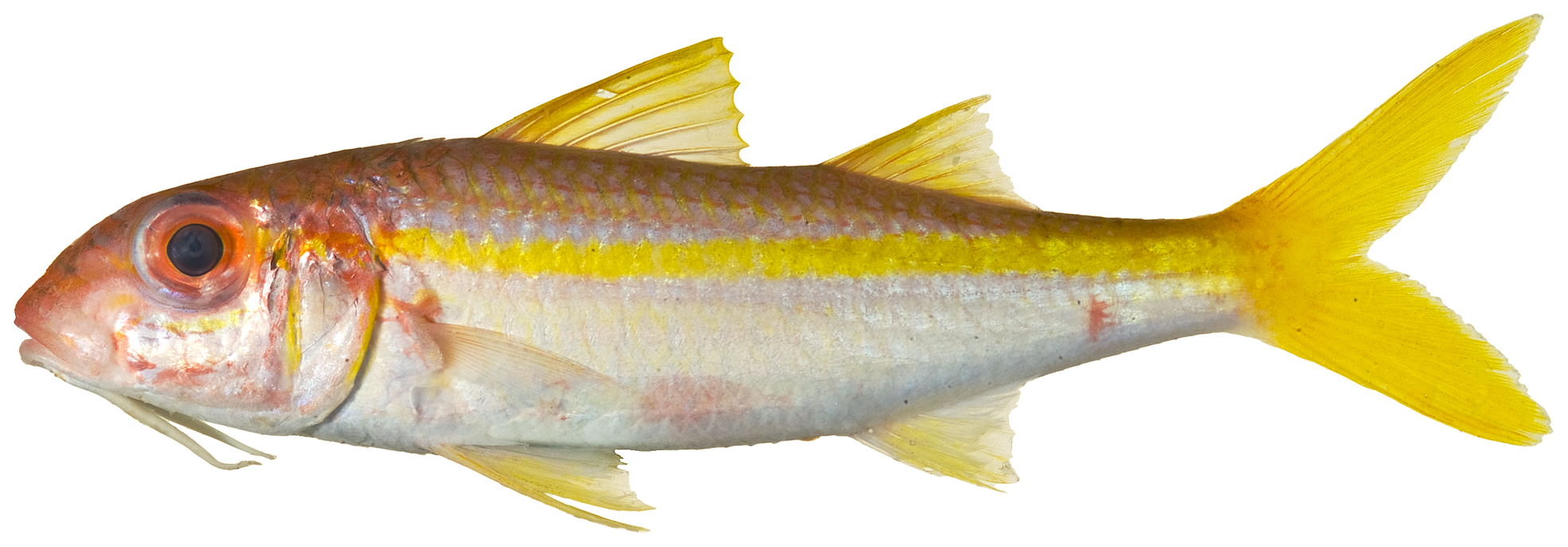
Illustration

Yellow goatfish are benthic feeders, using a pair of long chemosensory barbels ("whiskers") protruding from their chins to rifle through the sediments in search of a meal. They usually feed on smaller fish, hunting in a school during the day, and alone at night. Yellow goatfish can live solitary or in similar-sized groups, sometimes switching between groups. When hunting in groups, each goatfish can be either a chaser, directly attacking prey or as a blocker, surrounding prey hiding in coral.

M. martinicus appears to mimic the appearance of grunts in the genus Haemulon, and is often found schooling with them.

== Distribution ==
The yellow goatfish can be found on reefs in the tropical waters in the Pacific, the Atlantic around the United States, in the Gulf of Mexico, the Caribbean Sea, and around Cape Verde.
