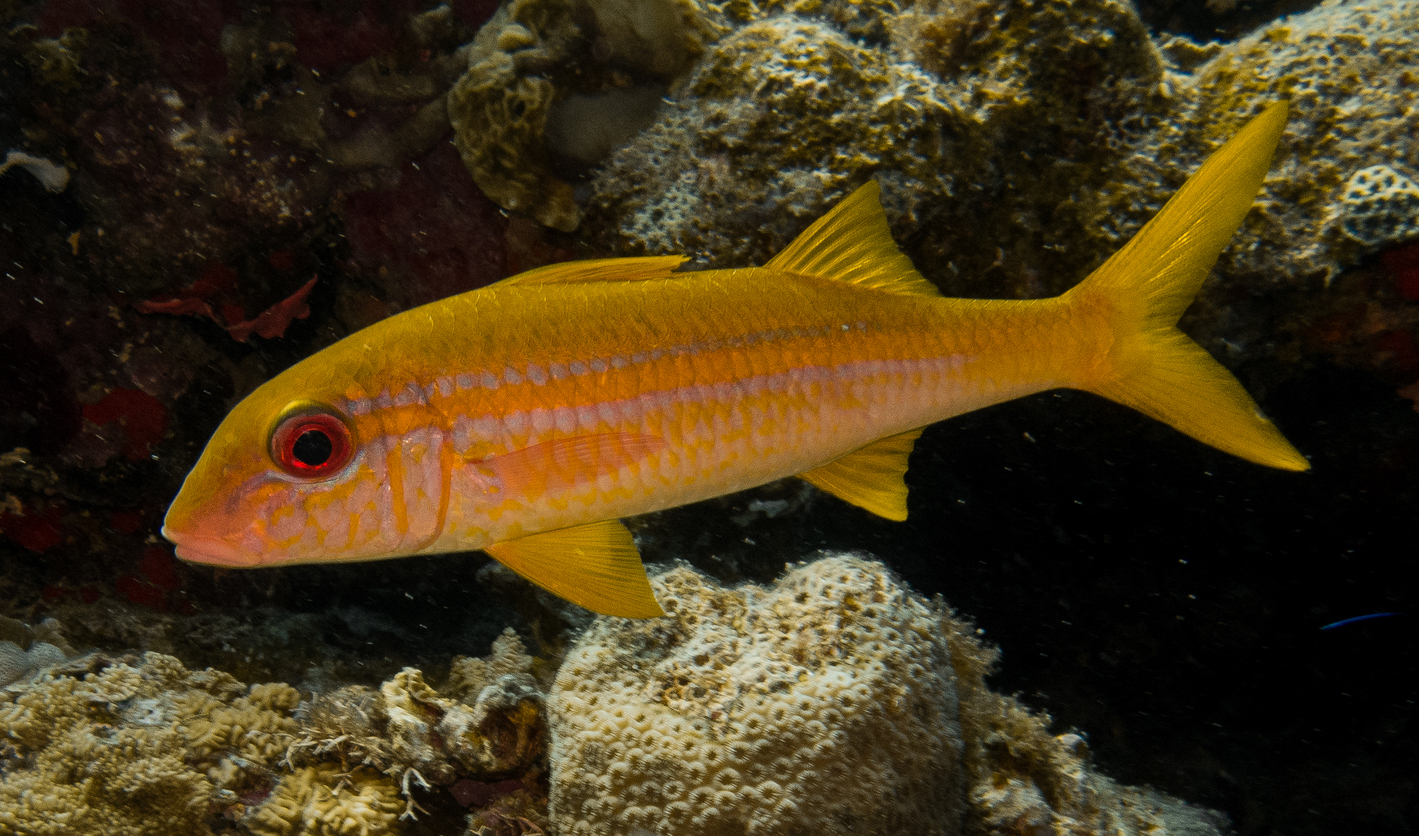
- In Queensland, Australia

Conservation status
- Least Concern (IUCN 3.1)

Scientific classification
- Kingdom: Animalia
- Phylum: Chordata
- Class: Actinopterygii
- Order: Syngnathiformes
- Family: Mullidae
- Genus: Mulloidichthys
- Species: M. vanicolensis

Binomial name
- Mulloidichthys vanicolensis (Valenciennes, 1831)

Synonyms
- Upeneus vanicolensis Valenciennes, 1831; Mulloides vanicolensis (Valenciennes, 1831); Pseudopeneus vanicolensis (Valenciennes, 1831); Pseudupeneus vanicolensis (Valenciennes, 1831); Mulloides erythrinus Klunzinger, 1884

= Yellowfin goatfish =

Species of fish

The yellowfin goatfish (Mulloidichthys vanicolensis) is a species of goatfish native to the Indian Ocean and the Pacific Ocean.

== Description ==
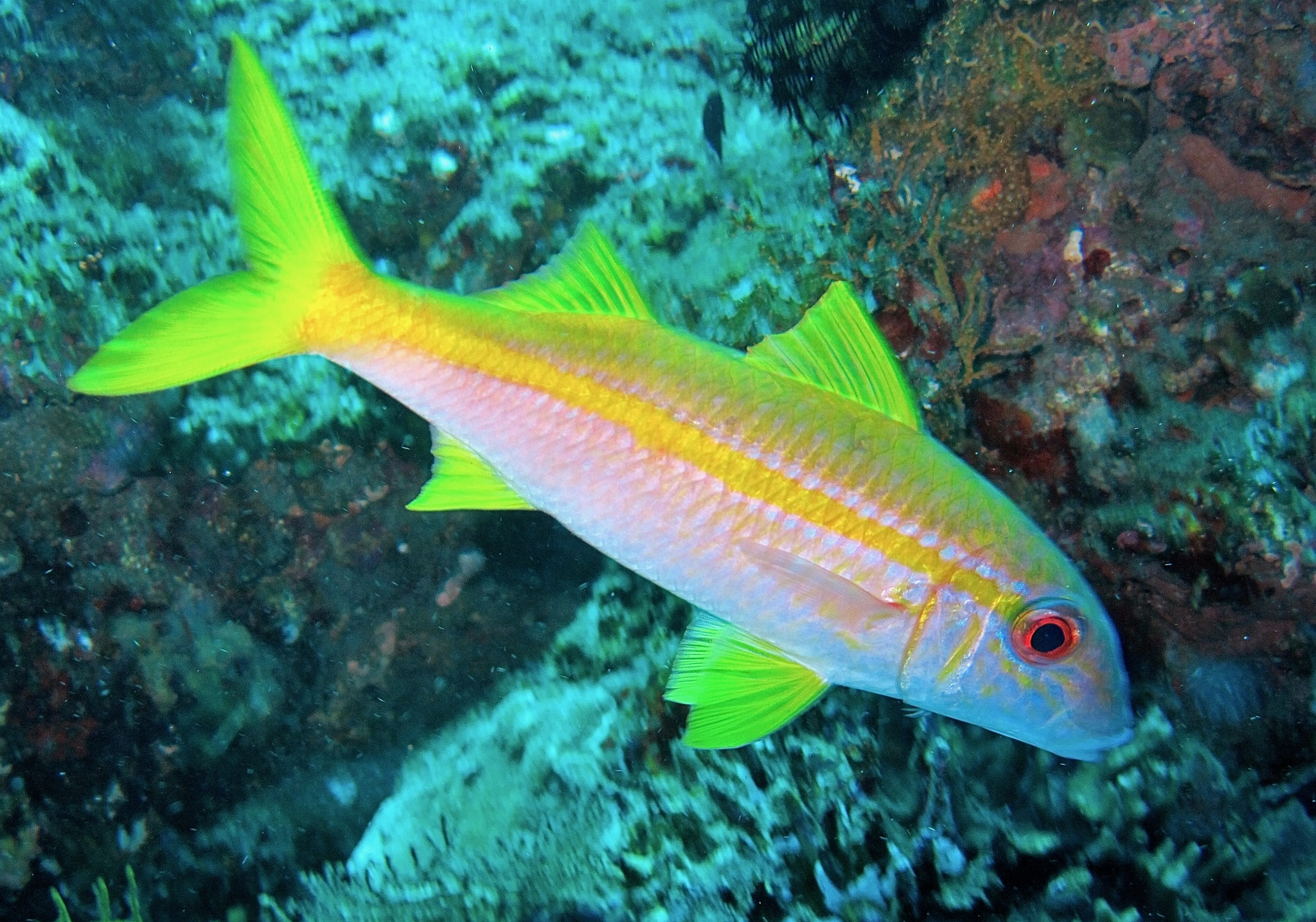
In Indonesia

M. vanicolensis can reach a maximum length of 38 cm (15 in).

The back is red-orange, while the flanks and the belly are whitish and the fins are yellow. The sides show a yellow longitudinal band. This species feeds on crustaceans or worms at night. By day, it forms large aggregations.

== Distribution and habitat ==
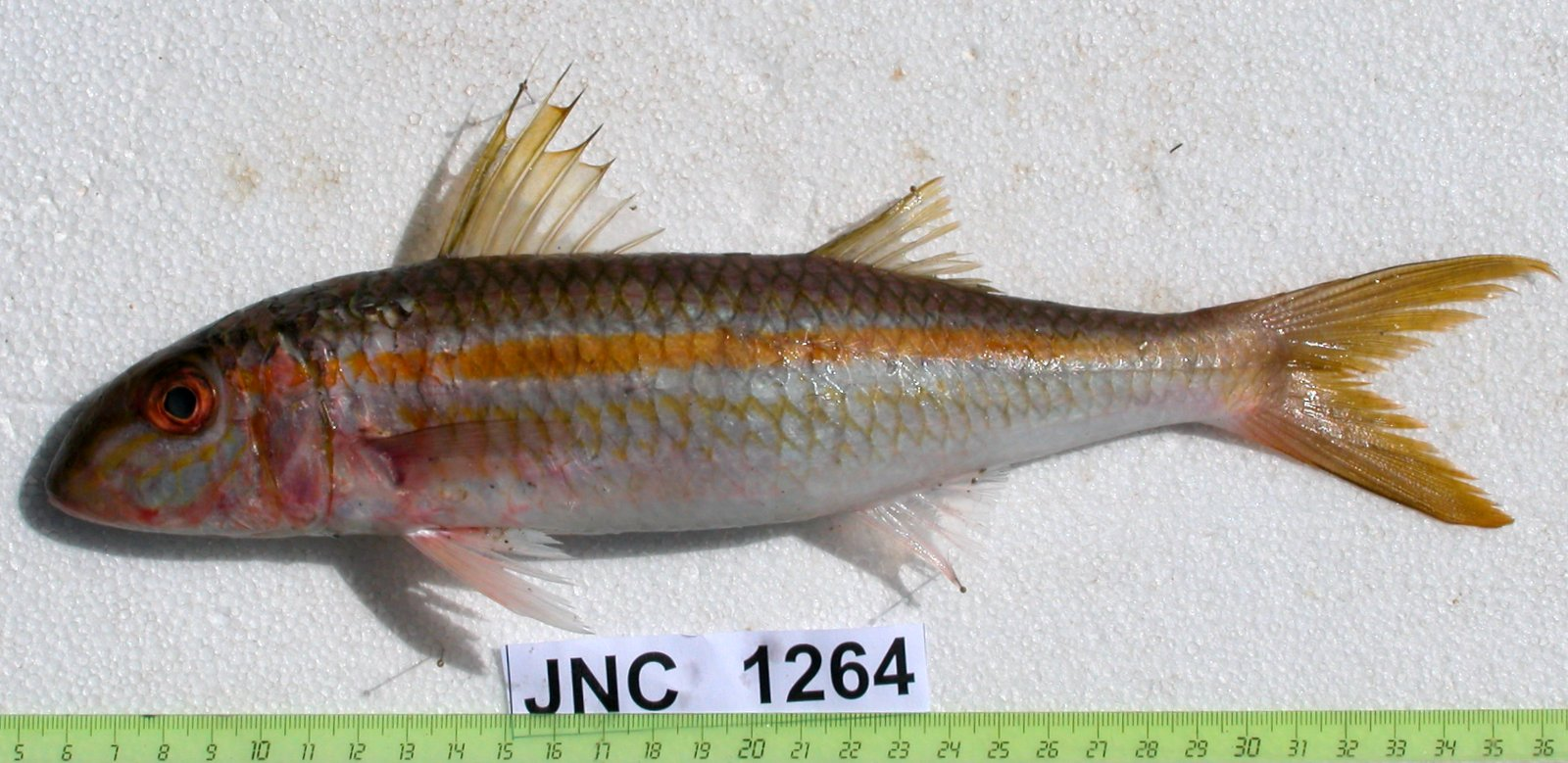
Sold at a fish market, New Caledonia

These fish are widespread in the Indo-Pacific, from the Red Sea to Hawaii and the Tuamotus, north to Japan and to Lord Howe Island to the south.

The yellowfin goatfish is a reef-associated species. It usually can be found in lagoons and seaward reefs at depths of 1–113 m (3.3–370.7 ft).

== Parasites ==
Two genera of monogenean gill parasites, namely Volsellituba and Pennulituba, with a total of five different species, including V. orchidea, V. nabla, V. elephantina, P. piratifalx, and P. cymansis, have been reported from the yellowfin goatfish off New Caledonia, and were apparently found only on this species of fish. The apocreadiid digenean Homalometron moraveci is found in the intestine.
