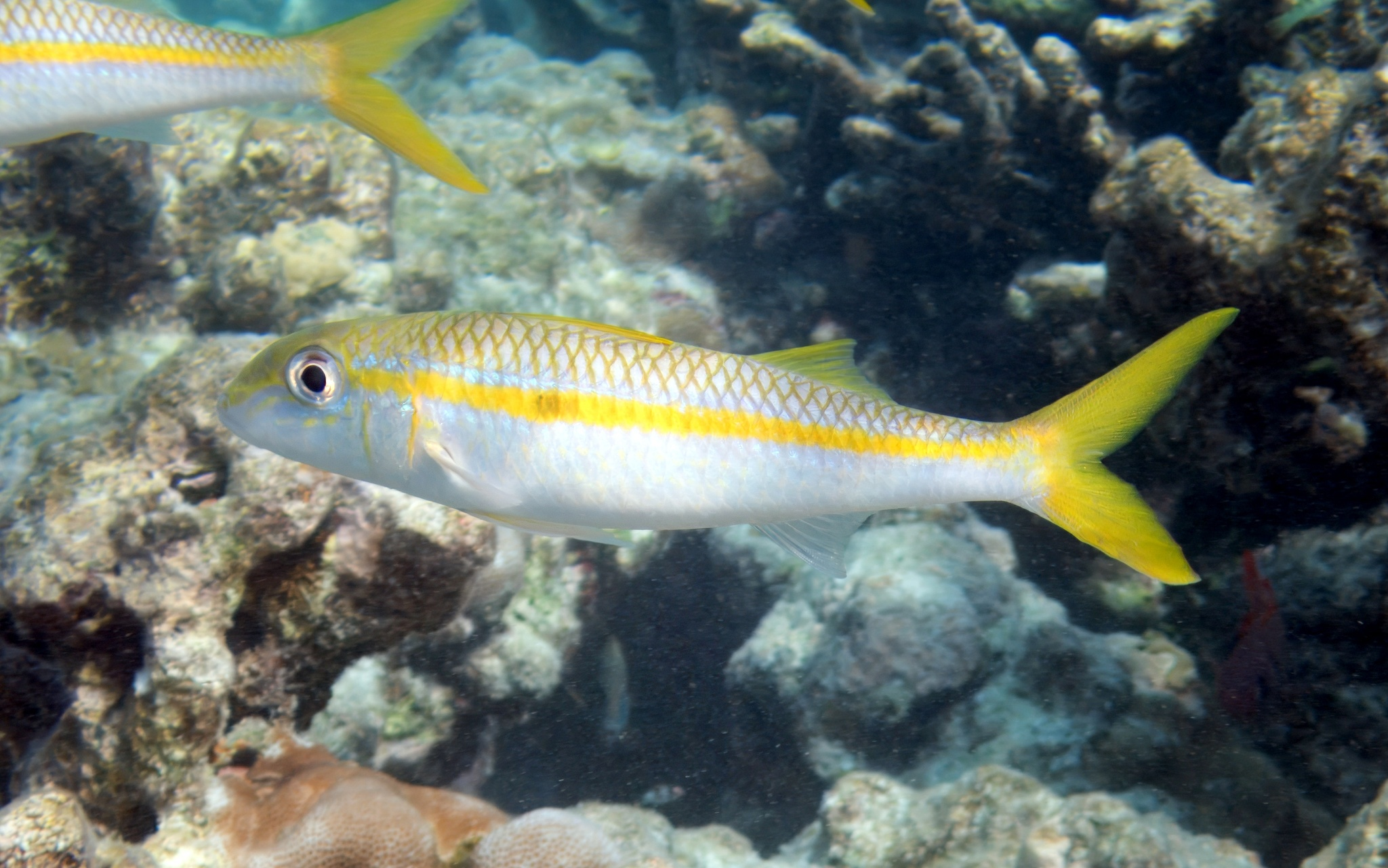
- Mulloidichthys flavolineatus

Scientific classification
- Kingdom: Animalia
- Phylum: Chordata
- Class: Actinopterygii
- Order: Syngnathiformes
- Family: Mullidae
- Genus: Mulloidichthys; Whitley, 1929

Type species
- Mullus flavolineatus Lacépède, 1801

Synonyms
- Mulloides Bleeker, 1849; Pseudomulloides Miranda-Ribeiro, 1915

= Mulloidichthys =

Genus of ray-finned fishes

Mulloidichthys is a genus of ray-finned fish in the family Mullidae native to coral and rocky reefs of the tropical Atlantic, Indian and Pacific Ocean.

== Mimicry ==
Several species of Mulloidichthys mimic the appearance of other fish species. M. mimicus mimics and schools with the snapper Lutjanus kasmira, while M. martinicus mimics and schools with grunts in the genus Haemulon.

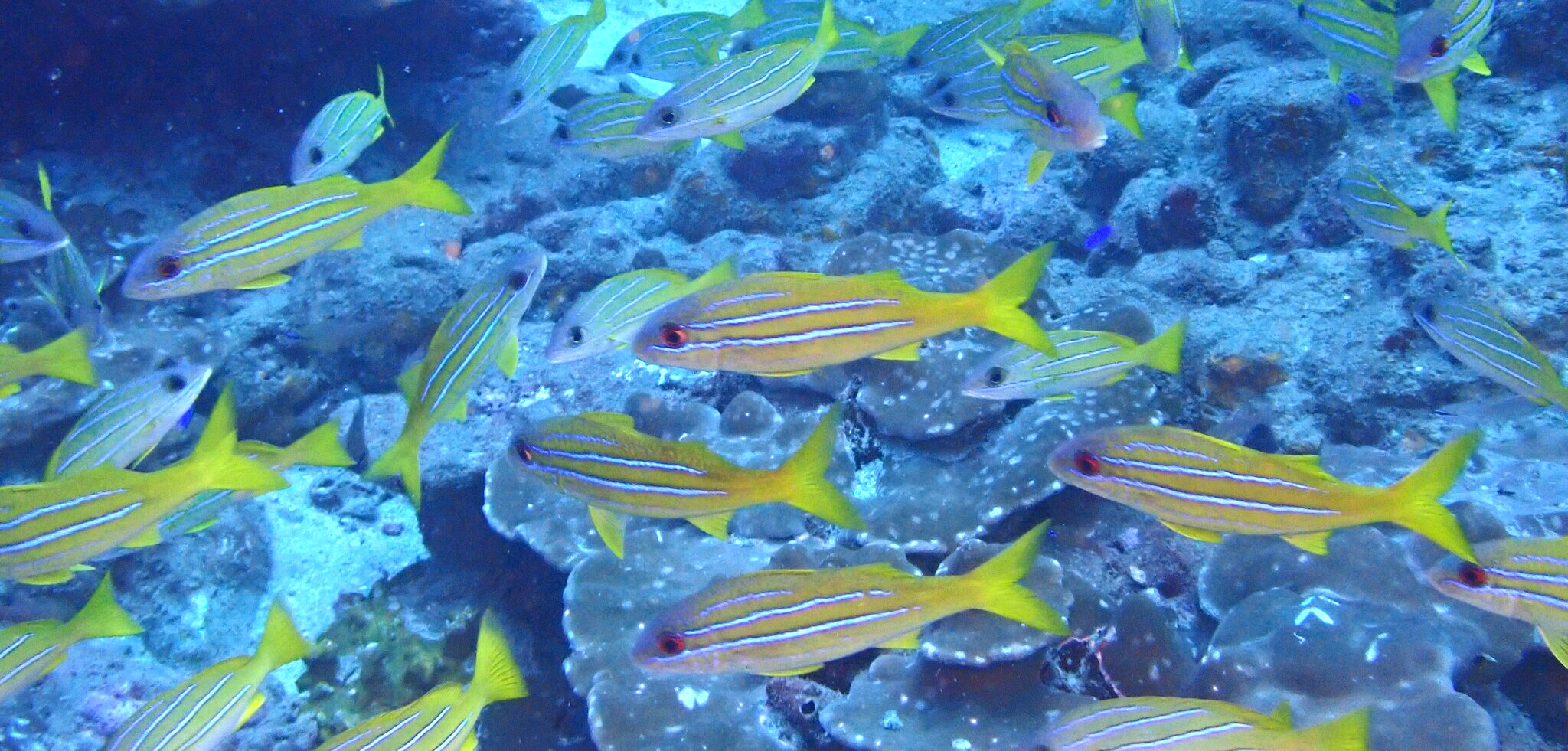
M. mimicus with Lutjanus kasmira

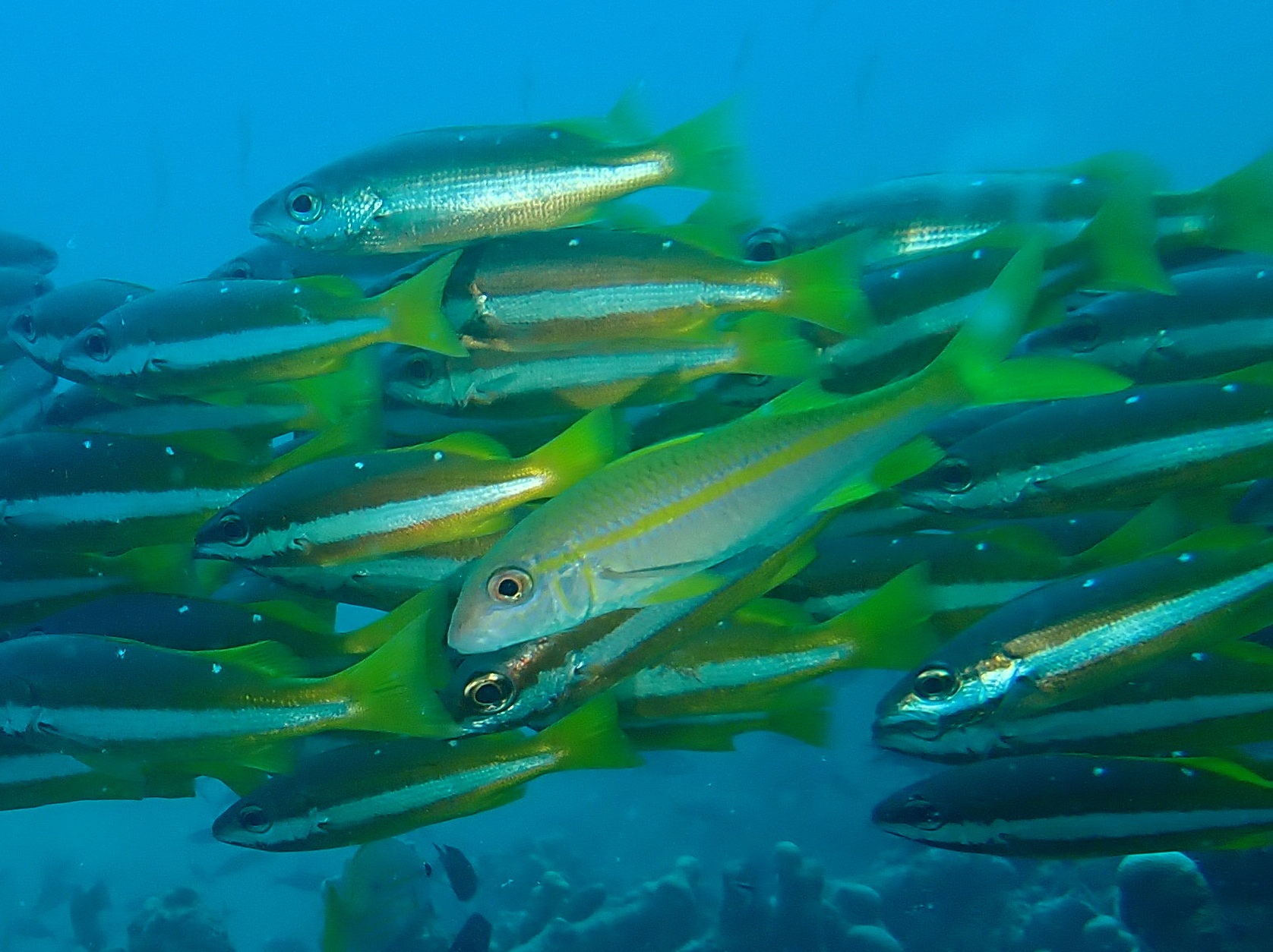
M. vanicolensis with Lutjanus biguttatus

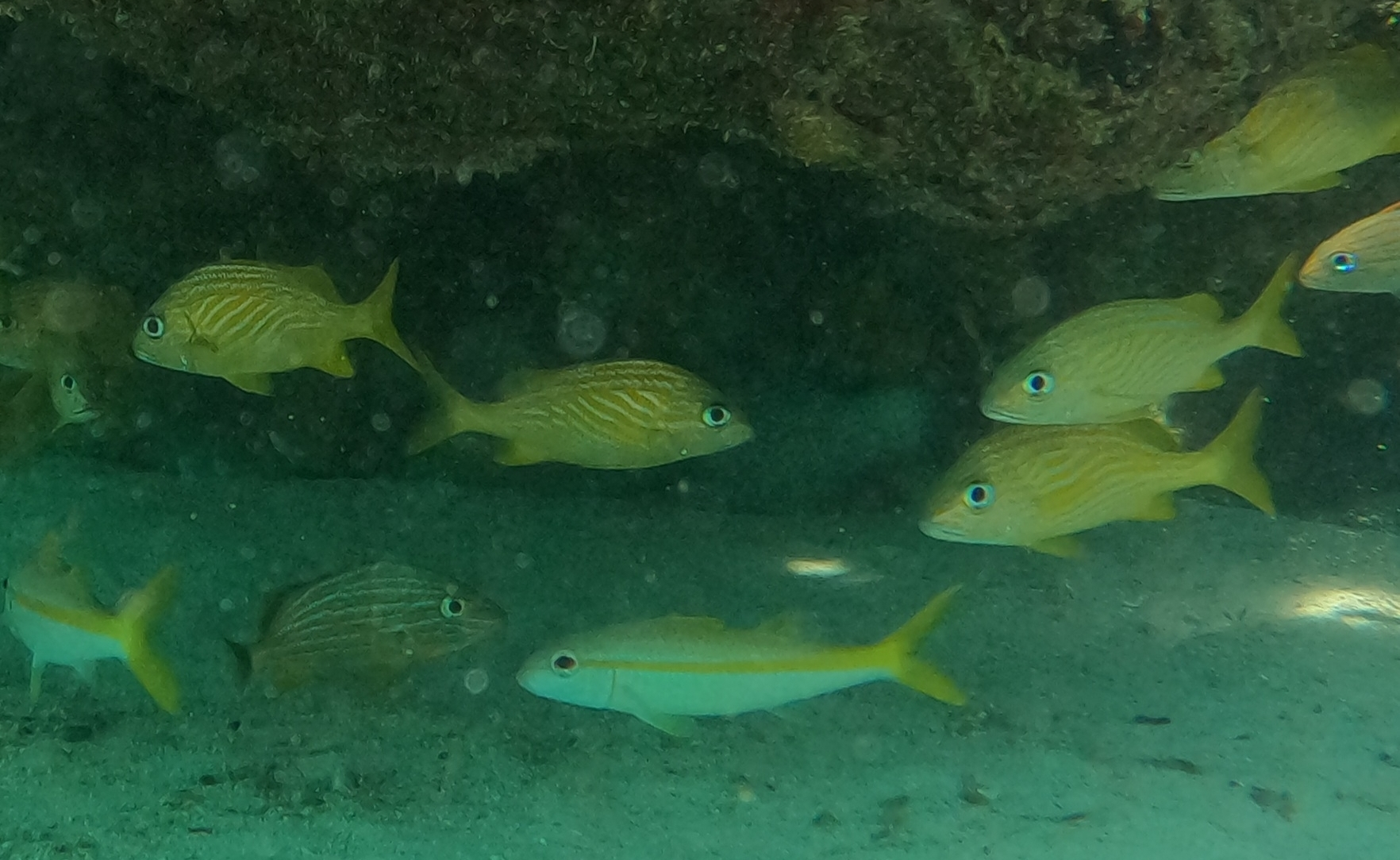
M. martinicus with Haemulon flavolineatum.

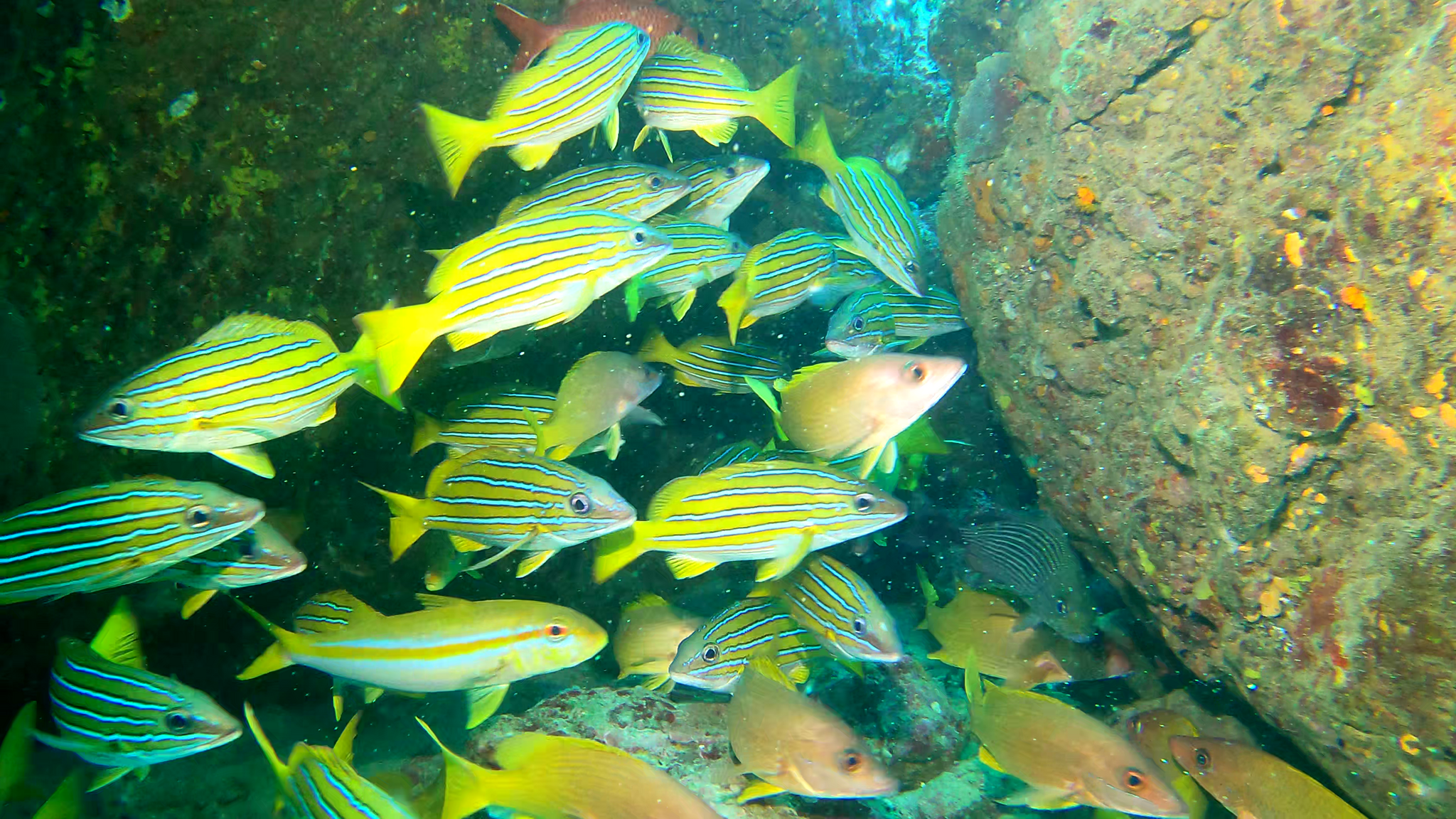
M. dentatus with Lutjanus viridis and Lutjanus argentiventris

== Species ==
There are currently 7 recognized species in this genus:

Species		Common name	Image
Mulloidichthys ayliffe Uiblein, 2011		Indian mimic goatfish	
Mulloidichthys dentatus (T. N. Gill, 1862)		Mexican goatfish	
Mulloidichthys flavolineatus (Lacépède, 1801)	M. f. flavicaudus Fernández-Silva & J. E. Randall, 2016	Yellow-tail goatfish	
Mulloidichthys flavolineatus (Lacépède, 1801)	M. f. flavolineatus (Lacépède, 1801)	Yellow-stripe goatfish	
Mulloidichthys martinicus (G. Cuvier, 1829)		Yellow goatfish	
Mulloidichthys mimicus J. E. Randall & Guézé, 1980		Mimic goatfish	
Mulloidichthys pfluegeri (Steindachner, 1900)		Orange goatfish	
Mulloidichthys vanicolensis (Valenciennes, 1831)		Yellow-fin goatfish	
