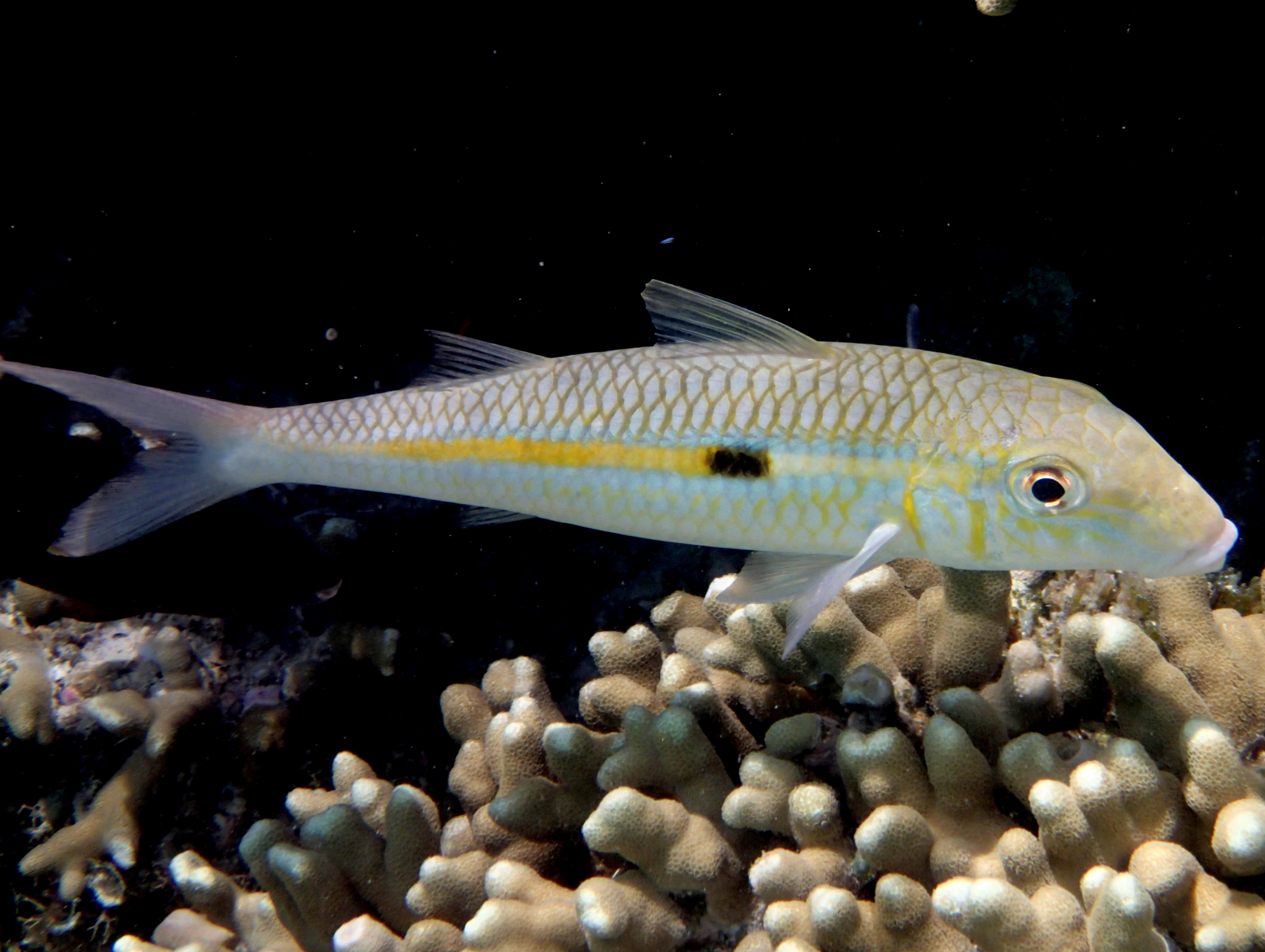

Conservation status
- Least Concern (IUCN 3.1)

Scientific classification
- Kingdom: Animalia
- Phylum: Chordata
- Class: Actinopterygii
- Division: Teleostei
- Order: Syngnathiformes
- Family: Mullidae
- Genus: Mulloidichthys
- Species: M. flavolineatus

Binomial name
- Mulloidichthys flavolineatus (Lacépède, 1801)

Synonyms
- Mullus flavolineatus Lacepède, 1801

= Yellowstripe goatfish =

Indo-Pacific species of goatfish

The yellowstripe goatfish (Mulloidichthys flavolineatus) is a species of goatfish native to the Pacific Ocean and the Indian Ocean. The fish is known as Weke ʻaʻā in Hawaiian.

== Description ==
The species' color ranges from grey to white on its sides with red-orange to pure yellow fins. In order to keep itself safe at night it is able to camouflage and blend in to the color of its surroundings. This prevents the fish from being spotted by predators. It is a schooling species, generally found feeding in large groups.

== Distribution and habitat ==
The yellowstripe goatfish occurs in the Indian Ocean and Pacific Ocean in nearshore sandy bottoms and shore reefs at depths of less than 100 meters. It spawns in Hawaii throughout the year with increased activity from February through June.

== Human use ==
This species is used as a food item in Hawaii. It tastes like shrimp, its primary source of food. Also known in Hawaii as the “nightmare weke”, it has been considered to cause nightmares or other hallucinations when consuming the flesh (particularly the head). It is best to be kept cool after harvesting and preserved for longer periods of time in the freezer. Before preparing the fish, it has to be cleaned thoroughly by removing the intestinal tract. People enjoy fishing for goatfish and it is a species that can easily be found by snorkelers throughout the Indo-Pacific.

== Cultural significance ==
The Weke 'a'a lives for fewer than 5 years. Adults fish for them in Hawaii and Guam.
