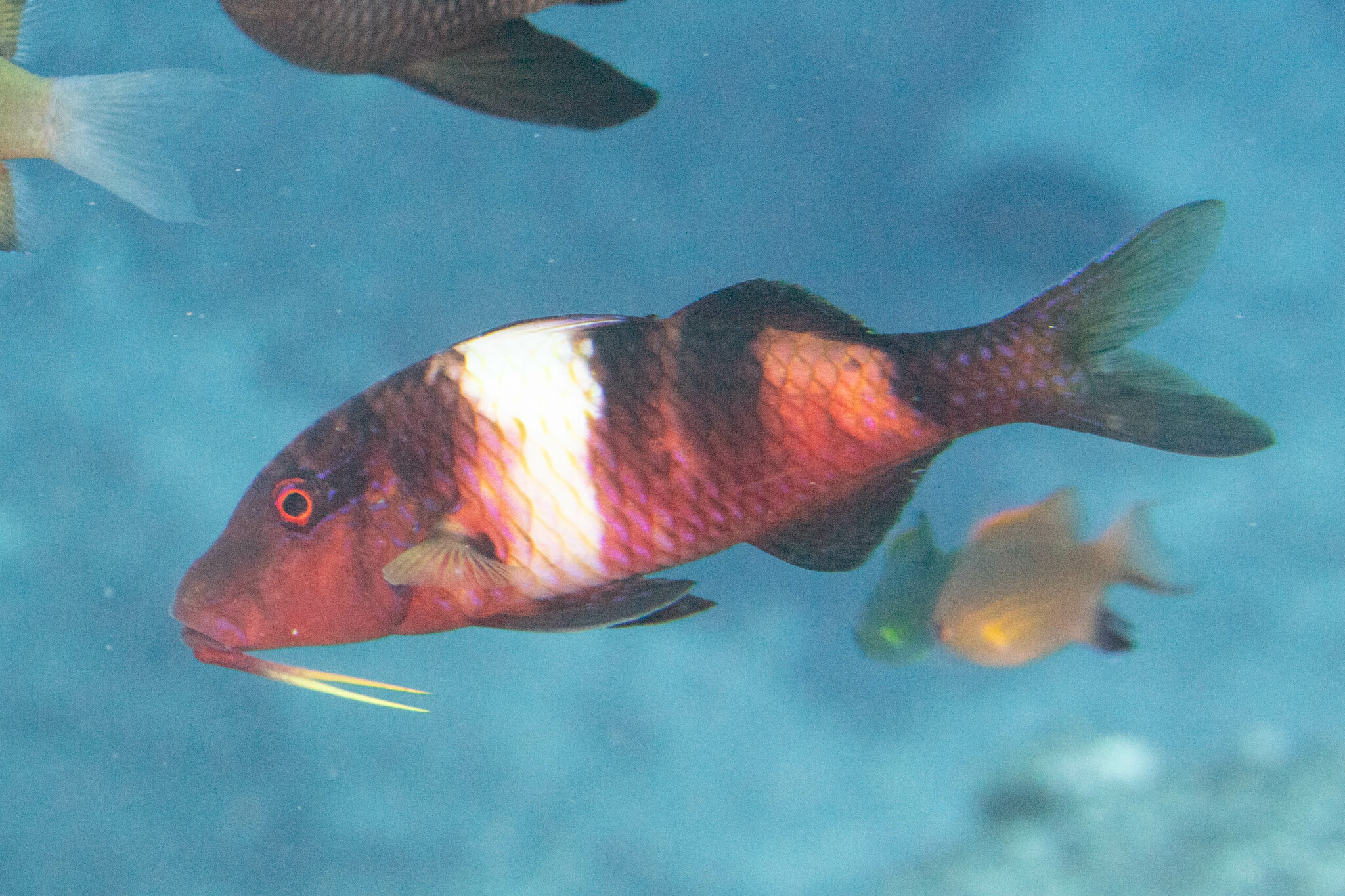

Conservation status
- Least Concern (IUCN 3.1)

Scientific classification
- Kingdom: Animalia
- Phylum: Chordata
- Class: Actinopterygii
- Order: Syngnathiformes
- Family: Mullidae
- Genus: Parupeneus
- Species: P. multifasciatus

Binomial name
- Parupeneus multifasciatus (Quoy & Gaimard, 1825)

Synonyms
- Mullus multifasciatus Quoy & Gaimard, 1825; Upeneus atrocingulatus Kner, 1870; Upeneus velifer R. Smith & Swain, 1882; Pseudupeneus moana D. S. Jordan & Seale, 1906

= Parupeneus multifasciatus =

Species of ray-finned fish

Parupeneus multifasciatus, the manybar goatfish, is a species of goatfish native to the eastern Indian Ocean Pacific Ocean where it is found from Christmas Island to the Hawaiian Islands and from southern Japan to Lord Howe Island.

Its Hawaiian name is moano-nui-ka-lehua (meaning "great moano of the lehua"), and the juveniles are called 'ahua or 'ohua (meaning "seedling"). Moano in Hawaiian means pale-red color.

== Description ==
A recognizable feature of the goatfish is their chin whiskers. Some common features are yellow or blue accents on the edges of scales, dark spots around the eyes, dark spots around the base of the pectoral fin, and white and dark bars. Some common color variations include: red with black spots; light red with no spots; black with yellow spot near the tail; and purple-red with yellow and black spots. Males of this species can reach a length of 35 centimetres (14 in) TL while females only reach 17.9 centimetres (7.0 in) SL. Their reproductive size is 7 inch (17.8 cm). The heaviest recorded moano was 453 g (0.9987 lb). The life history of the moano has a pelagic larval duration of 24 – 28 days in captivity.

== Ecology ==
Moano are common reef fish found in shallow water environments, reef flats, and outside reefs. They spend a lot of their time in the benthic zone. They can be found at depths 0 – 161 m deep (0 – 528 ft).

They are endemic in three regions: Hawaiʻi, Marquesas, and the Indo-Polynesian Province.

== Diet ==
They are diurnal consumers that prey on crustaceans and small fishes. They can be omnivores.

== Fishing regulations ==
In Hawaiʻi, it is common to catch moano using nets / traps, spears, and pole/line. In Hawaiʻi, the minimum size requirement is seven inches, and eight inches on the island of Maui.

== Human uses ==
Moano are game fish that can be eaten raw, broiled, or baked. This is a commercially important species, and can be found in the aquarium trade.

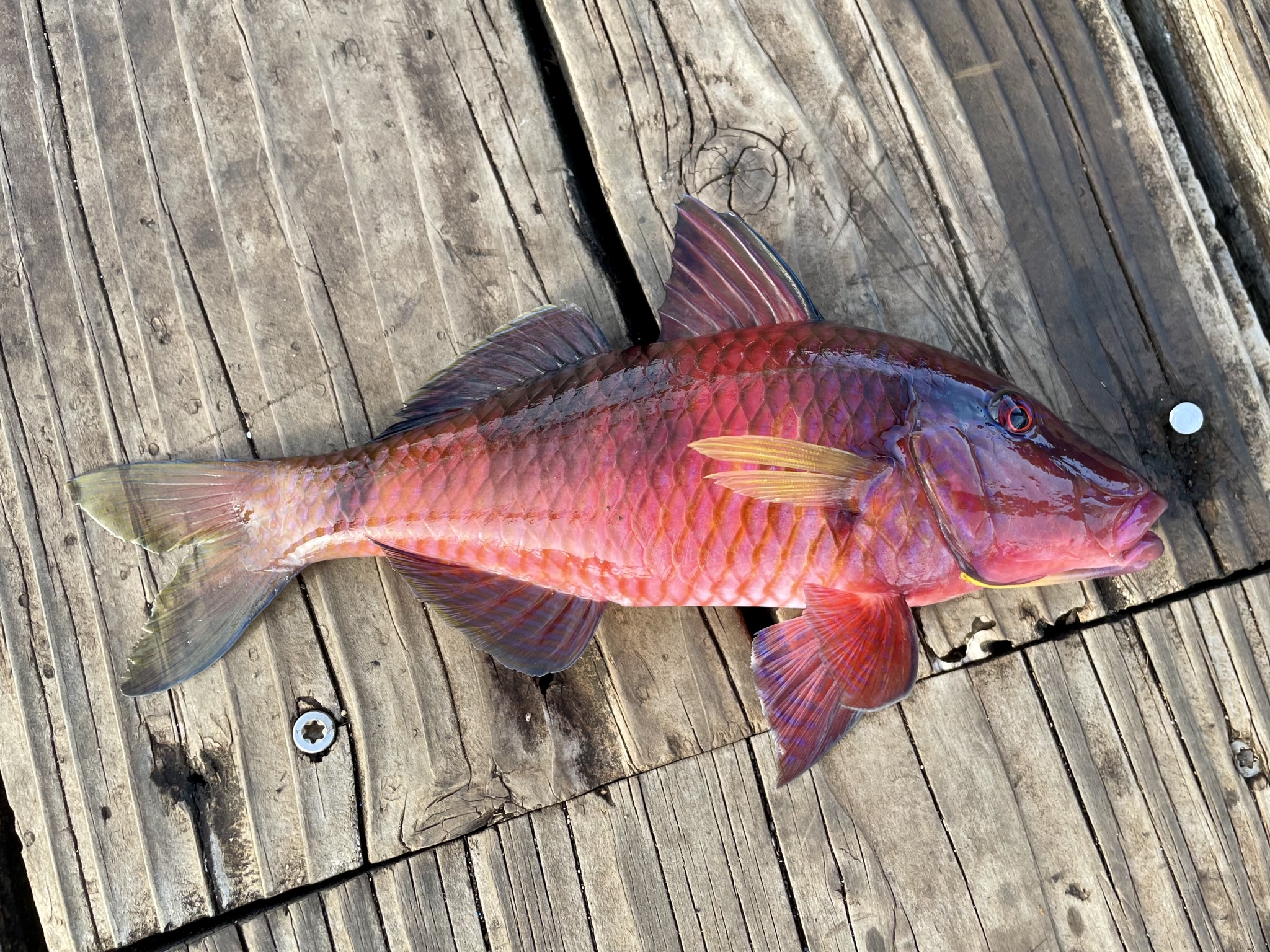

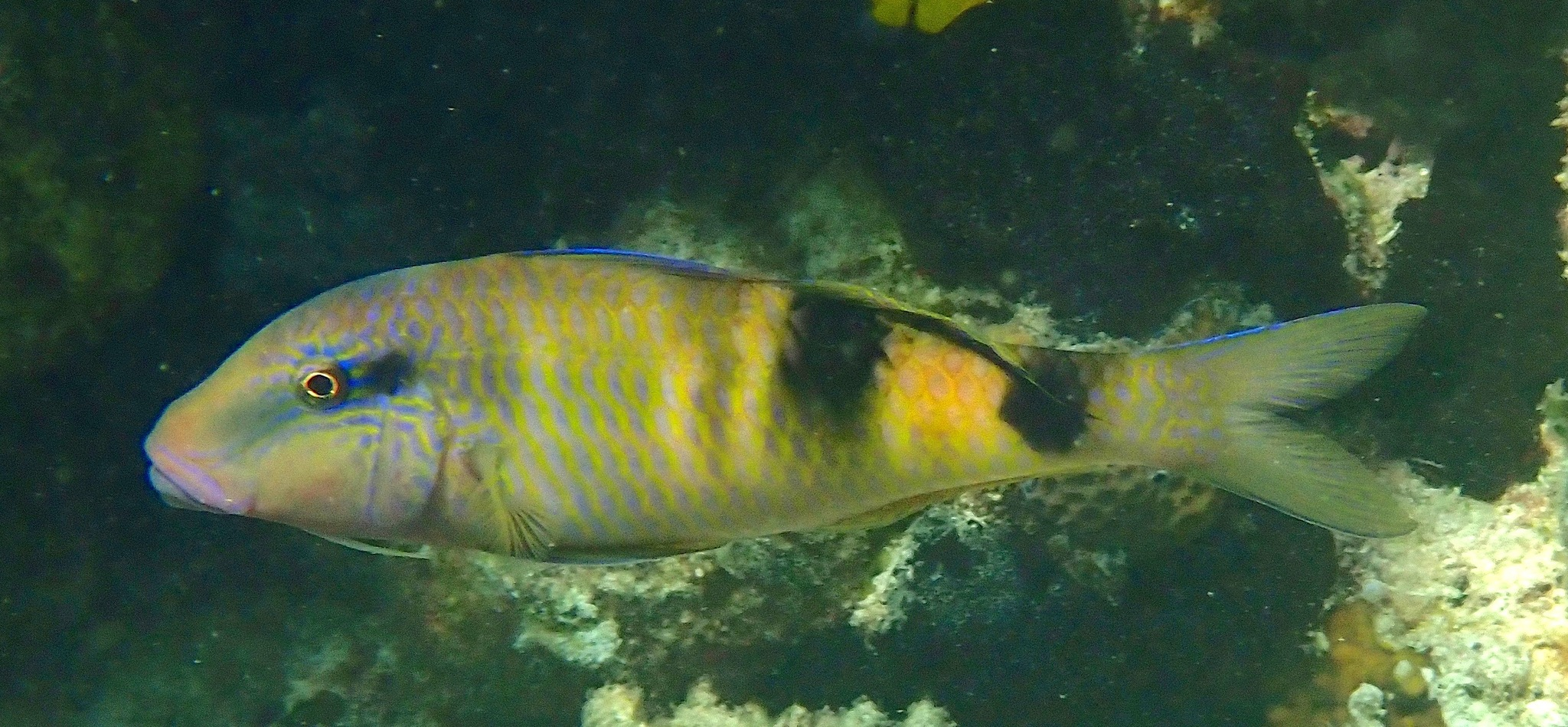

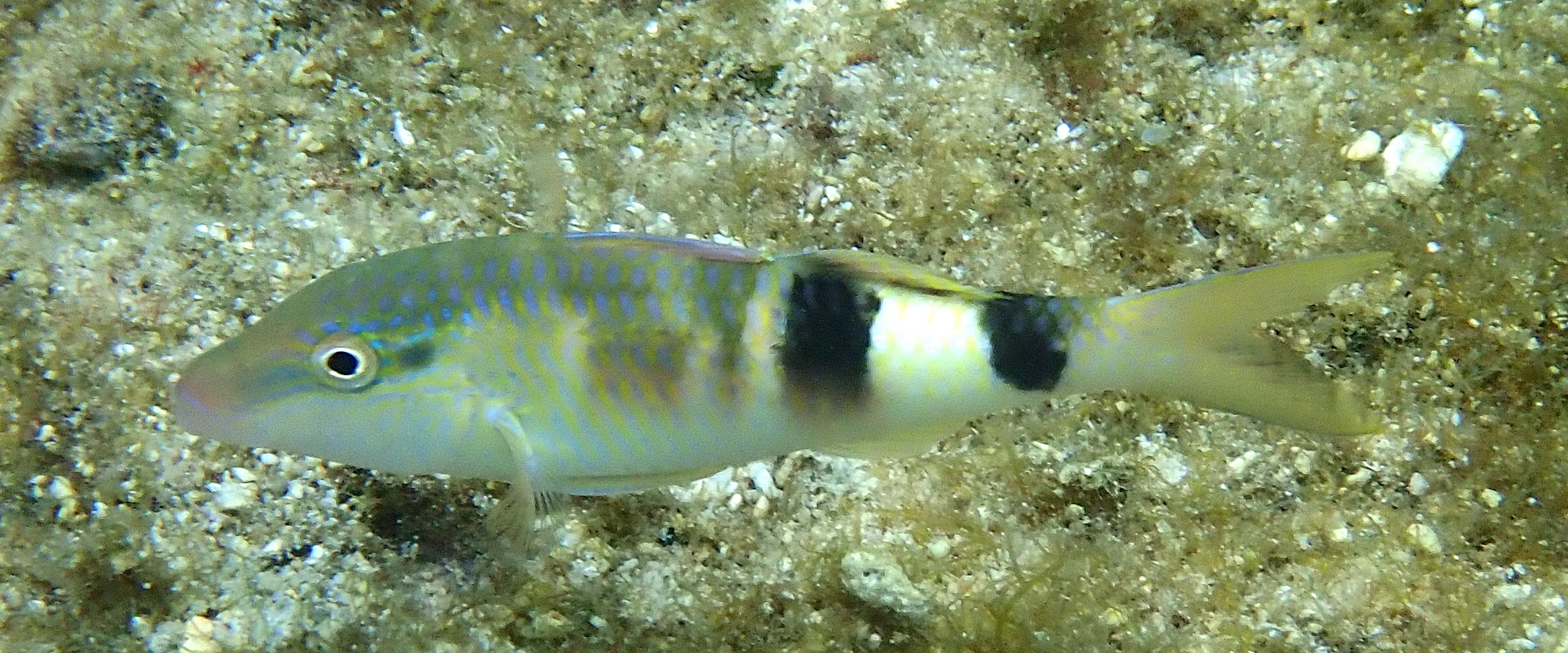
