= Parupeneus chrysonemus =

Scientific classification
- Kingdom: Animalia
- Phylum: Chordata
- Class: Actinopterygii
- Division: Teleostei
- Order: Syngnathiformes
- Family: Mullidae
- Genus: Parupeneus
- Species: P. chrysonemus

Binomial name
- Parupeneus chrysonemus (Jordan & Evermann, 1903)

Synonyms
- Pseudupeneus chrysonemus

Species of fish

Parupeneus chrysonemus is a species of ray-finned fish in the family Mullidae, the goatfishes.
