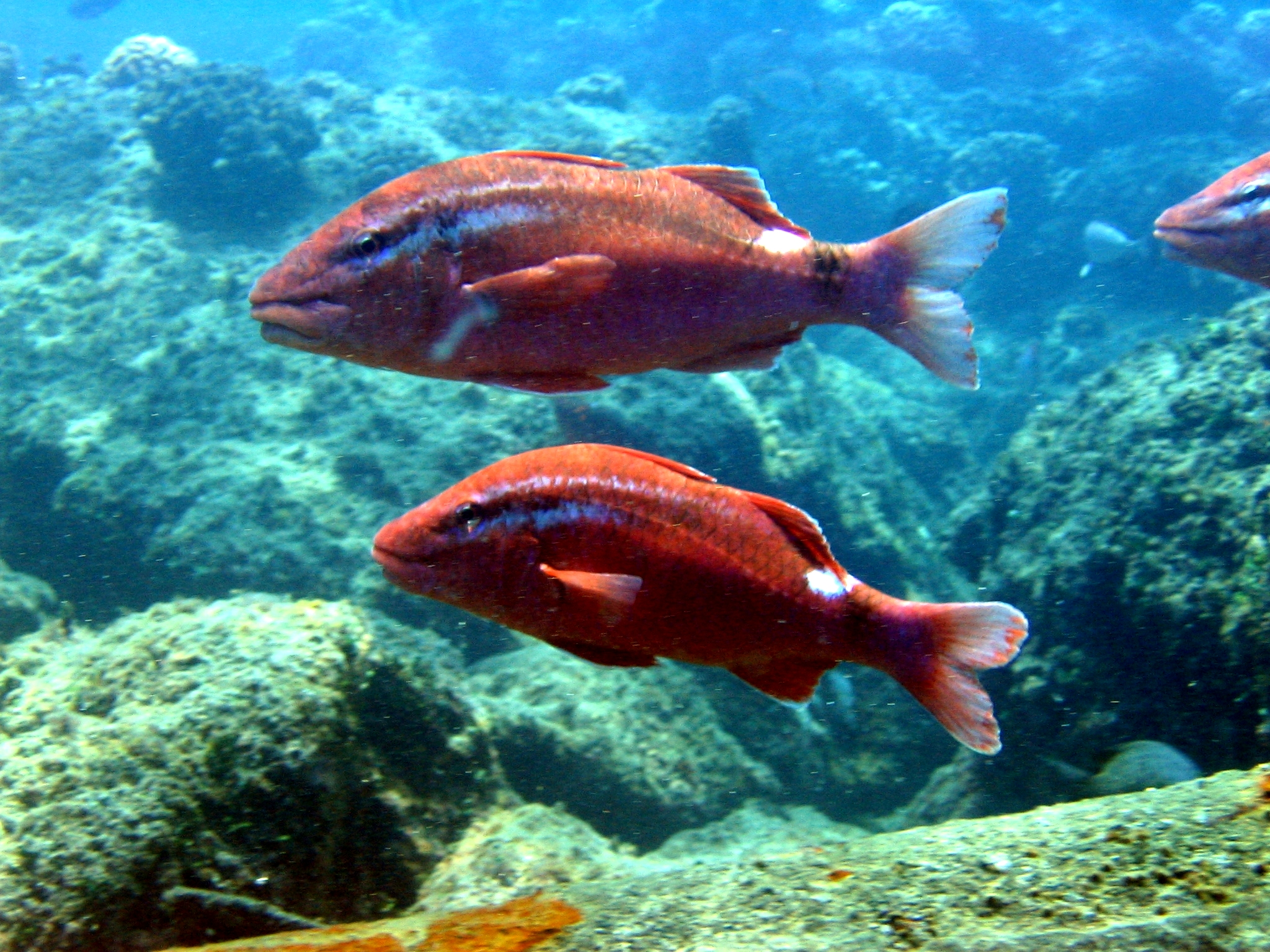

Scientific classification
- Kingdom: Animalia
- Phylum: Chordata
- Class: Actinopterygii
- Order: Syngnathiformes
- Family: Mullidae
- Genus: Parupeneus
- Species: P. porphyreus

Binomial name
- Parupeneus porphyreus (Jenkins, 1903)

= Parupeneus porphyreus =

Species of fish

Parupeneus porphyreus, also called whitesaddle goatfish or kūmū in Hawaiian, is endemic to Hawaii. This species of goatfish used to be the most common goatfish in Hawaiʻi around 1960, but has declined in numbers since.

== Description and biology ==
Parupeneus porphyreus has pale streaks along the body. They can be grayish purple, greenish, or reddish in color and have a remarkable ability to change color in seconds. They have a small white spot, or saddle above the base of the tail and beard-like extrusions called barbels on the lower part of its head, resembling a goats beard.

Kolokolopā or mākolokolopā is the tiny stage of the kūmū. ʻAhuluhulu is the name of a juvenile kūmū. Kūmū aʻe is the stage when young kūmū are in the process of transforming into an adult kūmū. Kūmū is the term for adults.

As adults are crepuscular or nocturnal, but young feed during the day, so adults seek. They shelter in the holes of the reef during the day and forage over sand during the night to find food. In contrast, juveniles feed during the day.

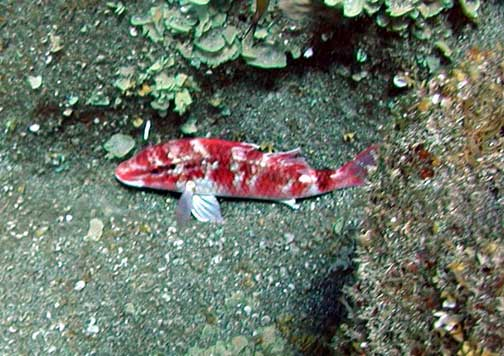
Parupeneus porphyreus

== Distribution and habitat ==
Parupeneus porphyreus are typically found in shallow waters. They are located around coral reef fishes in the main and Northwestern Hawaiian Islands. They live in lagoons and seaward reefs, usually in small groups under ledges or near corals during the day.

== Cultural significance ==
The kūmū was used as an offering to the gods when priests demanded red fish. It was an offering when a canoe was launched, used for hula ceremonies and other events when needed. In Hawaiian culture, kūmū means foundation, a source, purpose, tree, and teacher which is similar to the fish's name: kūmū. When someone wanted to learn from a kumu they would provide a kūmū fish with their request, if the student's learning was complete the teacher would return the kūmū fish.
