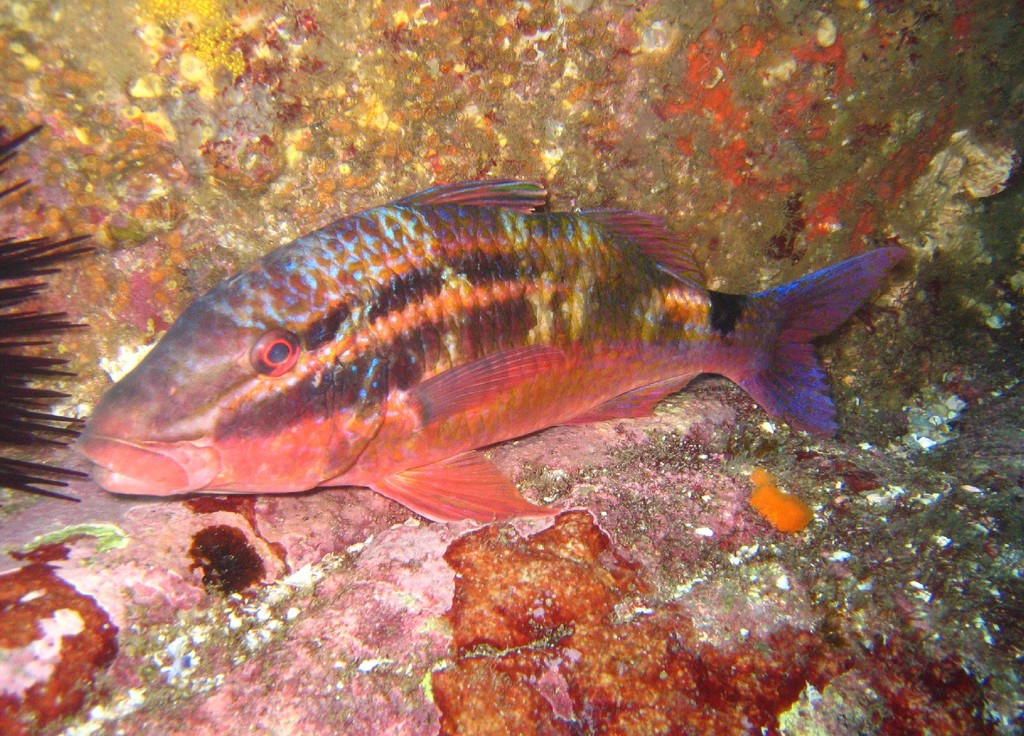
- Aquarium, South West Rocks, NSW

Conservation status
- Least Concern (IUCN 3.1)

Scientific classification
- Kingdom: Animalia
- Phylum: Chordata
- Class: Actinopterygii
- Order: Syngnathiformes
- Family: Mullidae
- Genus: Parupeneus
- Species: P. spilurus

Binomial name
- Parupeneus spilurus (Bleeker, 1854)

Synonyms
- Upeneus spilurus Bleeker, 1854; Upeneus signatus Günther, 1867; Parupeneus signatus (Günther, 1867); Pseudupeneus jeffi Ogilby, 1908

= Black-spot goatfish =

Species of ray-finned fish

Parupeneus spilurus, the blackspot goatfish, is a species of goatfish native to the western Pacific ocean, from Japan to Australia and New Zealand. An inhabitant of coral reefs, it can be found at depths of from 10 to 80 metres (33 to 262 ft). This species can reach a length of 50 centimetres (20 in) TL. It is a commercially important species.
