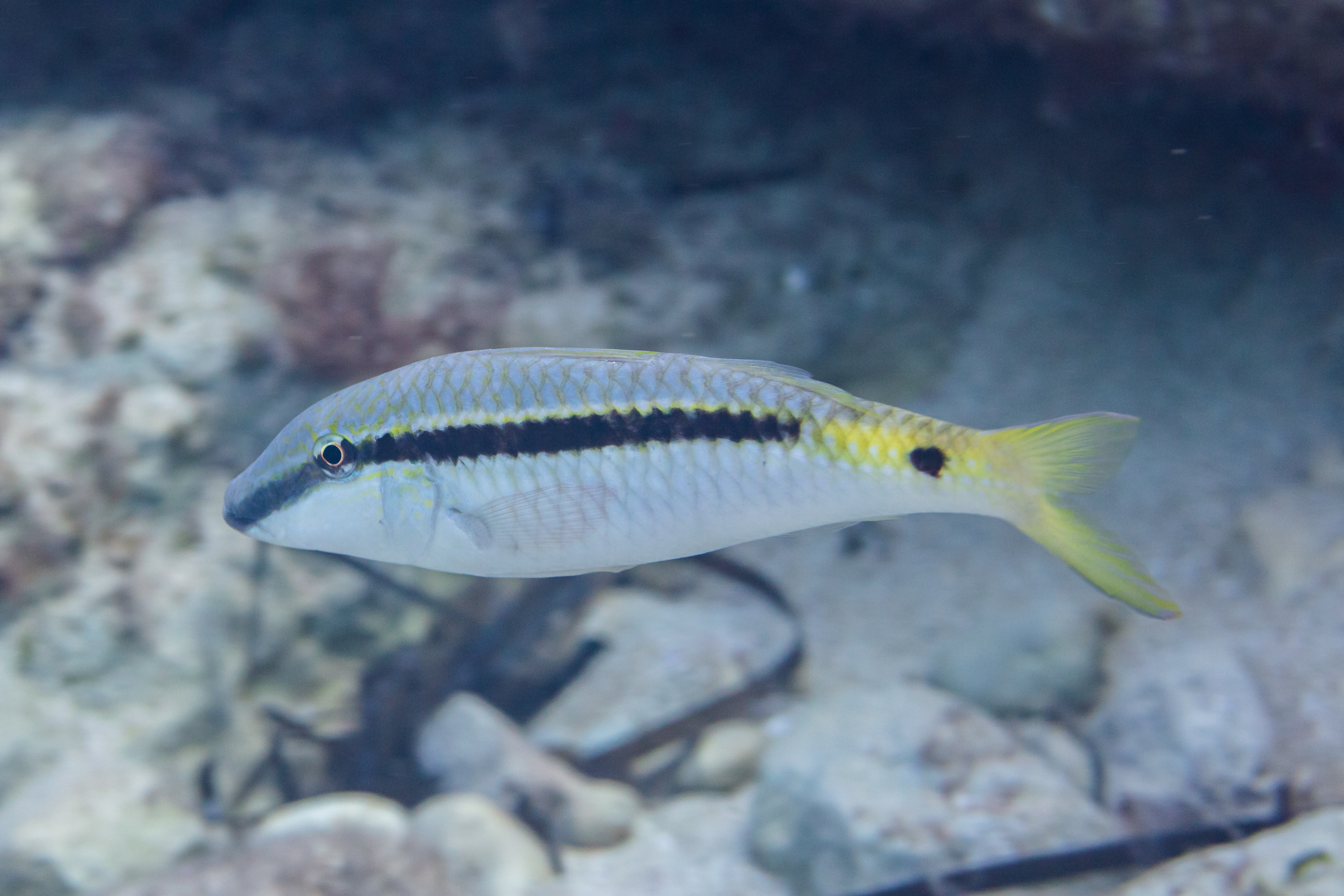
- Parupeneus forsskali in the Mediterranean Sea

Conservation status
- Least Concern (IUCN 3.1)

Scientific classification
- Kingdom: Animalia
- Phylum: Chordata
- Class: Actinopterygii
- Order: Syngnathiformes
- Family: Mullidae
- Genus: Parupeneus
- Species: P. forsskali

Binomial name
- Parupeneus forsskali (Fourmanoir & Guézé, 1976)

Synonyms
- Pseudupeneus forsskali Fourmanoir & Guézé, 1976; Mullus auriflamma Forsskål, 1775; Mulloides auriflamma (Forsskål, 1775); Mulloidichthys auriflamma (Forsskål, 1775)

= Parupeneus forsskali =

Species of fish

Parupeneus forsskali, common name Red Sea goatfish, is a species of goatfish belonging to the family Mullidae.

== Etymology ==
The species name forsskali honors the Swedish naturalist and explorer Peter Forsskål (1732-1763). Forsskål originally described this fish as Mullus auriflamma but the International Commission on Zoological Nomenclature suppressed this name in its decision number 846 and in 1976 Fourmanoir & Guézé proposed the name Pseudupeneus forsskali.

== Distribution and habitat ==
This species is endemic to the Red Sea and Gulf of Aden. It is also present in the Mediterranean Sea since its first confirmed record in 2012. These marine subtropical fish are shallow sandy bottoms, with a depth range 1–45 metres (3 ft 3 in – 147 ft 8 in).

== Description ==
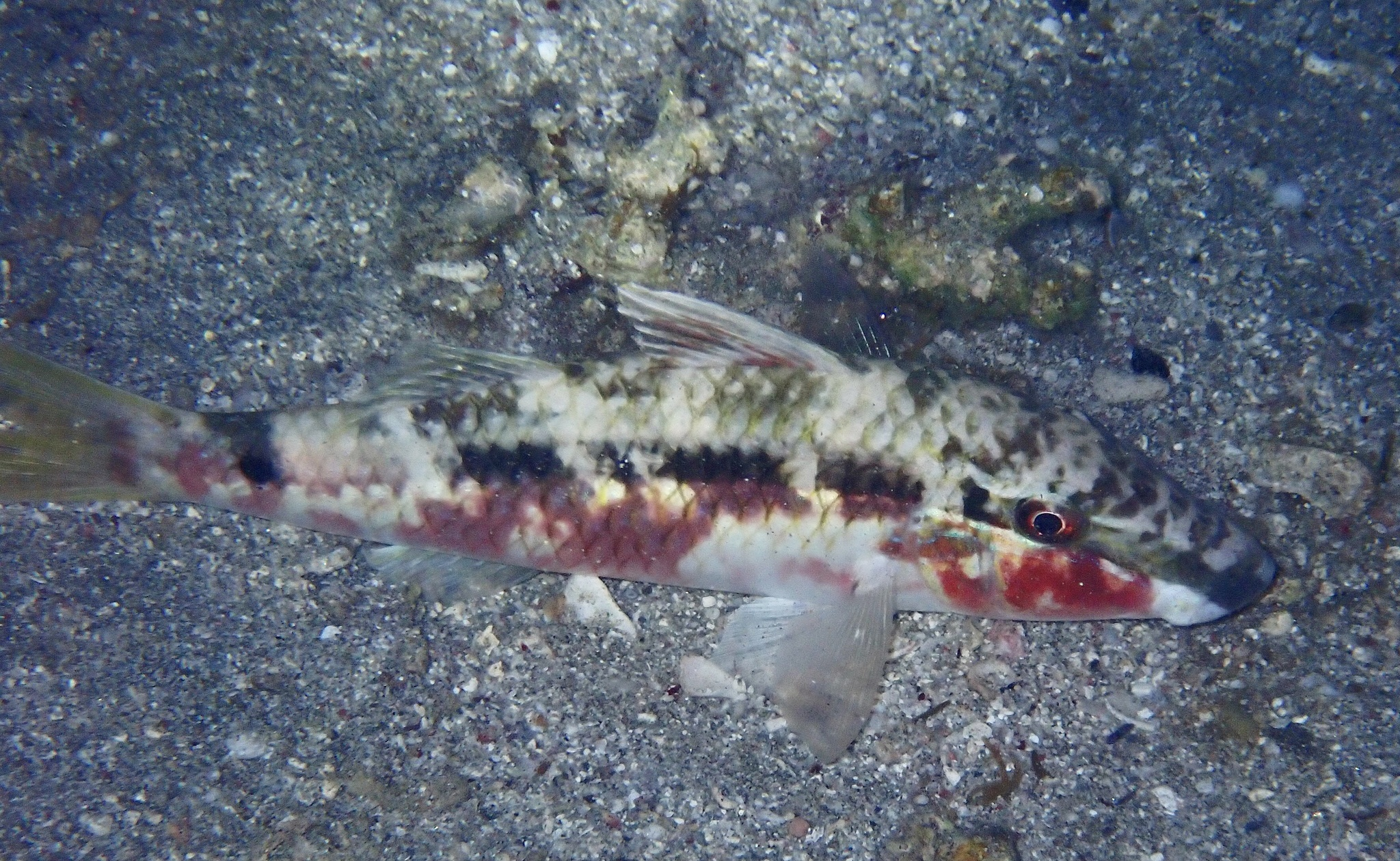
P. forsskali, showing red colouration

Parupeneus forsskali can reach a common length of about 25 centimetres (9.8 in), with a maximum length of 28 centimetres (11 in) in males. The Red Sea goatfish has a relatively elongate body and a pointed snout, with the twin chin barbels typical of goatfishes. These fish have eight dorsal spines, nine dorsal soft rays and seven anal soft rays. The body color is white with a broad black to dark brown stripe, sometimes tending to reddish, reaching from the upper lip through the eye and along the body, followed by an irregular roundish black spot at the base of the yellow caudal peduncle. Body above stripe is grayish green. The caudal fin is yellow, while the second dorsal and anal fins have narrow blue and yellow stripes.

== Biology ==
Red Sea goatfish spend most of their time moving slowly in small groups over the bottom searching for prey with their barbels. They mainly feed on small invertebrates living on sand bottoms (worms, small crustaceans).

Foraging footage

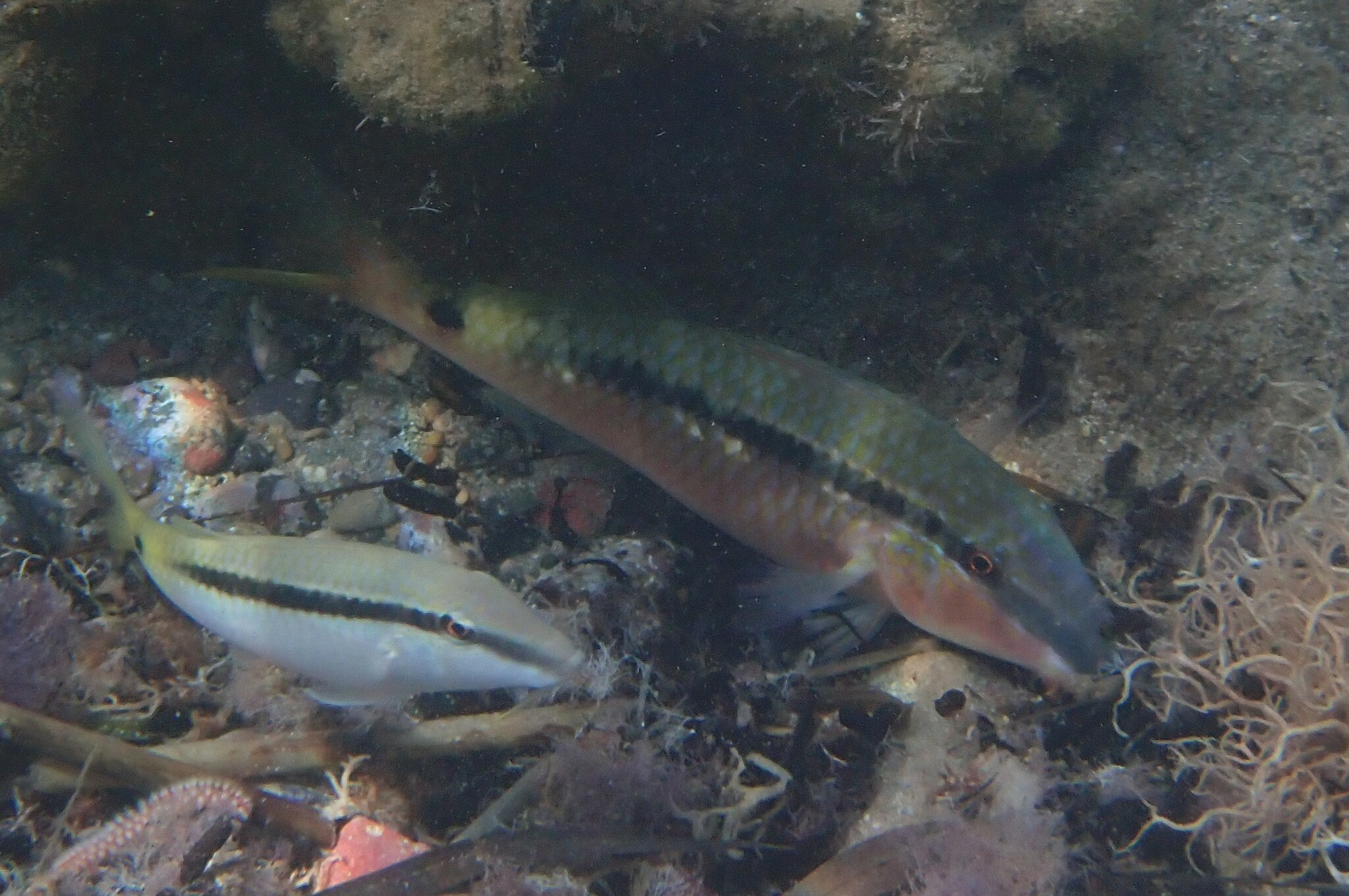
Showing both typical and reddish colour patterns

== Bibliography ==
- Fenner, Robert M.: The Conscientious Marine Aquarist. Neptune City, USA : T.F.H. Publications, 2001.
- Helfman, G., B. Collette y D. Facey: The diversity of fishes. Blackwell Science, Malden, Massachusetts, USA 1997.
- Hoese, D.F. 1986: . A M.M. Smith y P.C. Heemstra (eds.) Smiths' sea fishes. Springer-Verlag, Berlin
- Manal M. Sabrah - Fisheries biology of the Red Sea goatfish Parupeneus forsskali (Fourmanoir & Guézé, 1976) from the northern Red Sea, Hurghada, Egypt - The Egyptian Journal of Aquatic Research - Volume 41, Issue 1, 2015, Pages 111–117
- Maugé, L.A. 1986. A J. Daget, J.-P. Gosse y D.F.E. Thys van den Audenaerde (eds.) Check-list of the freshwater fishes of Africa (CLOFFA). ISNB Bruxelles.
- Moyle, P. y J. Cech.: Fishes: An Introduction to Ichthyology, 4th. Ed., Upper Saddle River, USA - Prentice-Hall. 2000.
- Nelson, J.: Fishes of the World, 3rd. ed. USA: John Wiley and Sons.1994.
- Randall, J.E. (2004) Revision of the goatfish genus Parupeneus (Perciformes: Mullidae), with descriptions of two new species., Indo-Pacific Fishes (36):64 p
- Steven Weinberg - Découvrir la mer Rouge et l'océan Indien (2005)
- Wheeler, A.: The World Encyclopedia of Fishes, 2nd. Ed, London: Macdonald. Año
