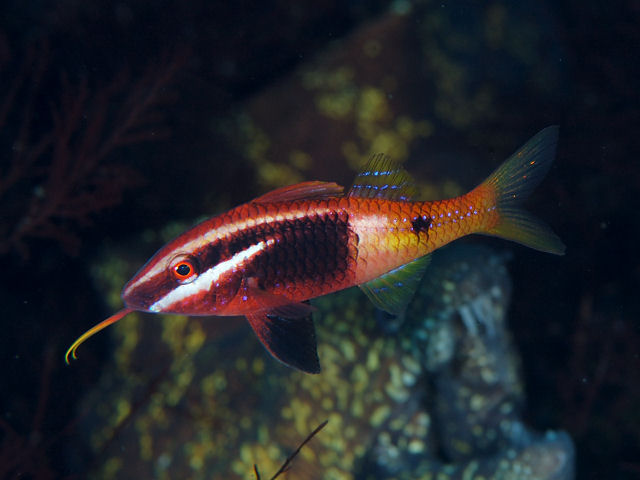

Conservation status
- Least Concern (IUCN 3.1)

Scientific classification
- Kingdom: Animalia
- Phylum: Chordata
- Class: Actinopterygii
- Order: Syngnathiformes
- Family: Mullidae
- Genus: Parupeneus
- Species: P. barberinoides

Binomial name
- Parupeneus barberinoides (Bleeker, 1852)

Synonyms
- Upeneus barberinoides Bleeker, 1852; Pseudopeneus barberinoides (Bleeker, 1852)

= Parupeneus barberinoides =

Species of ray-finned fish

Parupeneus barberinoides, the bicolor goatfish, is a species of goatfish native to the western Pacific Ocean. An inhabitant of coral reefs, it can be found at depths of from 1 to 40 metres (3.3 to 131.2 ft). This species can reach a length of 30 centimetres (12 in) TL though most are only around 20 centimetres (7.9 in). This is a commercially important species and can also be found in the aquarium trade.
