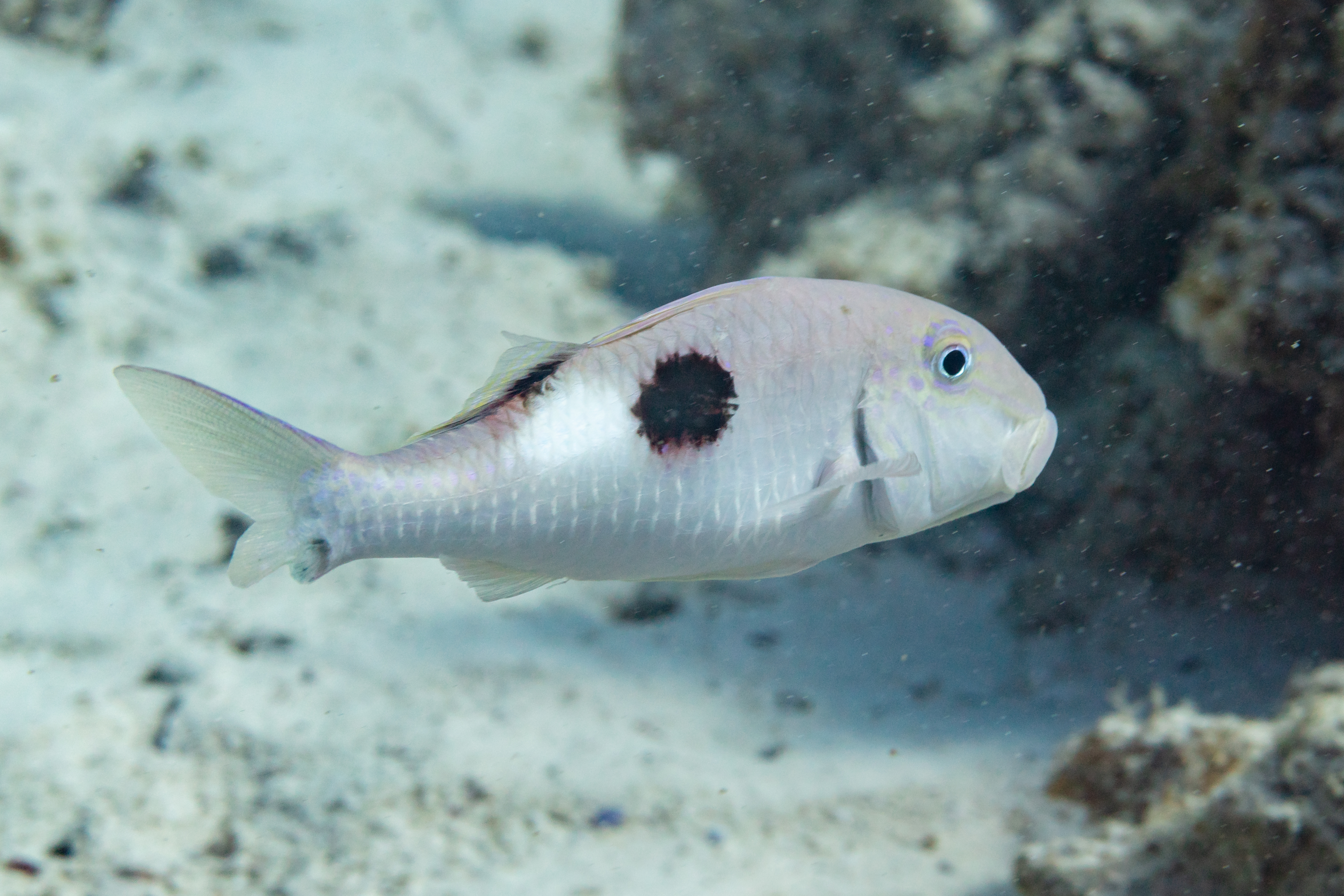
- Feeding on the bottom

Conservation status
- Least Concern (IUCN 3.1)

Scientific classification
- Kingdom: Animalia
- Phylum: Chordata
- Class: Actinopterygii
- Order: Syngnathiformes
- Family: Mullidae
- Genus: Parupeneus
- Species: P. pleurostigma

Binomial name
- Parupeneus pleurostigma (Bennett, 1831)

Synonyms
- Upeneus pleurostigma Bennett, 1831; Pseudupeneus pleurostigma (Bennett, 1831); Upeneus brandesii Bleeker, 1851; Parupeneus brandesii (Bleeker, 1851); Pseudupeneus brandesii (Bleeker, 1851)

= Parupeneus pleurostigma =

Species of fish

Parupeneus pleurostigma, commonly known as the sidespot goatfish and round-spot goatfish, is a marine fish belonging to the family Mullidae.

== Distribution ==
This species is native to the Indian and Pacific oceans, from East Africa to Hawaii, Line Islands, Marquesas Islands and Tuamotus, from Ryukyu to Lord Howe Island, Rapa Iti and French Polynesia.

== Habitat ==
These tropical benthopelagic goatfishes can be found mainly in island waters and occur on coral and rocky seaward reefs, over sandy and coral bottoms and in shallow lagoons, to a depth of 40–120 metres (130–390 ft).

== Description ==
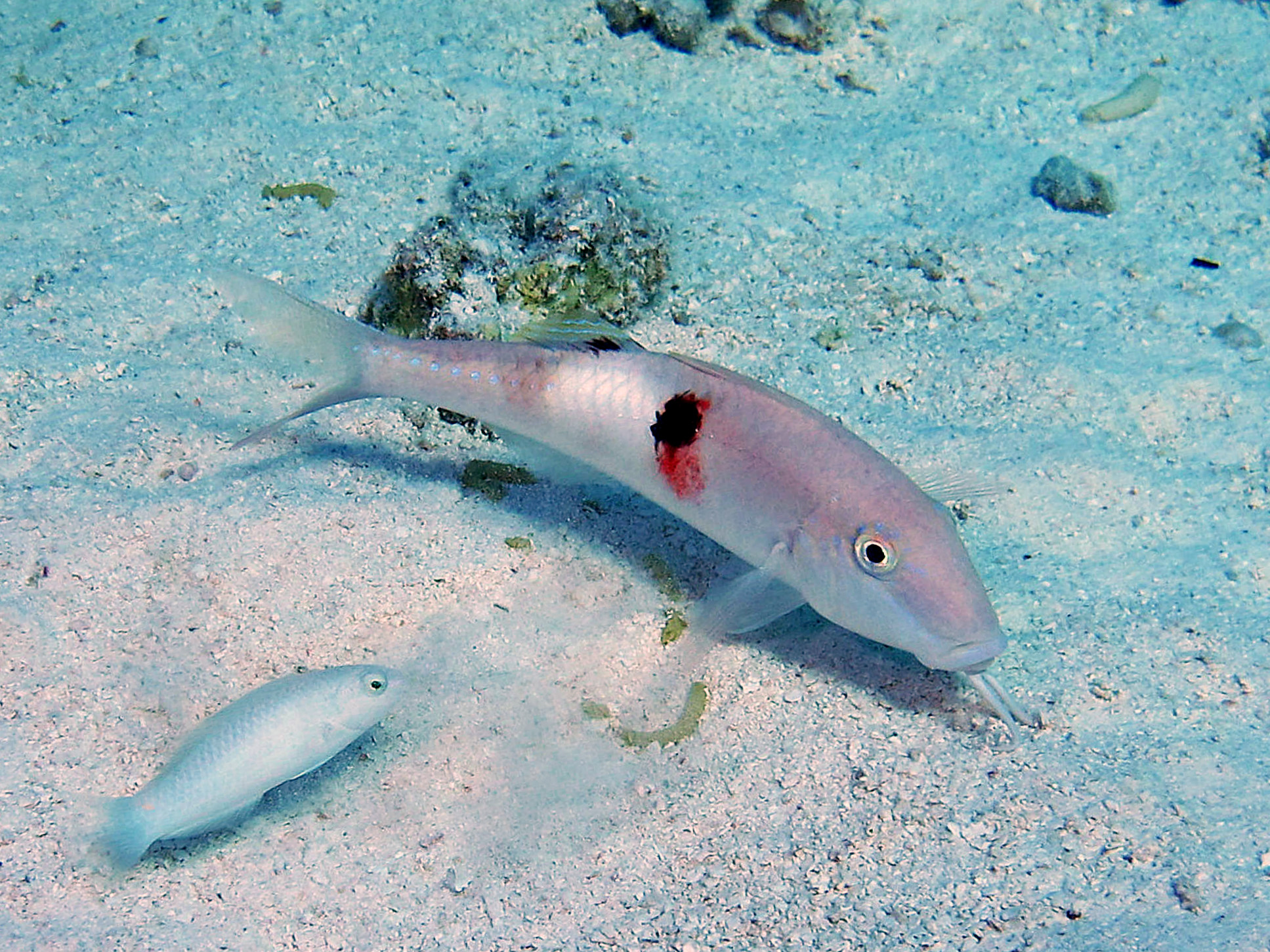
Sidespot goatfish

Parupeneus pleurostigma can reach a length of 20–33 centimetres (7.9–13.0 in). They have nine dorsal soft rays, seven anal soft ray and sixteen pectoral rays. Snout is slightly convex and the margin of caudal-fin lobes is straight to slightly convex.

Body color range from pinkish to yellowish gray, with a broad black spot on lateral line, sometimes followed by a large pinkish spot. A black band is present below the basal dorsal fin and blue spots on the scales above lateral line. The two barbels extending form the chin are pale pink to white.

== Biology ==
These goatfishes are usually solitary. They feed during the day on small fish and invertebrates, as gastropods, crabs, crustaceans (mainly crabs and shrimps), polychaetes and worms, foraminiferans, brittle stars and heart urchins, found by means of the two barbels.
