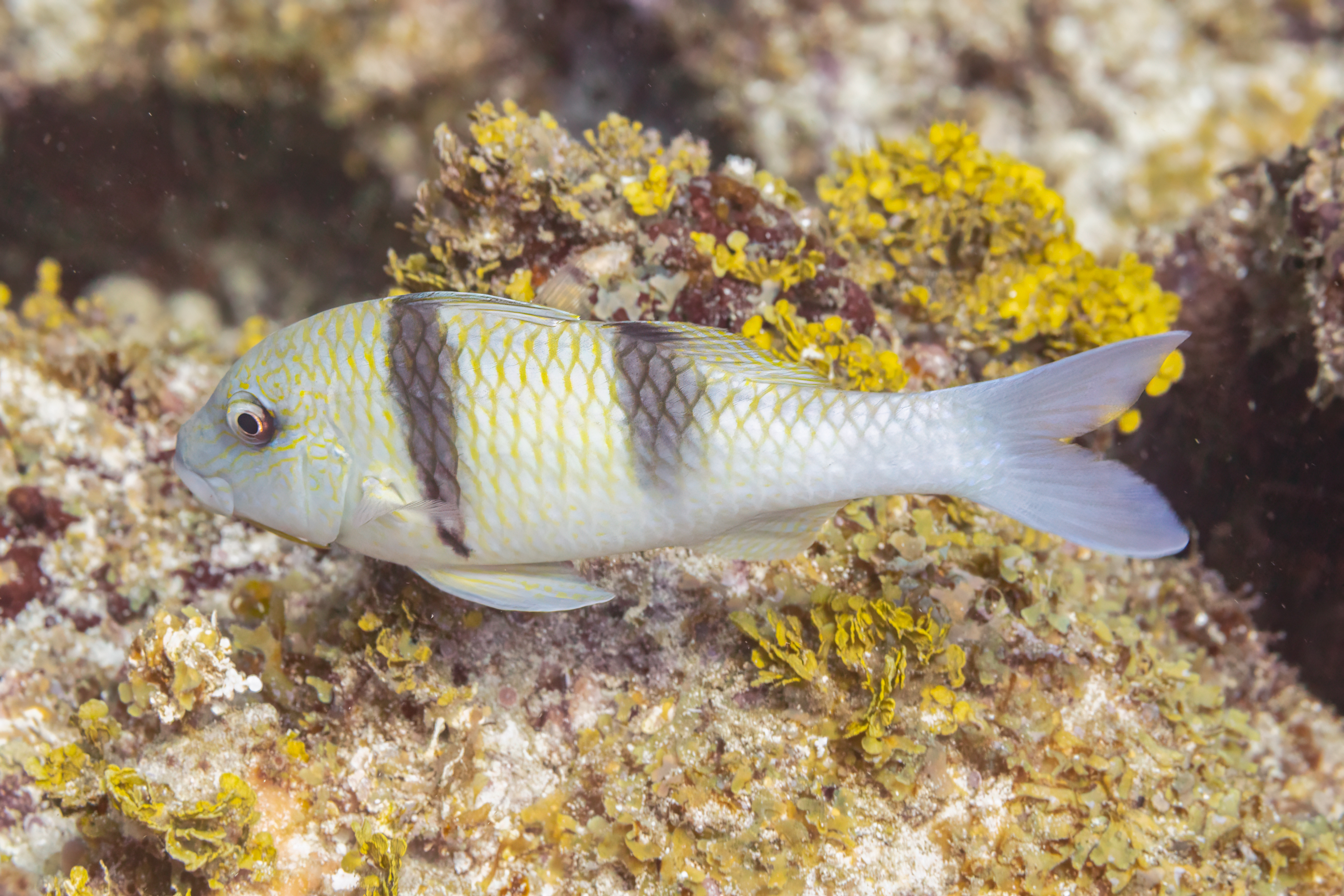

Scientific classification
- Kingdom: Animalia
- Phylum: Chordata
- Class: Actinopterygii
- Division: Teleostei
- Order: Syngnathiformes
- Family: Mullidae
- Genus: Parupeneus
- Species: P. trifasciatus

Binomial name
- Parupeneus trifasciatus Lacépède, 1801

Synonyms
- Mullus trifasciatus

= Parupeneus trifasciatus =

Species of fish

Parupeneus trifasciatus, also called the doublebar goatfish, is a marine fish in the family Mullidae.
