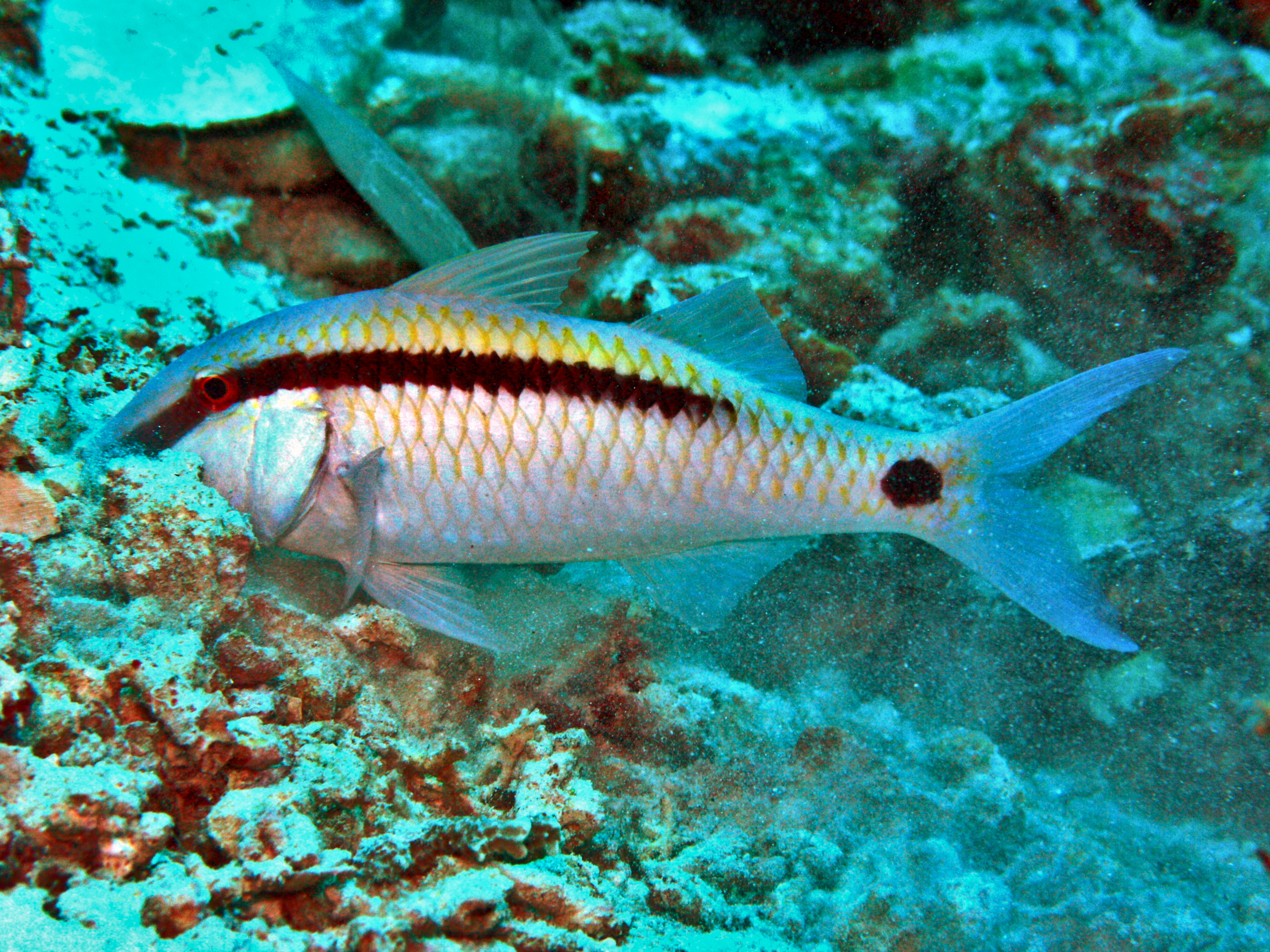

Conservation status
- Least Concern (IUCN 3.1)

Scientific classification
- Kingdom: Animalia
- Phylum: Chordata
- Class: Actinopterygii
- Division: Teleostei
- Order: Syngnathiformes
- Family: Mullidae
- Genus: Parupeneus
- Species: P. barberinus

Binomial name
- Parupeneus barberinus (Lacépède, 1801)

Synonyms
- Mullus barberinus Lacépède, 1801; Pseudupeneus barberinus (Lacépède, 1801)

= Dash-and-dot goatfish =

Species of fish

The dash-and-dot goatfish (Parupeneus barberinus) is a species of goatfish native to the Indian and Pacific oceans.

== Description ==
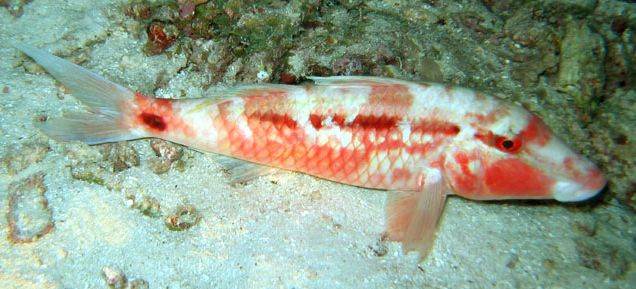
Red variation of dash-and-dot goatfish are found in deeper waters

The dash-and-dot goatfish has the twin chin barbels typical of goatfishes. The body color is white with a black to dark brown stripe (dash) reaching from the upper lip through the eye and along the body, followed by a black spot (dot) at the base of the caudal fin. Above the stripe, the body has a yellowish tint. Dash-and-dot goatfish from deeper water will usually have red stripes and spots. They can reach a maximum length of 60 cm, making them the largest of the family Mullidae.

== Distribution and habitat ==
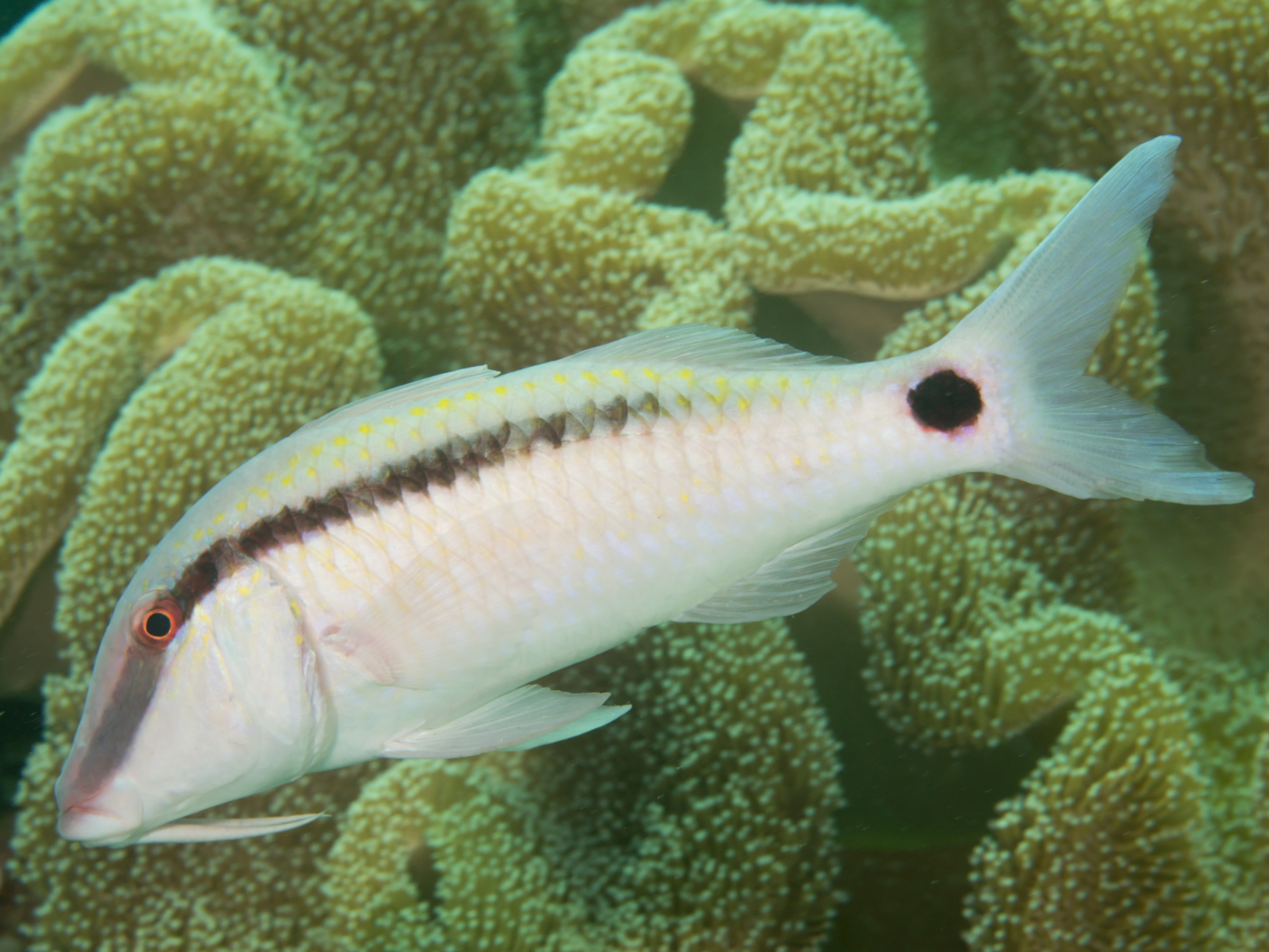
In Indonesia

The dash-and-dot goatfish is considered one of the most abundant species of Parupeneus, and is found in the Indian and western Pacific Oceans, the east coast of Africa, and the Gulf of Aden to Micronesia and southern Japan to Australia. It is found off reef flats and lagoons on sandy bottoms up to 100 m deep.

== Diet ==
Dash-and-dot goatfish spend most of their time moving slowly over the bottom searching for prey with their barbels. Their diet includes worms, small crustaceans, and small fish.
