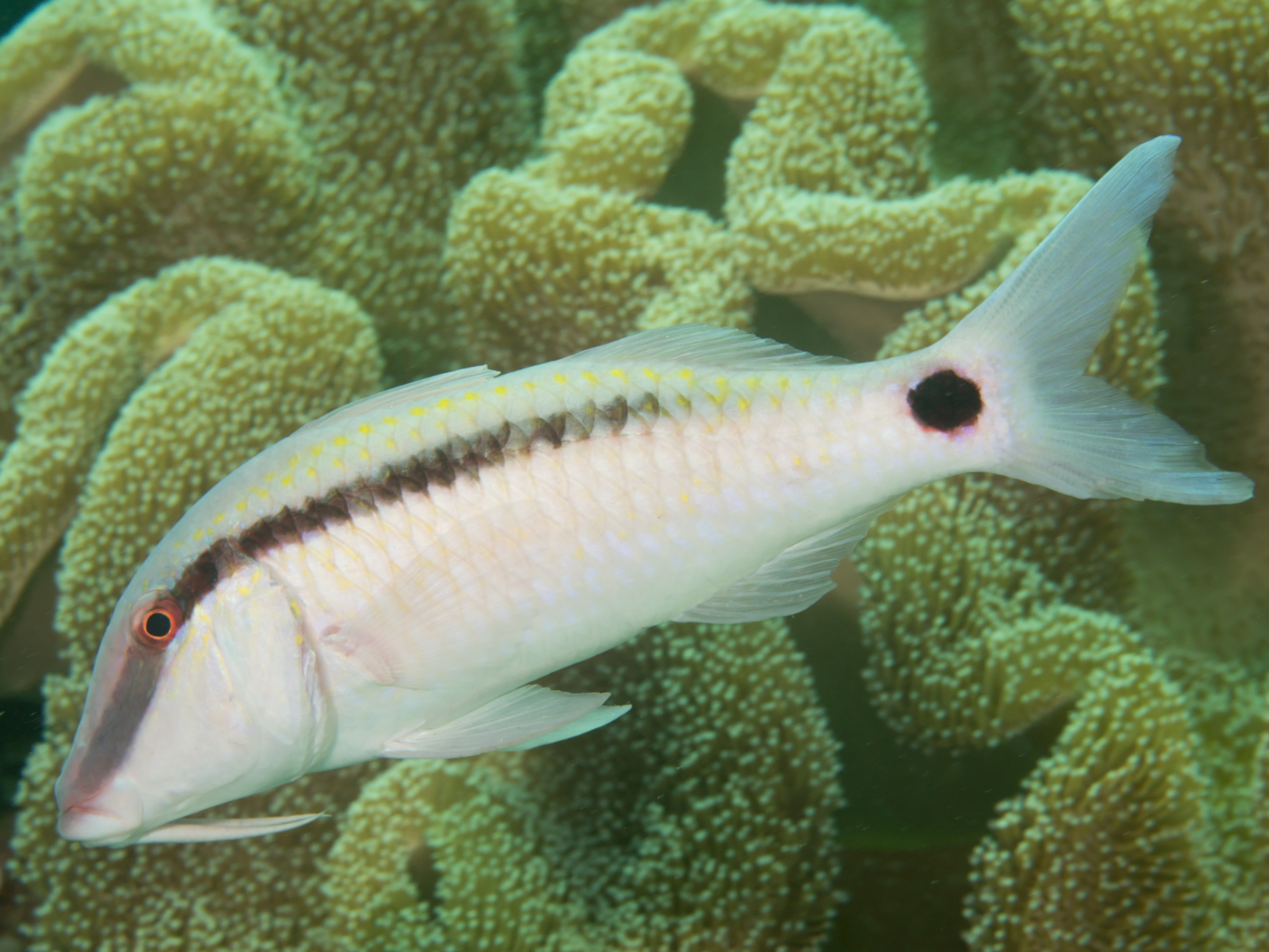
- Dash-and-dot goatfish (Parupeneus barberinus)

Scientific classification
- Kingdom: Animalia
- Phylum: Chordata
- Class: Actinopterygii
- Order: Syngnathiformes
- Family: Mullidae
- Genus: Parupeneus; Bleeker, 1863

Type species
- Mullus barberinus Cuvier, 1829

Synonyms
- Hogbinia Whitley, 1929; Barbupeneus Whitley, 1931; Caprupeneus Whitley, 1931

= Parupeneus =

Genus of ray-finned fishes

Parupeneus is a genus of goatfishes native to the Indian and Pacific oceans.

== Species ==
There are currently 32 recognized species in this genus:

| Species | Common name | Image |
|---|---|---|
| Parupeneus angulatus Randall & Heemstra, 2009 | | |
| Parupeneus barberinoides (Bleeker, 1852) | Bicolor goatfish | |
| Parupeneus barberinus (Lacépède, 1801) | Dash-and-dot goatfish | |
| Parupeneus biaculeatus (Richardson, 1846) | Pointed goatfish | |
| Parupeneus chrysonemus (Jordan & Evermann, 1903) | Yellow-threaded goatfish | |
| Parupeneus chrysopleuron (Temminck & Schlegel, 1843) | Yellow striped goatfish | |
| Parupeneus ciliatus (Lacepède, 1802) | Whitesaddle goatfish | |
| Parupeneus crassilabris (Valenciennes, 1831) | | |
| Parupeneus cyclostomus (Lacepède, 1801) | | |
| Parupeneus diagonalis Randall, 2004 | | |
| Parupeneus forsskali (Fourmanoir & Guézé, 1976) | Red Sea goatfish | |
| Parupeneus fraserorum Randall & King, 2009 | | |
| Parupeneus heptacanthus (Lacepède, 1802) | Cinnabar goatfish | |
| Parupeneus indicus (Shaw, 1803) | Indian goatfish | |
| Parupeneus insularis Randall & Myers, 2002 | Twosaddle goatfish | |
| Parupeneus jansenii (Bleeker, 1856) | Jansen's goatfish | |
| Parupeneus louise Randall, 2004 | | |
| Parupeneus macronemus (Lacepède, 1801) | Long-barbel goatfish | |
| Parupeneus margaritatus Randall & Guézé, 1984 | Pearly goatfish | |
| Parupeneus minys Randall & Heemstra, 2009 | | |
| Parupeneus moffitti Randall & Myers, 1993 | | |
| Parupeneus multifasciatus (Quoy & Gaimard, 1825) | Manybar goatfish | |
| Parupeneus nansen Randall & Heemstra, 2009 | | |
| Parupeneus orientalis (Fowler, 1933) | Rapanui goatfish | |
| Parupeneus pleurostigma (Bennett, 1831) | Sidespot goatfish | |
| Parupeneus porphyreus (Jenkins, 1903) | | |
| Parupeneus posteli Fourmanoir & Guézé, 1967 | | |
| Parupeneus procerigena Kim & Amaoka, 2001 | | |
| Parupeneus rubescens (Lacepède, 1801) | Rosy goatfish | |
| Parupeneus seychellensis (J. L. B. Smith & Smith, 1963) | | |
| Parupeneus spilurus (Bleeker, 1854) | Blackspot goatfish | |
| Parupeneus trifasciatus (Lacepède, 1801) | Doublebar goatfish | |

== Gallery ==
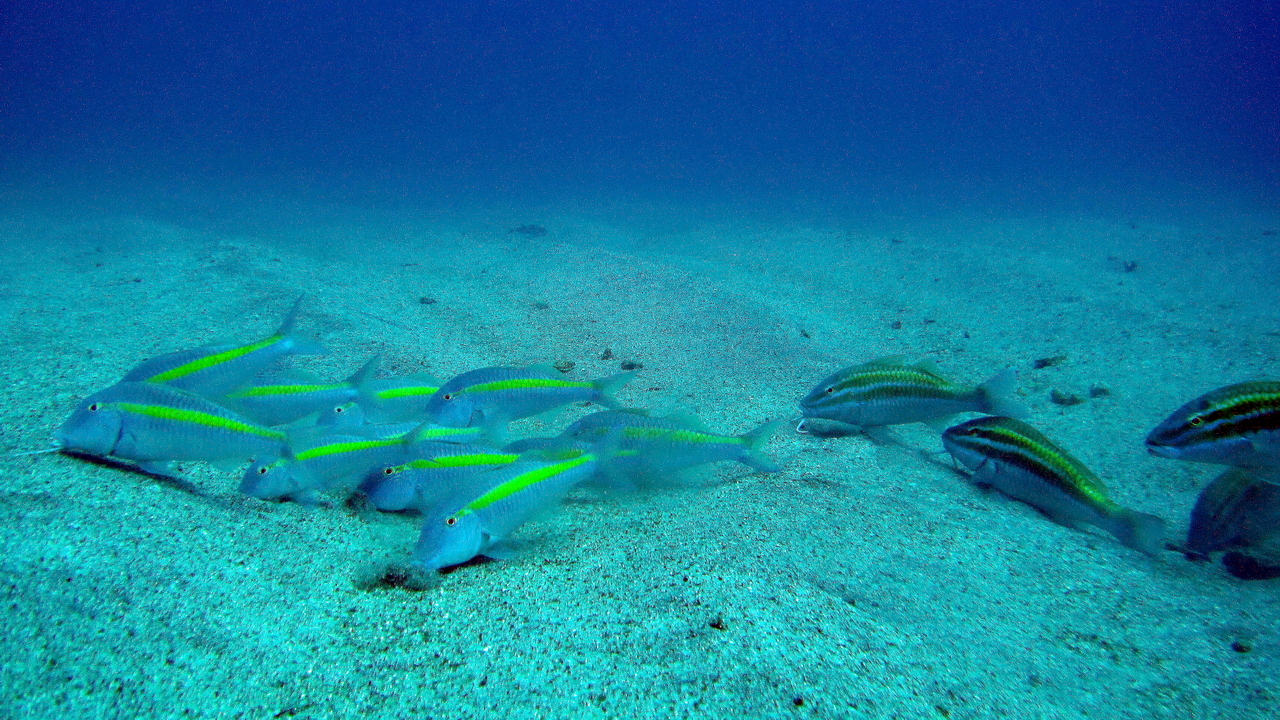
A school of yellow-striped goatfish (P. chrysopleuron) and whitesaddle goatfish searching food on the sandy bottom, northeast coast, Taiwan

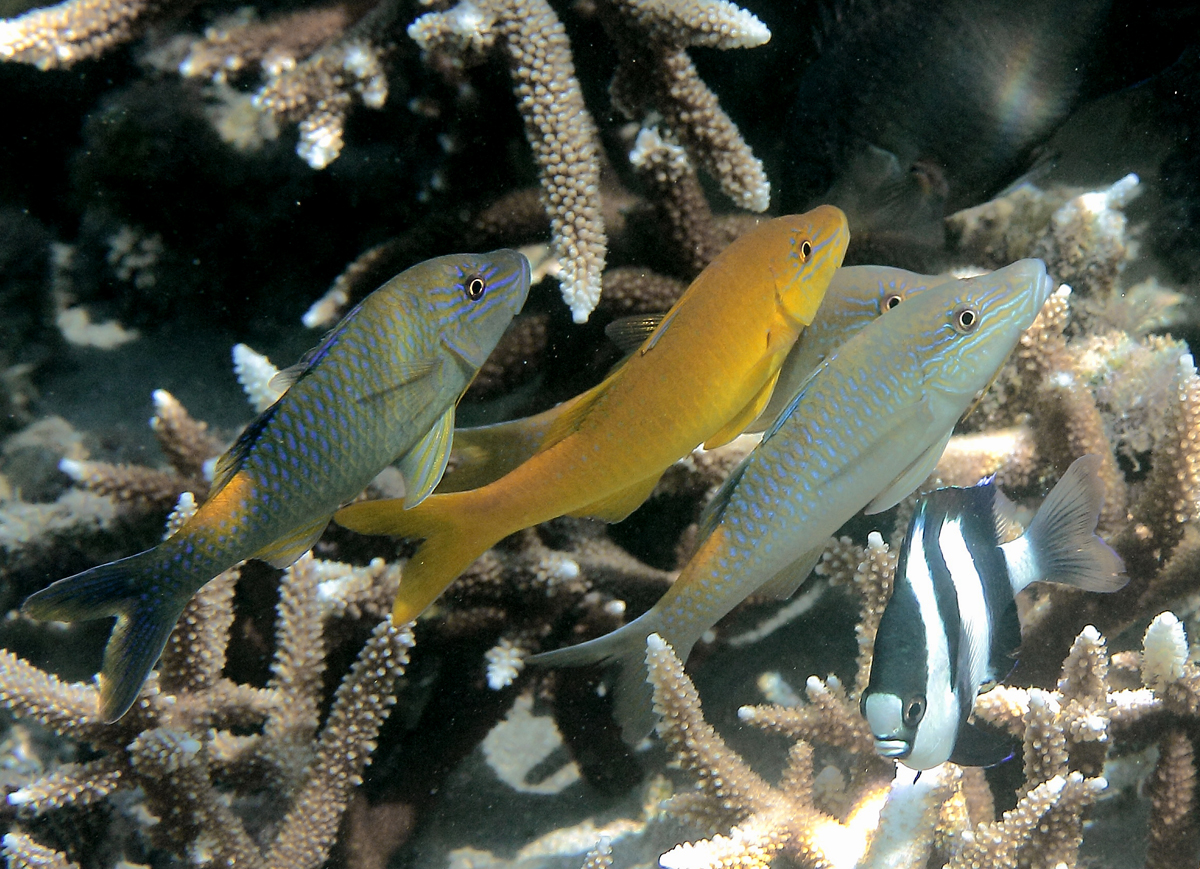
Goldsaddle goatfish (P. cyclostomus) in two different robes.

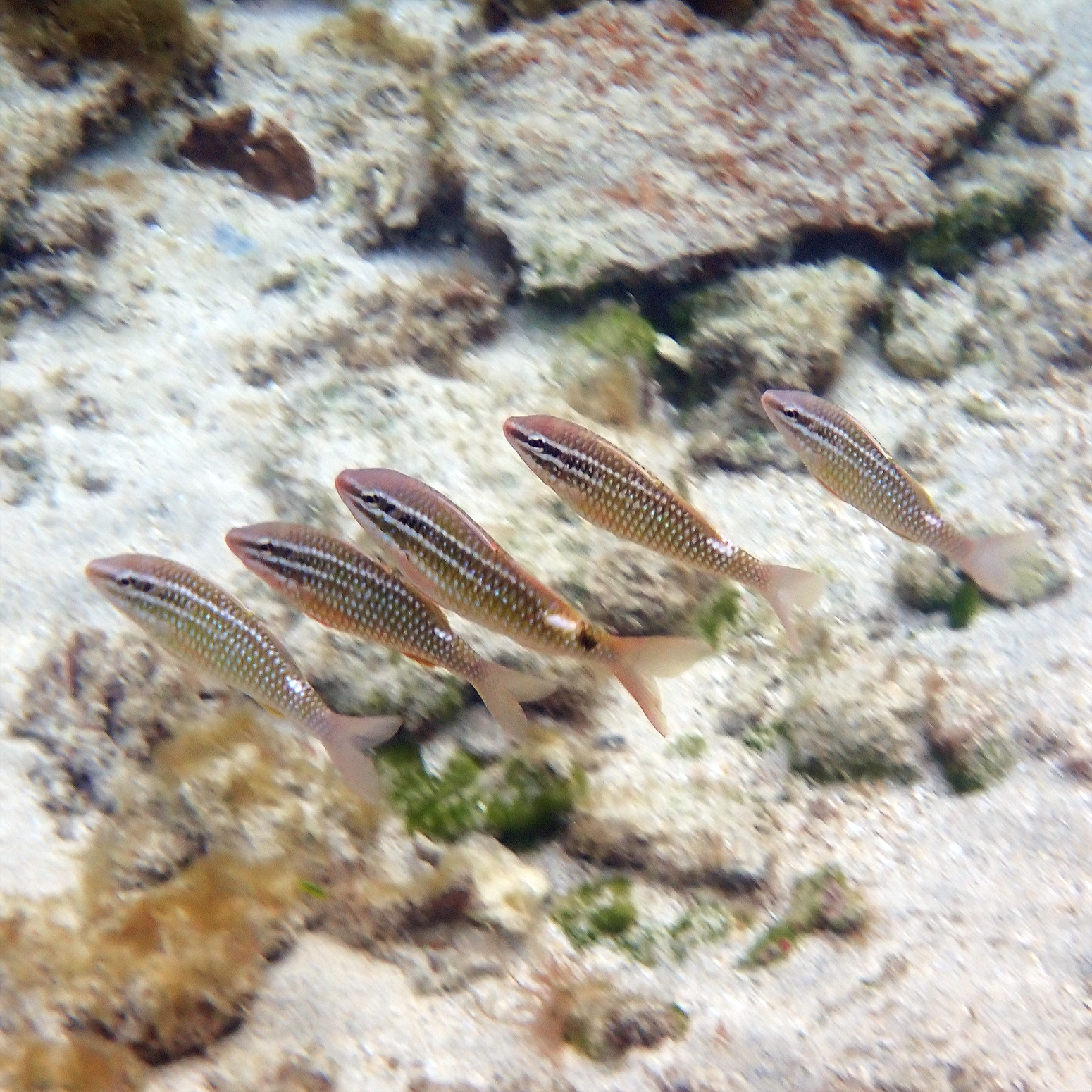
P. spilurus (middle) schooling with P. ciliatus
