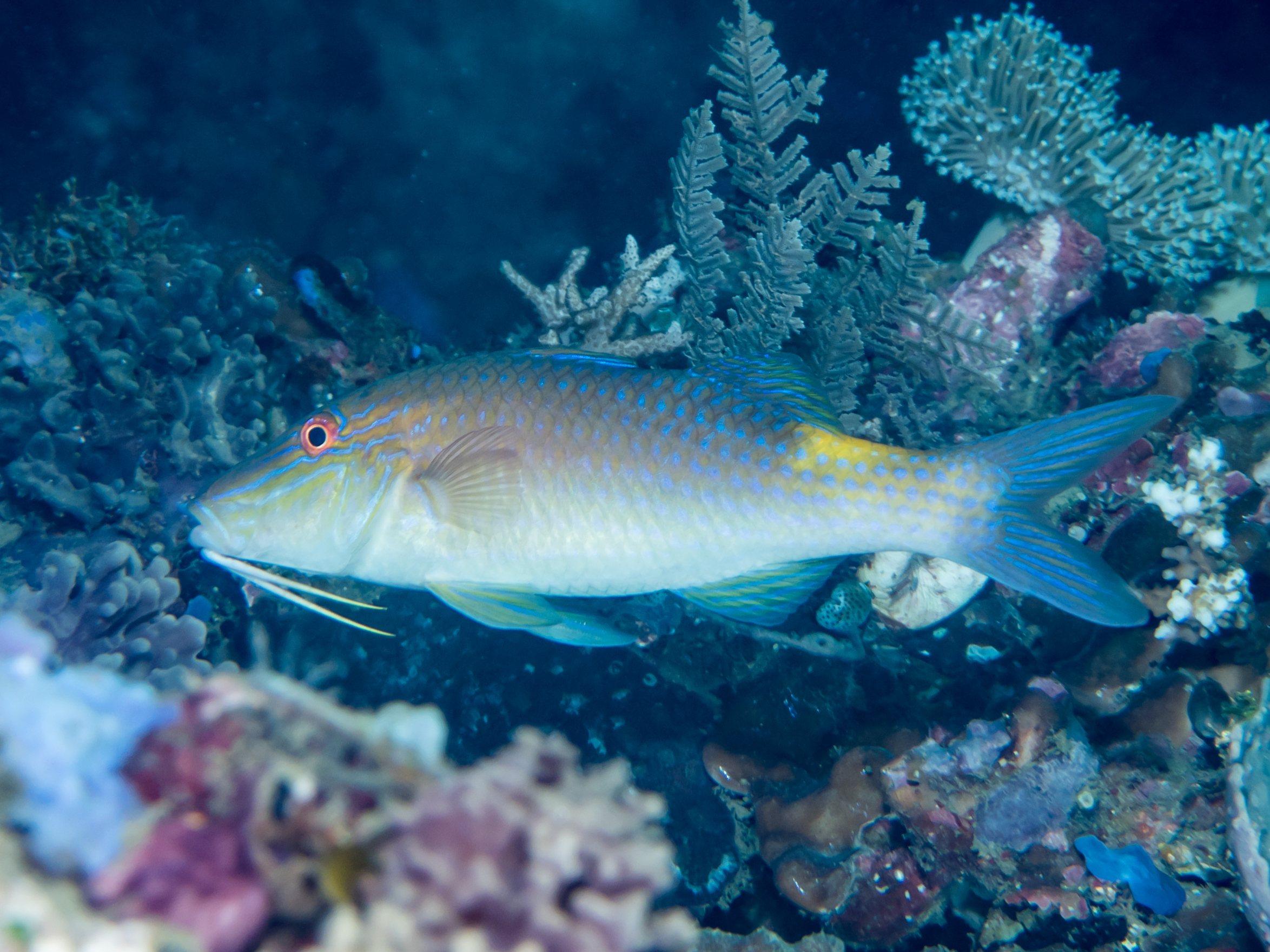

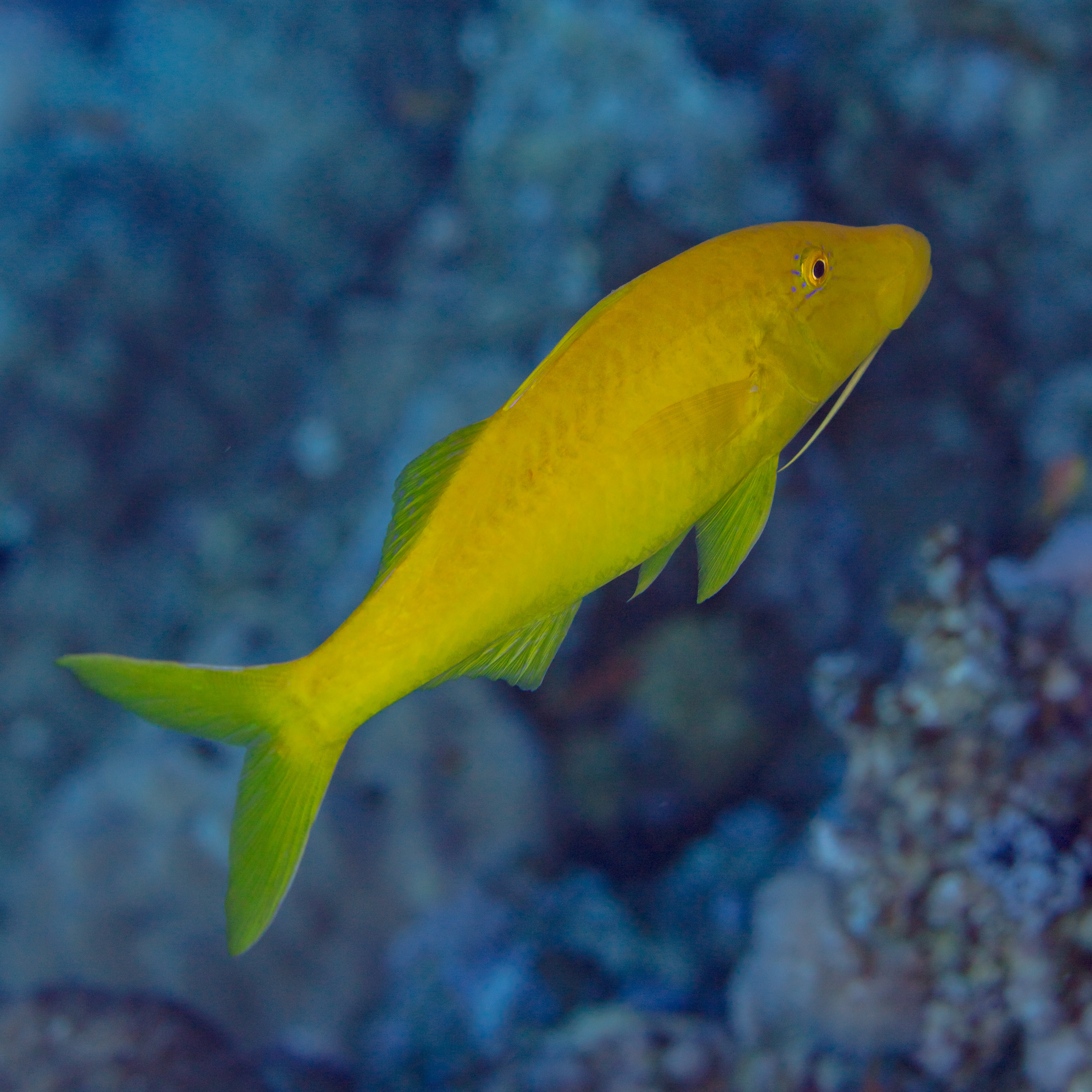
- Yellow phase

Conservation status
- Least Concern (IUCN 3.1)

Scientific classification
- Kingdom: Animalia
- Phylum: Chordata
- Class: Actinopterygii
- Division: Teleostei
- Order: Syngnathiformes
- Family: Mullidae
- Genus: Parupeneus
- Species: P. cyclostomus

Binomial name
- Parupeneus cyclostomus (Lacépède, 1801)

Synonyms
- See text

= Parupeneus cyclostomus =

Species of fish

Parupeneus cyclostomus, commonly known as the yellow-saddle goatfish, blue goatfish or bright goatfish, is one of 66 currently known species of goatfish. The characteristic yellow patch, or saddle, located on the upper part of the fish's caudal peduncle, gives the yellow-saddle goatfish their common name. Different life stages of this fish may be found at varying depths, however, most yellow-saddle goatfish remain at around 20 metres (70 ft) of depth or in coastal regions with reefs. They can be found in isolation or small schools, and often rely on each other for hunting purposes. Native to the Indo-Pacific, this reef-dweller occurs primarily in tropical and temperate habitats. It is a commercially important species and has recently been considered an environmental indicator to gauge the impact of habitat modification, coastal degradation, pollution, and commercial fisheries. Yellow-saddle goatfish, along with other species of goatfish, is of high economic importance in many parts of the world as both a source of food and for the aquarium trade. Goatfish are often sought out as game fish, though they have been reported to carry the ciguatera toxin.

== Habitat and distribution ==
Goatfish are a versatile species that exhibit varied behaviors depending on their age and environment. This fish occurs solitarily or in groups when young, in all areas of the coral reefs and detrital bottom areas from 1 to 95 m (0 to 310 ft) deep. They can be found in reef flats, rocky bottoms, lagoons, and seaweed reefs.

Juveniles can typically be found in small schools however, adults usually live a solitary lifestyle except for when hunting. Young goatfish are most abundant in seagrass beds, as they pose an important feeding ground for many juvenile fishes. Often, these fish form heterotypic schools, meaning they may school with other species of fishes, such as wrasses, other species of goatfish, or other reef-dwelling species. The formation of heterotypic schools allows goatfish to benefit from collaborative hunting, and even camouflage.

The fish are commonly found inhabiting diverse ecosystems of coral reefs where they thrive in temperate, tropical, and sub-tropical waters. These environments provide an ideal habitat for yellow-saddle goatfish due to the readily available shelter, food, and conspecifics. The geographic range of these fish spans the Indo-Pacific and Atlantic oceans from the Red Sea to South Africa, the Hawaiian Islands, and the Ryukyu Islands. Additionally, their range covers the islands of French Polynesia and the Ogasawara Islands. Goatfish tend to prefer habitats that have abundant reef structures, so they are usually absent from areas where reefs are sparse or nonexistent.

== Description ==
It can reach 50 cm (20 in) in total length, though most do not exceed 35 cm (14 in). The size variations may depend on many factors including age, habitat conditions, and resource availability.

Goatfish have dorsal spines that range from 2.79–3.05 centimetres (1.1–1.2 in) long. These spines provide protection against predators and help make them very efficient swimmers. In addition to spines, these fish also typically have elongated snouts, which has two characteristic barbels extending approximately 3 centimetres (1.2 in) in length, but can extend longer than the fish's entire head.

=== Colour phases ===
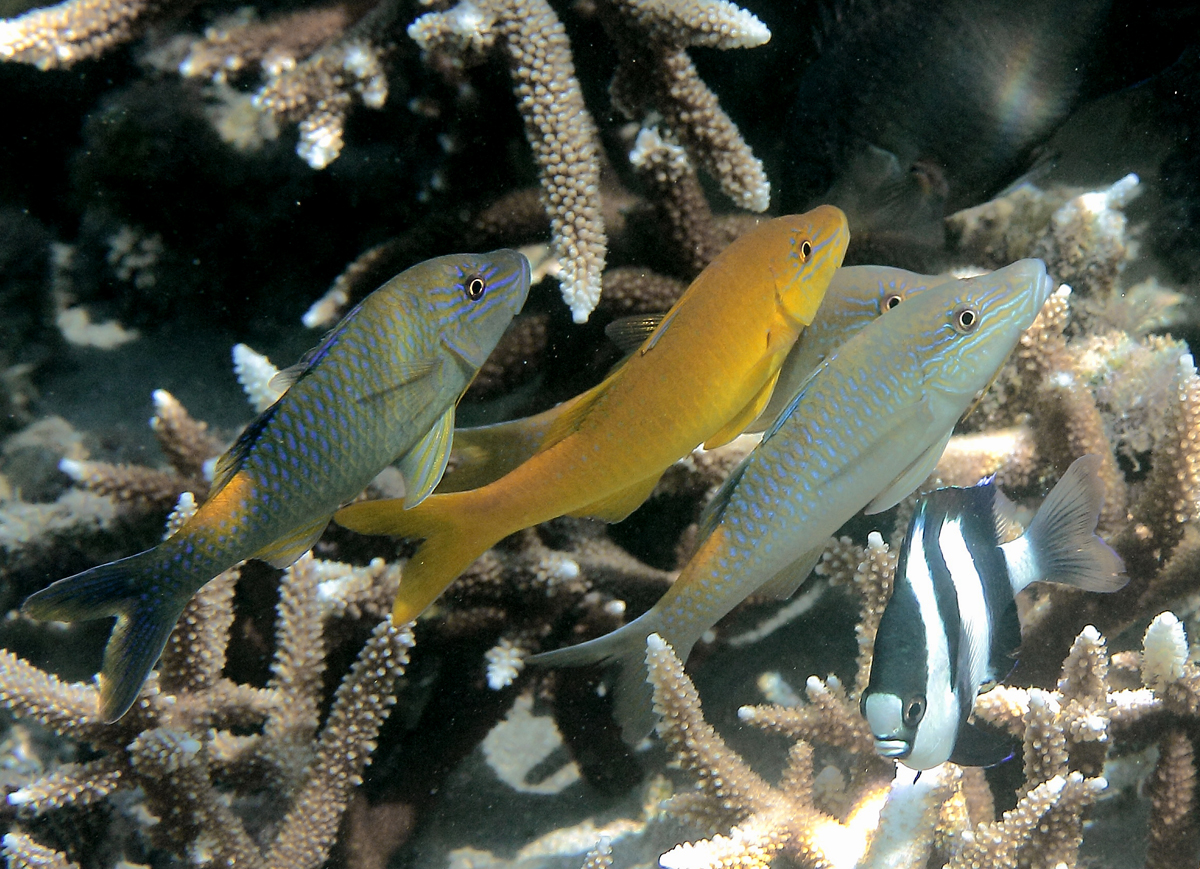
Both colour phases together, at Reunion

There are two main color phases of this fish, however, other variants of goatfish exist. The most common color variant has a pale ventral side with a striking blue-green dorsal side that may contain vibrant blue hues or spots. One of the most recognizable features of this fish is a bright yellow patch (saddle) placed on the upper half of the caudal peduncle. This distinctive patch is characteristic of these fish and gives them the name 'saddled' goatfish. It is thought that this patch serves as an identifying marker to members of the same species or provides these fish with camouflage in vibrant coral habitats. The less common color phase of the fish is entirely yellow or golden. After eating, these fish will develop a pinkish hue on their dorsal side, with a visibly brighter yellow spot on the upper part of the caudal peduncle.

== Diet and feeding ==
Goatfish have a diverse diet that primarily consists of worms, invertebrates, and even other small fish or crustaceans. This species is opportunistic, and will usually feed on whatever prey is the most readily available. Their very generalized diet and unique hunting strategy highlight this species as a key predator of the coastal reef environment.

A defining feature of this fish is its distinctive pair of chemosensory barbels located on the fish's chin. The barbels are extremely sensitive, making them essential tools for foraging and navigating through the complex structures of coral reefs. While hunting, the fish will use these barbels to sift through sand and other soft materials to detect hidden worms, crustaceans, or other small fishes. In addition to its foraging technique, goatfish engage in cooperative hunting strategies. These tactics involve multiple fish each occupying different roles. Each fish may perform the duties of a chaser, a blocker, or a cluster fish. The "chaser" will typically attack or pursue the prey directly, a "blocker" strategically positions themselves to prevent prey from escaping, and "cluster" fish work with the blocker to corner prey and ensure successful capture. This behavior highlights the yellow-saddle goatfish's ability to adapt to complex reef structures.

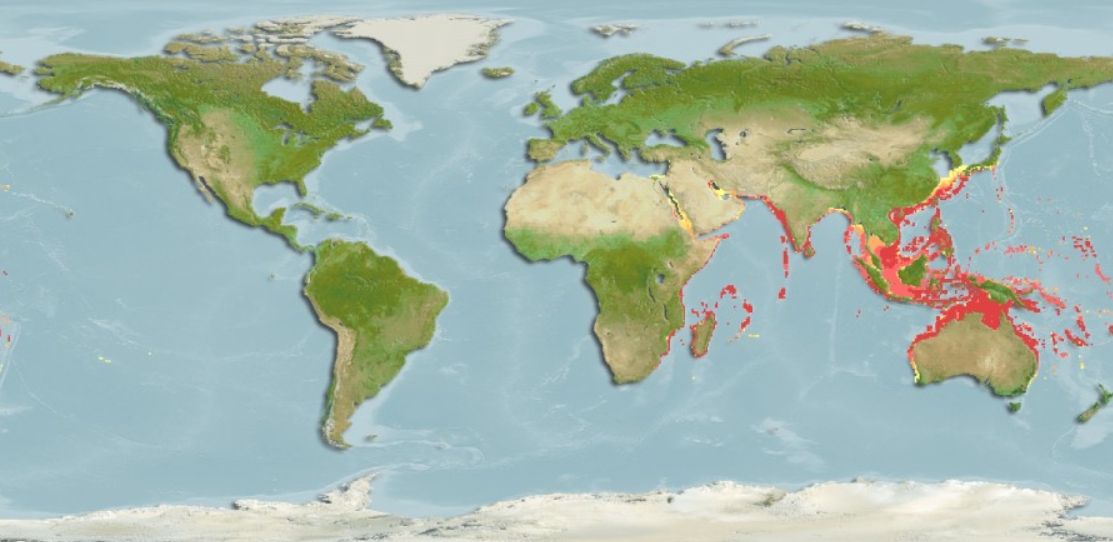
Geographic range yellow-saddle goatfish are found. The red coloration represents where the fish are found in the highest populations.

== Reproduction ==
The yellow-saddle goatfish typically lives to be about five years old, though individuals in captivity have been reported to live up to eight years. Most fish reach sexual maturity at about two years of age, though detailed information about their breeding habits is limited. This species is oviparous, meaning they lay eggs, which are then fertilized outside of the female's body. After being laid, male goatfish guard the extremely buoyant eggs until they are ready to hatch.

Once the yellow-saddle goatfish emerges from the egg, larvae drift in the water for about four to eight weeks. During the end of this period, the fish begin to develop their characteristic, lengthy barbels that allow for bottom feeding. However many individuals of this stage continue to feed on plankton until they metamorphize and transition into their adult form.

== Conservation status ==
From a conservation perspective, these fish are classified as a species of least concern. The species is abundant in a variety of different shallow habitats. Additionally, it is widely distributed throughout many coastal regions in the Atlantic Ocean, and around tropical islands. Though it has been impacted by human activity and commercial fisheries, these are not considered a major threat to the Yellow-saddle goatfish population.

Despite Yellow-saddle goatfish populations being relatively stable, many things may still pose a threat to the species. Current trends indicate that reef and coastal habitats are declining, which are vital for many fishes that rely on these habitats for shelter, food, or reproduction.

== Synonyms ==
Several other names have been applied to this species that have been subsequently determined to be junior synonyms:

- Mullus cyclostomus Lacépède, 1801
- Pseudupeneus cyclostomus (Lacépède, 1801)
- Mullus chryserydros Lacépède, 1801
- Parupeneus chryserydros (Lacépède, 1801)
- Mullus radiatus G. Shaw, 1803
- Upeneus immaculatus E. T. Bennett, 1831
- Upeneus luteus Valenciennes, 1831
- Parupeneus luteus (Valenciennes, 1831)
- Upeneus oxycephalus Bleeker, 1856
- Upeneus chryserythrus Günther, 1873
- Parupeneus xanthospilurus Bleeker, 1875
- Mullus microps Bliss, 1883
- Upeneus saffordi Seale, 1901
- Pseudupeneus aurantiacus Seale, 1906
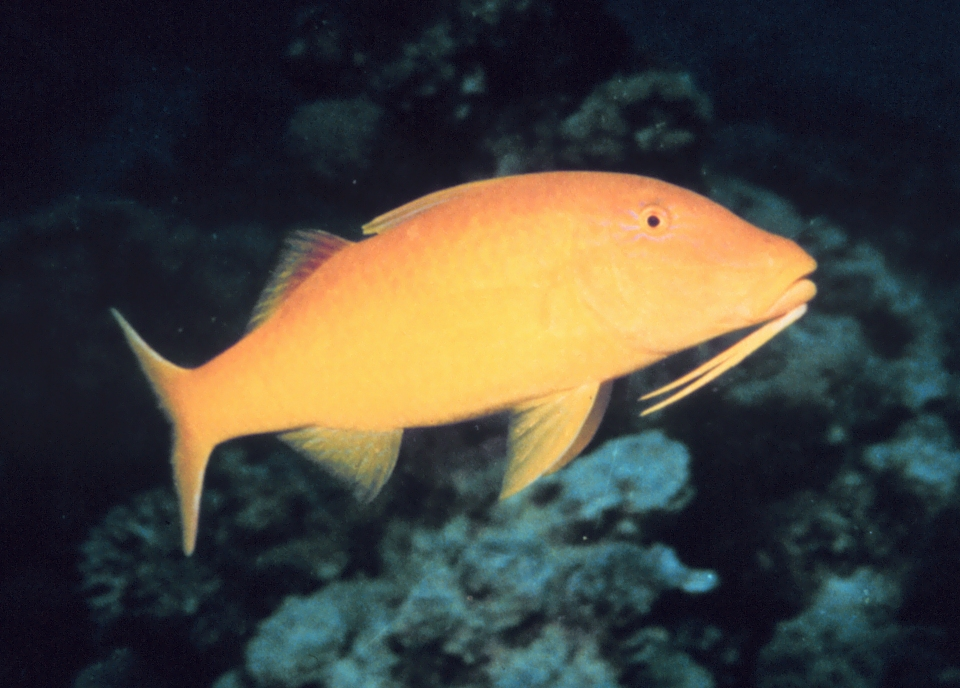
Yellow variant, Gulf of Aqaba, Red Sea
