= Parupeneus insularis =

Scientific classification
- Kingdom: Animalia
- Phylum: Chordata
- Class: Actinopterygii
- Division: Teleostei
- Order: Syngnathiformes
- Family: Mullidae
- Genus: Parupeneus
- Species: P. insularis

Binomial name
- Parupeneus insularis Randall & Myers, 2002

Species of fish

Parupeneus insularis is a species of ray-finned fish in the family Mullidae, the goatfishes, found in the Indo-Pacific Ocean.
