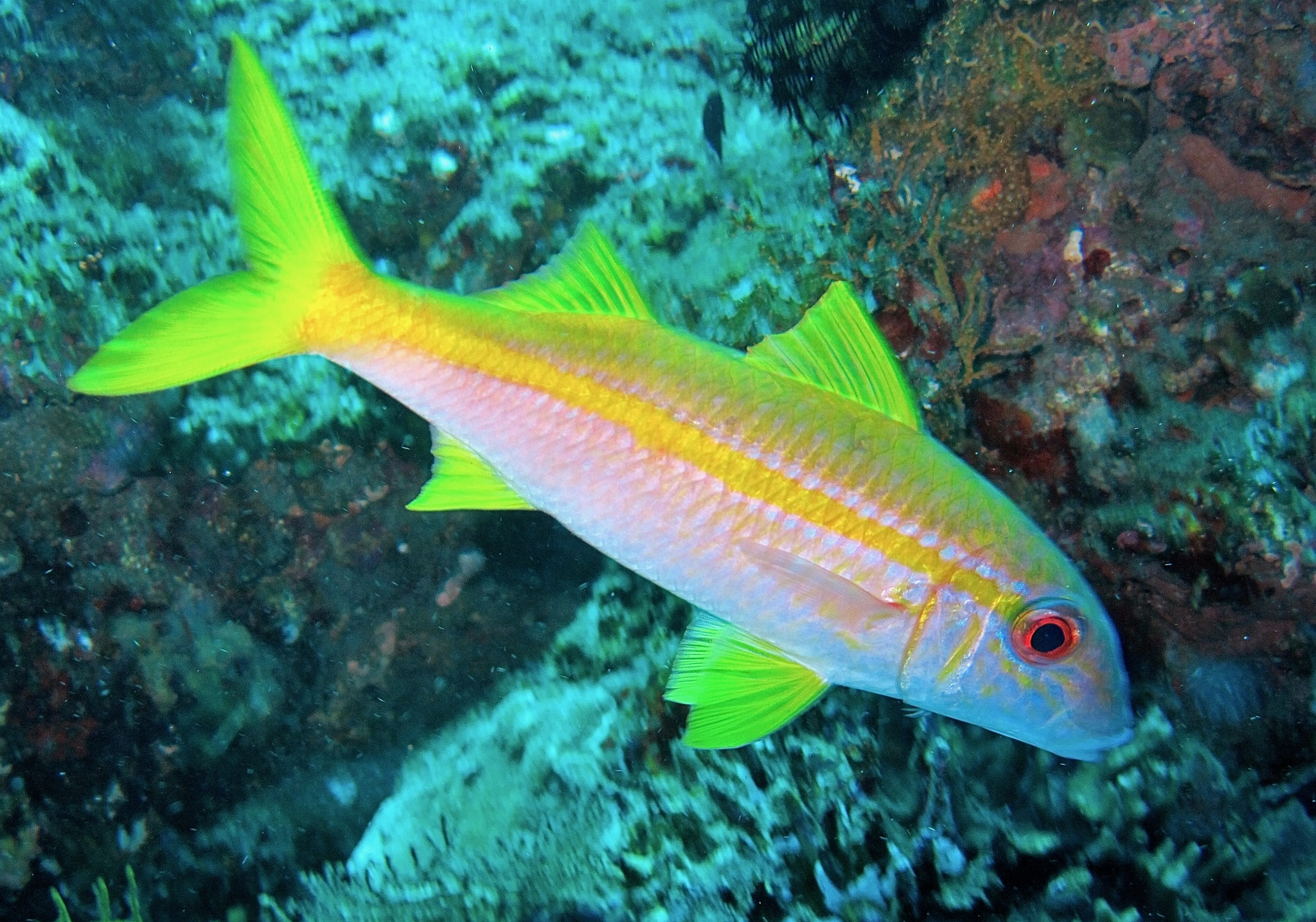
- Yellowfin goatfish

Scientific classification
- Kingdom: Animalia
- Phylum: Chordata
- Class: Actinopterygii
- Order: Syngnathiformes
- Suborder: Mulloidei
- Family: Mullidae; Rafinesque, 1815

Genera
- see text

= Goatfish =

Family of ray-finned fishes

The goatfishes, or mullets, are ray-finned fish of the family Mullidae, the only family in the suborder Mulloidei of the order Syngnathiformes. The family is also sometimes referred to as the red mullets, which also refers more narrowly to the genus Mullus.

The family name and the English common name mullet derived from Latin mullus, the red mullet; other than the red mullet and the striped red mullet or surmullet, the English word "mullet" generally refers to a different family of fish, the Mugilidae or gray mullets.

== Taxonomy ==
=== Evolution ===
Due to their relatively nondescript body plan, the phylogenetic affinities of goatfishes have long been uncertain, outside of their being percomorphs. In the past, they were placed in an expanded treatment of Perciformes, which is now known to be paraphyletic. More recent studies incorporating phylogenetics have found them to belong to the order Syngnathiformes, which also contains seahorses, pipefish, and flying gurnards. Specifically, they belong to a "benthic clade" also containing gurnards, seamoths, and dragonets, with the dragonets being their closest relatives. This divergence likely occurred during a rapid but ancient radiation of the Syngnathiformes during the Late Cretaceous, explaining both the physical differences between goatfish and other Syngnathiformes, as well as the past difficulty in determining their phylogenetic affinities.

=== Genera ===
These genera are classified as belonging to the Mullidae:

- Mulloidichthys Whitley, 1929
- Mullus Linnaeus, 1758
- Parupeneus Bleeker, 1863
- Pseudupeneus Bleeker, 1862
- Upeneichthys Bleeker, 1853
- Upeneus Cuvier, 1829

== Description ==
Goatfish are characterized by two chin barbels (or goatee), which contain chemosensory organs and are used to probe the sand or holes in the reef for food. Their bodies are deep and elongated, with forked tails and widely separated dorsal fins. The first dorsal fin has six to eight spines; the second dorsal has one spine and 8–9 soft rays, shorter than anal fin. There are one or two spines in the anal fin with five to eight soft rays. They have 24 vertebrae.

Many goatfish are brightly colored. The largest species, the dash-and-dot goatfish (Parupeneus barberinus), grows to 60 cm (24 in) in length; most species are less than half this size. Within the family are six genera and about 86 species.

== Distribution and habitat ==
Goatfish are distributed worldwide in tropical, subtropical, and temperate waters, in a range of habitats. Most species are associated with the bottom of the littoral, but some species of Upeneus can be deep; for example, the goatfish Upeneus davidaromi can be found at depths of 500 metres (1,600 ft). Tropical goatfish live in association with coral reefs. Some species, such as the freckled goatfish (Upeneus tragula), enter estuaries and rivers, although not to any great extent.

== Ecology ==
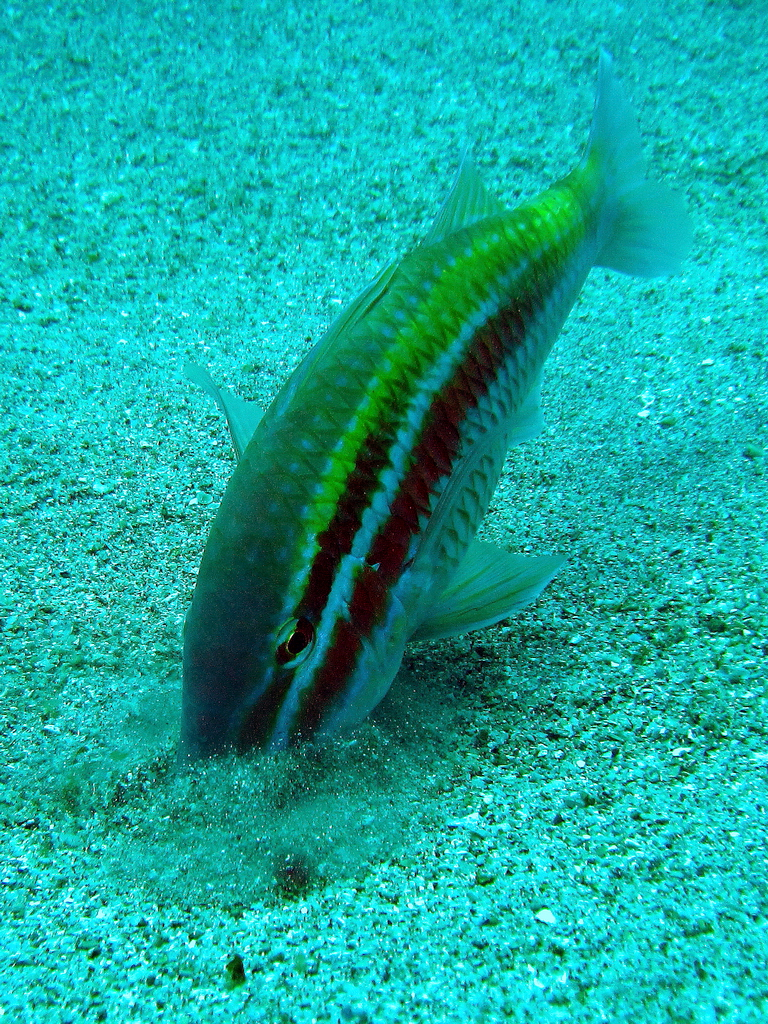
Parupeneus biaculeatus foraging for food

Goatfish are benthic feeders, using a pair of long chemosensory barbels (whiskers) protruding from their chins to feel through the sediments in search of prey. They feed on worms, crustaceans, molluscs and other small invertebrates. Other fish shadow the active goatfish, waiting patiently for any overlooked prey. For example, in Indonesia large schools of the goldsaddle goatfish (Parupeneus cyclostomus) and moray eels hunt together. This behavior is known as shadow feeding or cooperative hunting. By day, many goatfish will form large schools of inactive (nonfeeding) fish; these aggregates may contain both conspecifics and heterospecifics. For example, the yellowfin goatfish (Mulloidichthys vanicolensis) is often seen congregating with bluestripe snappers (Lutjanus kasmira). All goatfish have the ability to change their coloration depending on their current activity. One notable example, the diurnal goldsaddle goatfish (Parupeneus cyclostomus) can change from a lemon-yellow to a pale cream whilst feeding.

== Mimicry ==
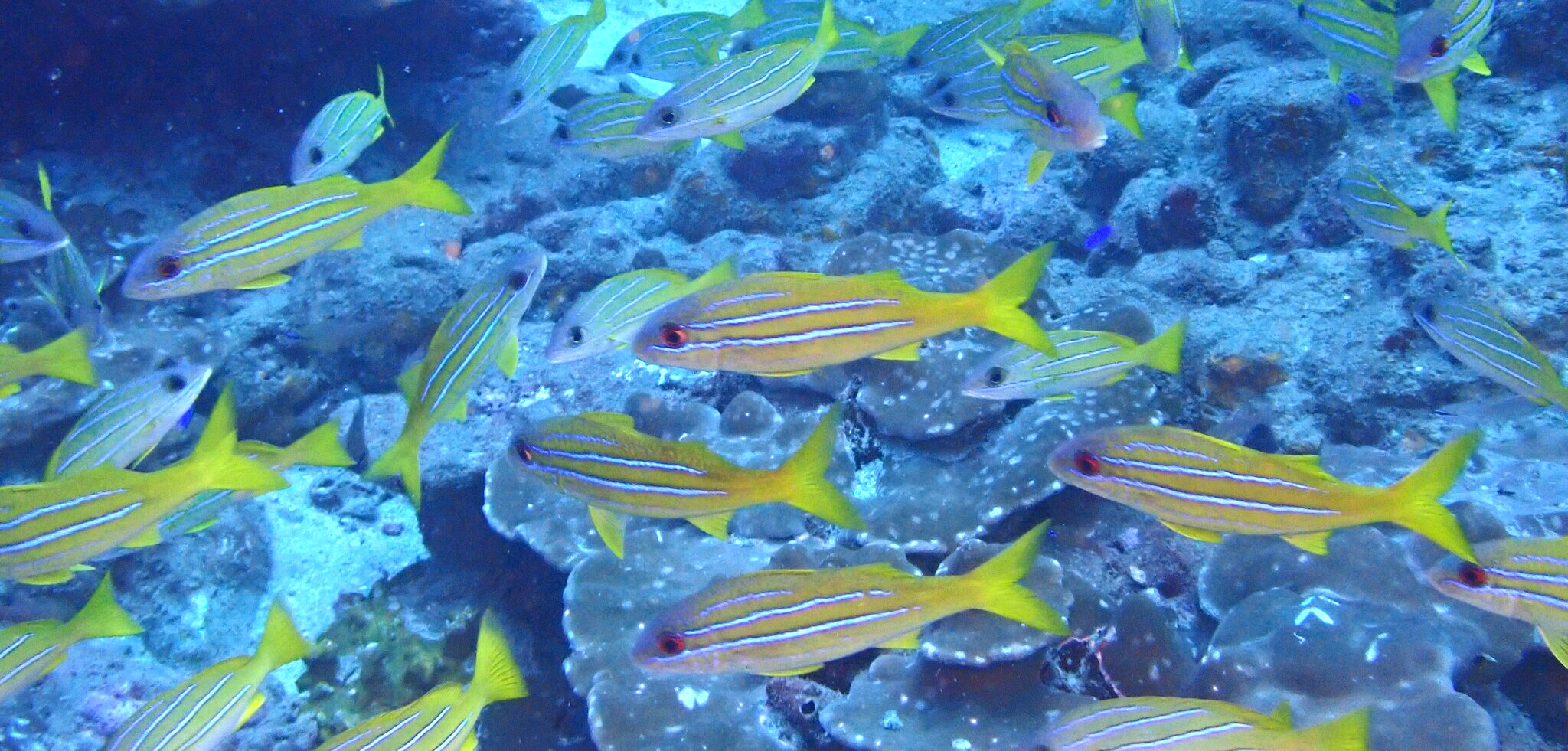
Mulloidichthys mimicus with Lutjanus kasmira

Goatfish have the ability to rapidly change color, and many species adopt a pale coloration when resting on the sand to blend with the background and become less visible to predators. These changes in color are reversible phenotypic changes and happen within seconds, many times during the lifespan of an individual.

Two species, the mimic goatfish (Mulloidichthys mimicus) and Ayliffe's goatfish (Mulloidichthys ayliffe) have evolved to mimic the blue-striped snapper (Lutjanus kasmira), with which they often form schools. These are slow, genetic changes that have occurred during their evolution over many generations.

== Reproduction and life cycle ==
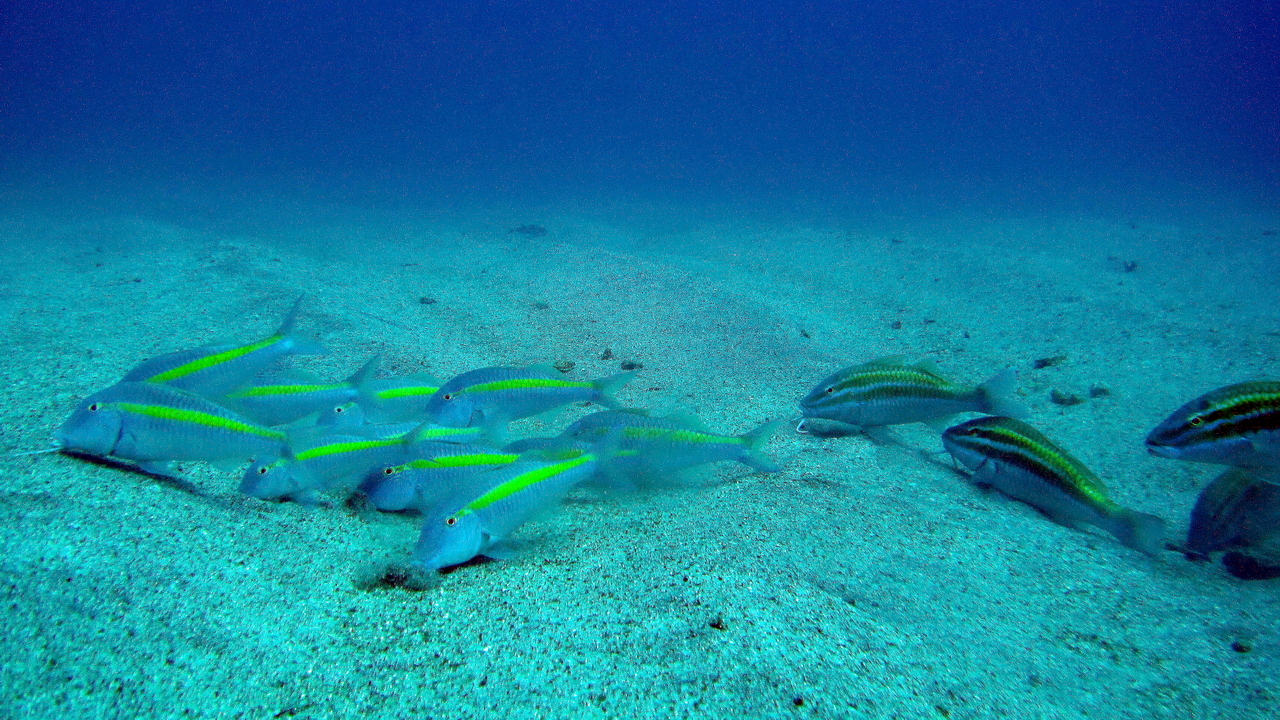
Parupeneus chrysopleuron (left) with Parupeneus biaculeatus (right)

Goatfish are pelagic spawners; they release many buoyant eggs into the water, which become part of the plankton. The eggs float freely with the currents until hatching. The larvae drift in oceanic waters or in the outer shelf for a period of 4–8 weeks until they metamorphose and develop barbels. Soon thereafter, most species take on a bottom-feeding lifestyle, although other species remain in the open water as juveniles or feed on plankton. Juvenile goatfish often prefer soft bottoms, in seagrass beds to mangroves. They change habitat preference as they develop, coinciding with changes in feeding habits, social behavior, and the formation of association with other species. Most species reach reproductive maturity after 1–2 years.

== Economic importance ==
Goatfish species are an important fishery in many areas of the world and some species are economically important. In ancient Rome until the end of the second century BCE, two species of goatfish (Mullus barbatus and Mullus surmuletus) were highly sought-after and expensive, not as a delicacy, but for aesthetic pleasure, since the fish assume a variety of colors and shades also during death. Therefore, it was paramount to serve the fish live and let them die before the eyes of the guests.

== Gallery ==
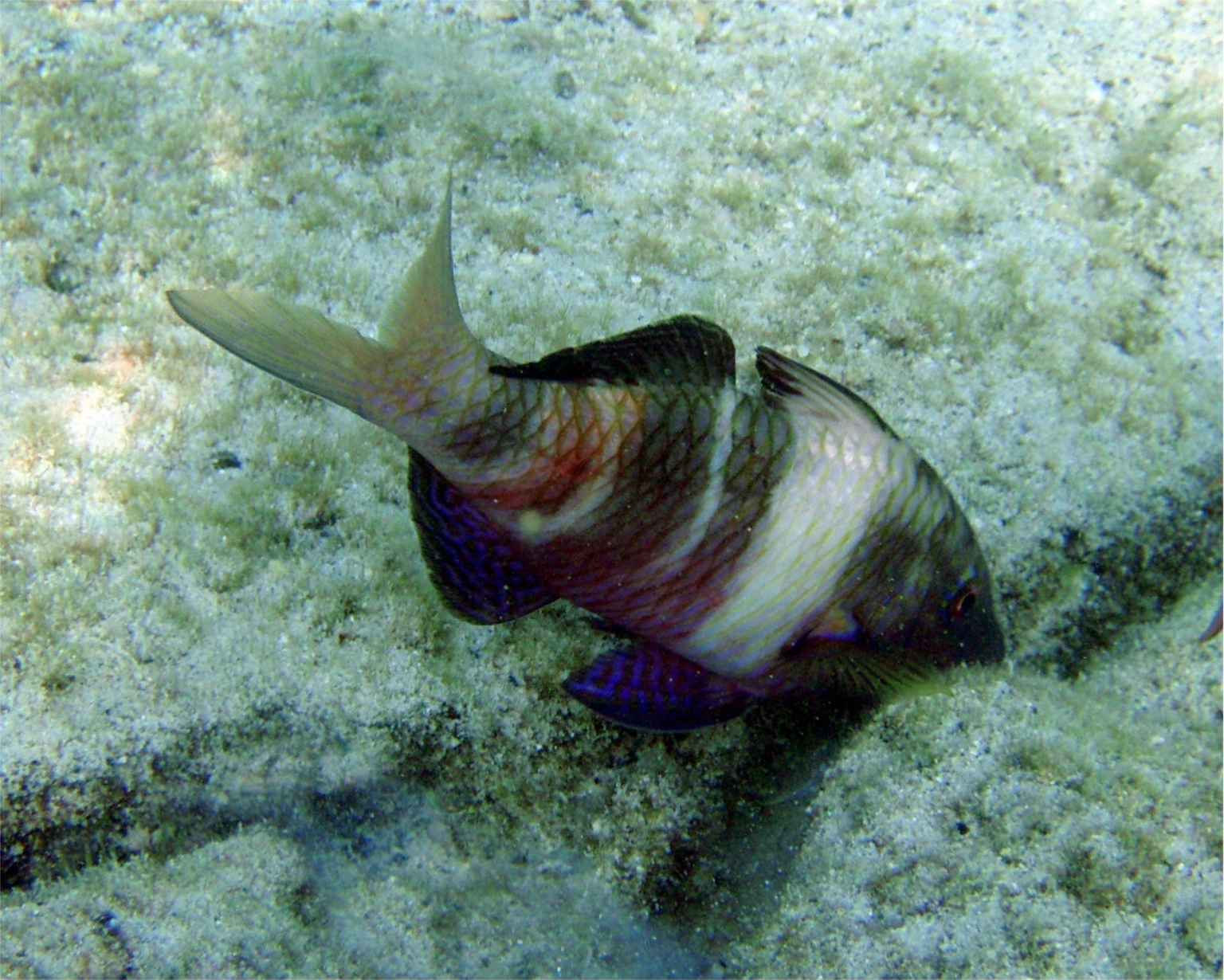
Parupeneus insularis

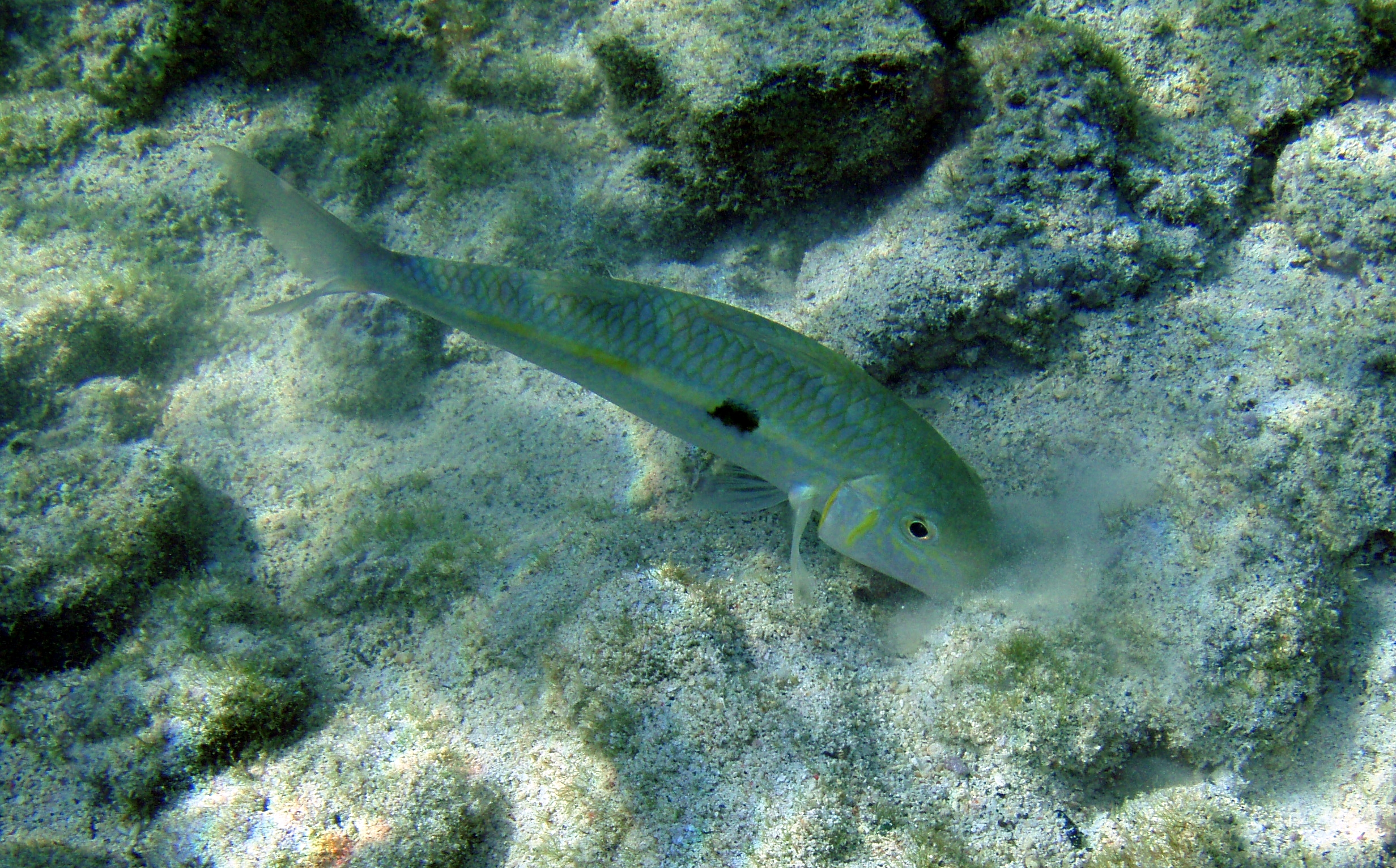
Mulloidichthys flavolineatus off the coast of Kona, Hawaii

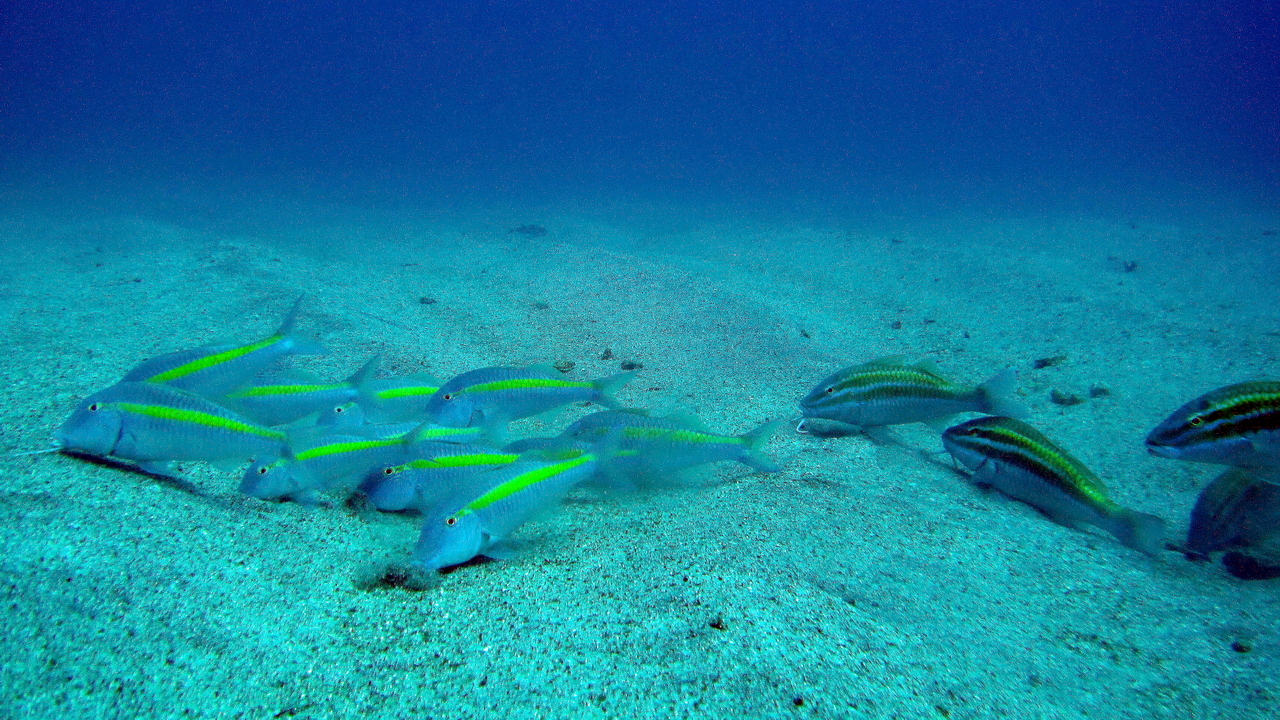
A school of yellow-striped goatfish (Parupeneus chrysopleuron) and whitesaddle goatfish (Parupeneus ciliatus) searching food on the sandy bottom, northeast coast, Taiwan

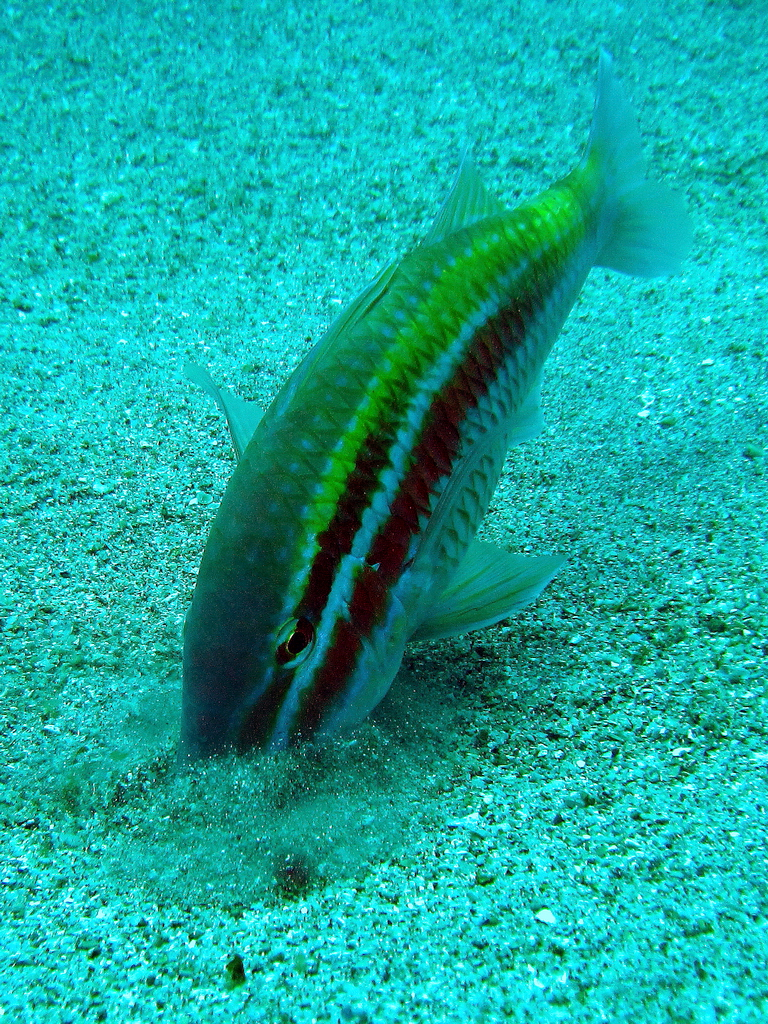
Whitesaddle goatfish (Parupeneus ciliatus) searching food by digging the sandy bottom of Long-Dong Bay, Taiwan

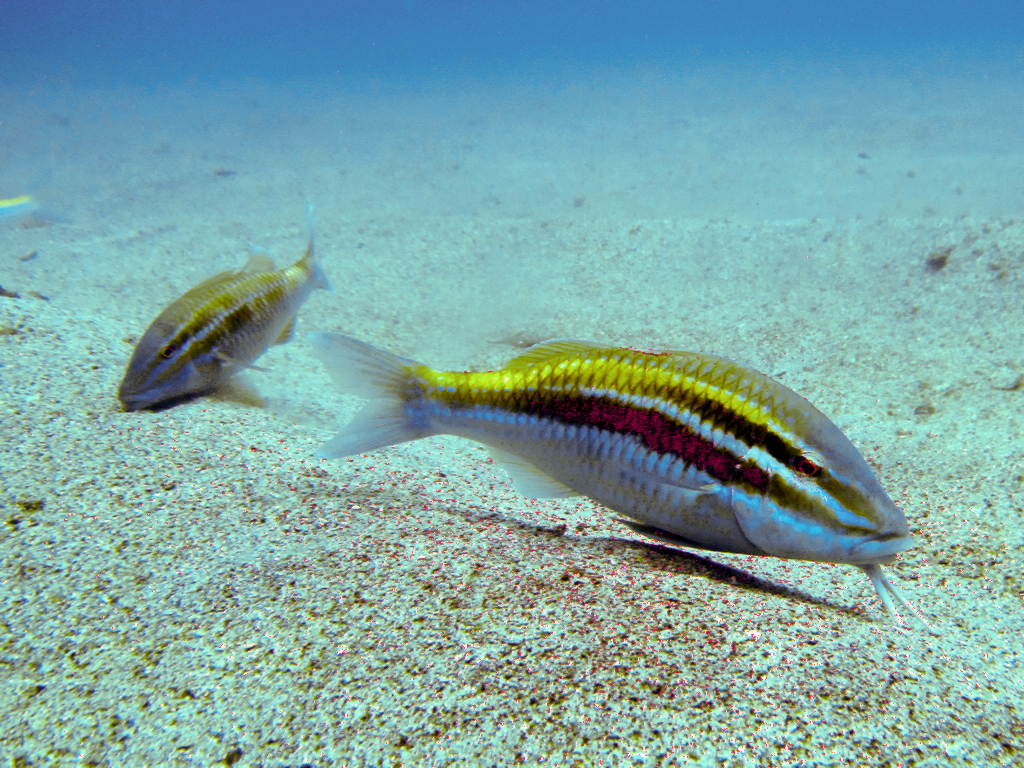
Two whitesaddle goatfish (Parupeneus ciliatus) searching food by using a pair of long chemosensory barbels on the sandy bottom of Long-Dong Bay, Taiwan
