= Sciadonus galatheae =

Conservation status
- Data Deficient (IUCN 3.1)

Scientific classification
- Kingdom: Animalia
- Phylum: Chordata
- Class: Actinopterygii
- Order: Ophidiiformes
- Family: Aphyonidae
- Genus: Sciadonus
- Species: S. galatheae

Binomial name
- Sciadonus galatheae (Nielsen, 1969)

Synonyms
- Leucochlamys galatheae Nielsen, 1969

Species of fish

Sciadonus galatheae is a species of fish in the family Aphyonidae.

== Description ==
Sciadonus galatheae is transparent or white in colour (hence the specific name, from Greek γαλάτεια, galateia, "milk-white"), with a maximum length of 9.3 cm (3.7 in). It has 88–104 dorsal fin rays and 47–58 anal fin rays. It has 48 precaudal vertebrae.

== Habitat ==
Sciadonus galatheae is abyssopelagic and bathypelagic, living at depths of up to 1,785–5,440 m (5,856–17,848 ft). It has been found in the Celtic Sea, the Solomon Sea and in the waters off New Zealand.

== Behaviour ==
Sciadonus galatheae reproduces viviparously.
