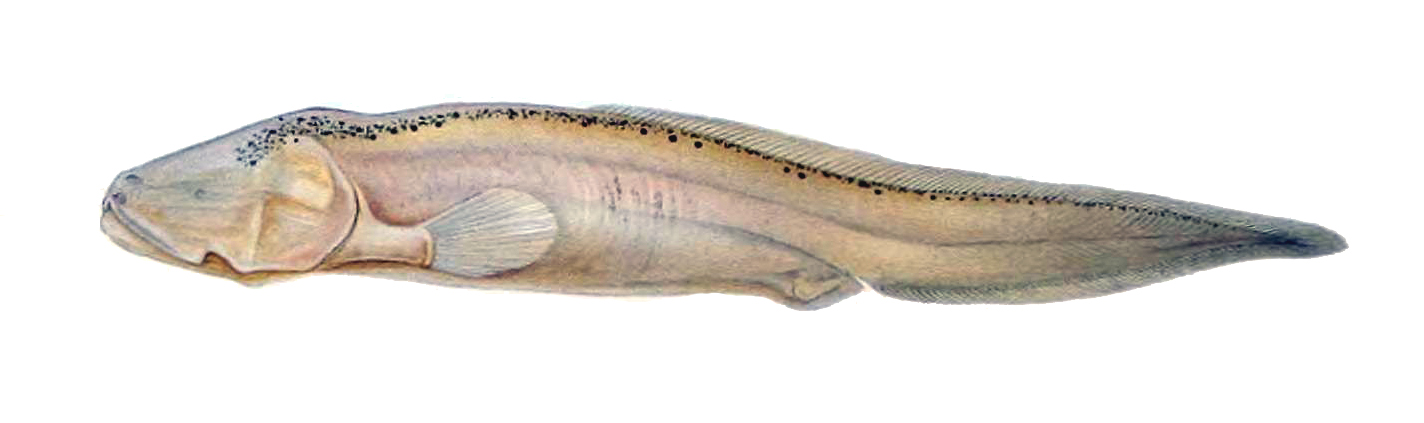
- S. cryptophthalmus

Scientific classification
- Kingdom: Animalia
- Phylum: Chordata
- Class: Actinopterygii
- Order: Ophidiiformes
- Family: Aphyonidae
- Genus: Sciadonus; Garman, 1899

Type species
- Sciadonus pedicellaris Garman, 1899

Synonyms
- Leucochlamys Zugmayer, 1911

= Sciadonus =

Genus of fishes

Sciadonus is a genus of blind cusk eels.

The generic name is derived from Greek σκίαινα (skíaina, “sea-fish, red mullet") and ὄνος (onos, "hake").

== Species ==
There are currently four recognized species in this genus:

- Sciadonus cryptophthalmus (Zugmayer, 1911)
- Sciadonus galatheae (J. G. Nielsen, 1969)
- Sciadonus jonassoni (Nybelin, 1957)
- Sciadonus pedicellaris Garman, 1899
