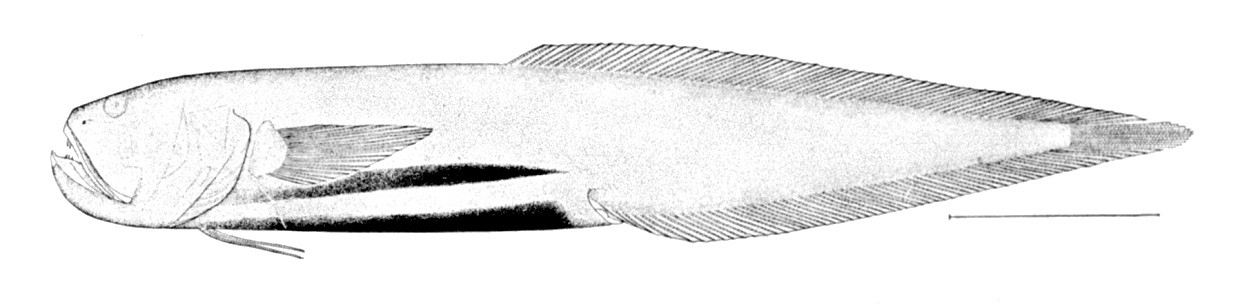
- Barathronus bicolor
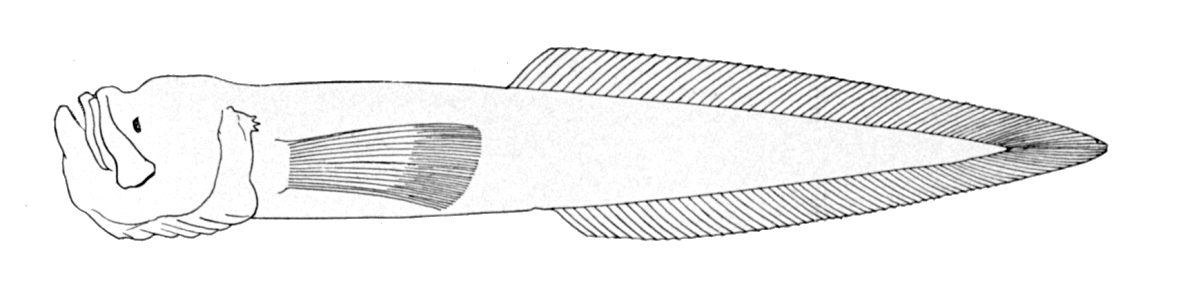
- Barathronus parfaiti

Scientific classification
- Kingdom: Animalia
- Phylum: Chordata
- Class: Actinopterygii
- Order: Ophidiiformes
- Family: Aphyonidae
- Genus: Barathronus; Goode & T. H. Bean, 1886

Type species
- Barathronus bicolor Goode & Bean, 1886

Synonyms
- Alexeterion Vaillant 1888

= Barathronus =

Genus of fishes

Barathronus is a genus of deep-sea fish that are placed in the family Aphyonidae (blind cusk eels) or family Bythitidae (brotulas), depending on the source.

== Life cycle ==
Barathronus are viviparous deep-sea fish. However, a juvenile Barathronus pacificus has been recorded in shallow waters. Based on the stable oxygen isotope composition of otoliths, at least one species, Barathronus maculatus, has a pelagic larval stage, followed by an ontogenetic vertical migration to deeper waters.

== Species ==
There are currently 10 recognized species in this genus, although the exact species differ between the FishBase and the Catalog of Fishes:

- Barathronus affinis A. B. Brauer, 1906
- Barathronus bicolor Goode & T. H. Bean, 1886
- Barathronus bruuni J. G. Nielsen, 1969
- Barathronus diaphanus A. B. Brauer, 1906
- Barathronus linsi J. G. Nielsen, Mincarone & di Dario, 2015 — not listed in the FishBase
- Barathronus maculatus Shcherbachev, 1976 (Spotted gelatinous cusk)
- Barathronus multidens J. G. Nielsen, 1984
- Barathronus pacificus J. G. Nielsen & Eagle, 1974
- Barathronus parfaiti (Vaillant, 1888)
- Barathronus roulei J. G. Nielsen, 2019
- Barathronus solomonensis J. G. Nielsen & Møller, 2008 — recognized as Paraphyonus solomonensis in the Catalog of Fishes
- Barathronus unicolor J. G. Nielsen, 1984
