= Ponticus =

Ponticus (from Ancient Greek Ποντικός Pontikós, lit. 'of Pontus, Pontic') may refer to:

- Heraclides Ponticus (c. 390 – c. 310 BCE), a philosopher and astronomer from Heraclea Pontica
- Aquila Ponticus (fl. 130 CE), a translator of the Hebrew Bible into Greek
- Ponticus (saint), a minor 2nd-century Christian saint
- Evagrius Ponticus (345–399 CE), a Christian monk from Heraclea Pontica

== See also ==
- Delphinus delphis ponticus
- Lemonia ponticus
- Mullus barbatus ponticus
- Nabis ponticus
- Nesticus ponticus
- Pagurus ponticus
- Petrobius ponticus
- Pholcus ponticus
- Rhodacarus ponticus
- Tabanus ponticus
- Tursiops truncatus ponticus
- Vibrio ponticus
- Pontica
