= Blandina =

2nd century Gallic Christian martyr

Saint Blandina
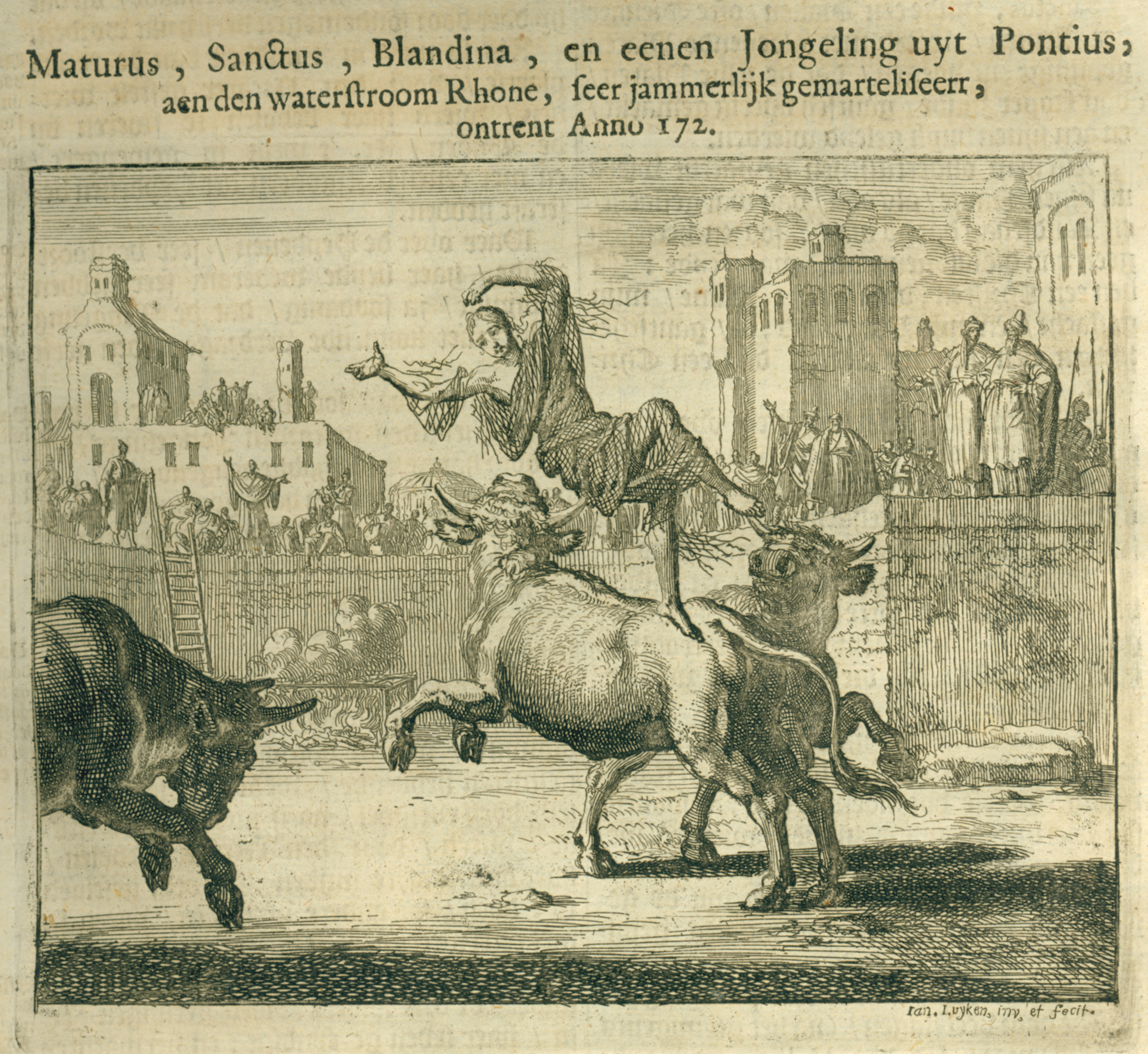
- Blandina severely burned and thrown to wild bulls

Virgin and martyr
- Born: c. 162 AD; Lugdunum, Roman Empire (modern Lyon, France)
- Died: 177 AD (aged around 15); Lugdunum, Roman Empire
- Venerated in: Catholic Church, Eastern Orthodox Church, Eastern Catholic Churches, Anglican Communion, Oriental Orthodoxy
- Feast: 2 June
- Attributes: A bull, depicted tied to a pillar with a lion and bear near her

Saint Blandina (French: Blandine, c. 162–177 AD) was a Christian martyr who died in Lugdunum (modern Lyon, France) during the reign of Emperor Marcus Aurelius.

== Context ==
In the first two centuries of the Christian era, it was the local Roman officials who were largely responsible for the persecution of Christians. In the second century, the emperors treated Christianity as a local problem to be dealt with by their subordinates. The number and severity of persecutions of Christians in various locations of the empire seemingly increased during the reign of Marcus Aurelius. The extent to which Marcus Aurelius himself directed, encouraged, or was aware of these persecutions is unclear and much debated by historians.

== Traditional history ==
The traditional account regarding Blandina is reported by Eusebius in his Historia Ecclesiastica.

Blandina belonged to the band of martyrs of Lyon who, after some of their number had endured frightful tortures, suffered martyrdom in 177 in the reign of Marcus Aurelius. Almost all we know of Blandina comes from a letter sent from the Church of Lyon to the Churches of Asia Minor. Eusebius gives significant space for her life and death in his book as he quotes from the aforementioned epistle to Asia Minor. The Roman populace in Lyon had been excited against the Christians so that the latter, when they ventured to show themselves publicly, were harassed and ill-treated.

While the imperial legate was away, the chiliarch, a military commander, and the duumvir, a civil magistrate, threw a number of Christians, who confessed their faith, into prison. When the legate returned, the imprisoned believers were brought to trial. Among these Christians was Blandina, a slave, who had been taken into custody along with her master, also a Christian. Her companions greatly feared that on account of her bodily frailty she might not remain steadfast under torture. But although the legate caused her to be tortured in a horrible manner, so that even the executioners became exhausted "as they did not know what more they could do to her", still she remained faithful and repeated to every question "I am a Christian, and we commit no wrongdoing."

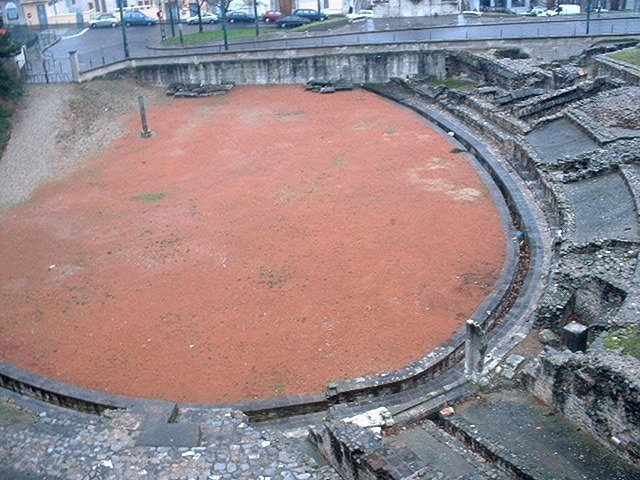
Amphithéâtre des Trois-Gaules, in Lyon. The pole in the arena is a memorial to the martyrs, including Blandina.

Due to fear of being tortured, slaves had testified against their masters that the Christians committed cannibalism and incest when assembled, which was a common rumor about Christians during this and later centuries. The legate desired to wring confession of this misconduct from the Christian prisoners. According to Eusebius, the legate stated in his report to the emperor that those who held to their Christian belief were to be executed and those who denied their faith were to be released, and the legate received instructions from the Emperor Marcus Aurelius allowing the Roman citizens who persisted in the faith to be executed by beheading, but those without citizenship were to be tortured. Blandina was therefore subjected to new tortures with a number of companions in the town's amphitheater (now known as the Amphitheatre of the Three Gauls) at the time of the public games. One such companion was Ponticus, a 15-year-old boy and the youngest of the martyrs, who was encouraged by Blandina to have faith in Christ which gave Ponticus the strength to continue.

She was bound to a stake, mirroring the image of a cross, and wild beasts were set on her. While being restrained on the stake, Blandina began to pray passionately for both her companions and her captors. According to legend, the beasts never touched her and she was removed from the stake and thrown back in jail. After enduring this for a number of days, in an effort to persuade her to recant, she was led into the arena to see the sufferings of her companions. Finally, as the last of the martyrs, she was scourged, placed on a red-hot grate, enclosed in a net and thrown before a wild steer, which tossed her into the air with his horns. In the end, she was killed with a dagger.

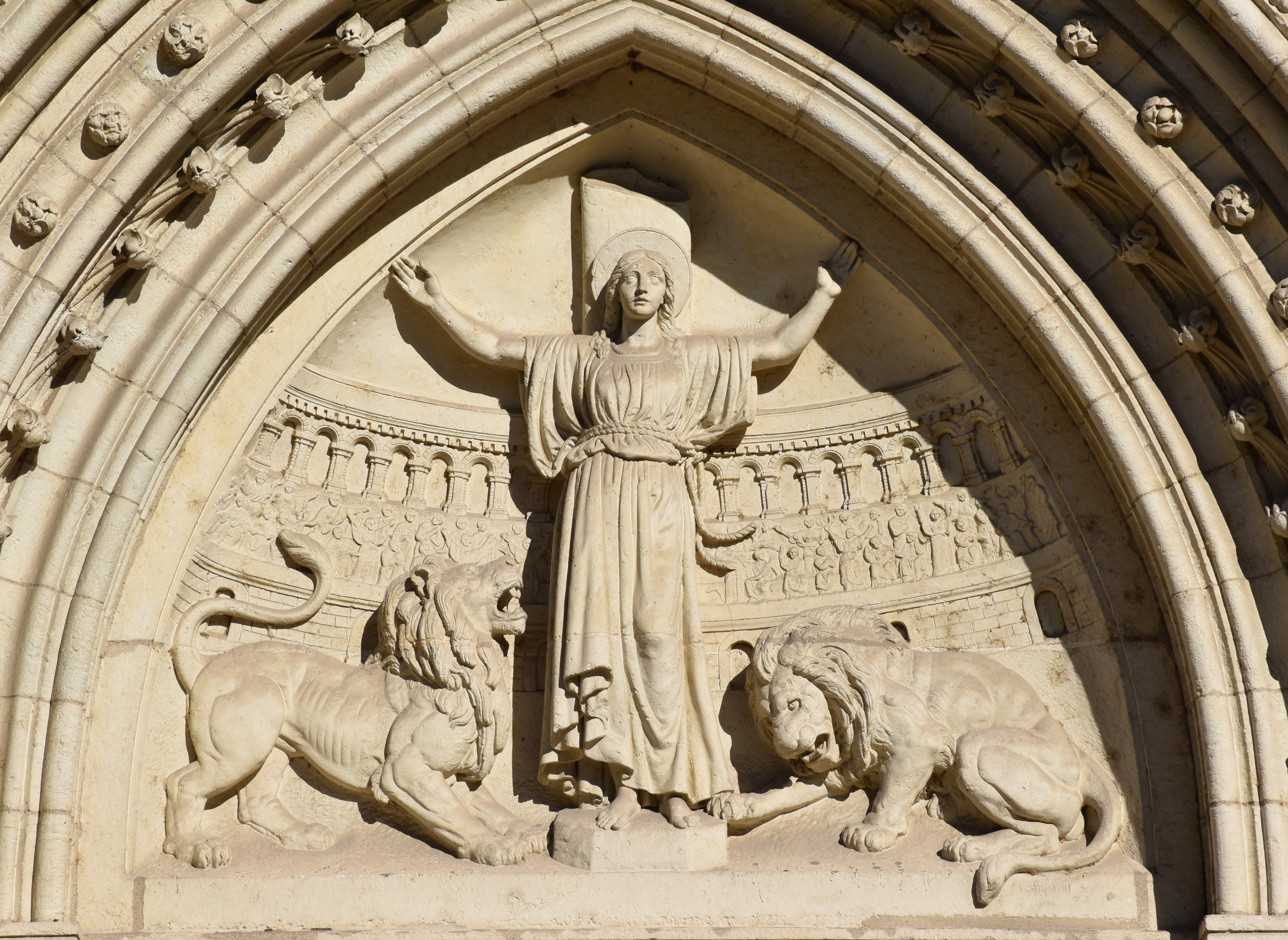
Jules Comparat,The Martyrdom of Saint Blandina (1886), typanum of the Church of Saint-Blandine de Lyon, Lyon

== Significance ==
Of all the martyrs of Lyon, Blandina is the only female to receive attention throughout the narrative and appears significant through her representations as a mother and an athlete. Blandina also holds significance through her allusions to Christ.

Throughout the story of the martyrs of Lyon, Blandina is portrayed as mother who sends her children to become martyrs for God before becoming a martyr herself, "Blandina herself passed through all the ordeals of her children." Blandina's relationship to the youngest of the martyrs, Ponticus, is also compared to the mother in 4 Maccabees. Through these sections Blandina is given a maternal role and serves as one example of motherhood for other Christian women to look to.

Blandina, as with many early Christian martyrs, is also represented as an athlete for Christ. Athletes in this sense were Christians who were willing to "compete" through martyrdom and die for Christ. Despite being referred to as frail, small, and weak, Blandina is able to endure a full day's worth of torture and outlasts her tortures. Blandina prevails once more against her persecutors within the town's amphitheater as she prays for herself and her companions, posed as though she were being crucified. Blandina's companions witness this, see Christ within her, and get inspired as she takes on the "crooked serpent." Blandina is able to defeat her adversaries time and time again because she clothed herself in Christ and, "won the crown of immortality."

== Legacy ==
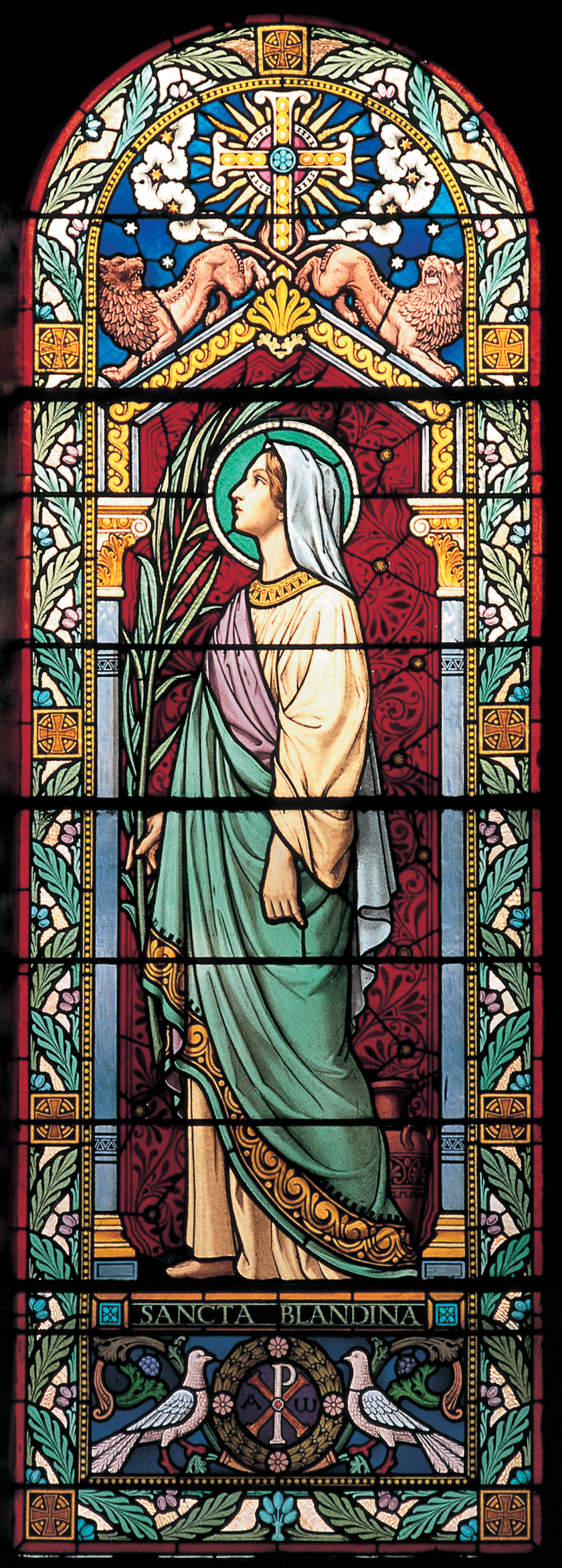
Blandine in St Irenaus Church, Lyon.

- Her feast is celebrated on June 2.
- Two communes in France are named after her. See Sainte-Blandine.
- The amphitheater in Lyon has a plaque that details the story of the martyrs and Blandina is the only martyr mentioned by name.
- The troubled teenage protagonist of Tess Gunty's award-winning novel The Rabbit Hutch renames herself Blandine after reading about the saint, and gives a two-page account of her martyrdom.

== See also ==
- Persecution in Lyon
- Scillitan Martyrs
- Acts of the Martyrs
- List of Christian women of the patristic age
