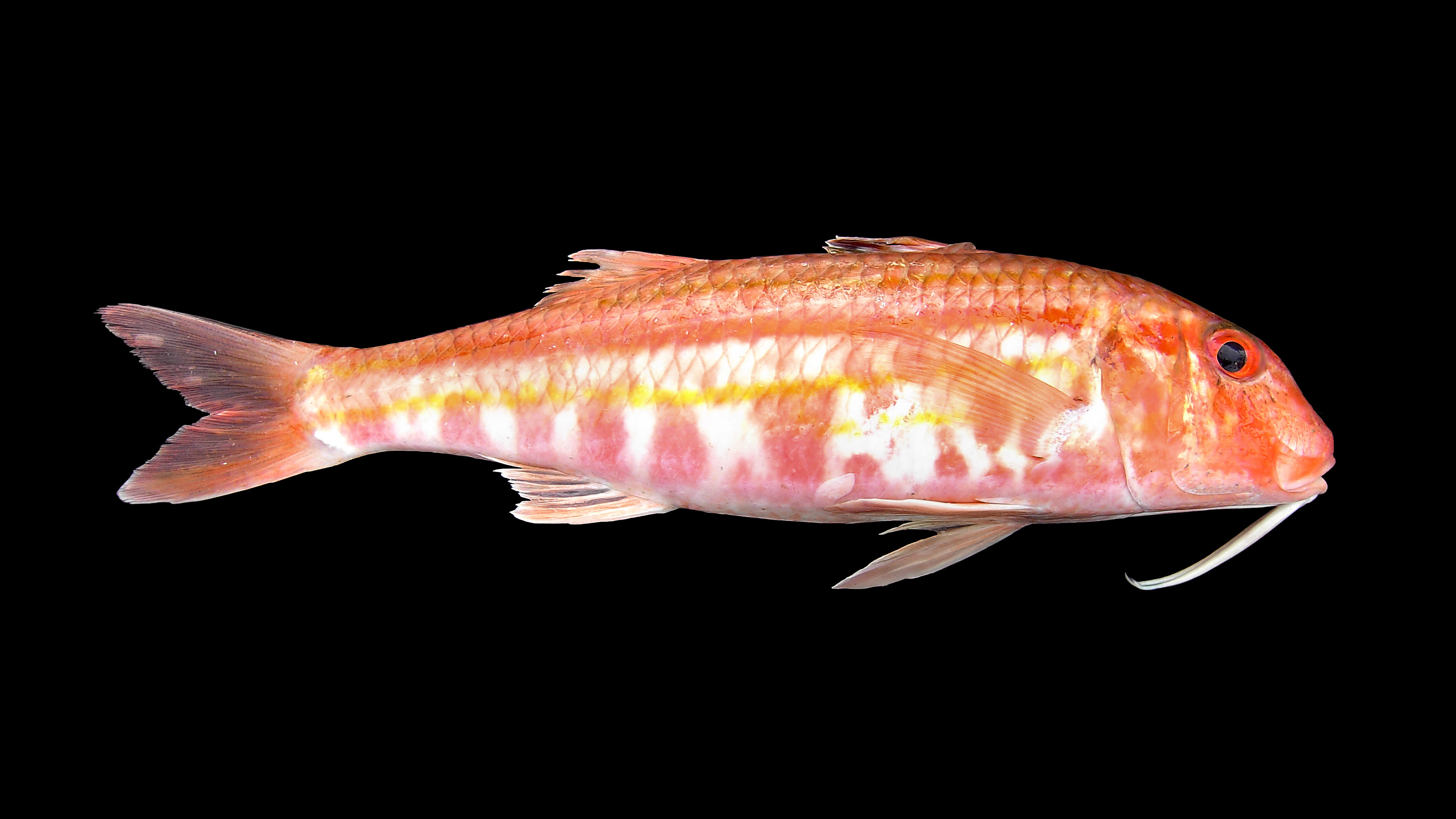
- Red mullet from the Southern North Sea.

Conservation status
- Least Concern (IUCN 3.1)

Scientific classification
- Kingdom: Animalia
- Phylum: Chordata
- Class: Actinopterygii
- Division: Teleostei
- Order: Syngnathiformes
- Family: Mullidae
- Genus: Mullus
- Species: M. surmuletus

Binomial name
- Mullus surmuletus Linnaeus, 1758

Synonyms
- Mullus barbatus surmuletus Linnaeus, 1758; Mullus fuscatus Rafinesque, 1810

= Striped red mullet =

Species of ray-finned fish

The striped red mullet or surmullet (Mullus surmuletus) is a species of goatfish found in the Mediterranean Sea, eastern North Atlantic Ocean, and the Black Sea. They can be found in water as shallow as 5 metres (16 ft) or as deep as 409 metres (1,342 ft) depending upon the portion of their range that they are in. This species can reach a length of 40 centimetres (16 in) SL though most are only around 25 centimetres (9.8 in). The greatest recorded weight for this species is 1 kilogram (2.2 lb). This is a commercially important species and is also sought after as a game fish.

== Etymology ==
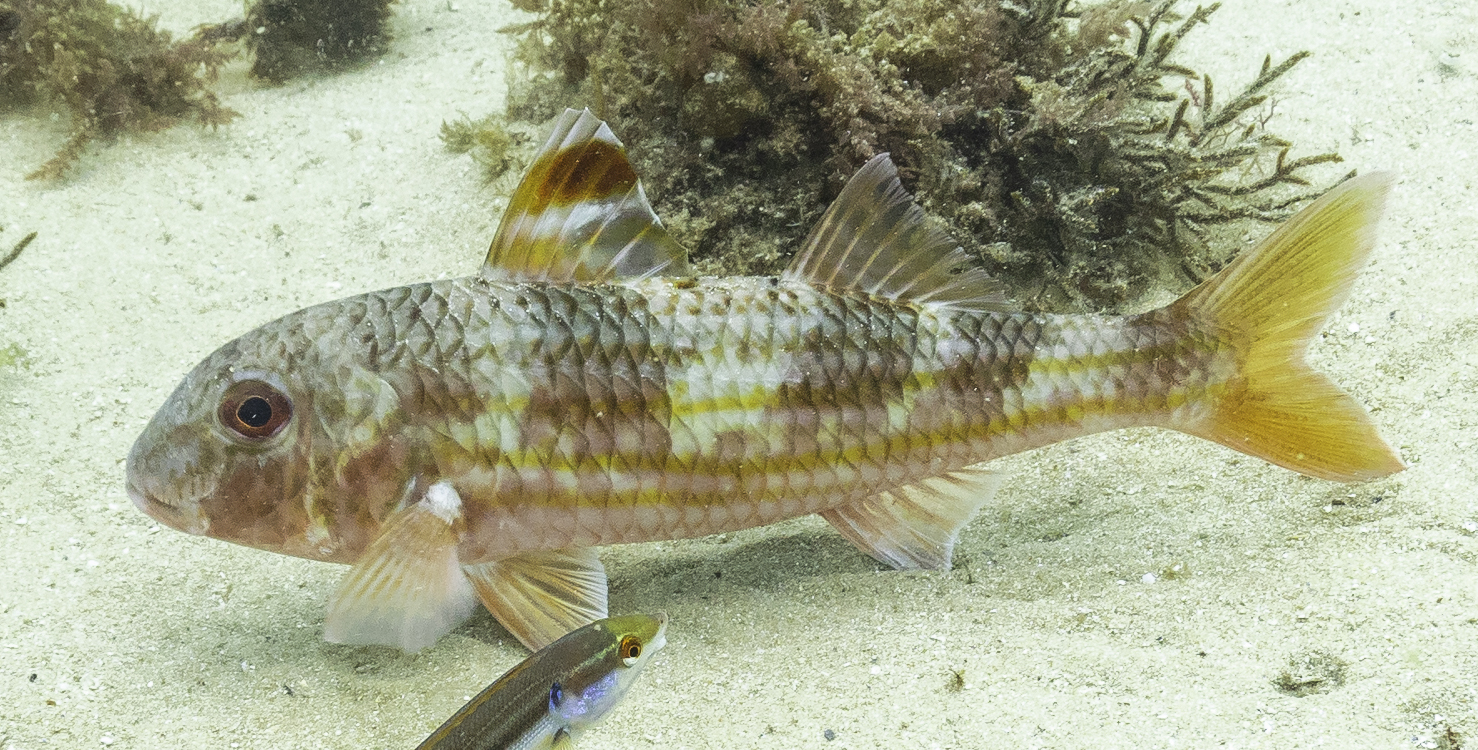
Showing the striped dorsal fin, Portugal

Mullus barbatus and it are commonly called "red mullets" and often are not distinguished, though they can be told apart by the striped first dorsal fin of M. surmuletus.

Despite its English name, the striped red mullet, of the goatfish family Mullidae, is only very distantly related to the grey mullet and other species called "mullet", classified in their own separate order and family.

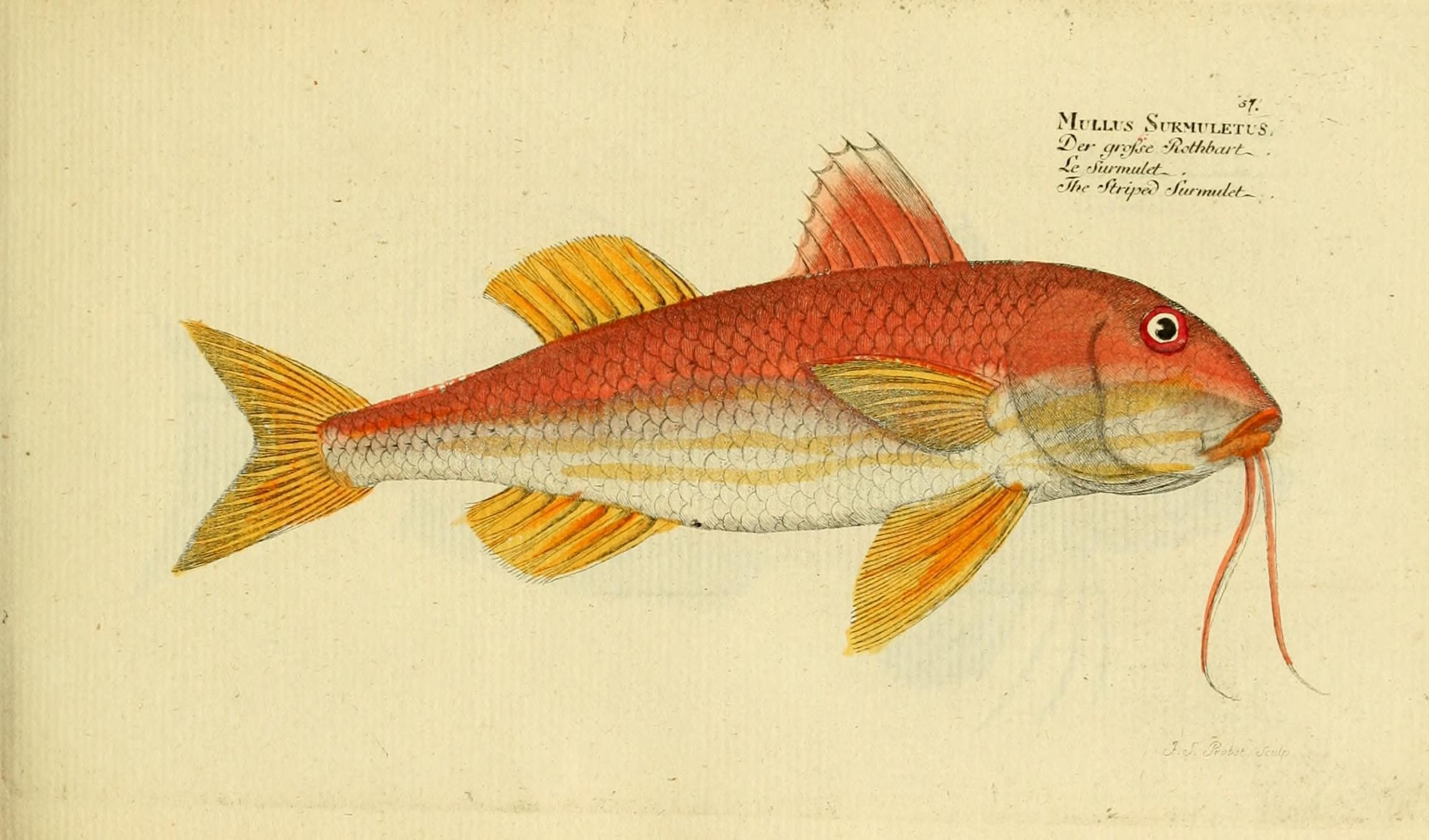
1796 illustration of Mullus surmuletus

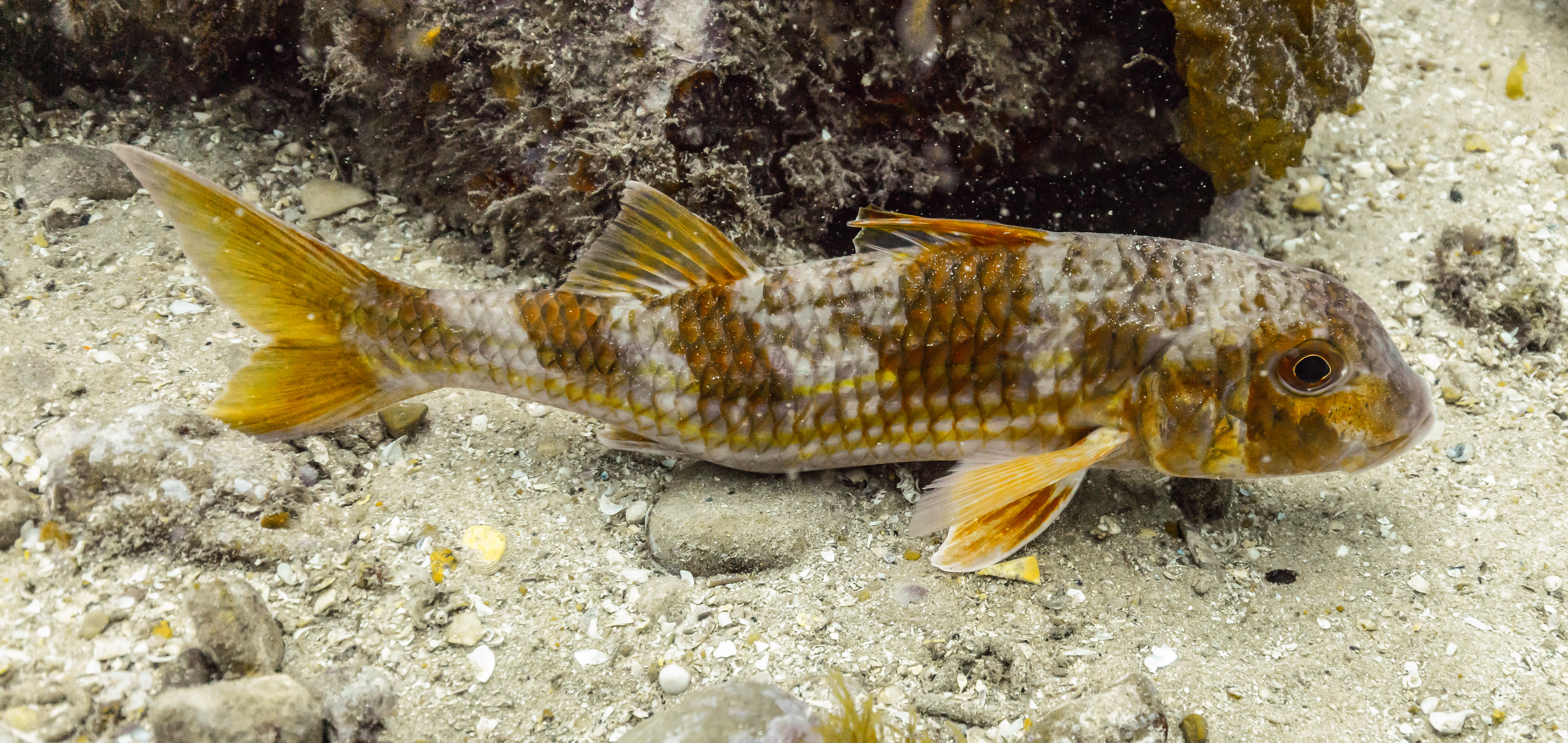
In Portugal

== Gallery ==
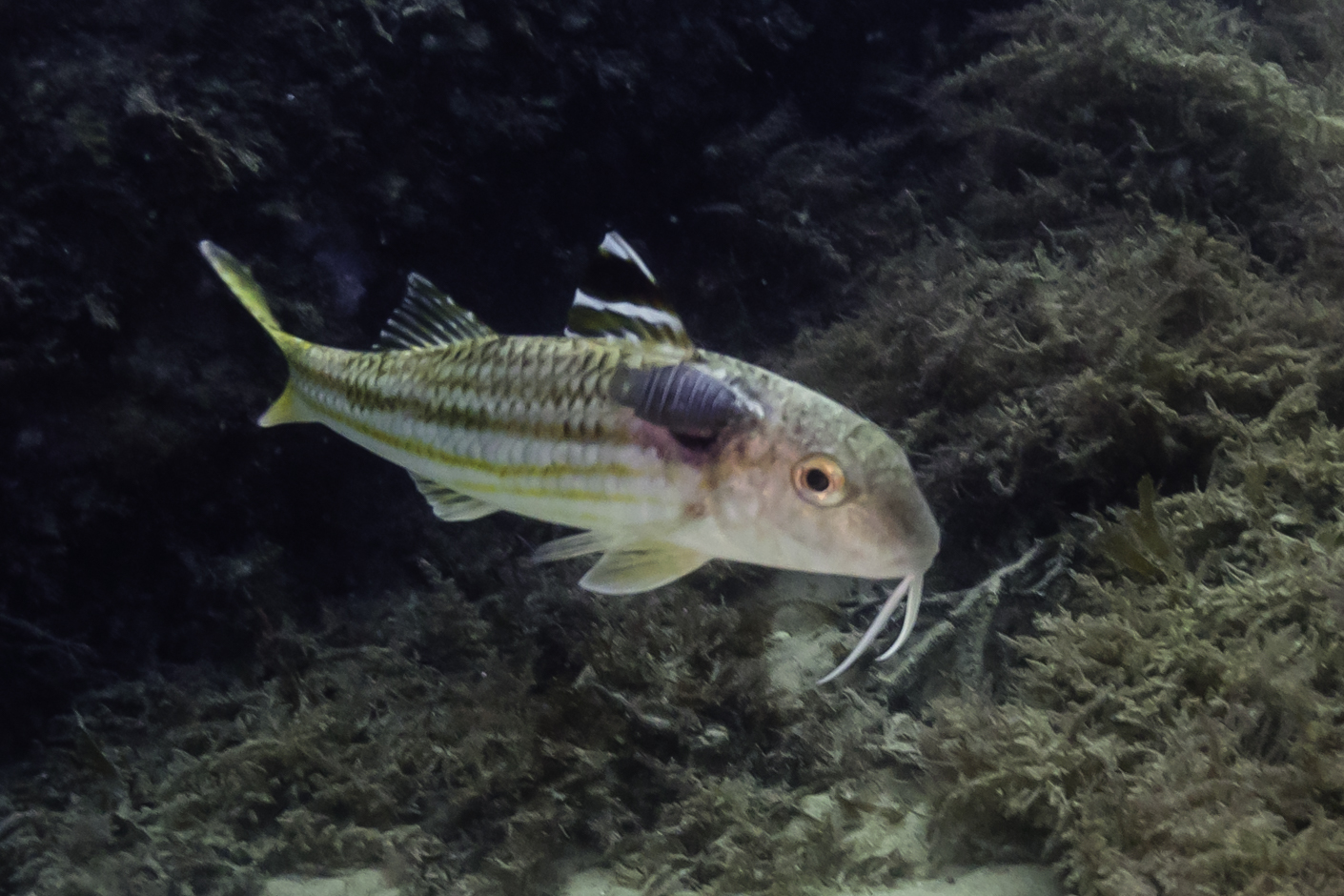
With Anilocra physodes parasite, Portugal

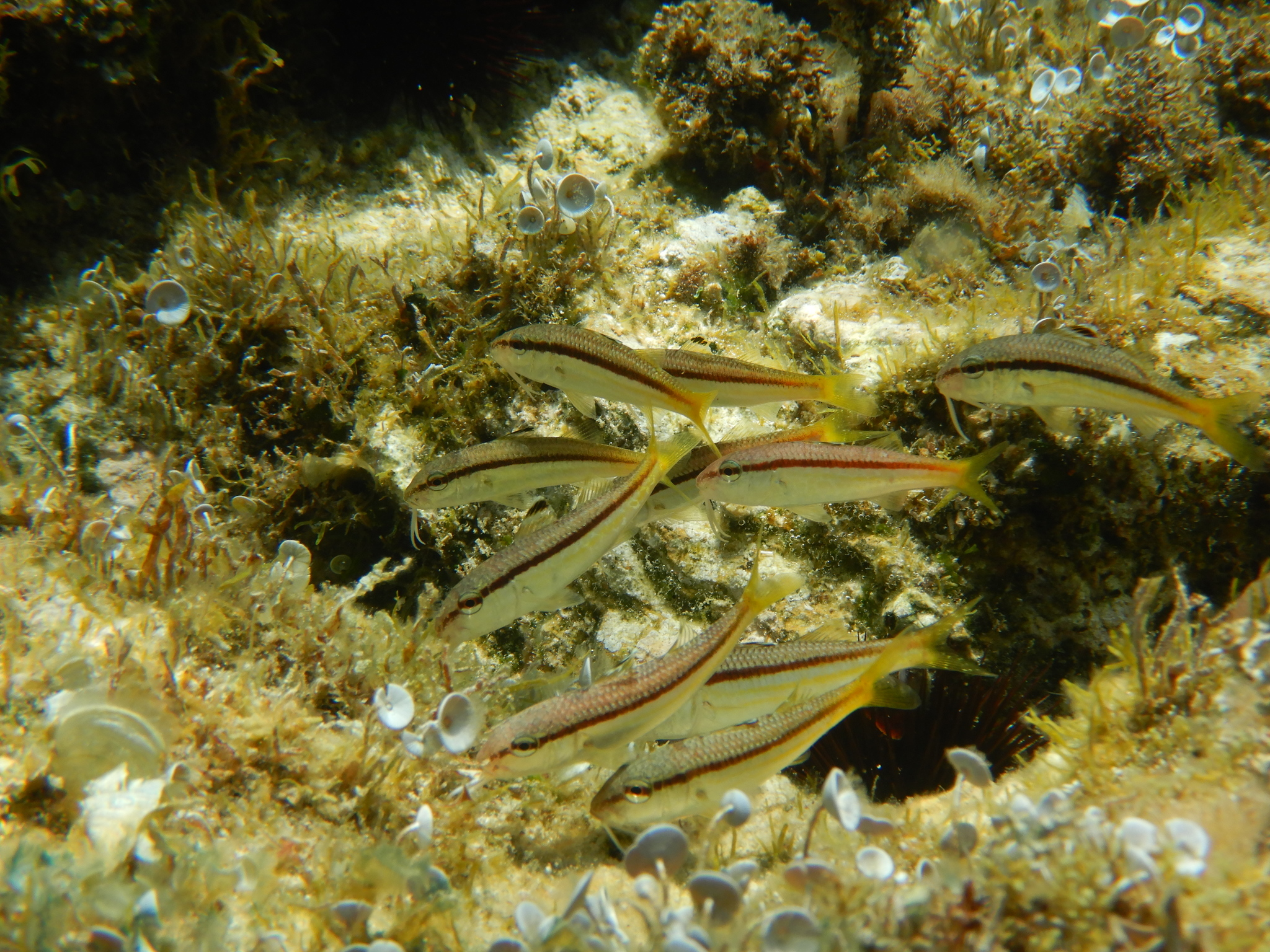
Greece

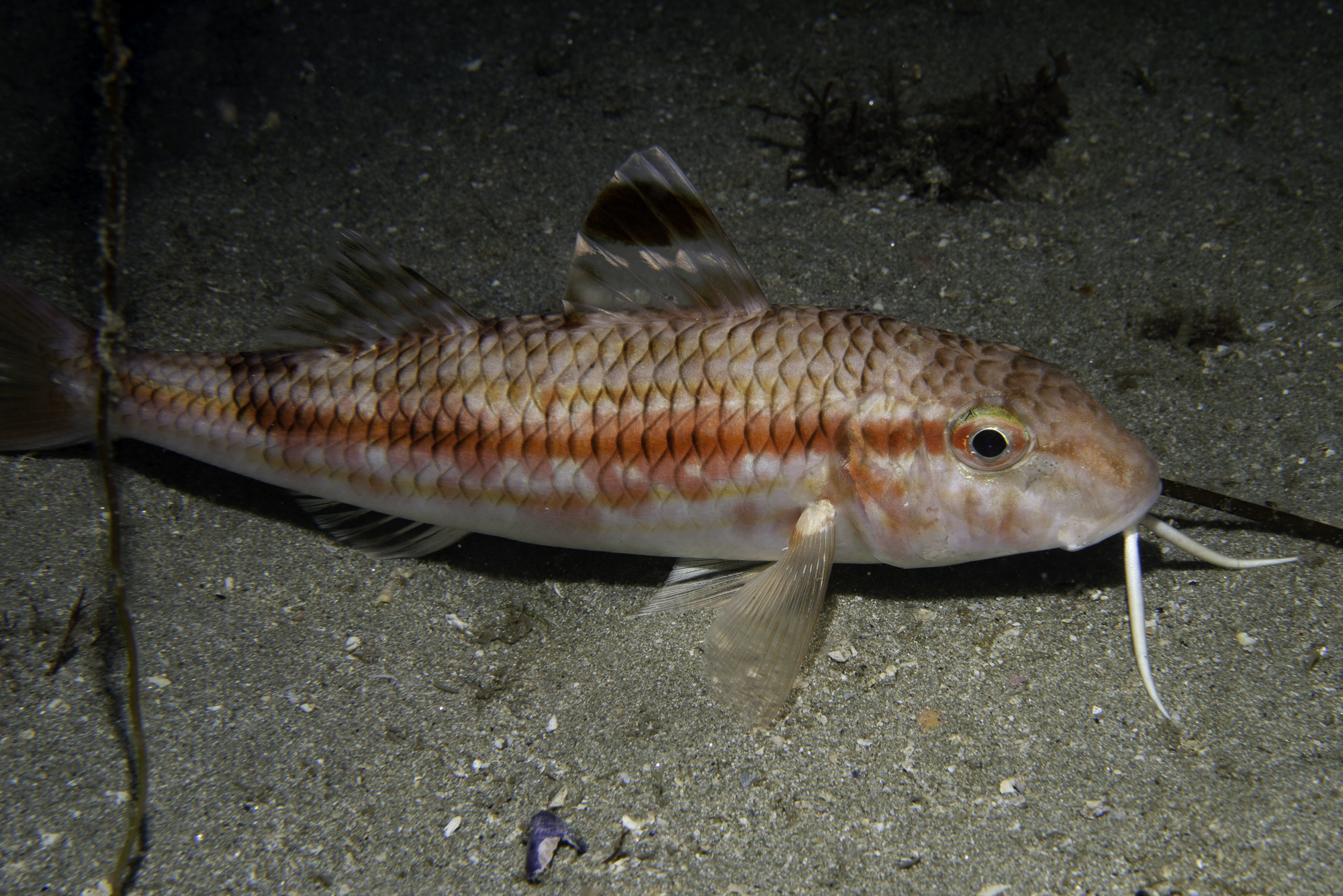
Ireland

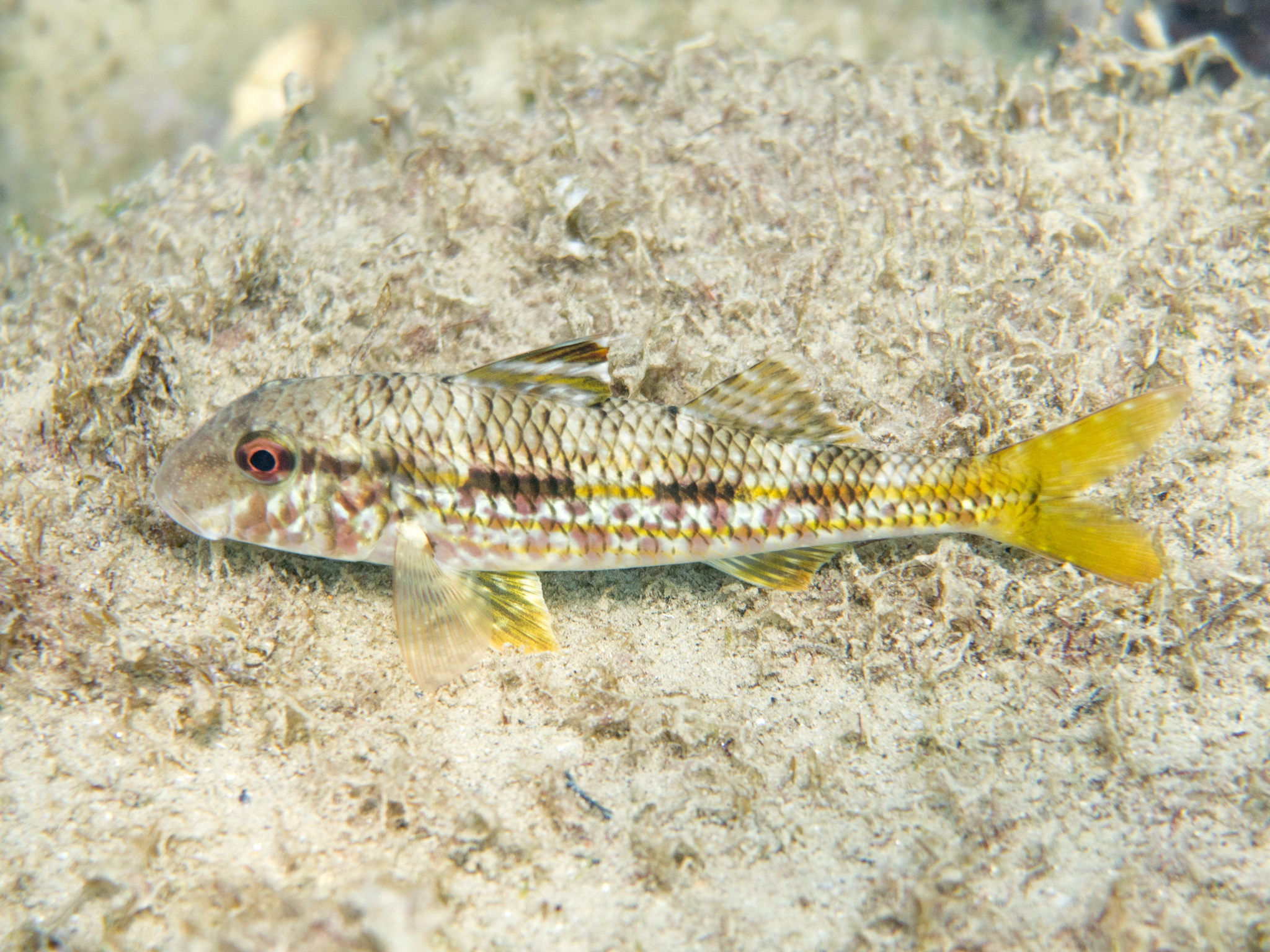
Italy

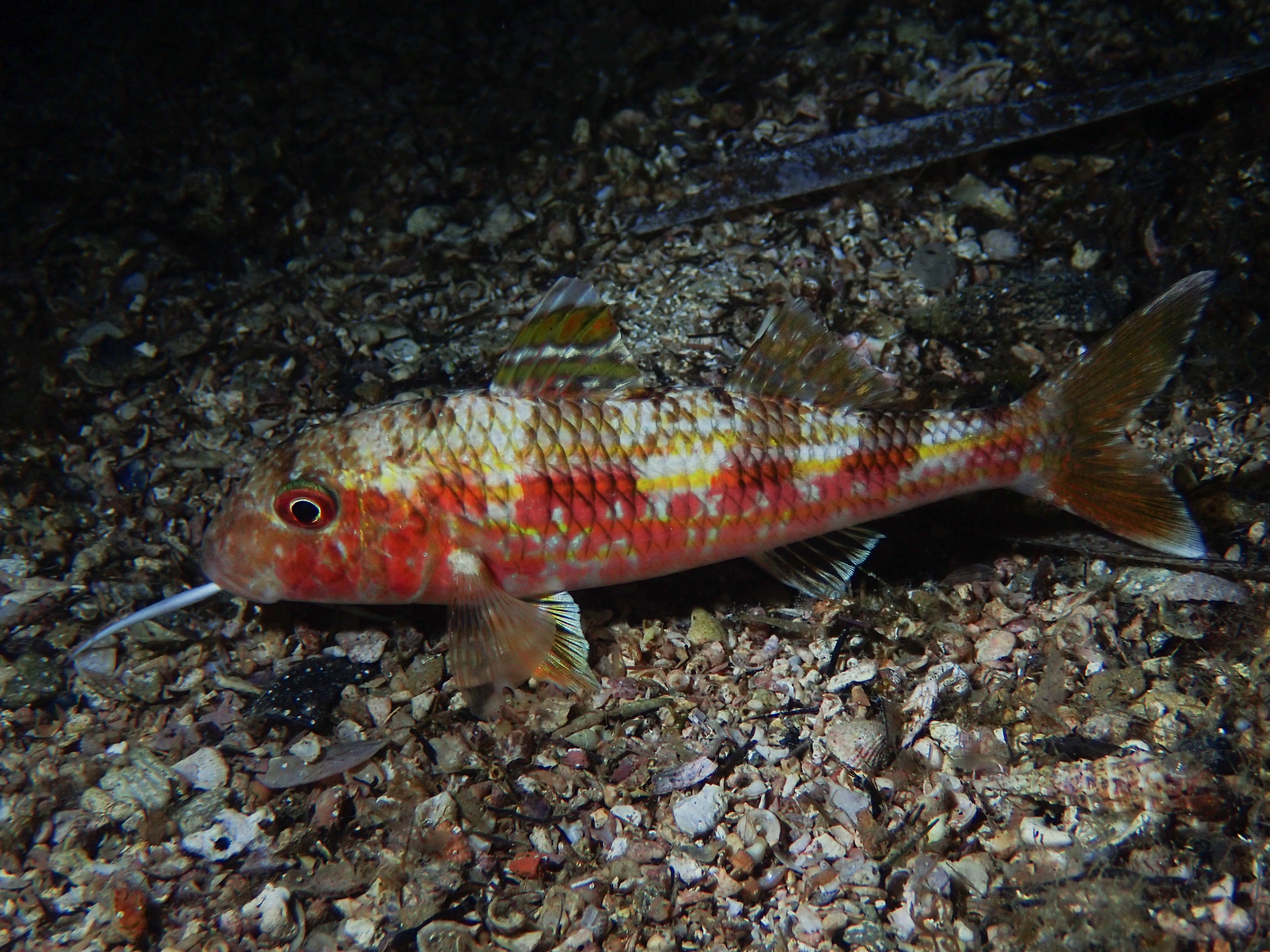
France

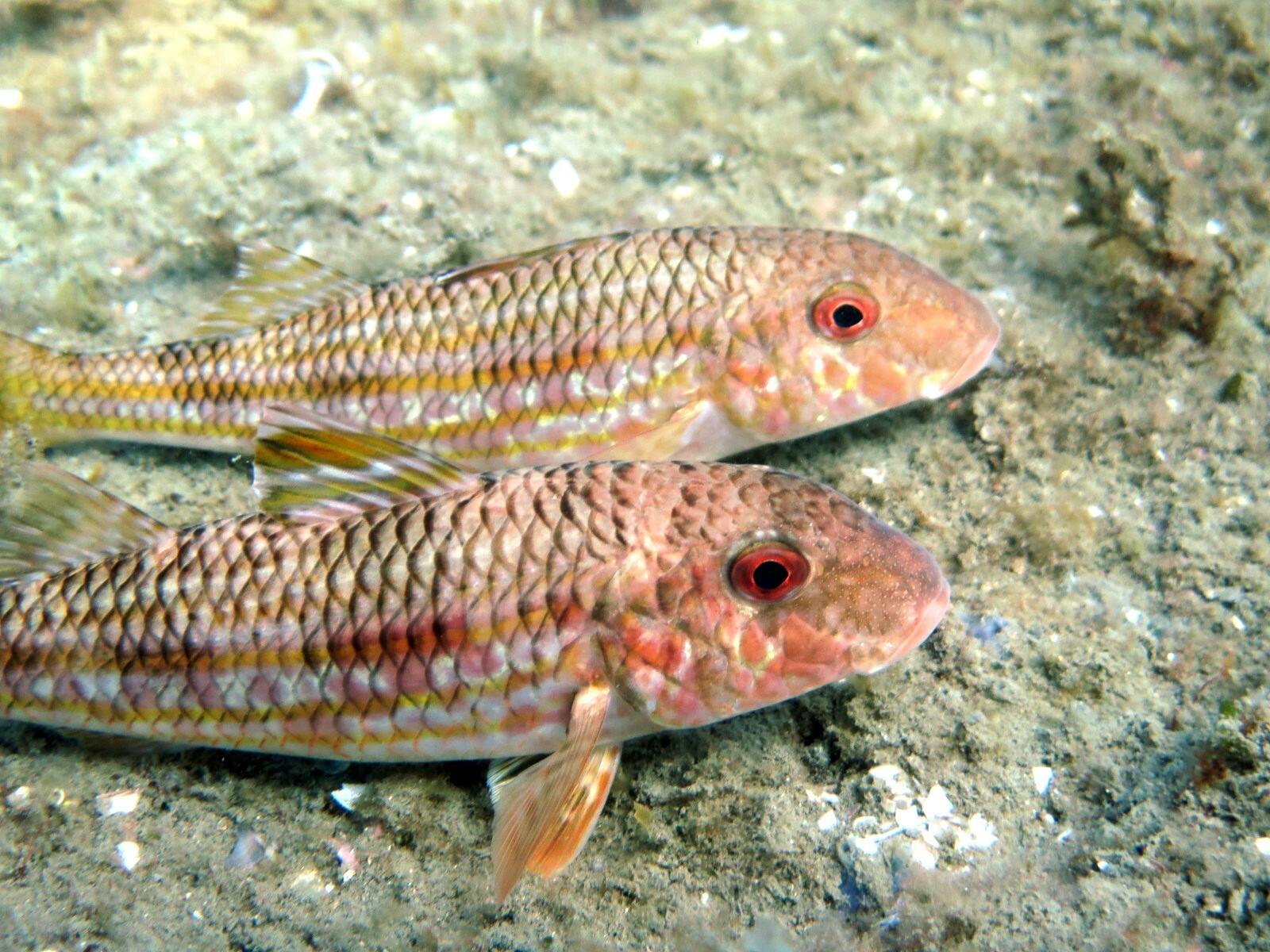
France

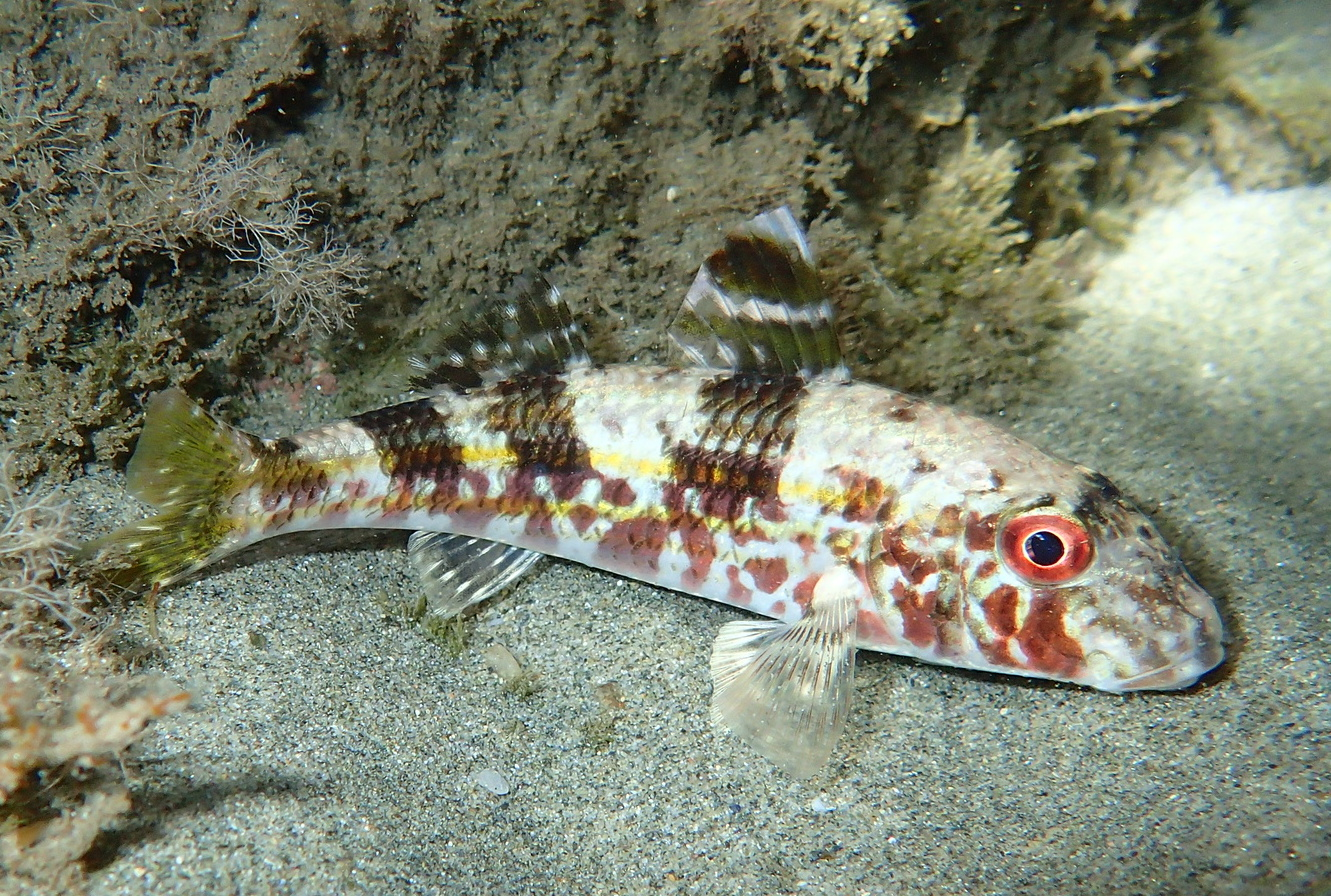
France

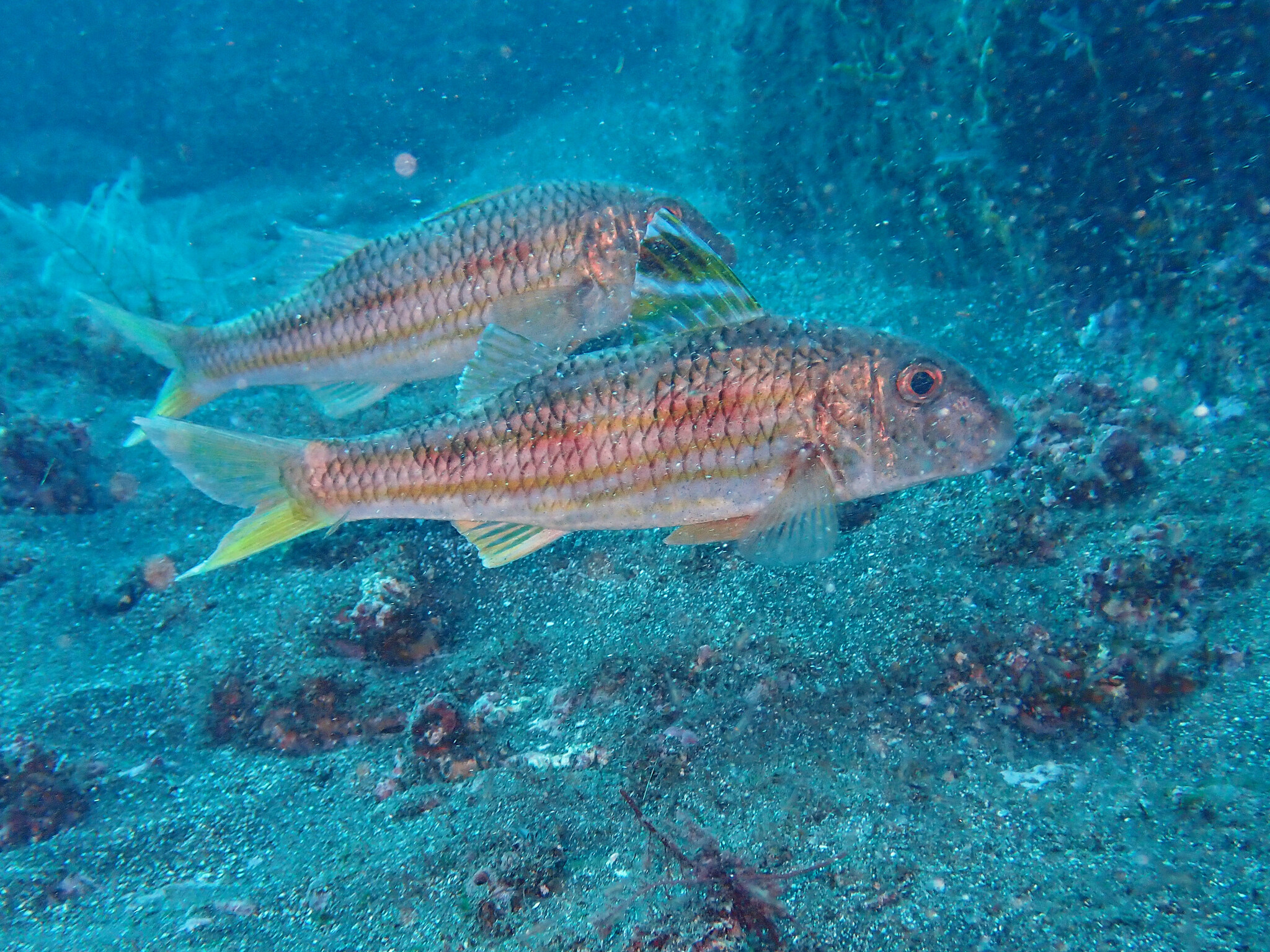
Portugal
