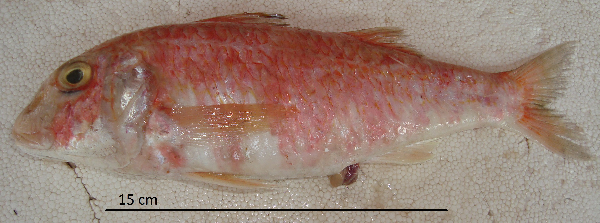

Scientific classification
- Kingdom: Animalia
- Phylum: Chordata
- Class: Actinopterygii
- Order: Syngnathiformes
- Family: Mullidae
- Genus: Mullus
- Species: M. argentinae

Binomial name
- Mullus argentinae Hubbs & Marini, 1933

= Mullus argentinae =

Species of ray-finned fish

Mullus argentinae, the Argentine goatfish, is a species of ray-finned fish, a goatfish from the family Mullidae which is native to the western South Atlantic Ocean from Brazil to northern Argentina. This species was formally described in 1933 by Carl Leavitt Hubbs and Tomás Leandro Marini with the type locality given as the port of Quequén in Argentina.
