= Paraphyonus =

Scientific classification
- Kingdom: Animalia
- Phylum: Chordata
- Class: Actinopterygii
- Order: Ophidiiformes
- Family: Aphyonidae
- Genus: Paraphyonus; J. G. Nielsen, 2015

Type species
- Paraphyonus iselini Nielsen 2015

Genus of fishes

Paraphyonus is a genus of blind cusk eels found in the Atlantic, Indian and Pacific Oceans. This genus was created for species formerly classified under Aphyonus when sampling of specimens showed that the type species of Aphyonus, A. gelatinosus, was not closely related to the other known species in the genus, including the newly identified species P. iselini and P. merretti. This work also brought Barathronus solomonensis into the new genus. The result of this classification is that Aphyonus would be a monotypic genus.

== Species ==
There are currently 6 recognized species in this genus:

- Paraphyonus bolini (J. G. Nielsen, 1974)
- Paraphyonus brevidorsalis (J. G. Nielsen, 1969)
- Paraphyonus iselini J. G. Nielsen, 2015
- Paraphyonus merretti J. G. Nielsen, 2015
- Paraphyonus rassi (J. G. Nielsen, 1975)
- Paraphyonus solomonensis (J. G. Nielsen & Møller, 2008)
