= Sainte-Blandine =

Sainte-Blandine is the name of two communes in France, named for Blandina, virgin and martyr:

- Sainte-Blandine, Isère, in the Isère département
- Sainte-Blandine, Deux-Sèvres, in the Deux-Sèvres département
