= Nybelinella =

Scientific classification
- Kingdom: Animalia
- Phylum: Chordata
- Class: Actinopterygii
- Order: Ophidiiformes
- Family: Aphyonidae
- Genus: Nybelinella; J. G. Nielsen, 1972

Type species
- Barathronus erikssoni Nybelin, 1957

Synonyms
- Nybelinia Nielsen, 1969

Genus of fishes

Nybelinella is a genus of blind cusk eels.

== Species ==
There are currently two recognized species in this genus:

- Nybelinella brevianalis Nielsen, 2017
- Nybelinella brevidorsalis Shcherbachev, 1976
- Nybelinella erikssoni (Nybelin, 1957)
