= Red mullet =

Scientific classification
- Domain: Eukaryota
- Kingdom: Animalia
- Phylum: Chordata
- Class: Actinopterygii
- Order: Syngnathiformes
- Family: Mullidae
- Genus: Mullus

Red mullet species
- Mullus barbatus; Mullus surmuletus

Common name for several species of fish

The red mullets or surmullets are two species of goatfish, Mullus barbatus and Mullus surmuletus, found in the Mediterranean Sea, east North Atlantic Ocean, and the Black Sea. Both "red mullet" and "surmullet" can also refer to the Mullidae in general.

== Classification ==
Though they can easily be distinguished—M. surmuletus has a striped first dorsal fin—their common names overlap in many of the languages of the region. In English, M. surmuletus is sometimes called the striped red mullet. Despite the English name "red mullet", these fishes of the goatfish family Mullidae are not closely related to many other species called "mullet", which are members of the grey mullet family Mugilidae. The word "surmullet" comes from the French, and ultimately probably from a Germanic root "sor" 'reddish brown'.

== Cultural impact ==
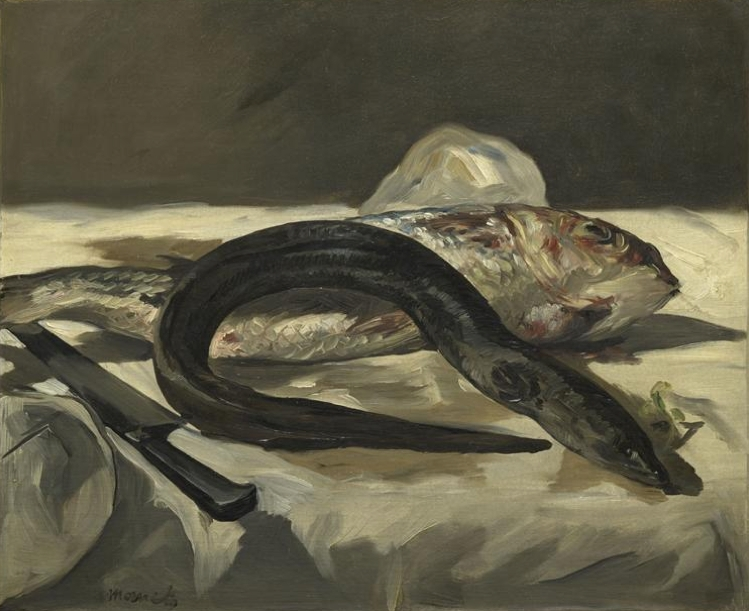
Rouget et Anguille, by Édouard Manet (1864).

They are both favored delicacies in the Mediterranean, and in antiquity were "one of the most famous and valued fish". They are very similar, and cooked in the same ways. M. surmuletus is perhaps somewhat more prized. The ancient Romans reared them in ponds where they were attended and caressed by their owners, and taught to come to be fed at the sound of the voice or bell of the keeper. Specimens were sometimes sold for their weight in silver. Pliny cites a case in which a large sum was paid for a single fish, and an extraordinary expenditure of time was lavished upon these slow-learning pets. Juvenal and other satirists descanted upon the height to which the pursuit of this luxury was carried as a type of extravagance. The statesman Titus Annius Milo, exiled to Marseille in 52 B.C., joked that he would have no regrets as long as he could eat the delicious red mullet of Marseille.

Claudius Aelianus in his On the Nature of Animals, writes that the species is sacred to the Greek agricultural goddess Demeter. "At Eleusis it [the Red Mullet] is held in honour by the initiated, and of this honour two accounts are given. Some say, it is because it gives birth three times in a year; others, because it eats the Sea-Hare, which is deadly to man." The red mullet was also significant in the cult of the witch goddess Hecate.
