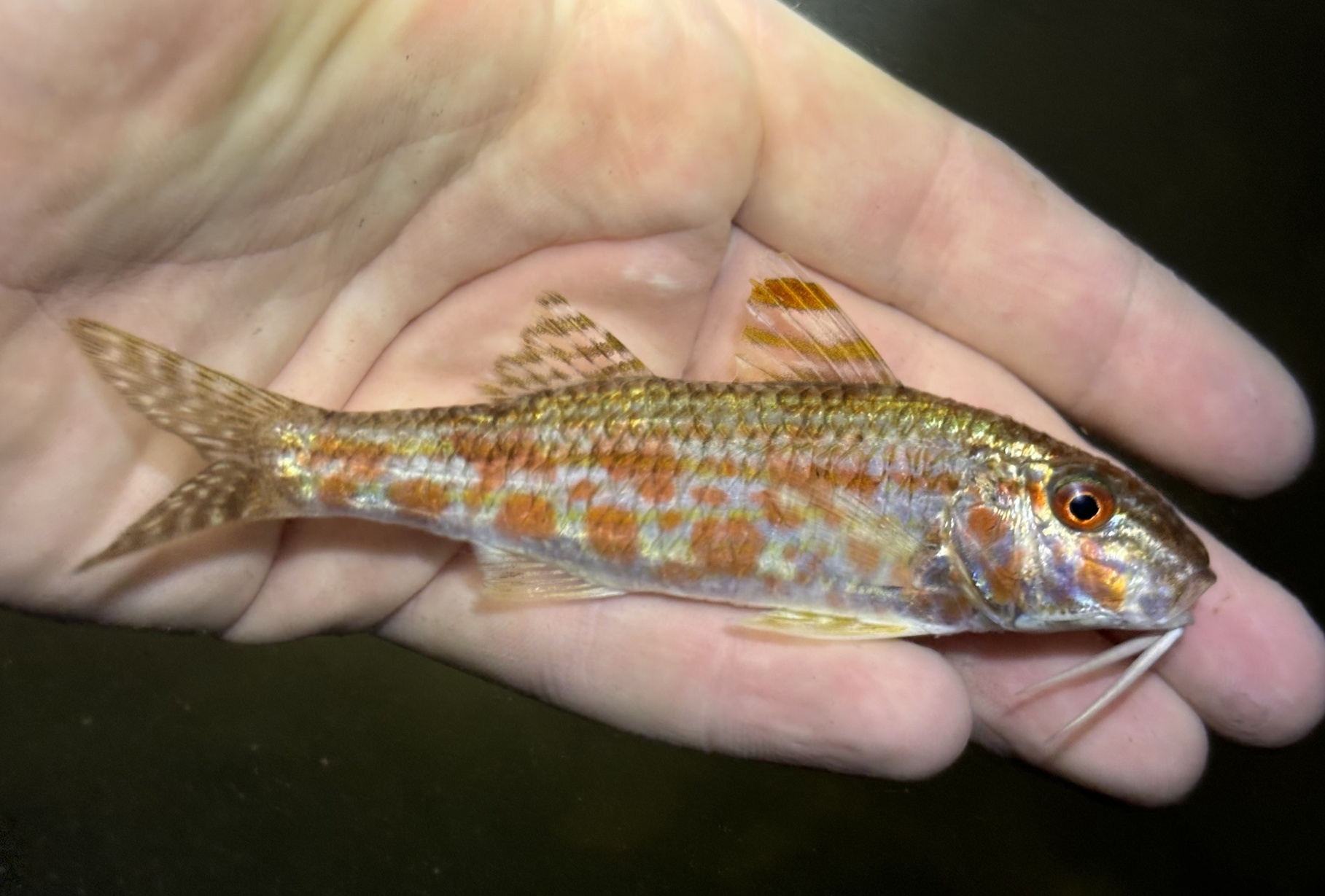

Conservation status
- Least Concern (IUCN 3.1)

Scientific classification
- Kingdom: Animalia
- Phylum: Chordata
- Class: Actinopterygii
- Order: Syngnathiformes
- Family: Mullidae
- Genus: Mullus
- Species: M. auratus

Binomial name
- Mullus auratus Jordan & Gilbert, 1882

= Mullus auratus =

Species of fish

Mullus auratus, the red goatfish or northern goatfish, is a species of ray-finned fish, a goatfish from the family Mullidae which is native to the western Atlantic Ocean.

== Description ==
Mullus auratus has a moderately elongated, cylindrical body with a steep forehead with its upper jaw extending as far as the eye. It has no teeth in the upper jaw but does have teeth in its palate. It has two long barbels on its chin which fold into a groove on the throat. It is a reddish colour on the back and whitish on the belly, there is a reddish stripe along the flank which runs from the snout to the caudal peduncle with between 2 and 5 paler yellowish stripes visible too. The first dorsal fin has an orange stripe at its base and a wider and darker reddish brown stripe at its tip. The second dorsal fin has a number of reddish stripes. The lobes of the tail are marked with indistinct crossbars. There are a total of 9 spines in the dorsal fins and 8 soft rays while the anal fin has 2 spines and 6 soft rays. The maximum recorded total length for females is 27 centimetres (11 in) and 25 centimetres (9.8 in) for males.

== Distribution ==
Mullus auratus occurs in the western Atlantic Ocean from Nova Scotia south to Guyana, it also occurs around Bermuda. However, it is rare north of Florida and is absent from the Bahamas.

== Habitat and biology ==
Mullus auratus is a demersal species which is found over coastal mud or silty sand bottoms where it uses its barbels to find benthic invertebrates. This species is commoner in offshore oceanic, continental shelf waters than it is in coastal habitats. It is normally found between 10 and 60 metres (33 and 197 ft) over a sand-mud substrate. The larvae and juveniles are associated with Sargassum weed.

== Usage ==
Mullus auratus is of minor commercial importance and in the Gulf of Mexico it is subjected to a low level of fishing pressure. Its flesh is considered to be of excellent quality and is marketed fresh.
