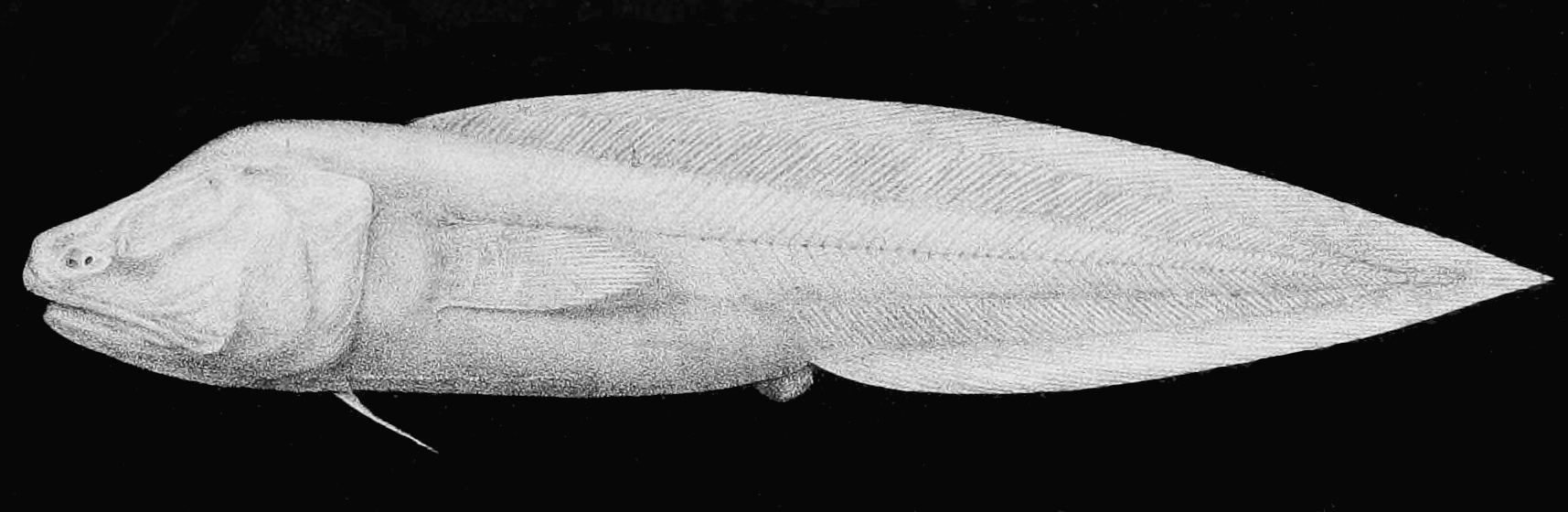

Scientific classification
- Kingdom: Animalia
- Phylum: Chordata
- Class: Actinopterygii
- Division: Teleostei
- Order: Ophidiiformes
- Family: Aphyonidae
- Genus: Aphyonus
- Species: A. gelatinosus

Binomial name
- Aphyonus gelatinosus Günther, 1878

Synonyms
- Aphyonus mollis Goode & Bean, 1886

= Aphyonus gelatinosus =

Species of fish

Aphyonus gelatinosus also known as the gelatinous blindfish is a species of blind cusk eel found in eastern Atlantic Ocean from Azores and Canary Islands; western Indian Ocean in Natal, South Africa and southwest Pacific Ocean known in Australia only from the type locality, off Cape York, Queensland.
