= Meteoria =

Scientific classification
- Kingdom: Animalia
- Phylum: Chordata
- Class: Actinopterygii
- Division: Teleostei
- Order: Ophidiiformes
- Family: Aphyonidae
- Genus: Meteoria
- Species: M. erythrops

Binomial name
- Meteoria erythrops J. G. Nielsen, 1969

Species of fish

Meteoria erythrops is a species of blind cusk eel native to the Atlantic Ocean where it is found at depths of from 4,540 to 5,320 metres (14,900 to 17,450 ft). This species grows to a length of 7.5 centimetres (3.0 in) SL. This is the only known species in its genus.
