= Parasciadonus =

Scientific classification
- Kingdom: Animalia
- Phylum: Chordata
- Class: Actinopterygii
- Order: Ophidiiformes
- Family: Aphyonidae
- Genus: Parasciadonus; J. G. Nielsen, 1984

Type species
- Parasciadonus brevibrachium Nielsen, 1984

Genus of fishes

Parasciadonus is a genus of blind cusk eels found in the western Pacific Ocean.

== Species ==
There are currently two recognized species in this genus:

- Parasciadonus brevibrachium J. G. Nielsen, 1984
- Parasciadonus pauciradiatus J. G. Nielsen, 1997
