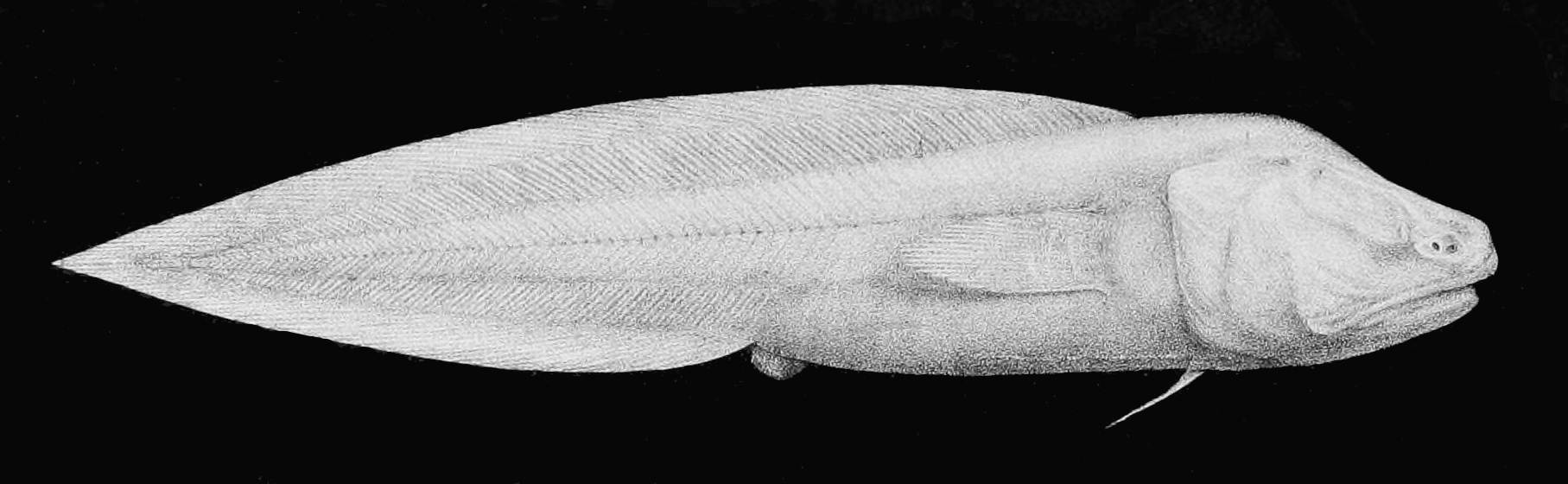
- Aphyonus gelatinosus

Scientific classification
- Kingdom: Animalia
- Phylum: Chordata
- Class: Actinopterygii
- Order: Ophidiiformes
- Family: Aphyonidae
- Genus: Aphyonus; Günther, 1878

Type species
- Aphyonus gelatinosus Günther, 1878

= Aphyonus =

Genus of fishes

Aphyonus is a genus of blind cusk eels from the family Aphyonidae. It contains four species. A sampling of specimens of Aphyonus showed that the type species of Aphyonus, A. gelatinosus, was not closely related to the other known species in the genus, and a new genus Paraphyonus was named for these, including two newly identified species. The result of this classification is that Aphyonus would be a monotypic genus.

== Species ==
The four species of Aphyonus are:

- Aphyonus bolini Nielsen, 1974
- Aphyonus brevidorsalis Nielsen, 1969
- Aphyonus gelatinosus Günther, 1878
- Aphyonus rassi Nielsen, 1975
