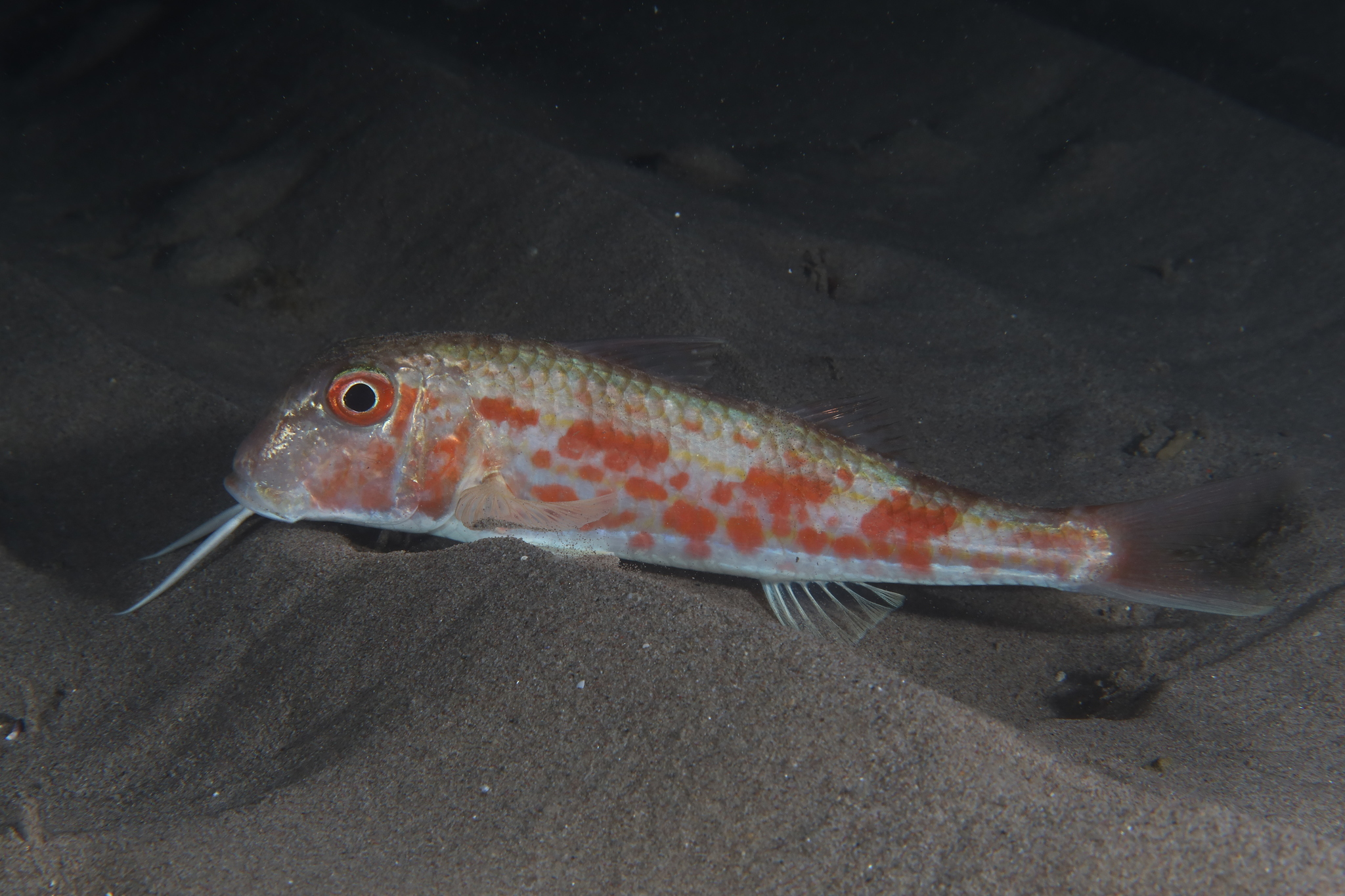
- Red mullet (Mullus barbatus)

Scientific classification
- Kingdom: Animalia
- Phylum: Chordata
- Class: Actinopterygii
- Division: Teleostei
- Order: Syngnathiformes
- Family: Mullidae
- Genus: Mullus; Linnaeus, 1758

Type species
- Mullus barbatus Linnaeus, 1758

= Mullus =

Mullus Temporal range: Early Miocene–present

Genus of ray-finned fishes

Mullus is a subtropical marine genus of ray-finned fish of the family Mullidae (goatfish) and includes the red mullets, occurring mainly in the southwest Atlantic near the South American coast and in the Eastern Atlantic including the Mediterranean and the Black Sea. These fish are benthic and can be found resting and feeding over soft substrates.

== Distribution ==
Members of the genus Mullus can be found in the Atlantic Ocean, including the Mediterranean Sea. They are often found over soft substrates, such as sand, in which they search for prey using sensitive whiskers.

== Species ==
There are currently four recognized species in this genus:

Species	Common name	Image
Mullus argentinae Hubbs & Marini, 1933	Argentine goatfish	
Mullus auratus Jordan & Gilbert, 1882	Red goatfish	
Mullus barbatus Linnaeus, 1758	Red mullet	
Mullus surmuletus Linnaeus, 1758	Surmullet	

The following fossil species are known:

- †Mullus bifurcatus Strashimirov, 1972 [otolith] - early-mid Miocene of Bulgaria & Kazakhstan
- †Mullus elongatus Steurbart, 1984 [otolith] - Early Miocene of France & Greece
- †Mullus moldavicus Switchenska, 1959 - late middle Miocene of Moldova

An indeterminate Mullus is also known from fossil skeletons from the middle Miocene of the North Caucasus, Russia.

== Commercial Significance ==
The most commercially important of these species is the Red Mullet (M. barbatus) which is common in Mediterranean cuisine and often fished for using seine nets, a practice thought to be damaging as it can remove large numbers of spawning fish.
