= Tabanus spodopterus =

Scientific classification
- Kingdom: Animalia
- Phylum: Arthropoda
- Clade: Pancrustacea
- Class: Insecta
- Order: Diptera
- Family: Tabanidae
- Subfamily: Tabaninae
- Tribe: Tabanini
- Genus: Tabanus
- Species: T. spodopterus

Binomial name
- Tabanus spodopterus Wiedemann in Meigen, 1820

Synonyms
- Tabanus ponticus Olsufiev, Moucha & Chvála, 1967; Tabanus spodopterus f. slovacus Olsufiev, Moucha & Chvála, 1967; Tabanus spodopterus ssp ibericus Olsufiev, Moucha & Chvála, 1967

Species of fly

Tabanus spodopterus, the black horned giant horsefly, is a species of biting horse-fly. It is widespread in Europe, but only one doubtful specimen has been found in the United Kingdom.
