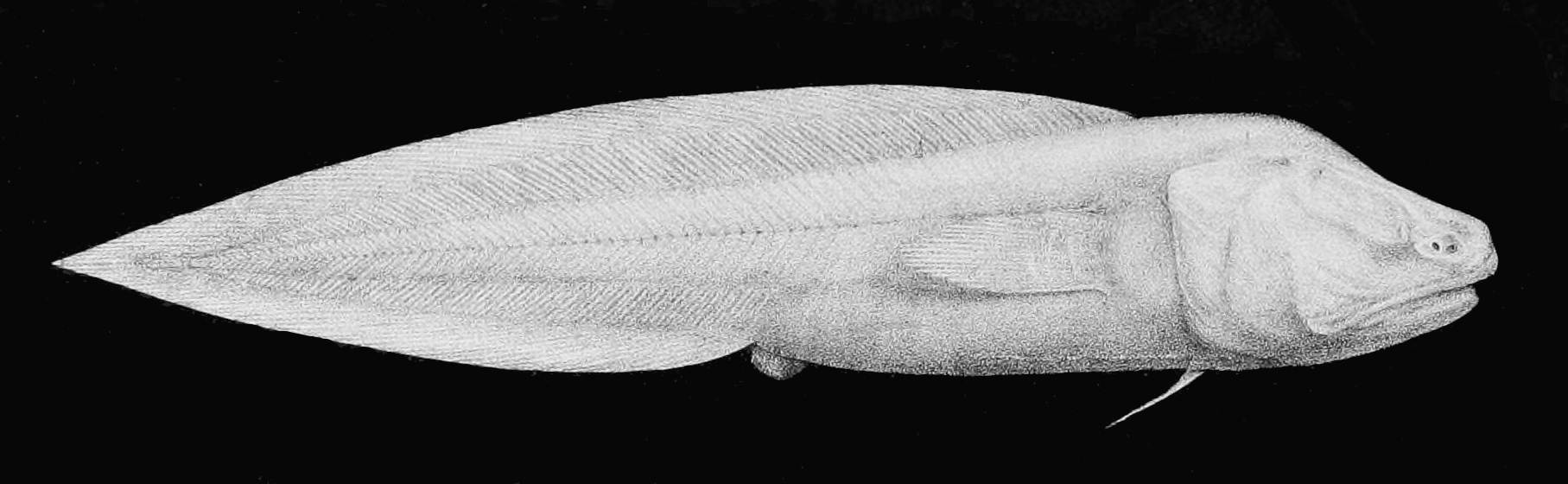
- Aphyonus gelatinosus

Scientific classification
- Kingdom: Animalia
- Phylum: Chordata
- Class: Actinopterygii
- Division: Teleostei
- Order: Ophidiiformes
- Suborder: Bythitoidei
- Family: Aphyonidae; D. S. Jordan & Evermann, 1898

Genera
- Aphyonus Günther, 1878; Barathronus Goode & Bean, 1886; Meteoria Nielsen, 1969; Nybelinella Nielsen, 1972; Paraphyonus Nielsen, 2015; Parasciadonus Nielsen, 1984; Sciadonus Garman, 1899

= Aphyonidae =

Family of fishes

Aphyonidae is a family of eel-like fishes in the order Ophidiiformes. They are found in tropical and subtropical waters throughout the world. They are deep-sea fishes, living between 2,000 metres (6,600 ft) and 6,000 metres (20,000 ft) depth.

== Description and biology ==
Aphyonids are small fishes, typically about 10 centimetres (3.9 in) long when fully grown. They have transparent, gelatinous skin, which lacks any scales. The dorsal, caudal and anal fins are united into a single ribbon. Most species are neotenic, showing a number of features as adults that are more commonly associated with fish larvae. For example, the skeleton is only partially calcified, and the muscles and gills are underdeveloped. The eyes, nasal organ and lateral line are also reduced, and they lack a swim bladder.

The aphyonids are viviparous, giving birth to live young. The males bundle their sperm into small sacs (spermatophores), so that they can be stored for extended periods. This allows them to mate with immature females, which can then store the sperm inside the ovaries until they reach sexual maturity, and the eggs are ready to be fertilised. This unusual adaptation is likely a response to the difficulty of finding a mate in their dark and sparsely inhabited deep-sea environment.
