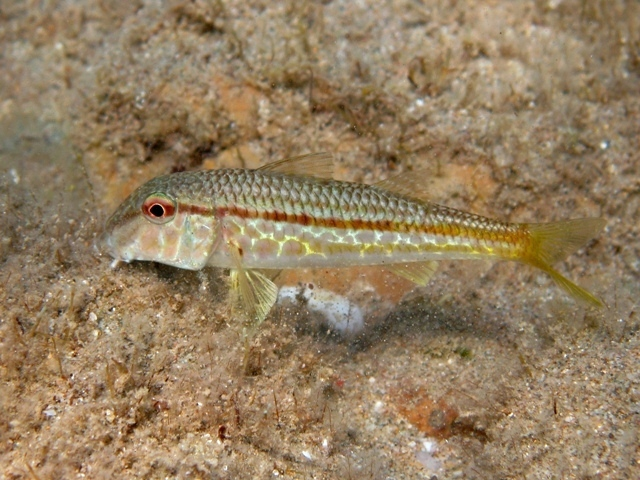

Conservation status
- Least Concern (IUCN 3.1)

Scientific classification
- Kingdom: Animalia
- Phylum: Chordata
- Class: Actinopterygii
- Division: Teleostei
- Order: Syngnathiformes
- Family: Mullidae
- Genus: Mullus
- Species: M. barbatus

Binomial name
- Mullus barbatus Linnaeus, 1758

Synonyms
- Mullus ruber Lacepède, 1801

= Mullus barbatus =

Red mullet

Species of fish

Mullus barbatus (red mullet) is a species of goatfish found in the Mediterranean Sea, Sea of Marmara, the Black Sea and the eastern North Atlantic Ocean, where its range extends from Scandinavia to Senegal. They are fished, mostly by trawling, with the flesh being well regarded. The International Union for Conservation of Nature has assessed their conservation status as being of "least concern".

== Taxonomy ==
This fish was first described in 1758 as Mullus barbatus by the Swedish zoologist Carl Linnaeus in his Systema Naturae. FishBase currently recognizes two subspecies, though the validity of M. b. ponticus is uncertain:

- M. b. barbatus (red mullet) Linnaeus, 1758 (found throughout most of its range)
- M. b. ponticus (blunt-snouted mullet) Essipov, 1927 (found in the Black Sea and the Sea of Azov)

== Description ==
The red mullet can grow to a standard length of 30 cm (12 in), but a more common length is about half that. The body is somewhat laterally compressed. The snout is short and steep and there are no spines on the operculum. The upper jaw is toothless, but there are teeth on the roof of the mouth and on the lower jaw. A pair of moderately long barbels on the chin do not exceed the pectoral fins in length. The first dorsal fin has eight spines (the first one tiny) and the second dorsal fin has one spine and eight soft rays. This fish is rose-pink, without distinctive markings on its fins.

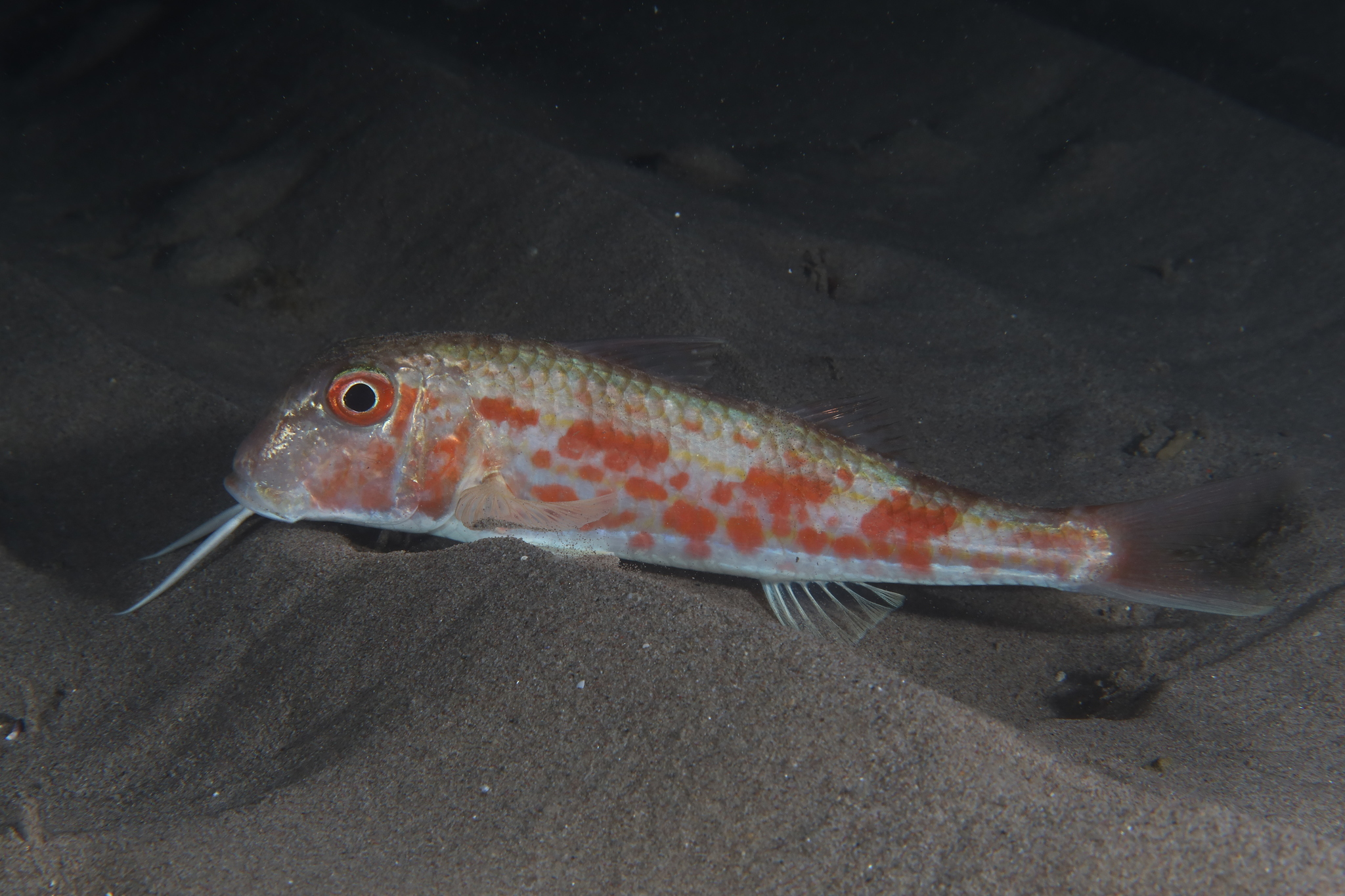
France

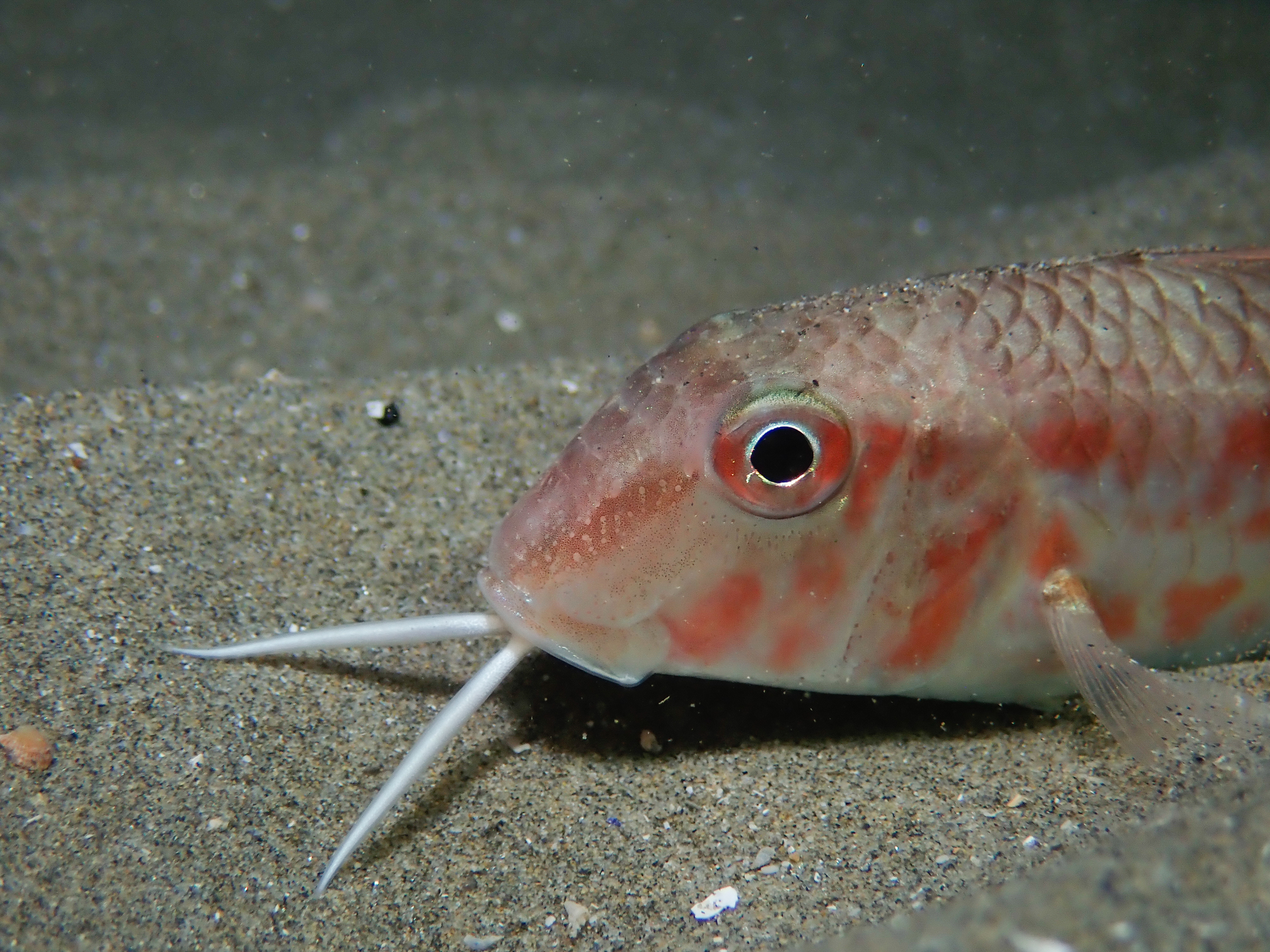
France

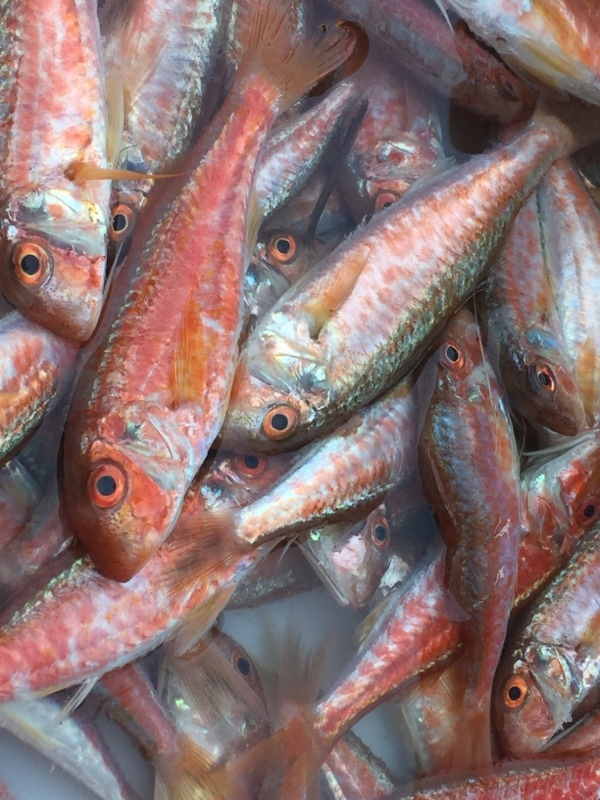
Italy

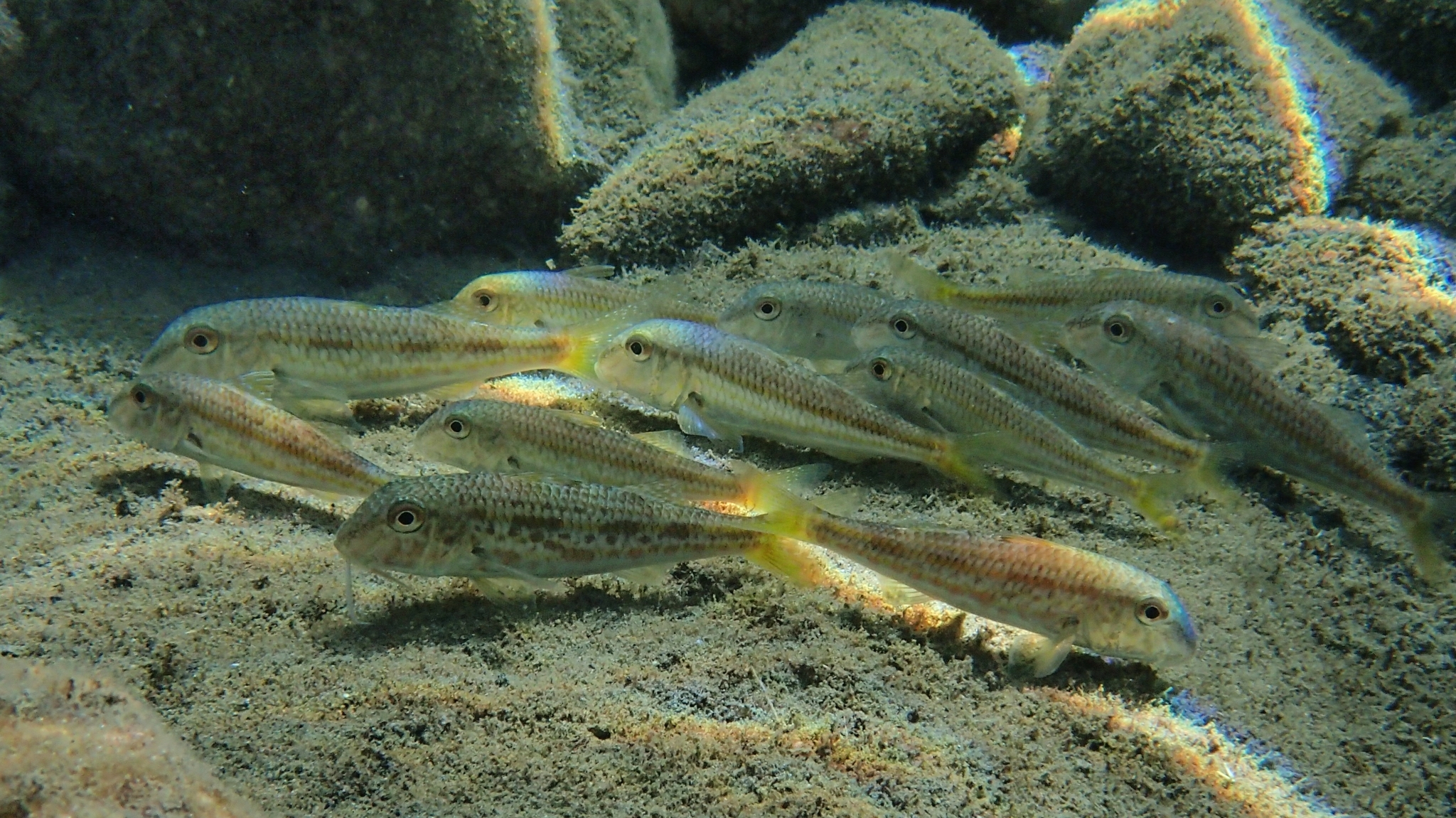
Greece

== Distribution and habitat ==
The red mullet is found in the Mediterranean Sea, the Black Sea and the northeastern and central eastern Atlantic Ocean, where its range extends from Scandinavia southwards to Senegal, including Canary Islands, Azores and Madeira. It is a demersal fish and occurs at depths ranging from 10 to 328 m (30 to 1,080 ft) over muddy, sandy or gravel bottoms.

== Ecology ==
The red mullet is carnivorous, the diet consisting mainly of polychaete worms, bivalve molluscs and crustaceans. The barbels are sensory organs and are used to help locate prey. Both young and adult mullet are preyed on by various fish including the angler fish (Lophius piscatorius), the thornback ray (Raja clavata), the common stingray (Dasyatis pastinaca), the school shark (Galeorhinus galeus), the John Dory (Zeus faber) and the European hake (Merluccius merluccius).

Breeding takes place in the spring and summer, with spawning occurring in April and May in the Adriatic Sea, at depths between 60 and 70 m (200 and 230 ft). The larvae soon move to shallower depths and are pelagic, as are the juveniles at first. At a length of about 5 cm (2 in) the juveniles move to the coast and become demersal, often congregating in estuaries, and sometimes swimming a short distance upstream. Later they disperse to muddy, sandy or gravelly substrates, becoming sexually mature at a length of 10 to 14 cm (4 to 6 in) during their first year of life.

== Status ==
The flesh of the red mullet is much esteemed and it is the target of fisheries, especially in the Mediterranean Sea, Black Sea and northeastern and central eastern Atlantic Ocean. It is mainly caught by trawling, but also with trammel nets, gill nets and hook and line, and in artisanal fisheries with traps and spears. In the Mediterranean there are signs of overfishing, and many of the fish caught are shorter than 15 cm (6 in) in total length, and being under two years old, are not yet sexually mature. For conservation of the species in the Mediterranean, the breeding grounds and nursery areas need to be protected.

It is also heavily fished off the coast of northwestern Africa. Here the fish are caught by local artisan fishermen as well as by foreign industrial fleets; they may be the targeted species or may be bycatch in hake, cephalopod or shrimp fisheries, but the catch statistics are not subdivided by species. There is also thought to be overfishing in the Black Sea. The fish is currently listed by the International Union for Conservation of Nature as being of "least concern" because it has a wide range, occurs at depths down to 328 m (1,080 ft) and is expanding its range northwards as a result of rising sea temperatures.
