= Squalogadus =

Conservation status
- Least Concern (IUCN 3.1)

Scientific classification
- Kingdom: Animalia
- Phylum: Chordata
- Class: Actinopterygii
- Order: Gadiformes
- Suborder: Macrouroidei
- Family: Trachyrincidae
- Genus: Squalogadus; Gilbert & Hubbs, 1916
- Species: S. modificatus

Binomial name
- Squalogadus modificatus Gilbert & Hubbs, 1916

Species of fish

Squalogadus modificatus, the tadpole whiptail, also known as the roundhead tadpole grenadier, is a species of rattail found in the Atlantic and Pacific Oceans where it occurs at depths of from 600 to 1,740 metres (1,970 to 5,710 ft). This species grows to a length of 35 centimetres (14 in) TL. It is the only known member of its genus.
