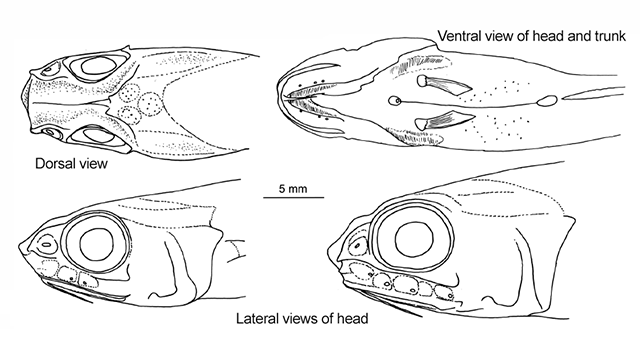

Scientific classification
- Kingdom: Animalia
- Phylum: Chordata
- Class: Actinopterygii
- Order: Gadiformes
- Suborder: Macrouroidei
- Family: Macrouridae
- Genus: Hymenogadus
- Species: H. gracilis

Binomial name
- Hymenogadus gracilis Gilbert & Hubbs, 1920

Synonyms
- Hymenocephalus gracilis Gilbert & Hubbs, 1920

= Graceful grenadier =

Species of fish

The graceful grenadier (Hymenogadus gracilis) is a species of rattail fish. It is found at depths of 160–345 m (525–1,132 ft) in tropical and subtropical seas worldwide. This is one of the smallest of the rattails, growing to no more than 13 cm (5.1 in) in length. It is a slender fish with a large mouth, with rows of very small teeth, positioned in the underside of the skull. There is a short, thin chin barbel. It is more strikingly marked than most rattails, with bold black streaks on the head and black and silver barring over most of the body. There is a long bioluminescent organ with two lenses underneath the rear end of the body.
