= Kumba =

Kumba can refer to:

- Kumba, Cameroon, a city in Southwest Province, Cameroon
- Kumba (fish) is a genus of fishes in the family Macrouridae
- Kumba Ialá (also spelled Yala) (born in 1953) is a Guinea-Bissau politician and former President.
- Kumba language, an Adamawa language of Nigeria
- Kumba (roller coaster), roller coaster at Busch Gardens Tampa
- Kumba Resources, South African iron ore company
- Kumba (Swedish rapper), a Swedish rap artist
- Simaya Kumba, South Sudanese politician
