= Hymenogadus =

Scientific classification
- Kingdom: Animalia
- Phylum: Chordata
- Class: Actinopterygii
- Order: Gadiformes
- Suborder: Macrouroidei
- Family: Macrouridae
- Genus: Hymenogadus; Gilbert & Hubbs, 1920

Type species
- Hymenocephalus gracilis Gilbert & Hubbs 1920

Genus of fishes

Hymenogadus is a genus of rattails, marine fish.

== Species ==
There are currently 2 recognized species in this genus:

- Hymenogadus gracilis Gilbert & Hubbs, 1920 (Graceful grenadier)
- Hymenogadus tenuis Gilbert & Hubbs, 1917 (Slender grenadier)
