= Macrosmia =

Scientific classification
- Kingdom: Animalia
- Phylum: Chordata
- Class: Actinopterygii
- Division: Teleostei
- Order: Gadiformes
- Suborder: Macrouroidei
- Family: Macrouridae
- Genus: Macrosmia; Merrett, Sazonov & Shcherbachev, 1983
- Species: M. phalacra

Binomial name
- Macrosmia phalacra Merrett, Sazonov & Shcherbachev, 1983

Species of fish

Macrosmia phalacra is a species of rattail known from the Ninety East Ridge in the Indian Ocean. This fish is found at depths of from 1,650 to 1,660 metres (5,410 to 5,450 ft).
