= Plainfin grenadier =

Scientific classification
- Domain: Eukaryota
- Kingdom: Animalia
- Phylum: Chordata
- Class: Actinopterygii
- Order: Gadiformes
- Family: Macrouridae
- Subfamily: Macrourinae
- Genus: Ventrifossa
- Species: V. divergens

Binomial name
- Ventrifossa divergens C. H. Gilbert & C. L. Hubbs, 1920

Species of fish

The plainfin grenadier (Ventrifossa divergens) is a species of rattail. This is a deep-water fish found at depths of up to 772 m. It has a wide distribution in the Indian and western Pacific Oceans.

This species reaches a length of 30 cm. As suggested by the common name, it has a uniformly dark first dorsal fin, lacking the contrasting blotch seen in many species in the genus. It also has a black margin to its snout.
