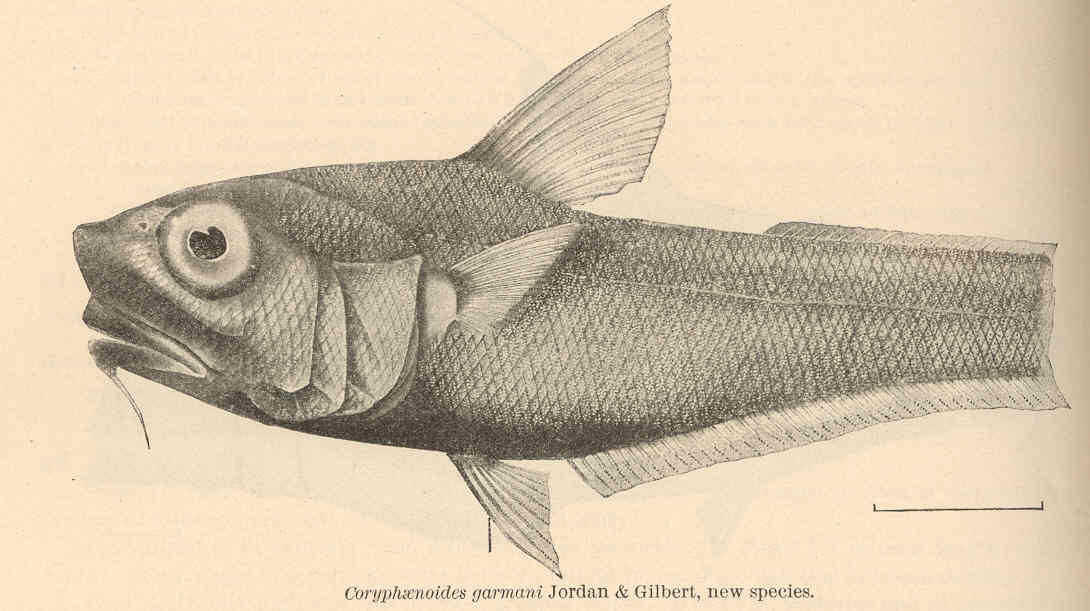
- Ventrifossa garmani

Scientific classification
- Kingdom: Animalia
- Phylum: Chordata
- Class: Actinopterygii
- Order: Gadiformes
- Family: Macrouridae
- Genus: Ventrifossa; Gilbert & Hubbs, 1920

Type species
- Coryphaenoides garmani Jordan & Gilbert, 1904

Synonyms
- Atherodus Gilbert & Hubbs, 1920; Sokodara Iwamoto, 1979

= Ventrifossa =

Ventrifossa Temporal range: 56–0 Ma Early Miocene to Present

Genus of fishes

Ventrifossa is a genus of rattails in the family Macrouridae.

== Species ==
There are currently 23 recognized species in this genus

- Ventrifossa atherodon (C. H. Gilbert & Cramer, 1897) (Arrowtooth grenadier)
- Ventrifossa ctenomelas (C. H. Gilbert & Cramer, 1897) (Hawaiian grenadier)
- Ventrifossa divergens C. H. Gilbert & C. L. Hubbs, 1920 (Plainfin grenadier)
- Ventrifossa garmani (D. S. Jordan & C. H. Gilbert, 1904) (Sagami grenadier)
- Ventrifossa gomoni Iwamoto & A. Williams, 1999 (Pale smiling whiptail)
- Ventrifossa johnboborum Iwamoto, 1982 (Snoutscale whiptail)
- Ventrifossa longibarbata Okamura, 1982
- Ventrifossa macrodon Sazonov & Iwamoto, 1992
- Ventrifossa macropogon N. B. Marshall, 1973 (Longbeard grenadier)
- Ventrifossa macroptera Okamura, 1982 (Palau grenadier)
- Ventrifossa misakia (D. S. Jordan & C. H. Gilbert, 1904) (Misaki grenadier)
- Ventrifossa mucocephalus N. B. Marshall, 1973 (Slimehead grenadier)
- Ventrifossa mystax Iwamoto & M. E. Anderson, 1994
- Ventrifossa nasuta (J. L. B. Smith, 1935) (Conesnout grenadier)
- Ventrifossa nigrodorsalis C. H. Gilbert & C. L. Hubbs, 1920 (Spinaker grenadier)
- Ventrifossa obtusirostris Sazonov & Iwamoto, 1992
- Ventrifossa paxtoni Iwamoto & A. Williams, 1999 (Thinbarbel whiptail)
- Ventrifossa petersonii (Alcock, 1891) (Peterson's grenadier)
- Ventrifossa rhipidodorsalis Okamura, 1984
- Ventrifossa saikaiensis Okamura, 1984
- Ventrifossa sazonovi Iwamoto & A. Williams, 1999 (Dark smiling whiptail)
- Ventrifossa teres Sazonov & Iwamoto, 1992
- Ventrifossa vinolenta Iwamoto & Merrett, 1997
