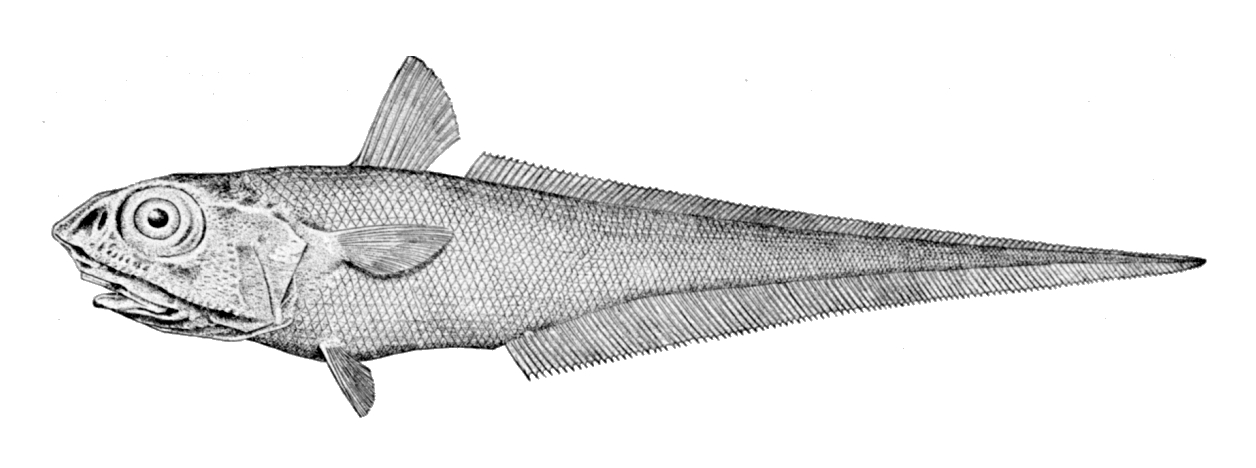
- Macrourus berglax

Scientific classification
- Kingdom: Animalia
- Phylum: Chordata
- Class: Actinopterygii
- Order: Gadiformes
- Suborder: Macrouroidei
- Family: Macrouridae
- Genus: Macrourus
- Species: M. berglax

Binomial name
- Macrourus berglax Lacépède, 1801

Synonyms
- Coryphaenoides berglax (Lacépède, 1801); Macrurus fabricii Sundevall, 1842

= Macrourus berglax =

Species of fish

Macrourus berglax, also known as the roughhead grenadier or onion-eye grenadier, is a species of marine ray-finned fish in the family Macrouridae. It is a deep-sea fish found in the Atlantic Ocean.

== Description ==
The roughhead grenadier can reach a length of one metre. The head occupies about one quarter of the dish's total length; it has a slender body and a long tapering tail. There are some bony spiny scutes or scales on the upper side of the head, but the lower side is scaleless. The snout is pointed, and the small mouth is set far back on the lower side of the head with a short barbel underneath. There are 3 to 5 rows of sharp teeth in the upper jaw and 1 or 2 rows in the lower jaw. The eye is large and bulbous, giving the fish its alternative name of onion-eye grenadier. There are two dorsal fins; the front one has 11 to 13 fin rays, and the hind one runs along the back to the tip of the tail. The anal fin is similarly long and narrow, and there is no tailfin. The body is covered in large, ridged, spiny scales. The general body colour is grey, darker underneath, with dark fins and dark edges on some of the scales.

== Distribution ==
The roughhead grenadier is found in the North Atlantic Ocean at depths between 200 and 2,000 metres (660 and 6,560 ft) and water temperatures below 5.4 °C (41.7 °F). Its range includes the waters around Greenland and Iceland. It extends in the west from the Bear Seamount, Norfolk Canyon, and Georges Bank north to Labrador and the Davis Strait, and in the east from Ireland north to the Faeroe Islands, Norway, Spitzbergen, and the Barents Sea.

== Biology ==
The roughhead grenadier feeds on crustaceans and other small invertebrates it finds on the seabed. The diet includes small fish, shrimps, amphipods, polychaete worms, bivalve molluscs, isopods, brittle stars, other echinoderms, and comb jellies.

The roughhead grenadier is a slow growing fish. The females mature at about 14 years and 30 centimetres (12 in) in length, while males mature at a length of 17 centimetres (6.7 in). The potential fecundity of the female is 17,000 to 56,000 eggs. The eggs are laid in batches, and spawning takes place at any time of year, with a peak in late winter and early spring.

== Fishery ==
The roughhead grenadier is landed as a by-catch when fishing for Greenland halibut (Reinhardtius hippoglossoides) and Atlantic halibut (Hippoglossus hippoglossus). In a study off the east coast of Greenland, more males were taken by trawling and more females by long line. This seemed to be due to the females being in the depth range 1,000 to 1,500 metres (3,300 to 4,900 ft) while the males predominated at shallower depths.
