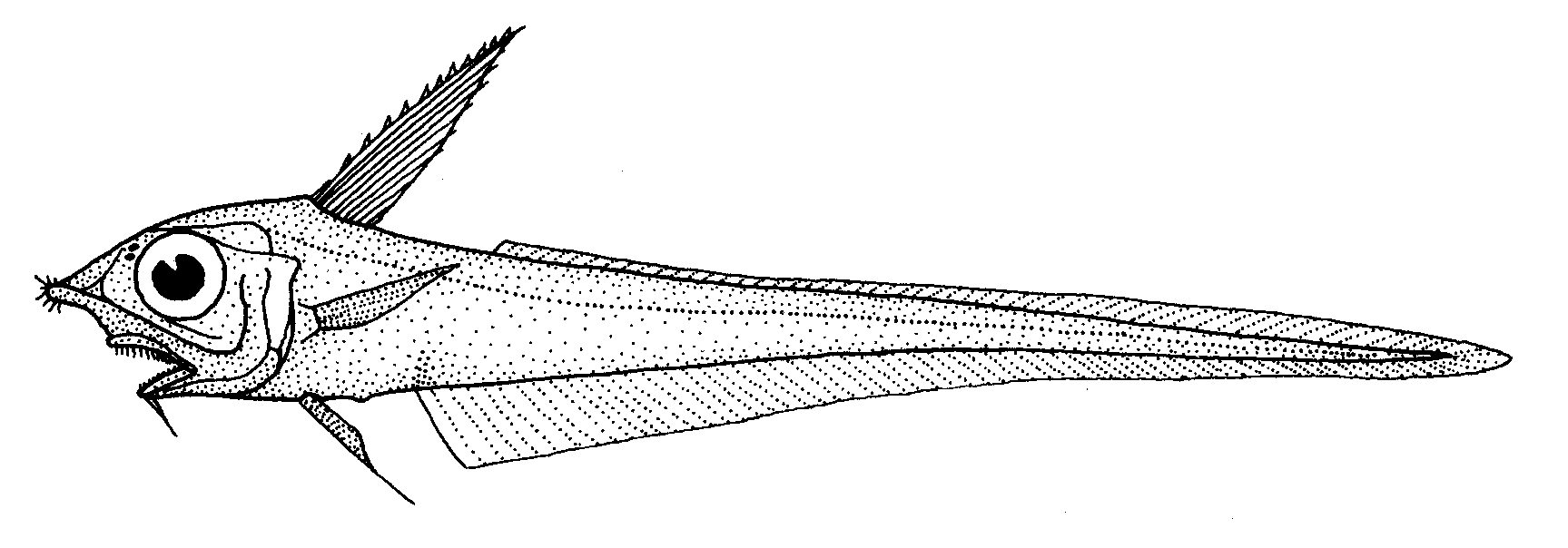
- Drawing by Dr Tony Ayling

Scientific classification
- Kingdom: Animalia
- Phylum: Chordata
- Class: Actinopterygii
- Order: Gadiformes
- Suborder: Macrouroidei
- Family: Macrouridae
- Genus: Nezumia
- Species: N. toi

Binomial name
- Nezumia toi McCann & McKnight, 1980

= Nezumia toi =

Species of fish

Nezumia toi is a rattail of the family Macrouridae, found only in New Zealand at depths of about 950 m. Its length is about 15 cm.
