= Palau grenadier =

Scientific classification
- Kingdom: Animalia
- Phylum: Chordata
- Class: Actinopterygii
- Order: Gadiformes
- Suborder: Macrouroidei
- Family: Macrouridae
- Genus: Ventrifossa
- Species: V. macroptera

Binomial name
- Ventrifossa macroptera Okamura, 1982

Species of fish

The Palau grenadier (Ventrifossa macroptera) is a species of rattail. This is a deep-water fish found at depths of up to 710 m. It has been recorded from many parts of the Pacific Ocean including Hawaii, southern Japan, the Kyushu–Palau Ridge and northeastern Taiwan.

This species is rather similar to many of its congeners and is best distinguished by a combination of morphometric characters. It has a fairly distinctive black pattern on its head and a uniformly dark first dorsal fin (although this latter is not a unique trait). A specimen from Taiwan measured 20.2 cm total length.
