= Ventrifossa longibarbata =

Scientific classification
- Kingdom: Animalia
- Phylum: Chordata
- Class: Actinopterygii
- Order: Gadiformes
- Suborder: Macrouroidei
- Family: Macrouridae
- Genus: Ventrifossa
- Species: V. longibarbata

Binomial name
- Ventrifossa longibarbata Okamura, 1982

Species of fish

Ventrifossa longibarbata is a species of rattail. This is a deep-water fish found at depths of up to 600 m. It is found in the waters off southern Japan and southeastern Taiwan.

This is a largely bright silver rattail which reaches a length of up to 30 cm. It has a small head with a short, broad snout, an inferior mouth and a long barbel on the lower jaw. The first dorsal fin is black with white base and tip. There is a small bioluminescent organ located between the bases of the pelvic fins.
