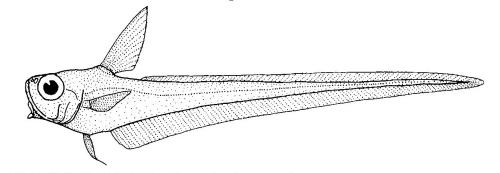
- Drawing by Dr Tony Ayling

Scientific classification
- Kingdom: Animalia
- Phylum: Chordata
- Class: Actinopterygii
- Order: Gadiformes
- Suborder: Macrouroidei
- Family: Macrouridae
- Genus: Lucigadus
- Species: L. nigromaculatus

Binomial name
- Lucigadus nigromaculatus (McCulloch, 1907)

= Blackspotted grenadier =

Species of fish

The blackspotted grenadier or blackspot rattail, Lucigadus nigromaculatus, is a rattail, one of seven in the genus Lucigadus. It is found around southern Australia, New Zealand, and Chile, at depths of between 400 and 1,400 m. This species length is between 15 and 30 cm.
