= Ventrifossa saikaiensis =

Scientific classification
- Kingdom: Animalia
- Phylum: Chordata
- Class: Actinopterygii
- Order: Gadiformes
- Suborder: Macrouroidei
- Family: Macrouridae
- Genus: Ventrifossa
- Species: V. saikaiensis

Binomial name
- Ventrifossa saikaiensis Okamura, 1984

Species of fish

Ventrifossa saikaiensis is a species of rattail. This is a deep-water fish found at depths of up to 740 m. It is found in the waters off southern Japan and northeastern Taiwan.

This species reaches a length of up to 25 cm. It has a pointed snout, a large, inferior mouth with a dark margin on the upper lip and a long chin barbel. The first dorsal fin is entirely dark, lacking the contrasting patches seen in some members of the genus. There is a large bioluminescent organ located between the bases of the pelvic fins.
