= Idiolophorhynchus =

Scientific classification
- Kingdom: Animalia
- Phylum: Chordata
- Class: Actinopterygii
- Division: Teleostei
- Order: Gadiformes
- Suborder: Macrouroidei
- Family: Trachyrincidae
- Genus: Idiolophorhynchus; Sazonov, 1981
- Species: I. andriashevi

Binomial name
- Idiolophorhynchus andriashevi Sazonov, 1981

Species of fish

Idiolophorhynchus andriashevi, the pineapple whiptail or pineapple rattail, is a species of rattail found along the western and southern coasts of Australia and around New Zealand. This is a benthic species of fish found along the continental slopes at depths of from 1,190 to 2,350 metres (3,900 to 7,710 ft).
