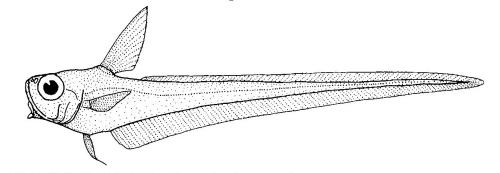
- Lucigadus nigromaculatus

Scientific classification
- Kingdom: Animalia
- Phylum: Chordata
- Class: Actinopterygii
- Division: Teleostei
- Order: Gadiformes
- Family: Macrouridae
- Genus: Lucigadus; Gilbert & Hubbs, 1920

Type species
- Macrourus lucifer Smith & Radcliffe, 1912

= Lucigadus =

Genus of fishes

Lucigadus is a genus of rattails.

== Species ==
There are currently 7 recognized species in this genus:

- Lucigadus acrolophus Iwamoto & Merrett, 1997
- Lucigadus borealis Iwamoto & Okamoto, 2015
- Lucigadus lucifer (H.M. Smith & Radcliffe, 1912)
- Lucigadus microlepis (Günther, 1878) (Small-fin whiptail)
- Lucigadus nigromaculatus (McCulloch, 1907) (Black-spotted grenadier)
- Lucigadus nigromarginatus (H. M. Smith & Radcliffe, 1912)
- Lucigadus ori (J. L. B. Smith, 1968) (Bronze whiptail)
