= Echinomacrurus occidentalis =

Scientific classification
- Kingdom: Animalia
- Phylum: Chordata
- Class: Actinopterygii
- Order: Gadiformes
- Suborder: Macrouroidei
- Family: Macrouridae
- Genus: Echinomacrurus
- Species: E. occidentalis

Binomial name
- Echinomacrurus occidentalis Iwamoto, 1979

Species of fish

Echinomacrurus occidentalis is a marine species of fish in the genus Echinomacrurus.

It is located in the Eastern Pacific, off the coast of Peru. It usually lives in deep water and has been known to go as deep as 4337 meters. The maximum length of an Echinomacrurus is about 37.0 cm.
