= Arrowtooth grenadier =

Scientific classification
- Domain: Eukaryota
- Kingdom: Animalia
- Phylum: Chordata
- Class: Actinopterygii
- Order: Gadiformes
- Family: Macrouridae
- Subfamily: Macrourinae
- Genus: Ventrifossa
- Species: V. atherodon

Binomial name
- Ventrifossa atherodon (C. H. Gilbert & Cramer, 1897)

Species of fish

The arrowtooth grenadier (Ventrifossa atherodon) is a species of rattail. This is a deep-water fish found at depths of up to 950 m. It was originally recorded from the waters around Hawaii but has recently also been recorded near Taiwan, which suggests it has a far wider distribution than previously thought.

This species reaches a length of 31 cm. As suggested by the common name, it has distinctive dentition, the outer row of premaxillary teeth enlarged and recurved with arrow-shaped points. It can also be distinguished by a distinctive black pattern on the head and a uniformly dark first dorsal fin.
