= Kumba japonica =

Scientific classification
- Kingdom: Animalia
- Phylum: Chordata
- Class: Actinopterygii
- Order: Gadiformes
- Suborder: Macrouroidei
- Family: Macrouridae
- Genus: Kumba
- Species: K. japonica

Binomial name
- Kumba japonica Matsubara, 1943

Species of fish

Kumba japonica is a species of rattail. It is found at depths of up to 710 m in the waters around Taiwan and southern Japan.

This fish reaches a length of up to 18 cm. Its main diagnostic features are its very short snout and three black spots at the base of the anal fin. Unlike many rattails and other deep-water fish, the bones of the head are firm.
