= Macrouroides =

Scientific classification
- Kingdom: Animalia
- Phylum: Chordata
- Class: Actinopterygii
- Division: Teleostei
- Order: Gadiformes
- Suborder: Macrouroidei
- Family: Trachyrincidae
- Genus: Macrouroides; H. M. Smith & Radcliffe, 1912
- Species: M. inflaticeps

Binomial name
- Macrouroides inflaticeps H. M. Smith & Radcliffe, 1912

Species of fish

Macrouroides inflaticeps, the Inflated whiptail, is a species of rattail found in the oceans at depths of from 747 to 4,000 metres (2,451 to 13,123 ft) on the continental slopes. This species grows to a length of 48 centimetres (19 in) TL.
