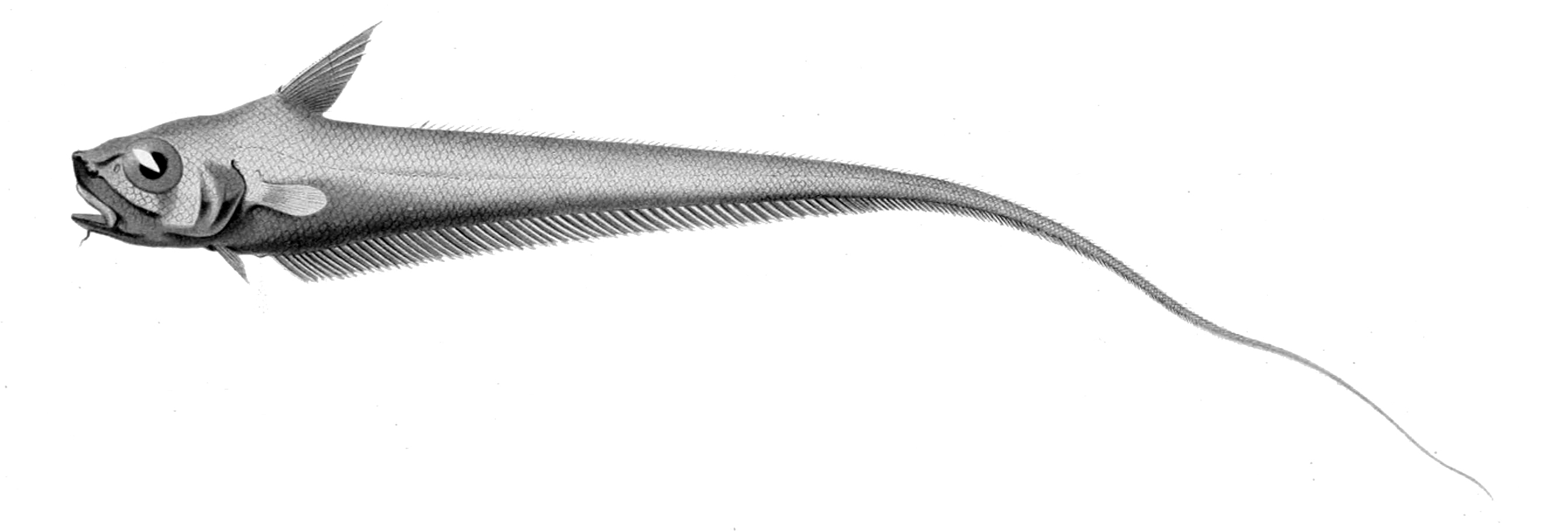
- Sphagemacrurus hirundo

Scientific classification
- Domain: Eukaryota
- Kingdom: Animalia
- Phylum: Chordata
- Class: Actinopterygii
- Order: Gadiformes
- Family: Macrouridae
- Subfamily: Macrourinae
- Genus: Sphagemacrurus; Fowler, 1925

Type species
- Macrurus hirundo Collett, 1896

Synonyms
- Grenurus Parr, 1946

= Sphagemacrurus =

Genus of fishes

Sphagemacrurus is a genus of rattails.

== Species ==
There are currently six recognized species in this genus:

- Sphagemacrurus decimalis (C. H. Gilbert & C. L. Hubbs, 1920)
- Sphagemacrurus gibber (C. H. Gilbert & Cramer, 1897)
- Sphagemacrurus grenadae (A. E. Parr, 1946) (Pugnose grenadier)
- Sphagemacrurus hirundo (Collett, 1896) (Swallow grenadier)
- Sphagemacrurus pumiliceps (Alcock, 1894) (Dwarf whiptail)
- Sphagemacrurus richardi (M. C. W. Weber, 1913) (Richard's whiptail)
