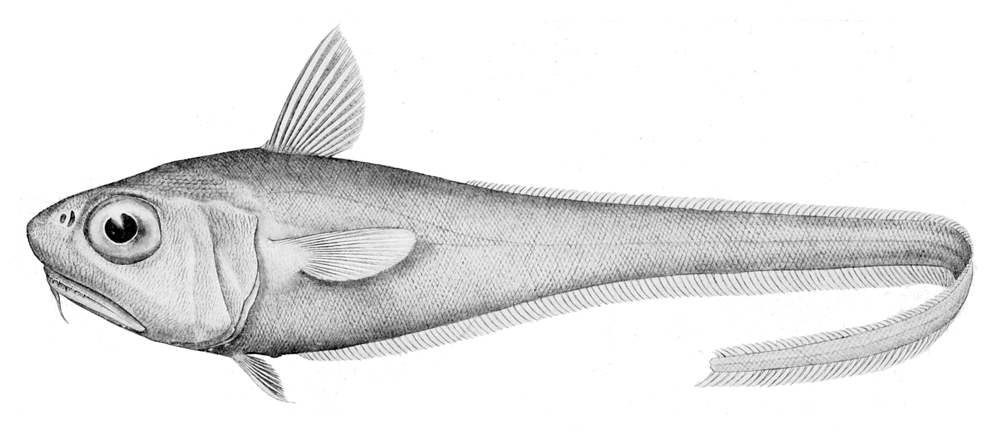

Scientific classification
- Kingdom: Animalia
- Phylum: Chordata
- Class: Actinopterygii
- Order: Gadiformes
- Family: Macrouridae
- Genus: Malacocephalus
- Species: M. laevis

Binomial name
- Malacocephalus laevis (Lowe, 1843)

= Malacocephalus laevis =

Species of fish

Malacocephalus laevis is a species of fish belonging to the family Macrouridae.

It has cosmopolitan distribution.
