= Ilyophis blachei =

Scientific classification
- Domain: Eukaryota
- Kingdom: Animalia
- Phylum: Chordata
- Class: Actinopterygii
- Order: Anguilliformes
- Family: Synaphobranchidae
- Genus: Ilyophis
- Species: I. blachei

Binomial name
- Ilyophis blachei Saldanha & Merrett, 1982

Species of fish

Ilyophis blachei is an eel in the family Synaphobranchidae (cutthroat eels). It was described by Luiz Vieria Caldas Saldanha and Nigel Merrett in 1982. It is a marine, deep water-dwelling eel which is known from the northeastern and southeastern Atlantic and southern Indian Ocean. It dwells at a depth range 580 to 2,070 metres (1,900 to 6,790 ft), and inhabits the continental shelf. Males can reach a maximum total length of 79.2 centimetres (31.2 in).

I. blachei spawns in June and July. Its diet consists primarily of galatheid crustaceans.
