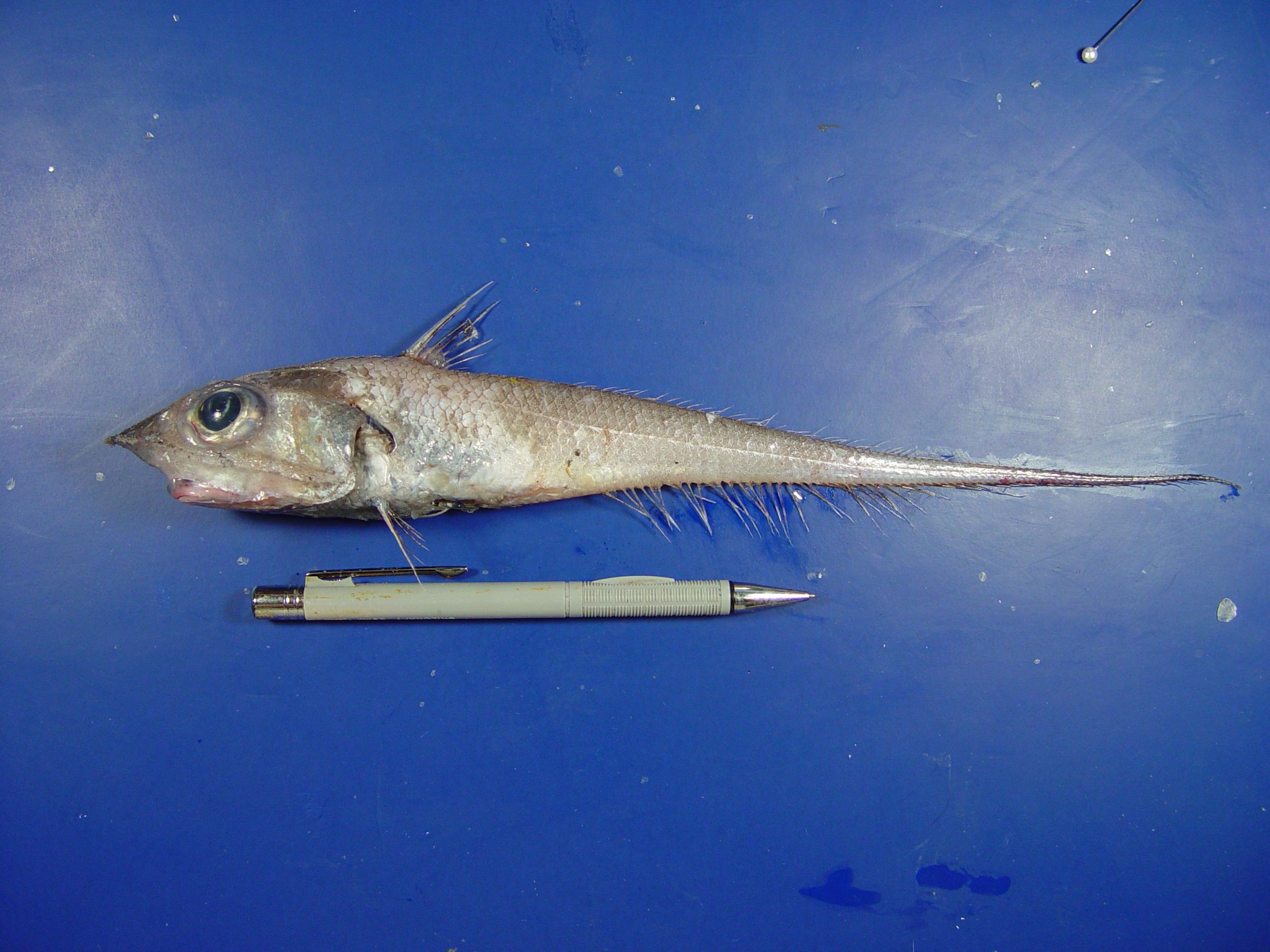
- Nezumia cyrano

Scientific classification
- Kingdom: Animalia
- Phylum: Chordata
- Class: Actinopterygii
- Division: Teleostei
- Order: Gadiformes
- Family: Macrouridae
- Genus: Nezumia; Jordan, 1904

Type species
- Nezumia condylura Jordan & Gilbert, 1904

Synonyms
- Macruroplus Bleeker, 1874

= Nezumia =

Nezumia Temporal range: 15.9–0 Ma Middle Miocene to Present

Genus of fishes

Nezumia is a genus of rattails. The generic name derives from the Japanese 鼠 (nezumi), meaning "mouse".

While many classification have been made through fished specimen ROVs image are becoming available.

== Species ==
There are currently 53 recognized species in this genus:

- Nezumia aequalis (Günther, 1878) (Common Atlantic grenadier)
- Nezumia africana (Iwamoto, 1970)
- Nezumia aspidentata Iwamoto & Merrett, 1997
- Nezumia atlantica (A. E. Parr, 1946) (Western Atlantic grenadier)
- Nezumia bairdii (Goode & T. H. Bean, 1877) (Marlin-spike grenadier)
- Nezumia brevibarbata (Barnard, 1925) (Short-beard grenadier)
- Nezumia brevirostris (Alcock, 1889)
- Nezumia burragei (C. H. Gilbert, 1905)
- Nezumia cliveri Iwamoto & Merrett, 1997
- Nezumia coheni Iwamoto & Merrett, 1997 (Cohen's whiptail)
- Nezumia condylura D. S. Jordan & C. H. Gilbert, 1904 (Japanese pugnose grenadier)
- Nezumia convergens (Garman, 1899) (Peruvian grenadier)
- Nezumia cyrano N. B. Marshall & Iwamoto, 1973
- Nezumia darus (C. H. Gilbert & C. L. Hubbs, 1916)
- Nezumia duodecim Iwamoto, 1970 (Twelve-rayed grenadier)
- Nezumia ectenes (C. H. Gilbert & Cramer, 1897)
- Nezumia evides (C. H. Gilbert & C. L. Hubbs, 1920)
- Nezumia holocentra (C. H. Gilbert & Cramer, 1897)
- Nezumia infranudis (C. H. Gilbert & C. L. Hubbs, 1920)
- Nezumia investigatoris (Alcock, 1888)
- Nezumia kamoharai Okamura, 1970
- Nezumia kapala Iwamoto & A. Williams, 1999 (Kapala whiptail)
- Nezumia kensmithi R. R. Wilson, 2001 (Blunt-nosed whiptail)
- Nezumia latirostrata (Garman, 1899) (Broad-snout grenadier)
- Nezumia leucoura Iwamoto & A. Williams, 1999 (White-tail whiptail)
- Nezumia liolepis (C. H. Gilbert, 1890) (Smooth grenadier)
- Nezumia longebarbata (Roule & Angel, 1933) (Blunt-nose grenadier)
- Nezumia loricata (Garman, 1899) (Parrot grenadier)
- Nezumia merretti Iwamoto & A. Williams, 1999 (Merrett's whiptail)
- Nezumia micronychodon Iwamoto, 1970 (Small-tooth grenadier)
- Nezumia milleri Iwamoto, 1973 (Miller's grenadier)
- Nezumia namatahi McCann & D. G. McKnight, 1980 (Squashed-face rattail)
- Nezumia obliquata (C. H. Gilbert, 1905)
- Nezumia orbitalis (Garman, 1899) (Spectacled grenadier)
- Nezumia parini C. L. Hubbs & Iwamoto, 1977 (Parin's grenadier)
- Nezumia polylepis (Alcock, 1889)
- Nezumia propinqua (C. H. Gilbert & Cramer, 1897) (Aloha grenadier)
- Nezumia proxima (H. M. Smith & Radcliffe, 1912) (Short-tail grenadier)
- Nezumia pudens C. H. Gilbert & W. F. Thompson, 1916 (Atacama grenadier)
- Nezumia pulchella (Pequeño, 1971) (Thumb grenadier)
- Nezumia sclerorhynchus (Valenciennes, 1838) (Rough-tip grenadier)
- Nezumia semiquincunciata (Alcock, 1889)
- Nezumia shinoharai Nakayama & Endo, 2012
- Nezumia soela Iwamoto & A. Williams, 1999 (Soela whiptail)
- Nezumia spinosa (C. H. Gilbert & C. L. Hubbs, 1916) (Saw-spine whiptail)
- Nezumia stelgidolepis (C. H. Gilbert, 1890) (California grenadier)
- Nezumia suilla N. B. Marshall & Iwamoto, 1973
- Nezumia tinro Sazonov, 1985
- Nezumia toi McCann & D. G. McKnight, 1980
- Nezumia tomiyamai (Okamura, 1963)
- Nezumia umbracincta Iwamoto & M. E. Anderson, 1994
- Nezumia ventralis C. L. Hubbs & Iwamoto, 1979
- Nezumia wularnia Iwamoto & A. Williams, 1999 (Wularni whiptail)
