= Kuronezumia =

Scientific classification
- Domain: Eukaryota
- Kingdom: Animalia
- Phylum: Chordata
- Class: Actinopterygii
- Order: Gadiformes
- Family: Macrouridae
- Subfamily: Macrourinae
- Genus: Kuronezumia; Iwamoto, 1974

Type species
- Nezumia (Kuronezumia) bubonis Iwamoto 1974

Genus of fishes

Kuronezumia is a genus of rattails.

== Species ==
There are currently six recognized species in this genus:

- Kuronezumia bubonis (Iwamoto, 1974) (Bulbous rattail)
- Kuronezumia darus (C. H. Gilbert & C. L. Hubbs, 1916)
- Kuronezumia leonis (Barnard, 1925) (Snubnose whiptail)
- Kuronezumia macronema (H. M. Smith & Radcliffe, 1912)
- Kuronezumia paepkei Shcherbachev, Sazonov & Iwamoto, 1992
- Kuronezumia pallida Sazonov & Iwamoto, 1992 (Pallid whiptail)
