= Spicomacrurus =

Scientific classification
- Kingdom: Animalia
- Phylum: Chordata
- Class: Actinopterygii
- Order: Gadiformes
- Family: Macrouridae
- Genus: Spicomacrurus; Okamura, 1970

Type species
- Hymenocephalus kuronumai Kamohara, 1938

Genus of fishes

Spicomacrurus is a genus of rattails.

== Species ==
There are currently 4 recognized species in this genus:

- Spicomacrurus adelscotti (Iwamoto & Merrett, 1997) (Celebration whiptail)
- Spicomacrurus dictyogadus Iwamoto, K. T. Shao & H. C. Ho, 2011 (Net-throat grenadier)
- Spicomacrurus kuronumai (Kamohara, 1938) (Kuronuma's whiptail)
- Spicomacrurus mccoskeri Iwamoto, K. T. Shao & H. C. Ho, 2011 (McCosker's grenadier)
