= K. japonica =

K. japonica may refer to:

- Kadsura japonica, an ornamental plant species
- Kathablepharis japonica, a single-celled eukaryote species
- Kerria japonica, a deciduous shrub species native to eastern Asia, in China, Japan and Korea
- Kumba japonica, a rattail fish species found in the waters around Taiwan and southern Japan

== See also ==
- Japonica (disambiguation)
