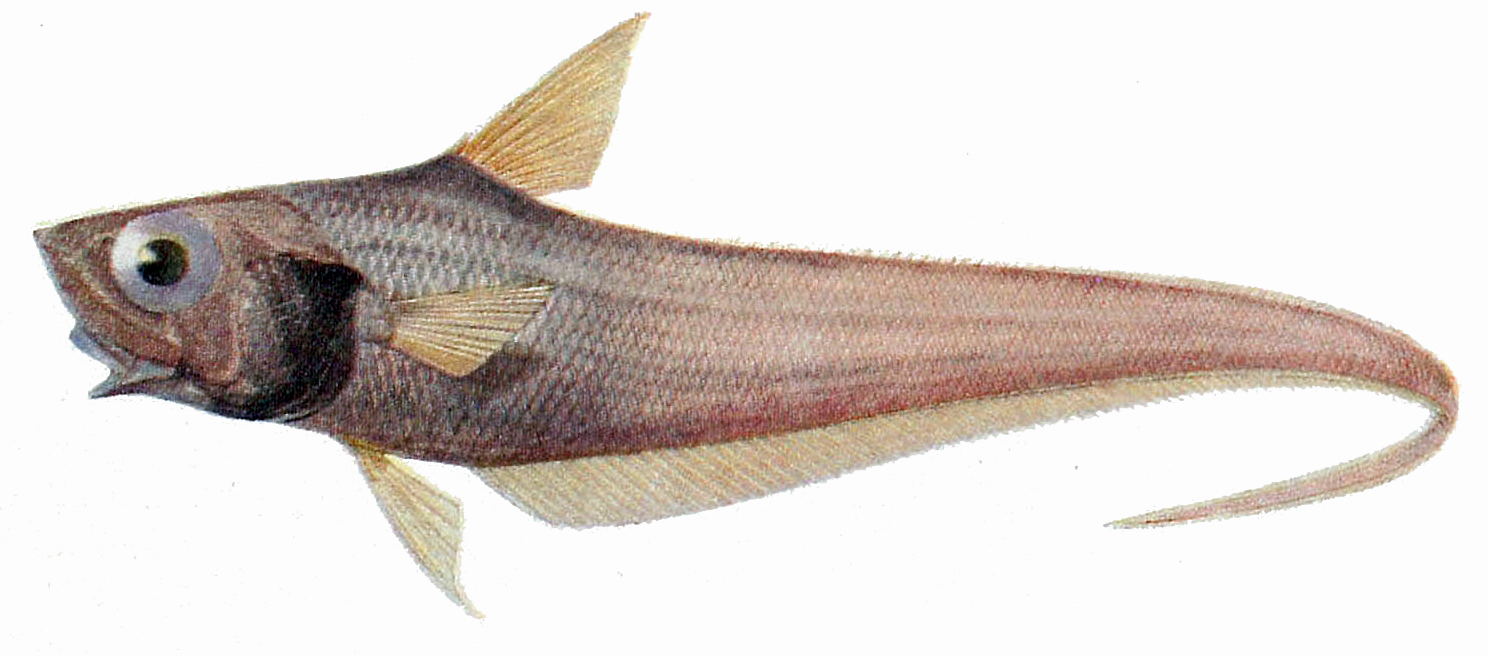

Conservation status
- Least Concern (IUCN 3.1)

Scientific classification
- Domain: Eukaryota
- Kingdom: Animalia
- Phylum: Chordata
- Class: Actinopterygii
- Order: Gadiformes
- Family: Macrouridae
- Genus: Nezumia
- Species: N. aequalis

Binomial name
- Nezumia aequalis (Günther, 1878)

Synonyms
- Coryphaenoides aequalis Günther, 1878; Coryphaenoides serratus Lowe, 1843; Lionurus aequalis Günther, 1878; Macrourus serratus Lowe, 1843; Macruroplus serratus Lowe, 1843; Macrurus aequalis Günther, 1878; Macrurus serratus Lowe, 1843; Macrurus smiliophorus Vaillant, 1888; Nezumia hildebrandi Parr, 1946

= Common Atlantic grenadier =

Species of fish

The common Atlantic grenadier (Nezumia aequalis) is a species of fish in the family Macrouridae.

== Description ==
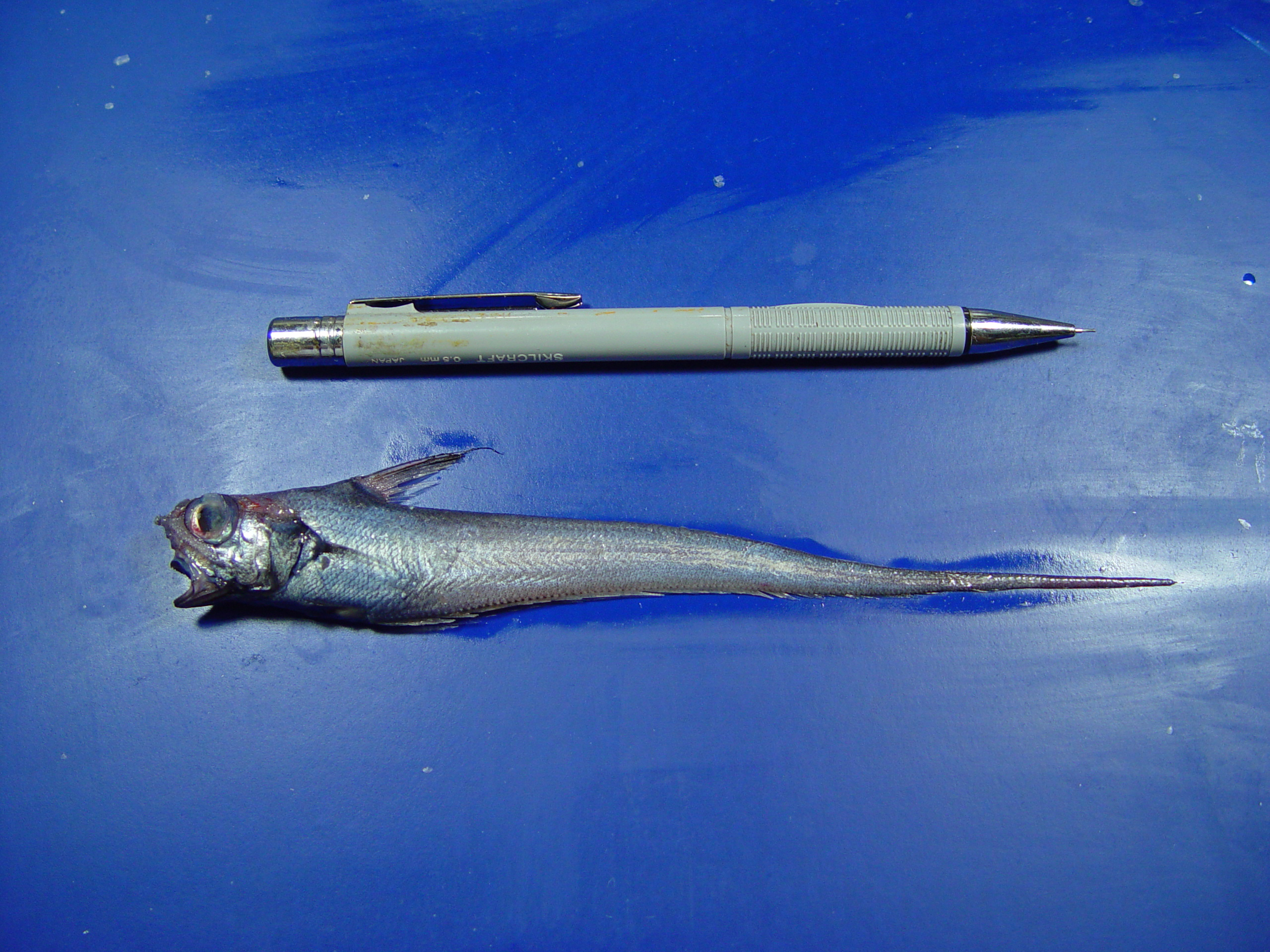
Nezumia aequalis next to a ballpoint pen

The common Atlantic grenadier is blue-violet in colour, with silvery and black areas. Its maximum length is 36 centimetres (14 in). It has 2 dorsal spines and its spinules are lanceolate or shield-shaped. Its head, snout and chin barbel are short.

== Habitat ==
The common Atlantic grenadier lives in the Atlantic Ocean; it is benthopelagic, living at depths of 200–2,320 m (660–7,610 ft).

== Behaviour ==
The common Atlantic grenadier feeds on mysids, amphipods, small shrimps, copepods, isopods, ostracods and polychaete worms.
