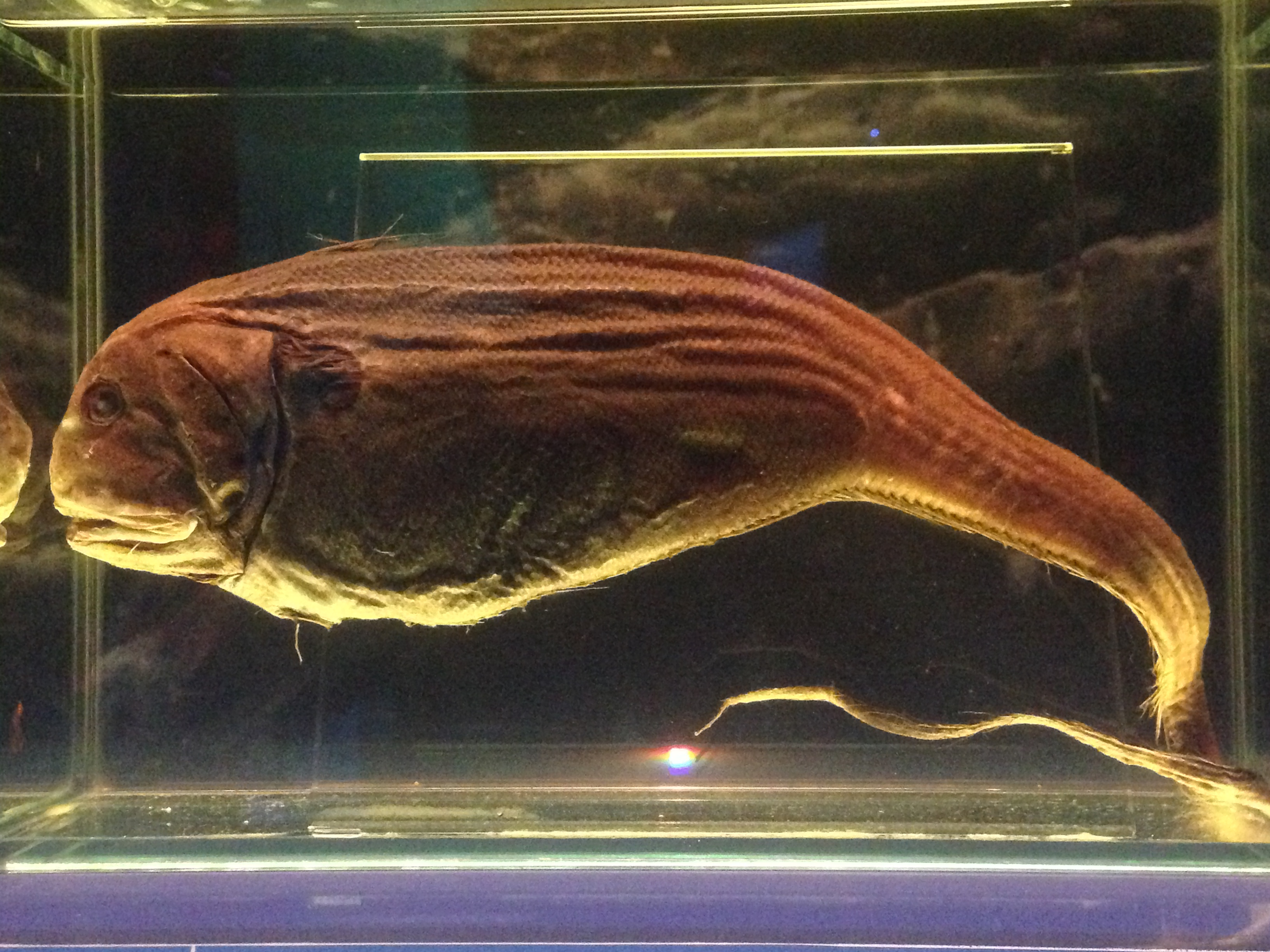
- Preserved specimen of Odontomacrurus murrayi

Conservation status
- Least Concern (IUCN 3.1)

Scientific classification
- Kingdom: Animalia
- Phylum: Chordata
- Class: Actinopterygii
- Division: Teleostei
- Order: Gadiformes
- Suborder: Macrouroidei
- Family: Macrouridae
- Genus: Odontomacrurus; Norman, 1939
- Species: O. murrayi

Binomial name
- Odontomacrurus murrayi Norman, 1939

= Odontomacrurus =

Species of fish

Odontomacrurus murrayi, the roundhead grenadier, is a bathypelagic or mesopelagic species of rattail. The fish is widespread in the mid-waters of the eastern Atlantic Ocean from north of the Azores to South Africa. It also occurs in the Indian Ocean and in the southwest Pacific. This species grows to a length of 64 centimetres (25 in) TL. The remains of fish have been sampled from the stomach contents of specimens. This species is the only member of its genus.
