= Pseudonezumia =

Scientific classification
- Kingdom: Animalia
- Phylum: Chordata
- Class: Actinopterygii
- Order: Gadiformes
- Family: Macrouridae
- Genus: Pseudonezumia; Okamura, 1970

Type species
- Pseudonezumia japonicus Okamura 1970

Synonyms
- Echinomacrurus Roule, 1916

Genus of fishes

Pseudonezumia is a genus of rattails. The generic name means "false Nezumia".

== Species ==
There are currently five recognized species in this genus:

- Pseudonezumia cetonuropsis (C. H. Gilbert & C. L. Hubbs, 1916)
- Pseudonezumia japonica Okamura, 1970
- Pseudonezumia japonicus Okamura, 1970
- Pseudonezumia parvipes (H. M. Smith & Radcliffe, 1912)
- Pseudonezumia pusilla (Sazonov & Shcherbachev, 1982) (Tiny whiptail)
