= Paracetonurus flagellicauda =

Conservation status
- Data Deficient (IUCN 3.1)

Scientific classification
- Kingdom: Animalia
- Phylum: Chordata
- Class: Actinopterygii
- Order: Gadiformes
- Family: Macrouridae
- Genus: Paracetonurus; Marshall, 1973
- Species: P. flagellicauda

Binomial name
- Paracetonurus flagellicauda (Koefoed, 1927)

Synonyms
- Grenurus flagellicauda Koefoed, 1927; Macrourus flagellicauda Koefoed, 1927; Macrurus flagellicauda Koefoed, 1927; Pseudonezumia flagellicauda Koefoed, 1927

Species of fish

Paracetonurus flagellicauda is a species of fish in the subfamily Macrourinae (grenadiers or rattails). Some sources place it in the genus Pseudonezumia.

== Description ==
Paracetonurus flagellicauda has a slender body, tapering to a string-like tail (hence its specific name flagellicauda, "whip-tail"). It is white with black markings. Its length is maximum 39.3 cm (15.5 in).

== Habitat ==
Paracetonurus flagellicauda lives in the northeast Atlantic Ocean and southwest Indian Ocean, and is common in the Azores. It is bathydemersal, living at 2,250–4,500 m (7,380–14,760 ft). The species may migrate along the mid-ocean ridges to travel between oceans.
