= Lucigadus lucifer =

Scientific classification
- Domain: Eukaryota
- Kingdom: Animalia
- Phylum: Chordata
- Class: Actinopterygii
- Order: Gadiformes
- Family: Macrouridae
- Subfamily: Macrourinae
- Genus: Lucigadus
- Species: L. lucifer

Binomial name
- Lucigadus lucifer H. M. Smith & Radcliffe, 1912

Species of fish

Lucigadus lucifer is a species of rattail. It is found at depths of up to 320 m in the waters around the Philippines and northern Taiwan.

This is a very small rattail (up to 11 cm in length) and is highly unusual and distinctive in shape. All the ventral parts of the body appear to have "shifted forward" so that the pelvic fins are located just below the gill openings and the origin of the long anal fin is just behind the head. An additional diagnostic feature is its rounded, plainly coloured snout.
