= Cetonurichthys =

Scientific classification
- Kingdom: Animalia
- Phylum: Chordata
- Class: Actinopterygii
- Division: Teleostei
- Order: Gadiformes
- Suborder: Macrouroidei
- Family: Macrouridae
- Genus: Cetonurichthys; Sazonov & Shcherbachev, 1982
- Species: C. subinflatus

Binomial name
- Cetonurichthys subinflatus Sazonov & Shcherbachev, 1982

Species of fish

Cetonurichthys subinflatus, the smallpore whiptail, is a species of rattail found off western Australia. It is a benthic fish which occurs at depths of 1,316 to 1,700 m (4,318 to 5,577 ft) on the continental slope. This species grows to a length of 40 cm (16 in).
