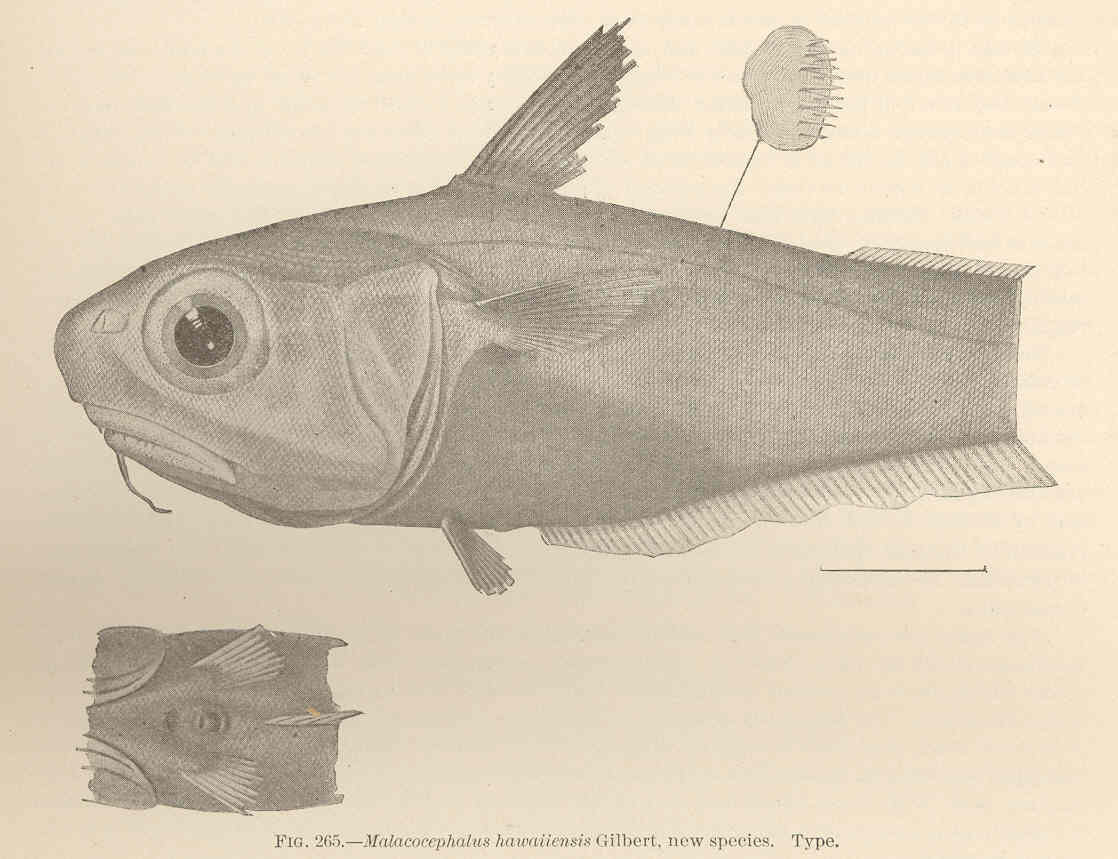
- Malacocephalus hawaiiensis

Scientific classification
- Kingdom: Animalia
- Phylum: Chordata
- Class: Actinopterygii
- Order: Gadiformes
- Family: Macrouridae
- Genus: Malacocephalus; Günther, 1862

Type species
- Macrourus laevis Lowe, 1843

Synonyms
- Pawnurus Parr, 1946

= Malacocephalus =

Genus of fishes

Malacocephalus is a genus of rattails.

== Species ==
There are currently seven recognized species in this genus:

- Malacocephalus boretzi Sazonov, 1985
- Malacocephalus hawaiiensis C. H. Gilbert, 1905 (Hawaiian softhead grenadier)
- Malacocephalus laevis (R. T. Lowe, 1843) (Softhead grenadier)
- Malacocephalus luzonensis C. H. Gilbert & C. L. Hubbs, 1920
- Malacocephalus nipponensis C. H. Gilbert & C. L. Hubbs, 1916
- Malacocephalus occidentalis Goode & T. H. Bean, 1885 (Western softhead grenadier)
- Malacocephalus okamurai Iwamoto & T. Arai, 1987
