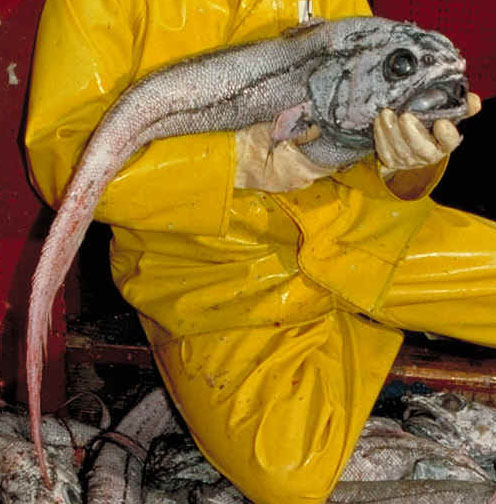

Scientific classification
- Kingdom: Animalia
- Phylum: Chordata
- Class: Actinopterygii
- Order: Gadiformes
- Suborder: Macrouroidei
- Family: Macrouridae
- Genus: Albatrossia; Jordan & Gilbert, 1898
- Species: A. pectoralis

Binomial name
- Albatrossia pectoralis (Gilbert, 1892)

Synonyms
- Macrurus pectoralis Gilbert, 1892; Chalinura pectoralis (Gilbert, 1892); Coryphaenoides pectoralis (Gilbert, 1892); Dolloa pectoralis (Gilbert, 1892); Nematonurus pectoralis (Gilbert, 1892); Macrurus magnus Gill & Townsend, 1897

= Albatrossia =

Giant grenadier

Genus of fishes

Albatrossia pectoralis, the giant grenadier or giant rattail, is a very large rattail, and the only member of the genus Albatrossia. It is found in the north Pacific from northern Japan to the Okhotsk and Bering Seas, east to the Gulf of Alaska, and south to northern Baja California in Mexico. It is found at depths between 140 and at least 4,250 m, but typically between 700 and 1100 m. The giant grenadier has the usual greatly elongated, pointed tail of the rattails.

== Ecology ==
Giant grenadiers are among the most abundant species from 400–1,000 m in the North Pacific Ocean. Giant grenadiers are apex predators on the upper continental slopes of the northern Pacific. Their main prey are Octopoteuthis deletron squid and Vampyroteuthis infernalis vampire squid.

== Description ==
Giant grenadier can grow to 2.1 m (6 ft 11 in) total length.

=== Otoliths ===
Giant grenadier have two otolith shapes that have been observed to date, and there is a third shape that seems to be a mixture of the two distinct shapes.

== Fishery ==
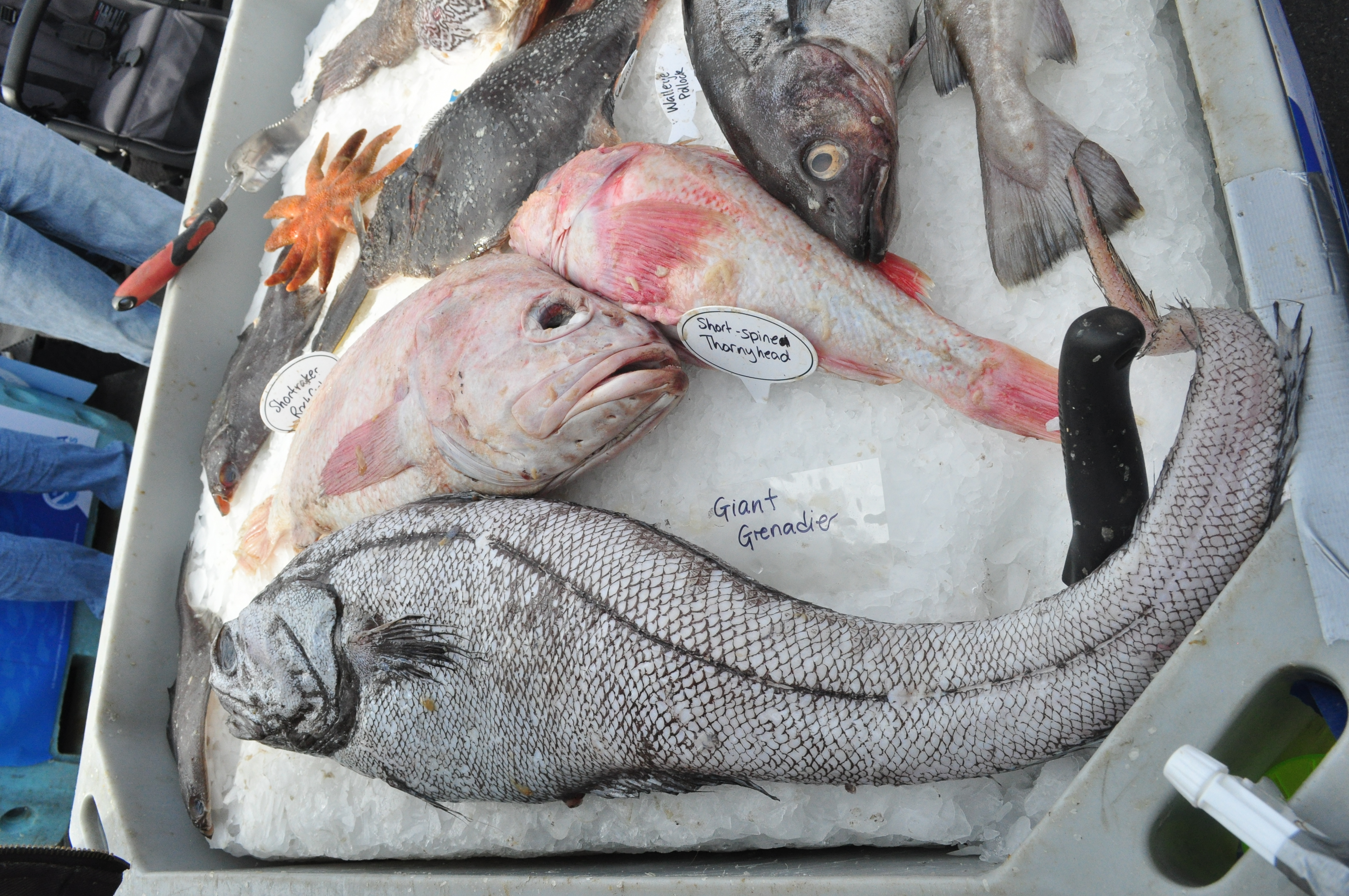
Seattle

Giant grenadier are of low commercial value but are caught as by-catch. Because of their great abundance, several attempts have been made to develop a fishery for giant grenadier. However, the fish is categorized as "unpalatable" because of its soft texture, high moisture content, and low protein content.
