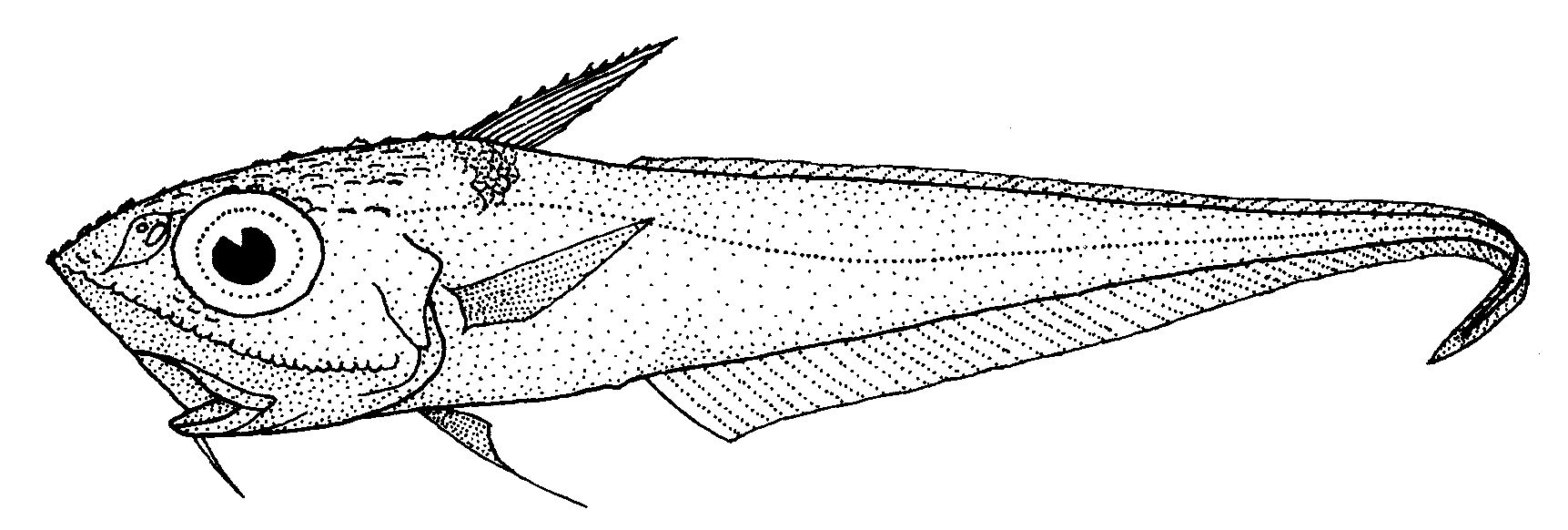
- Drawing by Dr Tony Ayling

Scientific classification
- Domain: Eukaryota
- Kingdom: Animalia
- Phylum: Chordata
- Class: Actinopterygii
- Order: Gadiformes
- Family: Macrouridae
- Subfamily: Macrourinae
- Genus: Macrourus
- Species: M. carinatus

Binomial name
- Macrourus carinatus (Günther, 1878)

Synonyms
- Coryphaenoides carinatus Günther, 1878; Macrurus carinatus (Günther, 1878)

= Ridge scaled rattail =

Species of fish

The ridge scaled rattail or ridge-scaled grenadier, Macrourus carinatus, is a species of deep-water fish in the family Macrouridae. It has southern circumglobal distribution in temperate to subantarctic waters (34°S–65°S) and is found in the Southern Atlantic, Indian and Pacific Oceans and in the Southern Ocean at depths of about 200–1,200 m (660–3,940 ft).

== Description and life history ==
Macrourus carinatus can reach 1 m (3 ft 3 in) in total length and about 36 cm (14 in) in pre-anal length. The eyes are relatively large. The snout is short and moderately pointed. Coloration is medium brown to somewhat straw color, with darker, sometimes even blackish fins.

In the waters of the Falkland Islands, females reach 50% maturity at 21 cm (8.3 in) pre-anal length and 14 years of age. Males reach 50% maturity at 16 cm (6.3 in) pre-anal length and 12 years of age. Spawning occurs throughout the year but peaks during the austral autumn (April–July). Females also have a larger asymptotic pre-anal length than males, 31 and 25 cm (12.2 and 9.8 in), respectively. Maximum recorded age is 53 years.

== Fisheries ==
Macrourus carinatus population is currently at risk due to overfishing and slow reproduction rate. Its slow reproduction rate similar to many other deep-sea animals, can take from 10-15 years to grow to reproductive age. During this 15 year span it faces predation by bigger species, along with the harsh conditions of the deep sea.

Macrourus carinatus is a commercial fishery species. Targeted fishery along the Patagonian continental slope reached a peak of 50,000 tonnes in 1988 but declined precipitously thereafter. At present, it is treated as a by-catch species that is not allowed to exceed 10% of daily catches in weight.
