= Mesovagus =

Scientific classification
- Kingdom: Animalia
- Phylum: Chordata
- Class: Actinopterygii
- Order: Gadiformes
- Family: Macrouridae
- Genus: Mesovagus; Nakayama & Endo, 2016

Type species
- Mesobius berryi Hubbs & Iwamoto 1977

Synonyms
- Mesobius Hubbs & Iwamoto, 1977 (homonym)

Genus of fishes

Mesovagus is a genus of rattails found in Indian and Pacific Ocean.

== Species ==
There are currently 2 recognized species in this genus:

- Mesovagus antipodum (C. L. Hubbs & Iwamoto, 1977) (Bathypelagic rattail)
- Mesovagus berryi (C. L. Hubbs & Iwamoto, 1977) (Berry's grenadier)
