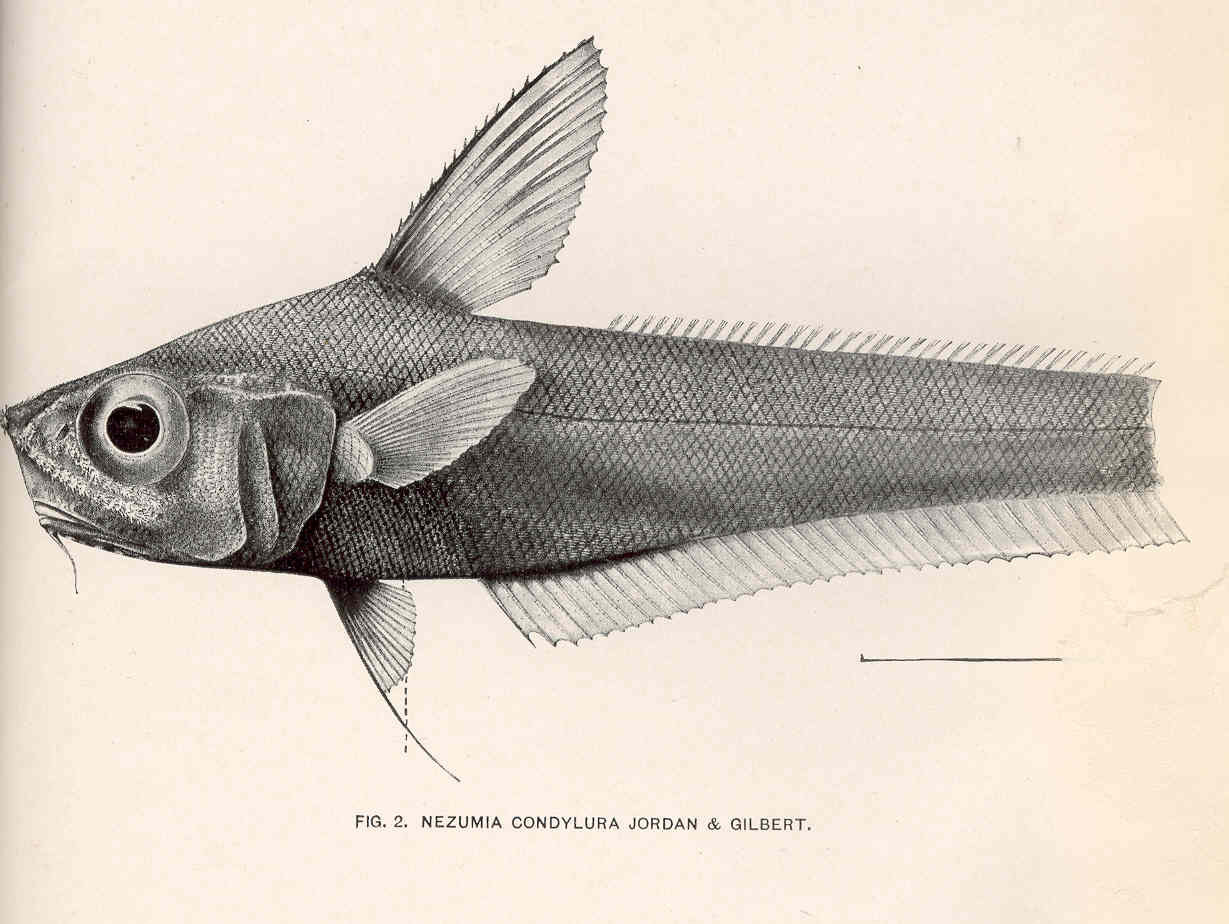

Scientific classification
- Domain: Eukaryota
- Kingdom: Animalia
- Phylum: Chordata
- Class: Actinopterygii
- Order: Gadiformes
- Family: Macrouridae
- Subfamily: Macrourinae
- Genus: Nezumia
- Species: N. condylura

Binomial name
- Nezumia condylura Jordan & Gilbert, 1904

Synonyms
- Lionurus condylura (Jordan & Gilbert, 1904)

= Japanese pugnose grenadier =

Species of fish

The Japanese pugnose grenadier (Nezumia condylura) is a species of rattail fish. It is found at depths of up to 720 m (2362 ft) in the waters around southern Japan, northern Taiwan and in the East China Sea.

As the common name suggests, this fish has a very short, blunt snout. It is greyish-brown overall but with a bluish tinge on the abdomen. The margins of the mouth and gills are blackish and the fins are dark. The first dorsal fin has blackish margins and has two spines.
