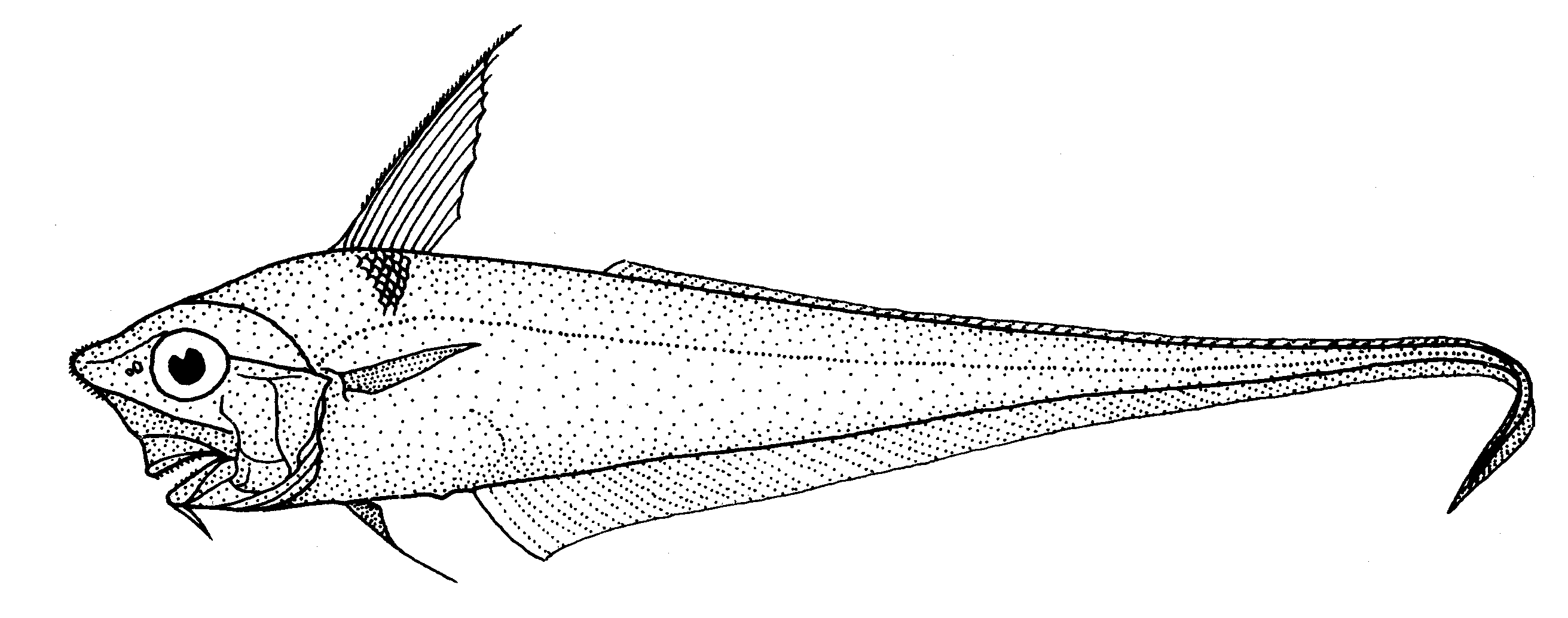
- Drawing by Dr Tony Ayling

Scientific classification
- Domain: Eukaryota
- Kingdom: Animalia
- Phylum: Chordata
- Class: Actinopterygii
- Order: Gadiformes
- Family: Macrouridae
- Subfamily: Macrourinae
- Genus: Nezumia
- Species: N. namatahi

Binomial name
- Nezumia namatahi McCann & McKnight, 1980

= Squashed face rattail =

Species of fish

The squashed face rattail (Nezumia namatahi) is a rattail of the genus Nezumia, found around New South Wales, Australia, and New Zealand, at depths of between 1,250 and 1,300 m. Its length is about 35 cm.

In the month-long NORFANZ Expedition of 2003 which was examining the biodiversity of the seamounts and slopes of the Norfolk Ridge, 17 specimens averaging 110 g (0.25 lb), were collected from 10 locations.
