= Ventrifossa rhipidodorsalis =

Scientific classification
- Kingdom: Animalia
- Phylum: Chordata
- Class: Actinopterygii
- Order: Gadiformes
- Family: Macrouridae
- Genus: Ventrifossa
- Species: V. rhipidodorsalis

Binomial name
- Ventrifossa rhipidodorsalis Okamura, 1984

Species of fish

Ventrifossa rhipidodorsalis is a species of rattail. This is a deep-water fish found at depths of up to 535 m. It is found in waters off southern Japan, northeastern Taiwan, the Philippines, and in the South China Sea.

This species reaches a length of up to 21 cm. It can be distinguished from its congeners by the patterning of the fins: the first dorsal fin is mostly black with white at the base and tip, while the elongated anal fin has a black margin towards the front. There is a large bioluminescent organ located between the bases of the pelvic fins.
