= Haplomacrourus =

Scientific classification
- Kingdom: Animalia
- Phylum: Chordata
- Class: Actinopterygii
- Order: Gadiformes
- Suborder: Macrouroidei
- Family: Macrouridae
- Genus: Haplomacrourus; Trunov, 1980
- Species: H. nudirostris

Binomial name
- Haplomacrourus nudirostris Trunov, 1980

Genus of fishes

Haplomacrourus nudirostris, the naked snout rattail, is a benthic species of rattail found in the southern oceans where it occurs on the continental slopes at depths of from 690 to 1,590 metres (2,260 to 5,220 ft) This species grows to a length of 57.5 centimetres (22.6 in) TL. It is the only species in the genus Haplomacrourus.
