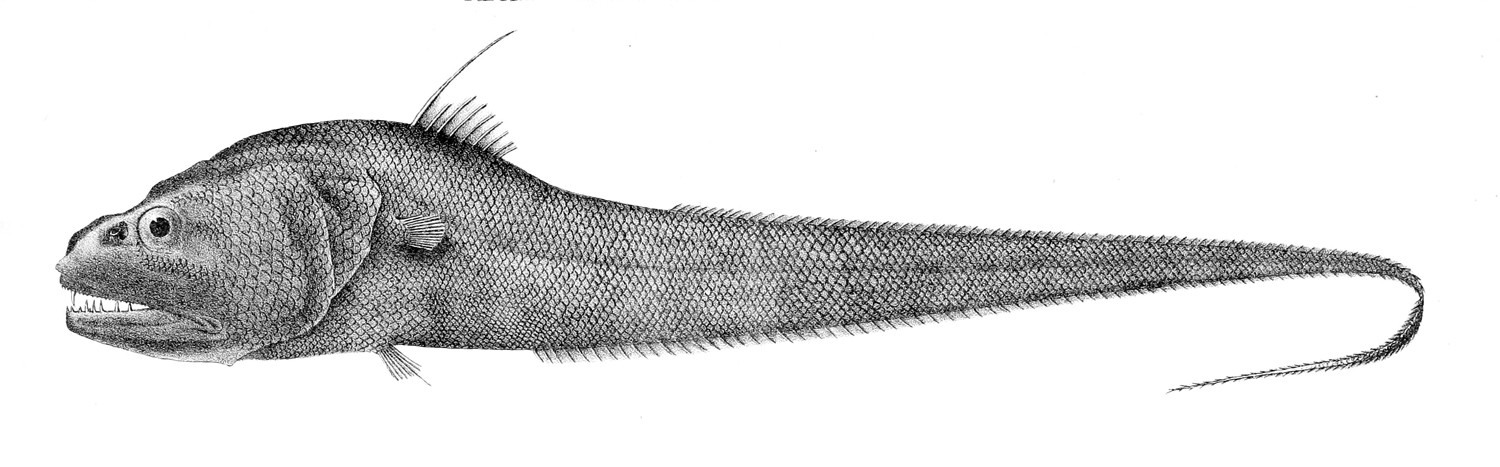
- A. H. Searle's engraving of the holotype

Scientific classification
- Kingdom: Animalia
- Phylum: Chordata
- Class: Actinopterygii
- Division: Teleostei
- Order: Gadiformes
- Suborder: Macrouroidei
- Family: Macrouridae
- Genus: Cynomacrurus; Dollo, 1909
- Species: C. piriei

Binomial name
- Cynomacrurus piriei Dollo, 1909

= Cynomacrurus =

Species of fish

Cynomacrurus piriei, the dogtooth grenadier, is a species of rattail that occurs in the southern oceans, mostly south of the Antarctic Convergence. This fish is found at depths of from 500 to 3,800 metres (1,600 to 12,500 ft). This species grows to a length of 50 centimetres (20 in) TL.

In 1909, Louis Dollo paper describing this species and circumscribing its monospecific genus Cynomacrurus was published. The species's type locality is in the Weddell Sea at 71°50′S 23°30′W. The holotype was collected by the Scotia during the Scottish National Antarctic Expedition on 15 March 1904; it was later deposited in the Scottish Oceanographical Laboratory. The specific epithet was named in honor of Harvey Pirie, who was the surgeon, geologist, and bacteriologist aboard the Scotia.
