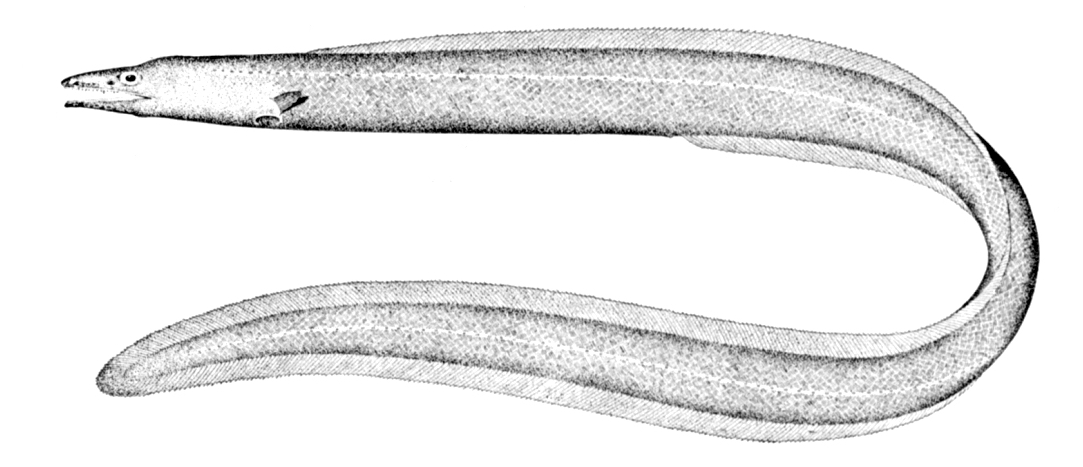
- Ilyophis brunneus

Scientific classification
- Kingdom: Animalia
- Phylum: Chordata
- Class: Actinopterygii
- Order: Anguilliformes
- Family: Synaphobranchidae
- Subfamily: Ilyophinae
- Genus: Ilyophis; Gilbert, 1891

Type species
- Ilyophis brunneus Gilbert, 1891

Species
- See text

= Ilyophis =

Genus of fishes

Ilyophis is a genus of marine ray-finned fishes belonging to the family Synaphobranchidae, the cutthroat eels. These eels are found in the Atlantic, Indian and Pacific Oceans.

== Species ==
There are currently eight recognized species in this genus:

- Ilyophis arx C. H. Robins, 1976
- Ilyophis blachei Saldanha & Merrett, 1982
- Ilyophis brunneus Gilbert, 1891
- Ilyophis maclainei Tighe, D. G. Smith & Merrett, 2024
- Ilyophis nigeli Shcherbachev & Sulak, 1997
- Ilyophis robinsae Sulak & Shcherbachev, 1997
- Ilyophis saldanhai Karmovskaya & Parin, 1999
- Ilyophis singularis Tashiro & W.-J. Chen, 2022
