= Mataeocephalus =

Scientific classification
- Domain: Eukaryota
- Kingdom: Animalia
- Phylum: Chordata
- Class: Actinopterygii
- Order: Gadiformes
- Family: Macrouridae
- Subfamily: Macrourinae
- Genus: Mataeocephalus; C. Berg (es), 1898

Type species
- Coelocephalus acipenserinus Gilbert & Cramer, 1897

Synonyms
- Coelocephalus Gilbert & Cramer, 1897; Hyomacrurus Gilbert & Hubbs, 1920; Hyostomus Jordan, 1920

Genus of fishes

Mataeocephalus is a genus of rattails.

== Species ==
There are currently six recognized species in this genus:

- Mataeocephalus acipenserinus (Gilbert & Cramer, 1897) (Sturgeon grenadier)
- Mataeocephalus adustus H. M. Smith & Radcliffe, 1912
- Mataeocephalus cristatus Sazonov, Shcherbachev & Iwamoto, 2003
- Mataeocephalus hyostomus (H. M. Smith & Radcliffe, 1912)
- Mataeocephalus kotlyari Sazonov, Shcherbachev & Iwamoto, 2003 (Kotlyar's whiptail)
- Mataeocephalus tenuicauda (Garman, 1899) (Slendertail grenadier)
