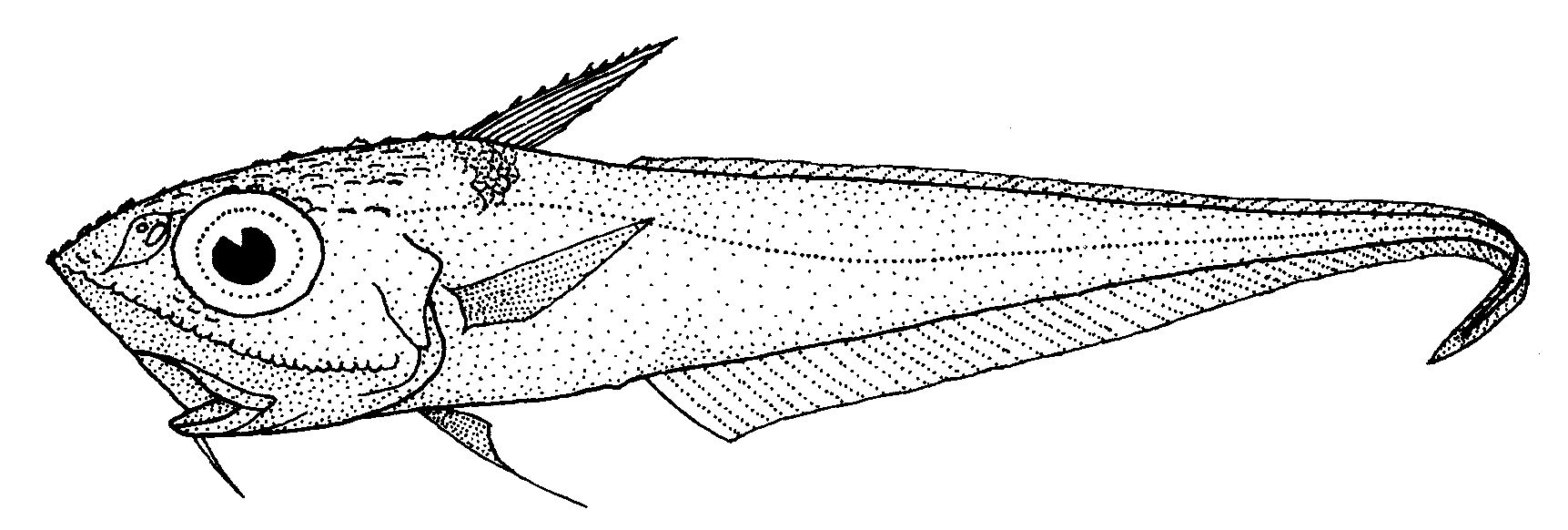
- Ridge scaled rattail, Macrourus carinatus

Scientific classification
- Kingdom: Animalia
- Phylum: Chordata
- Class: Actinopterygii
- Order: Gadiformes
- Family: Macrouridae
- Genus: Macrourus; Bloch, 1786

Type species
- see text

Species
- See text

= Macrourus =

Genus of fishes

Macrourus is a small benthopelagic genus of rattails from the family Macrouridae.

== General features ==
The species in the genus Macrourus have large broad heads which are over four times as deep as they are long with a snout which varies from rounded to bluntly pointed, with a substantial modified spiny scale at its tip. They have a strong, suborbital ridge that extends onto preopercle and ends with a sharp point. The eyes have a diameter of around one third of the length of the head. They have small teeth which are set in in moderate to broad bands in the premaxilla which taper posteriorly and ending well short of the ends of the lips; the mandibular band is either 3 or 4 teeth wide at the symphysis, narrowing to 1 row posteriorly and extending to about the end of the lips. They have a serrated spiny dorsal fin ray; the pelvic fin usually has 8 or 9 rays. The anus is at the anal fin, there is no photophore. Their maximum size is probably around 100 centimeters (39 inches).

== Habitat, distribution and biology ==
The species of Macrourus are found on the upper- to middle continental slope which are restricted to cold temperate and polar waters in both the North and South Atlantic as well as in the Southern Ocean. They are found at depths from around 200 meters (660 feet) to greater than 3,000 meters (9,800 feet). They normally prefer temperatures of between 1 and 4 °C (34 and 39 °F), although one species, the Antarctic roughhead (Macrourus whitsoni), has been collected at temperatures which were slightly below 0 °C (32 °F).

== Fisheries ==
Macrourus species are important food fishes in the North Atlantic and off the Patagonian coast of Argentina. They are normally considered as bycatch in the north eastern Atlantic but they are landed and the weight of catches landed between 1990 and 2015 varied from almost none to 4,000 tonnes.

== Taxonomy and species ==
There is a controversy about the identification of the type species of this genus; Macrourus rupestris was named as the type species by Bloch but this name is a synonym of Coryphaenoides rupestris. In 1917 Jordan proposed that Macrourus berglax be designated the type species, but this also lacks clarity as Sundevall was of the view that the fish named as berglax by Gunnerus was in fact C. rupestris and that M. berglax should be named M. fabricii. This is still to be resolved by the ICZN.

There are currently five recognized species in this genus:

- Macrourus berglax Lacépède, 1801 (Roughhead grenadier)
- Macrourus caml P. J. McMillan, Iwamoto, A. L. Stewart & P. J. Smith, 2012 (Caml grenadier)
- Macrourus carinatus (Günther, 1878) (Ridge scaled rattail)
- Macrourus holotrachys Günther, 1878 (Bigeye grenadier)
- Macrourus whitsoni (Regan, 1913) (Whitson's grenadier)
