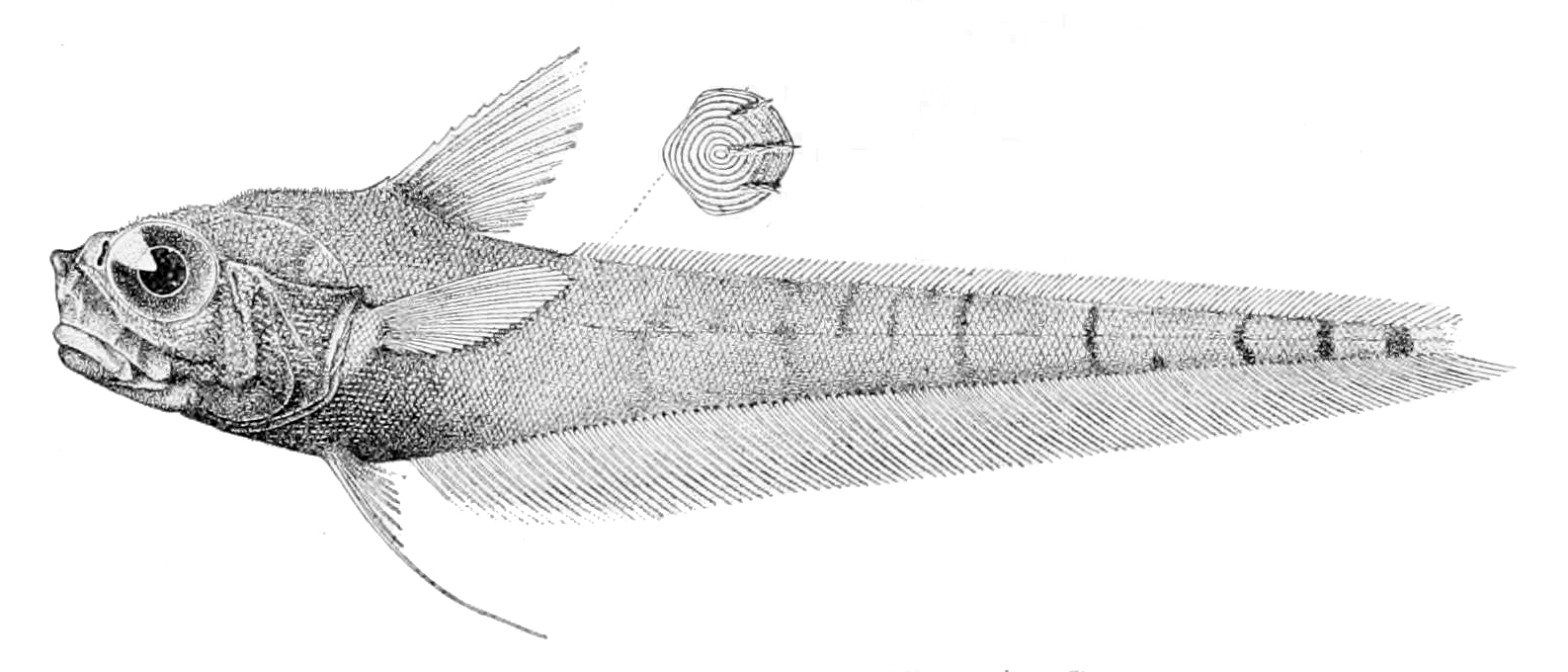
- K. hebetata

Scientific classification
- Domain: Eukaryota
- Kingdom: Animalia
- Phylum: Chordata
- Class: Actinopterygii
- Order: Gadiformes
- Family: Macrouridae
- Subfamily: Macrourinae
- Genus: Kumba; N. B. Marshall, 1973

Type species
- Kumba dentoni Marshall, 1973

Species
- See text.

Synonyms
- Parakumba Trunoc, 1981

= Kumba (fish) =

Genus of fishes

Kumba is a genus of rattails.

== Species ==
There are currently eight recognized species in this genus:

- Kumba calvifrons Iwamoto & Sazonov, 1994
- Kumba dentoni N. B. Marshall, 1973
- Kumba gymnorhynchus Iwamoto & Sazonov, 1994
- Kumba hebetata (C. H. Gilbert, 1905)
- Kumba japonica (Matsubara, 1943)
- Kumba maculisquama (Trunov, 1981)
- Kumba musorstom Merrett & Iwamoto, 2000
- Kumba punctulata Iwamoto & Sazonov, 1994
