= Ilyophis robinsae =

Scientific classification
- Domain: Eukaryota
- Kingdom: Animalia
- Phylum: Chordata
- Class: Actinopterygii
- Order: Anguilliformes
- Family: Synaphobranchidae
- Genus: Ilyophis
- Species: I. robinsae

Binomial name
- Ilyophis robinsae Sulak & Shcherbachev, 1997

Species of fish

Ilyophis robinsae is an eel in the family Synaphobranchidae (cutthroat eels). It was described by Yuri Nikolaevich Shcherbachev and Kenneth J. Sulak in 1997. It is a marine, deep water-dwelling eel which is known from the Philippines, in the Indo-West Pacific. It is known to dwell at depths of 2,087 metres (6,847 ft) to 6,068 metres (19,908 ft), and is the deepest known synaphobranchid. Lower abyssal and upper hadal records of I. robinsae are from the southwest Pacific trenches of Kermadec and New Hebrides. Males can reach a maximum total length of 34.8 centimetres (13.7 in).

The species epithet "robinsae" was given in honour of Catherine Robins, credited with making substantial contributions to the knowledge of the family Synaphobranchidae.
