= Ilyophis saldanhai =

Scientific classification
- Kingdom: Animalia
- Phylum: Chordata
- Class: Actinopterygii
- Order: Anguilliformes
- Family: Synaphobranchidae
- Genus: Ilyophis
- Species: I. saldanhai

Binomial name
- Ilyophis saldanhai Karmovskaya & Parin, 1999

Species of fish

Ilyophis saldanhai is an eel in the family Synaphobranchidae (cutthroat eels). It was described by Emma Stanislavovna Karmovskaya and Nikolai Vasilyevich Parin in 1999, and is the most recently described of the six species in the genus Ilyophis. It is a marine, deep water-dwelling eel which is known from the western central Atlantic Ocean. It is known to dwell at a depth of 3,020 metres (9,910 ft).
