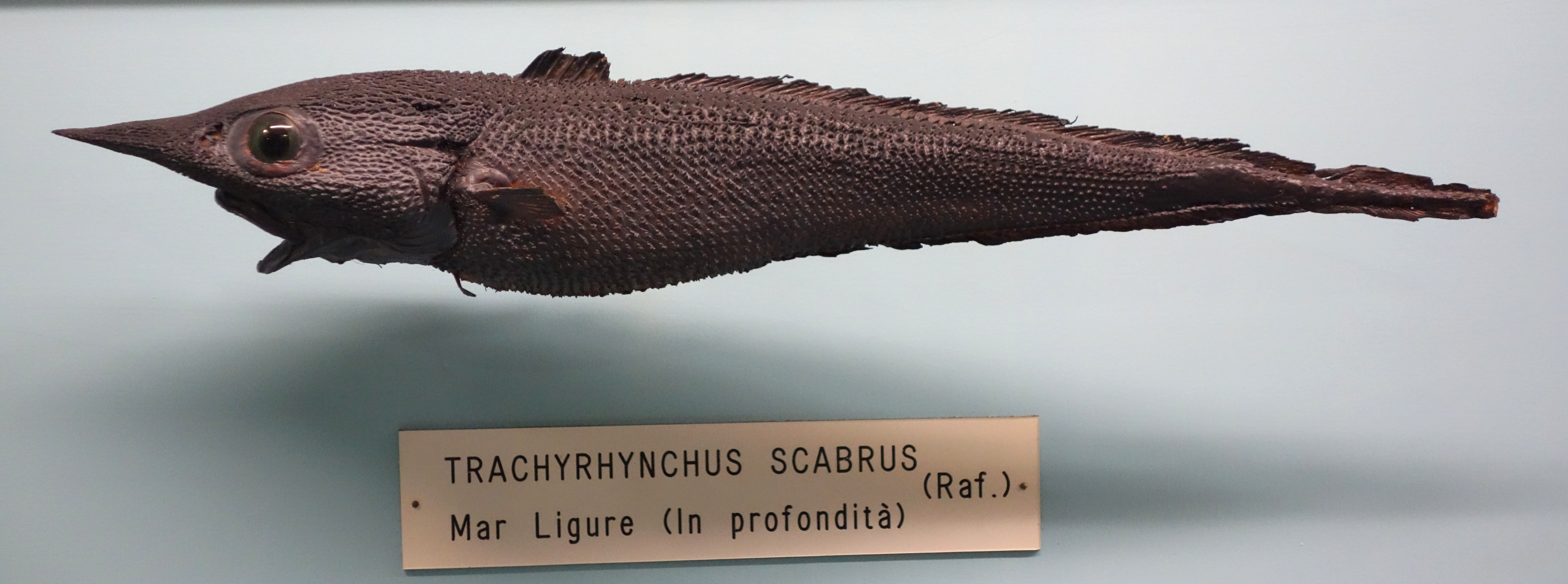
- Trachyrincus scabrus

Scientific classification
- Kingdom: Animalia
- Phylum: Chordata
- Class: Actinopterygii
- Order: Gadiformes
- Suborder: Macrouroidei
- Family: Trachyrincidae; Goode & Bean, 1896

Genera
- Idiolophorhynchus Sazonov, 1981; Macrouroides Smith & Radcliffe, 1912; Trachyrincus Giorna, 1809; Squalogadus Gilbert & Hubbs 1916

= Trachyrincidae =

Subfamily of fishes

Trachyrincidae is a family of gadiform fish. The subfamily contains four genera found in Atlantic, Indian and Pacific Ocean. These species live in deep-water. These fishes have a long, narrow and sharply pointed snout. The chin barbel is present. Two genera (Macrouroides and Squalogadus) have a huge and rounded head with the consistency of a water-filled balloon. The eyes are tiny. The chin barbel is absent.

The former subfamily Macrouroidinae is now considered synonymous with Trachyrincidae.
