= Pseudocetonurus septifer =

Scientific classification
- Domain: Eukaryota
- Kingdom: Animalia
- Phylum: Chordata
- Class: Actinopterygii
- Order: Gadiformes
- Family: Macrouridae
- Subfamily: Macrourinae
- Genus: Pseudocetonurus; Sazonov & Shcherbachev, 1982
- Species: P. septifer

Binomial name
- Pseudocetonurus septifer Sazonov & Shcherbachev, 1982

Species of fish

Pseudocetonurus septifer is a species of rattail, the only known species in the genus Pseudocetonurus. This fish is found at depths of up to 950 m (3,120 ft) in the waters around Hawaii and in the south-eastern Pacific. It has recently also been recorded on the other side of the Pacific, near Taiwan, and this species probably has a pan-Pacific distribution but has been underrecorded due to the depths in which it lives.

This species attains a length of up to 39 cm (15 in). It is unique among rattails in having 7 branchiostegal rays and a large gill opening. This is a generally very dark, sometimes black, fish with a very large head and small, widely spaced eyes. There is a small bioluminescent organ located between the pelvic fins.
