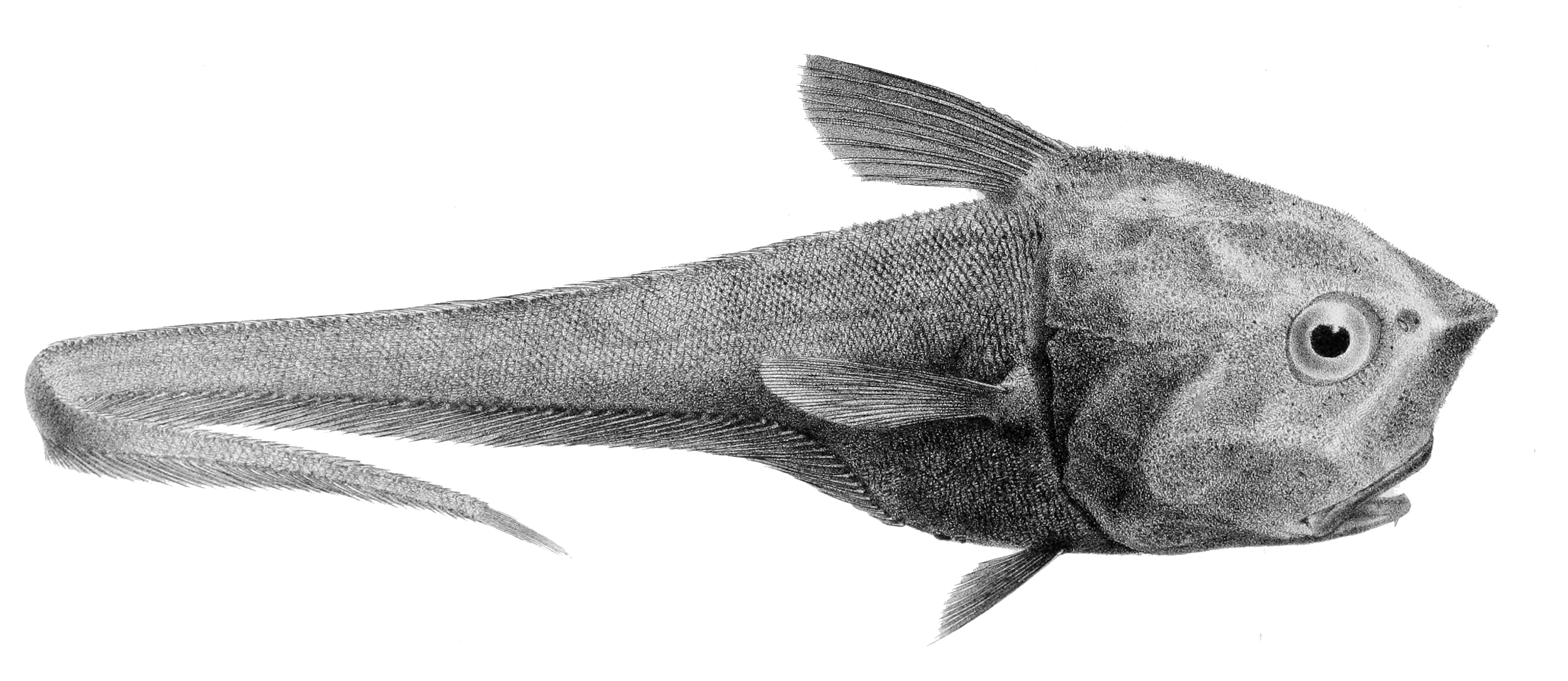
- Globosehead rattail (C. crassiceps)
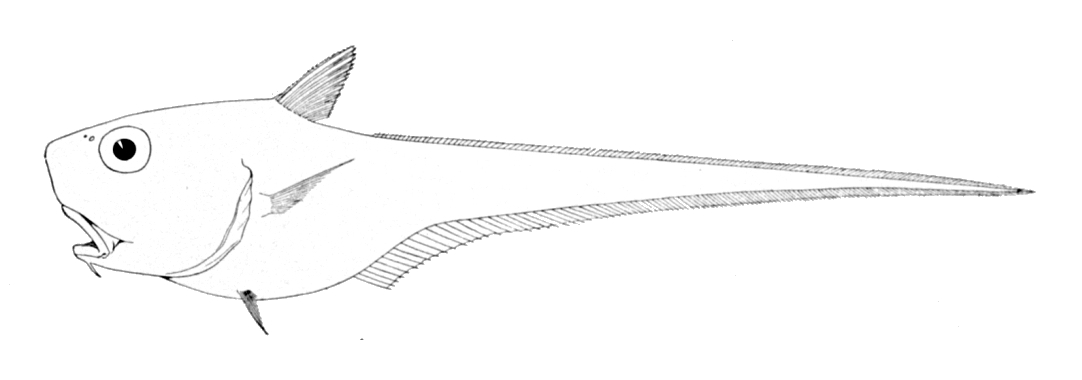
- Globehead grenadier (C. globiceps)

Scientific classification
- Kingdom: Animalia
- Phylum: Chordata
- Class: Actinopterygii
- Order: Gadiformes
- Family: Macrouridae
- Genus: Cetonurus; Günther, 1887

Type species
- Coryphaenoides crassiceps Günther, 1878

= Cetonurus =

Genus of fishes

Cetonurus is a genus of rattails.

== Species ==
The currently recognized species in this genus are:

- Cetonurus crassiceps (Günther, 1878) (globosehead rattail)
- Cetonurus globiceps (Vaillant, 1884) (globehead grenadier)
