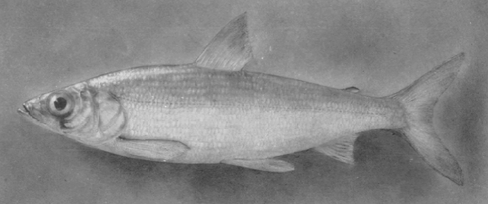
- Photograph of the Ives Lake cisco published by Walter Koelz in 1929

Scientific classification
- Domain: Eukaryota
- Kingdom: Animalia
- Phylum: Chordata
- Class: Actinopterygii
- Order: Salmoniformes
- Family: Salmonidae
- Genus: Coregonus
- Species: C. hubbsi

Binomial name
- Coregonus hubbsi (Koelz, 1929)

Synonyms
- Leucichthys hubbsi Koelz, 1929

= Ives Lake cisco =

Species of fish

The Ives Lake cisco (Coregonus hubbsi) is a freshwater whitefish known to inhabit a single inland lake in the Upper Peninsula of Michigan. The species was last observed in 1983, although there is disagreement on whether it is distinct from Coregonus artedi. This taxon has been found only in Ives Lake, a lake in the Huron Mountains. The lake encompasses a radius of less than 1.5 miles (2.4 km).

== Discovery ==
With the cooperation of the Huron Mountain Club, specimens were first collected by Carl Leavitt Hubbs and Walter Koelz in 1924 and 1927. Koelz published their discovery through the University of Michigan in 1929, and designated the taxon as Leucichthys hubbsi. Koelz found the stream draining Ives Lake quickly dropped over 100 feet (30 m), and postulated that the stream's steepness had prevented faunal interchange since the time of Lake Algonquin.

== Description ==
Walter Koelz described Coregonous hubbsi in a 1929 publication titled "Leucichthys hubbsi, a new cisco, From Ives Lake, Marquette County, Michigan". The color was noted as silvery, with "underlying tones of pea-green and blue green" along with gray fins. Koelz claimed that the Ives Lake cisco was easily distinguishable from Coregonus artedi due to the long gill rakers of C. hubbsi. He reported that the Ives Lake cisco is smaller and has a less slender body than C. artedi.

== Conservation status ==
There has been scientific disagreement on whether or not the Ives Lake cisco is a distinct species from the widespread C. artedi; hence there is no consensus on the conservation status. A 2005 report from the Michigan Department of Natural Resources recommended that the Ives Lake cisco be removed from the list of "special-concern" species. However, a 2013 report from the same publisher gave the Ives Lake cisco a "critically imperiled" G-rank and S-rank for conservation status, and listed the fish as "extremely vulnerable" to climate change.
