= Asthenomacrurus =

Scientific classification
- Kingdom: Animalia
- Phylum: Chordata
- Class: Actinopterygii
- Order: Gadiformes
- Family: Macrouridae
- Genus: Asthenomacrurus; Sazonov & Shcherbachev, 1982

Type species
- Asthenomacrurus victoris Sazonov & Shcherbachev, 1982

Species
- See text.

Genus of fishes

Asthenomacrurus is a genus of rattails of the family Macrouridae.

== Species ==
The currently recognized species in this genus are:

- Asthenomacrurus fragilis (Garman, 1899) (fragile grenadier)
- Asthenomacrurus victoris Sazonov & Shcherbachev, 1982 (victory whiptail)
