= Ilyophis arx =

Scientific classification
- Kingdom: Animalia
- Phylum: Chordata
- Class: Actinopterygii
- Order: Anguilliformes
- Family: Synaphobranchidae
- Genus: Ilyophis
- Species: I. arx

Binomial name
- Ilyophis arx Robins, 1976

Species of fish

Ilyophis arx is an eel in the family Synaphobranchidae (cutthroat eels). It was described by Catherine H. Robins in 1976. It is a marine, deep water-dwelling eel which is known from the eastern Pacific and northeastern Atlantic Ocean. It dwells at a depth range of 1,790 to 3,225 metres (5,873 to 10,581 ft). Males can reach a maximum total length of 44.7 centimetres (17.6 in).
