= Ilyophis nigeli =

Scientific classification
- Domain: Eukaryota
- Kingdom: Animalia
- Phylum: Chordata
- Class: Actinopterygii
- Order: Anguilliformes
- Family: Synaphobranchidae
- Genus: Ilyophis
- Species: I. nigeli

Binomial name
- Ilyophis nigeli Shcherbachev & Sulak, 1997

Species of fish

Ilyophis nigeli is an eel in the family Synaphobranchidae (cutthroat eels). It was described by Yuri Nikolaevich Shcherbachev and Kenneth J. Sulak in 1997. It is a marine, deep water-dwelling eel which is known from Japan, in the northwestern Pacific Ocean. It is known to dwell at a depth range of 700 to 1,800 metres (2,300 to 5,900 ft). Males can reach a maximum total length of 51.3 centimetres (20.2 in).

== Etymology ==
The species epithet "nigeli" was given in honour of Nigel R. Merrett, credited with making "substantial contributions" to the knowledge of the synaphobranchid eels.
