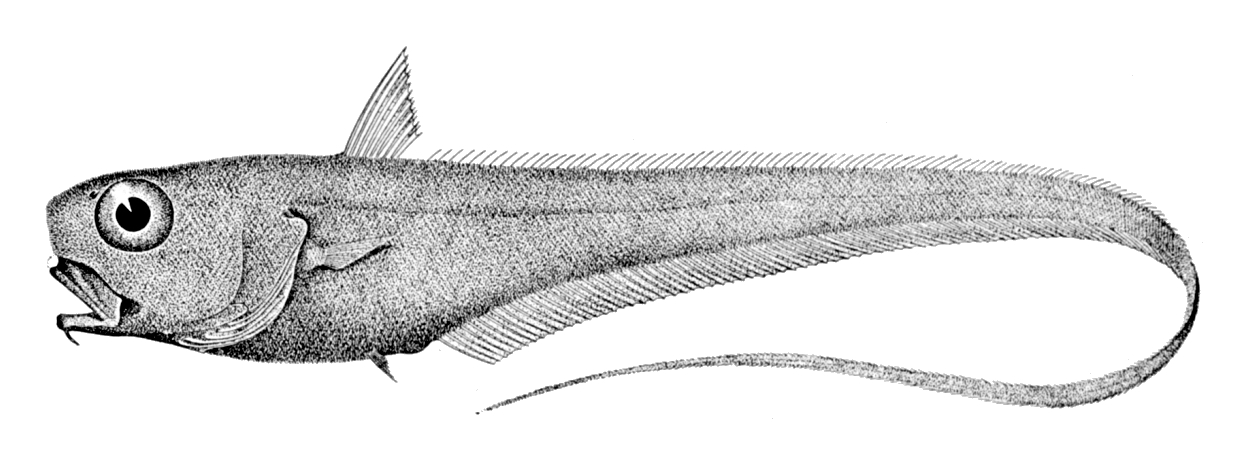
- Bristly Grenadier (T. sulcatus)

Scientific classification
- Domain: Eukaryota
- Kingdom: Animalia
- Phylum: Chordata
- Class: Actinopterygii
- Order: Gadiformes
- Family: Macrouridae
- Subfamily: Macrourinae
- Genus: Trachonurus; Günther, 1887

Type species
- Coryphaenoides villosus Günther, 1877

= Trachonurus =

Genus of fishes

Trachonurus is a genus of rattails.

== Species ==
There are currently six recognized species in this genus:

- Trachonurus gagates Iwamoto & P. J. McMillan, 1997 (Velvet whiptail)
- Trachonurus robinsi Iwamoto, 1997
- Trachonurus sentipellis C. H. Gilbert & Cramer, 1897 (Shaggy whiptail)
- Trachonurus sulcatus (Goode & T. H. Bean, 1885) (Bristly grenadier)
- Trachonurus villosus (Günther, 1877) (Furry whiptail)
- Trachonurus yiwardaus Iwamoto & A. Williams, 1999 (Yiwarda whiptail)
