= Echinomacrurus =

Scientific classification
- Domain: Eukaryota
- Kingdom: Animalia
- Phylum: Chordata
- Class: Actinopterygii
- Order: Gadiformes
- Family: Macrouridae
- Subfamily: Macrourinae
- Genus: Echinomacrurus; Roule, 1916

Type species
- Echinomacrurus mollis Roule 1916

Genus of fishes

Echinomacrurus is a genus of rattails.

== Species ==
There are currently two recognized species in this genus:

- Echinomacrurus mollis Roule, 1916
- Echinomacrurus occidentalis Iwamoto, 1979
