= Lichen moray eel =

Conservation status
- Least Concern (IUCN 3.1)

Scientific classification
- Kingdom: Animalia
- Phylum: Chordata
- Class: Actinopterygii
- Order: Anguilliformes
- Family: Muraenidae
- Genus: Gymnothorax
- Species: G. hubbsi

Binomial name
- Gymnothorax hubbsi J. E. Böhlke & E. B. Böhlke, 1977

Species of fish

The lichen moray (Gymnothorax hubbsi) is a moray eel found in the western Atlantic Ocean, around eastern Florida, the Bahamas, and Cuba. It was first named by Eugenia B. Böhlke and James E. Böhlke in 1977.
