= Francis Bertody Sumner =

American ichthyologist, zoologist and writer

- Sumner in 1923
- Born: August 1, 1874; Pomfret, Connecticut
- Died: September 6, 1945 (aged 71); San Diego, California
- Education: Columbia University
- Spouse: Margaret Elizabeth Clark
- Scientific career
- Fields: Zoology
- Workplaces: U.S. Bureau of Fisheries Laboratory, Scripps Institution of Oceanography

Francis Bertody Sumner (August 1, 1874 – September 6, 1945) was an American ichthyologist, zoologist and writer.

Sumner was born in Pomfret, Connecticut. He studied at the University of Minnesota and Columbia University where in 1901 he received a PhD with a thesis on fish embryology. He became the Director of the U.S. Bureau of Fisheries Laboratory at Woods Hole. He worked as a professor of biology at the Scripps Institution of Oceanography. Sumner was elected to the United States National Academy of Sciences in 1937 and the American Philosophical Society in 1938.

Sumner collected many subspecies of Peromyscus in California. He also studied the pigments of fishes.

== Publications ==
- A Biological Survey of the Waters of Woods Hole and Vicinity (1913)
- Heredity, Environment, and Responsibility (1921)
- Genetic, Distributional, and Evolutionary Studies of the Subspecies of Deer Mice (Peromyscus) (1932)
- The Life History of an American Naturalist (1945)
