= Nigel Merrett =

British zoologist

Nigel Robert Merrett (born 1940) is a British zoologist, ichthyologist, and former director of the fish section of the British Natural History Museum.

In 1998, Merrett participated in an expedition headed by Nikolas Vasilyevich Parin to collect deepwater samples.

== Book ==
In 1997, Merrett, along with R.L. Haedrich, wrote the book Deep-Sea Demersal Fish and Fisheries. In the book, they warn against fishing in deep water.

== Taxon described by him ==
- See Category:Taxa named by Nigel Merrett

== Taxon named in his honor ==
- Merret's snailfish (Careproctus merretti), also called the snakehead snailfish, is named after him.
- The eel Ilyophis nigeli. The species epithet "nigeli" was given in honour of Merrett, who was credited with making "substantial contributions" to the knowledge of the synaphobranchid eels.
