= Carl Leavitt Hubbs =

American zoologist (1894–1979)

Carl Hubbs
- Born: October 19, 1894; Williams, Arizona
- Died: June 30, 1979 (aged 84); La Jolla, California, United States
- Education: Stanford University (MA); University of Michigan (PhD)
- Occupation: Ichthyologist
- Spouse: Laura Clark (m. 1918)
- Children: Frances, Clark, and Earl
- Parent(s): Charles Hubbs; Elizabeth Goss

Carl Leavitt Hubbs (October 19, 1894 – June 30, 1979) was an American ichthyologist.

== Biography ==
=== Early life ===
Carl Leavitt Hubbs was born in Williams, Arizona, to Charles Leavitt and Elizabeth (née Goss) Hubbs. His father had a wide variety of jobs (farmer, iron mine owner, newspaper owner). The family moved several times before settling in San Diego where he got his first taste of natural history. After his parents divorced in 1907, he lived with his mother, who opened a private school in Redondo Beach, California. His maternal grandmother Jane Goble Goss, one of the first female doctors, showed Hubbs how to harvest shellfish and other sea creatures.

One of his teachers, impressed by Hubbs's abilities in science, recommended that he study chemistry at the University of Berkeley. The family moved once more to Los Angeles. In Los Angeles, George Bliss Culver, one of the many volunteers of David Jordan, encouraged Hubbs to abandon his study of birds and instead to study fish, particularly those fish that inhabited the rivers of Los Angeles, which at that time had not been well researched. Hubbs completed his studies at Stanford University, following particularly the ichthyologist Charles Gilbert, a disciple of Jordan. Gilbert became Hubbs's mentor and gave him the responsibility of caring for a collection of fish from Stanford. During this same period, Hubbs met John Snyder, another disciple of Jordan. Hubbs obtained his BA in 1916 and his master's degree in 1917.

=== Curator ===
From 1917 until 1920, Hubbs served as the assistant curator of fish, amphibians, and reptiles at the Field Museum of Natural History in Chicago. In 1920, he took the position of curator of fish at the Museum of Zoology at the University of Michigan, a position he held for 24 years. In 1927, while working at the University of Michigan, he received his PhD, writing his dissertation on The Consequences of Structural Modifications of the Developmental Rate in Fishes Considered in Reference to Certain Problems of Evolution. Hubbs himself along with members of the team and students contributed to the enrichment of the museum's collection. In 1929, he participated in an academic trip to Java where he collected five tons of specimens. Hubbs began to study hybridization among different species of fish.

=== California ===
In addition to his position as conservator, Hubbs was the first director of the Institute for Fisheries Research in the Department of Conservation of Michigan (1930–1935). In this role, he conducted research on the diverse inventory of regional fauna, mortality, water pollution, growth and predation. During his stay at the University of Michigan, Hubbs issued more than 300 publications, almost entirely devoted to fish. His studies were not confined to the United States because he also studied a large collection of fish from Japan.

From 1944 to 1969, Hubbs taught biology at the Scripps Institution of Oceanography at the University of California San Diego in La Jolla, where he replaced Francis Sumner. From 1969 to 1979 he served as professor emeritus. He accepted the post for the new research opportunities it opened. Still, the position offered a lower salary and the rules prevented him from hiring his wife.

The restrictions of World War 2 forced the Scripps Institution to rent his research boat to the army, significantly restricting his research opportunities. During the summer of 1946, Errol Flynn, son of a marine biologist, offered Hubbs to accompany him during a cruise aboard his yacht, the Zaca. The results weren't great but Hubbs discovered high levels of endemism of species of Guadeloupe.

In the years following the war, Hubbs began doing research in the field of commercial and recreational fishing. He observed changes in population patterns depending on the fluctuation in temperatures in the Pacific Ocean. He began studies of ancient climates through such tools as dating mollusk shells. His research led to the founding of a laboratory in 1957 to provide dating for archaeological and geological samples. He bequeathed his collection to San Diego's Archaeological Museum of Man in 1973.

== Scientific research ==
Hubbs issued 712 publications. At first, he studied the fish of the Great Lakes but after moving to La Jolla, he expanded his research to include marine mammals. He also served as an active adviser, both through articles for popular magazines, the Encyclopædia Britannica, and radio broadcasts. He educated the public from 1920 to 1930 the need to protect the habitats of marine mammals. For his environmental protection work he received a gold medal of the San Diego Natural History Society.

Hubbs was a member of several of learned societies, participating in the American Society of Ichthyologists and Herpetologists, the Wildlife Society of San Diego Natural History Society, and the National Academy of Sciences of the Linnean Society of London. He received numerous awards from the Academy of Natural Sciences and the California Academy of Sciences. He was awarded the 1964 Leidy Award from the Academy of Natural Sciences of Philadelphia.

== Personal life ==
Hubbs was married to mathematician Laura Cornelia Clark Hubbs, sister of ichthyologist Frances Clark. They met on a field trip of the Stanford Natural History Club. They married on June 15, 1918. His wife, who had also studied at Stanford, having received her BA in 1915 and her master's degree in 1916, taught math. The couple worked there and had three children who survived to adulthood: Frances, born in 1919; Clark, born in 1921; and Earl, born in 1922. Frances, who married the ichthyologist Robert Miller, and Clark both became ichthyologists, while Earl became a National Park ranger and in later years a high school biology teacher.

== Death ==
Hubbs died June 30, 1979, in La Jolla, California.

== Legacy ==
The Hubbs-SeaWorld Research Institute is named after Hubbs. Hubbs's name was given to a dried-up lake in Nevada, and to a number of organisms:

=== Taxa named in his honor ===
- five genera and twenty-two species of fish, including
  - Allodontichthys hubbsi,
  - Astyanax hubbsi (Mexican cave fish),
  - Colpichthys hubbsi,
  - Coregonus hubbsi (Ives Lake cisco),
  - Cottus hubbsi,
  - Epatretus carlhubbsi (giant hagfish),
  - Gambusia hubbsi,
  - Gobiomorphus hubbsi (bluegill bully),
  - Gymnothorax hubbsi,
  - Lampanyctus hubbsi,
  - Lampetra hubbsi (Kern brook lamprey),
  - Leucichthys hubbsi,
  - Malacoctenus hubbsi (Redside blenny),
  - Merluccius-hubbsi (Argentine hake),
  - Moxostoma hubbsi (copper redhorse),
  - Novumbra hubbsi (olympic mudminnow),
  - Oryzias hubbsi,
  - The Southern scythemarked butterflyfish Prognathodes carlhubbsi Nalbant, 1995
  - Pteronotropis hubbsi (bluehead shiner),
  - Rosenblattichthys hubbsi (Hubbs' pearleye),
  - Strongylura hubbsi
- a genus and a species of lichen
- a species of bird
- two species of mollusk, including Abyssotrophon hubbsi
- a species of crab
- three species of cave arthropod
- two species of insect
- three species of algae
- Hubbs' beaked whale, Mesoplodon carlhubbsi

== Taxon described by him ==
- See Category:Taxa named by Carl Leavitt Hubbs
