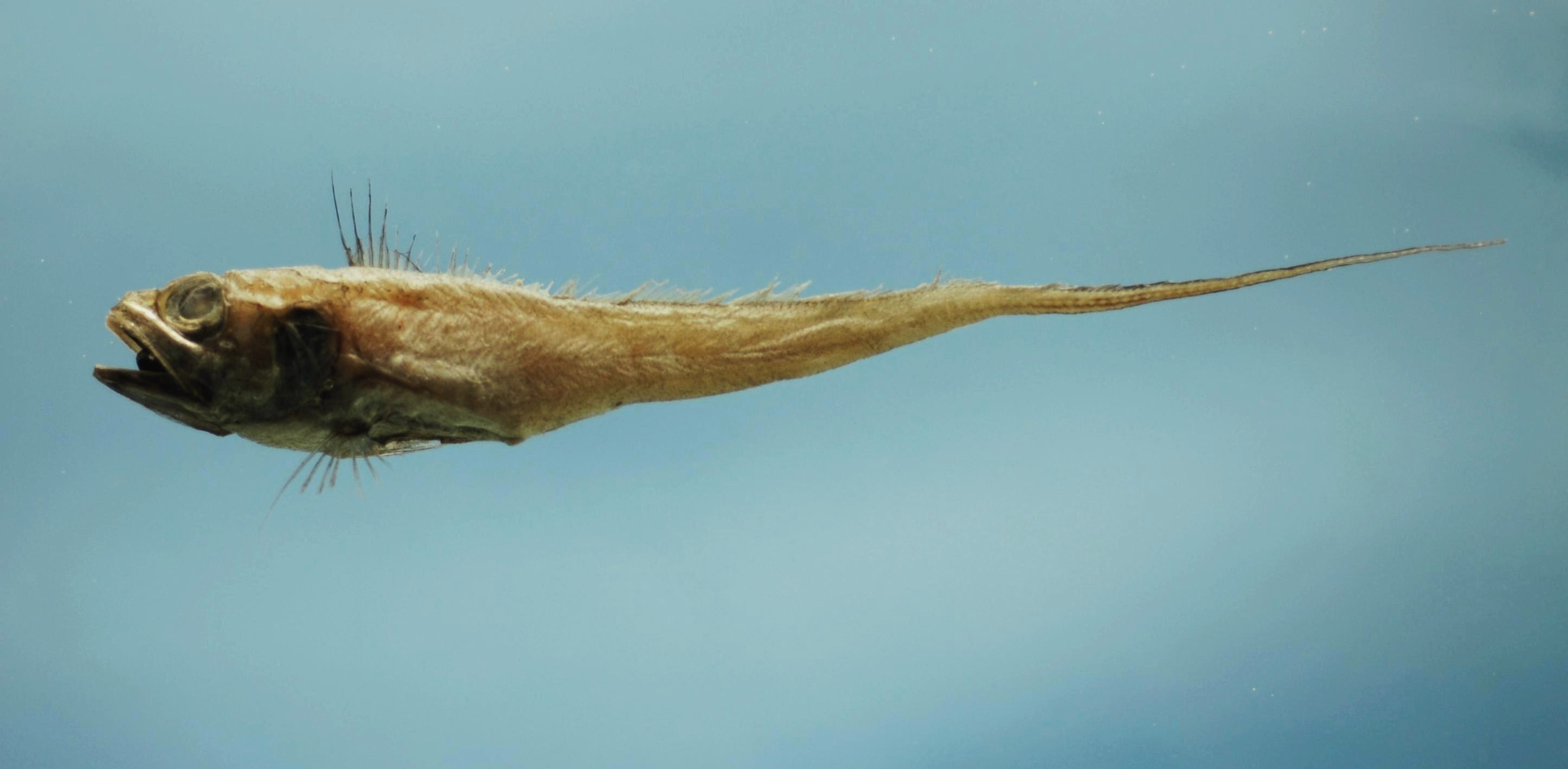
- Vaillant's grenadier (Bathygadus melanobranchus)
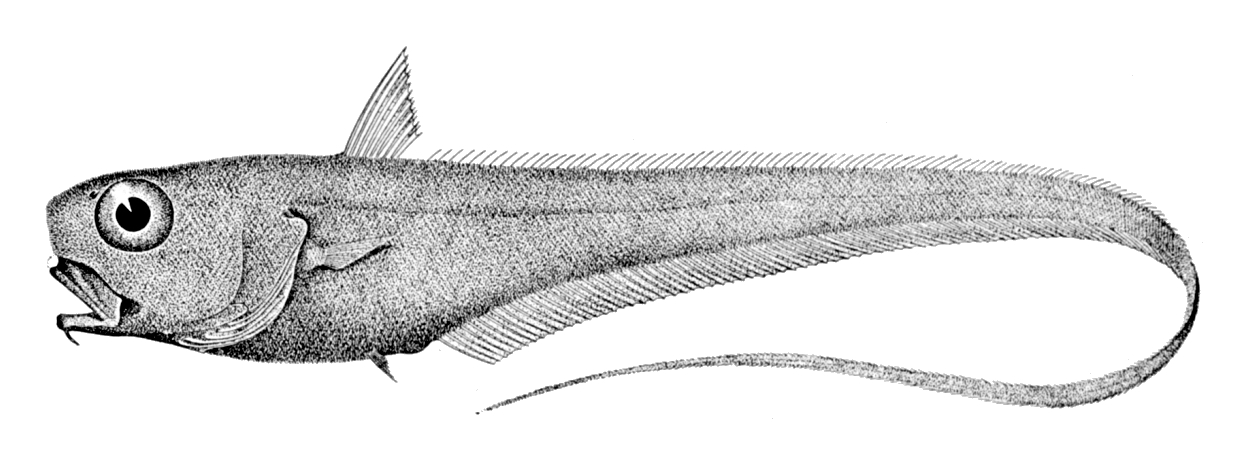
- Trachonurus sulcatus

Scientific classification
- Kingdom: Animalia
- Phylum: Chordata
- Class: Actinopterygii
- Order: Gadiformes
- Suborder: Macrouroidei

Families
- See text

= Macrouroidei =

Macrouroidei Temporal range: Middle Paleocene–present

Family of ray-finned fishes

Macrouroidei is a suborder of deep sea fish, a diverse and ecologically important group, which are part of the order of cod-like fish, the Gadiformes. The species in the Macrouroidei are characterised by their large heads which normally have a single barbel on the chin, projecting snouts, and slender bodies that taper to whip-like tails, without an obvious caudal fin but what there is of the caudal fin is often confluent with the posterior dorsal and anal fins. There are normally two dorsal fins, the anterior dorsal fin is quite high, the posterior quite low but is longer and takes up a greater proportion of the fish's back. A few species in the Trachyrincidae have a single dorsal fin. The long anal fin is almost as long as the posterior dorsal fin, and sometimes it is longer. The pelvic fin is inserted in the vicinity of the thorax and normally has 5–17 fin rays but these are absent in Macrouroides. The body is covered in small scales and if they have a photophore, it is usually on the midline of the abdomen just in front of the anus. The bioluminescence of these fish is produced by symbiotic bioluminescent bacteria. The structure of the skull has been used to show their placing in the Gadiformes, but they differ from the typical cods in that they possess one stout spine in the anterior dorsal fin.

The species in this suborder are mainly benthopelagic, they are found at depths of 200–2000 m, they occur on the sea bed and have a wide distribution from the Arctic to the Antarctic. The species in the Macrouridae normally live near the sea bed on the continental slope, however, some species are bathypelagic or mesopelagic, other species occur on the outer continental shelf. Their bodies are loose in texture rather than firm and they are weak swimmers. Some species are of commercial importance to fisheries.

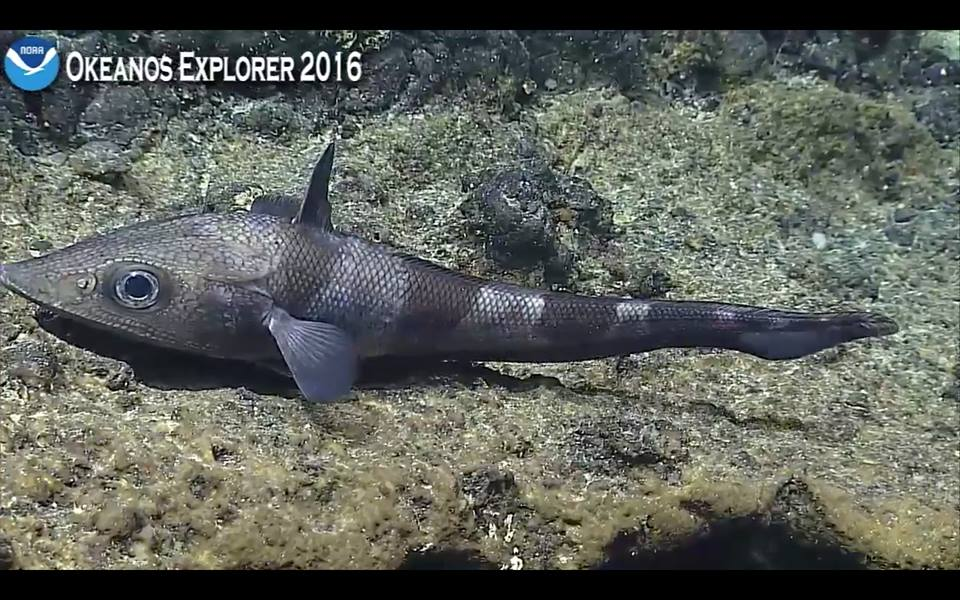
Coelorinchus tokiensis

== Families ==
There are ten families within the Macrouroidei:

- Family Euclichthyidae Cohen, 1984 (Eucla cods)
- Family Muraenolepididae Regan, 1903 (eel cods)
- Family Melanonidae Goode & Bean, 1896 (arrowtails or pelagic cods)
- Family Trachyrincidae Goode & Bean, 1896 (armoured grenadiers)
- Family Moridae Moreau, 1881 (codlings or deepsea cods)
- Family Macruronidae Regan, 1903 (blue grenadiers)
- Family Lyconidae Günther, 1887 (Atlantic hakes)
- Family Bathygadidae Jordan & Evermann, 1898 (rattails)
- Family Steindachneriidae Parr, 1942 (luminous hakes)
- Family Macrouridae Bonaparte, 1831 (grenadiers or rattails)

The earliest known genus is Bobbitichthys Schwarzhans, Milàn & Carnevale, 2021, a stem-macrourid from the middle Paleocene of Denmark. A well-preserved skull of an indeterminate macrourid is known from the Eocene-aged La Meseta Formation of Antarctica. The extinct genus Bolbocara Jordan, 1927 is known from an articulated fossil skeleton from the Late Miocene of California, while Razelaina Carnevale, 2007 is known from the Late Miocene of Algeria.
