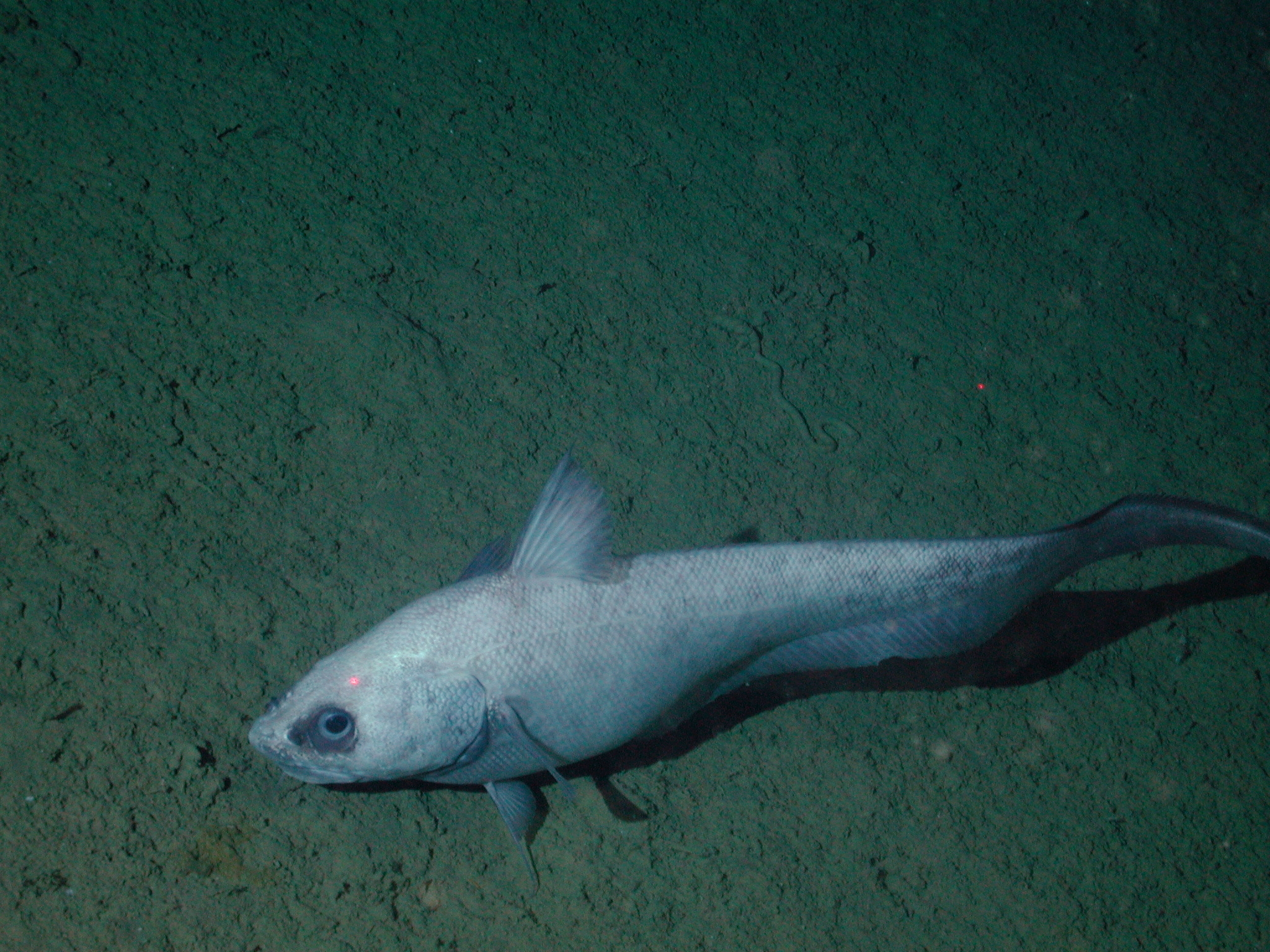
- Coryphaenoides leptolepis

Scientific classification
- Kingdom: Animalia
- Phylum: Chordata
- Class: Actinopterygii
- Division: Teleostei
- Order: Gadiformes
- Suborder: Macrouroidei
- Family: Macrouridae; Bonaparte, 1831

= Grenadiers (fish) =

Subfamily of fishes

Grenadiers or rattails are generally large, brown to black gadiform marine fish of the family Macrouridae, the largest family of the suborder Macrouroidei. Found at great depths from the Arctic to Antarctic, members of this family are amongst the most abundant of the deep-sea fish.

The macrourids form a large and diverse family with 28 extant genera recognized (well over half of the total species are contained in just three genera, Coelorinchus, Coryphaenoides, and Nezumia). They range in length from about 10 cm (3.9 in) in Hymenogadus gracilis to 2.1 m (6.9 ft) in Albatrossia pectoralis. Several attempts have been made to establish a commercial fishery for the most common larger species, such as the giant grenadier, but the fish is considered unpalatable, and attempts thus far have proven unsuccessful. The family as a whole may represent up to 15% of the deep-sea fish population.

Rattails, characterized by large heads with large mouths and eyes, have slender bodies that taper very much to very thin caudal peduncles or tails (except for one species without a caudal fin): this rat-like tail explains the common name "rattail" and the name of the family and the surname are derived from the Greek makros meaning "big" and oura meaning "tail". The first dorsal flat is small, tall and pointed (and may have rays modified into spines); The second dorsal fin runs along the rest of the back and connects to the tail and the large anal fin. The scales are small.

As with many deep-living fish, the lateral line system in grenadiers is well-developed; it is further aided by numerous chemoreceptors located on the head and lips and chemosensory barbels underneath the chin. Benthic species have swim bladders with unique muscles attached to them. The animals are thought to use these muscles to "strum" their bladders and produce sound, possibly playing a role in courtship and mate location. Light-producing organs, photophores, are present in some species; they are located in the middle of the abdomen, just before the anus and underneath the skin.

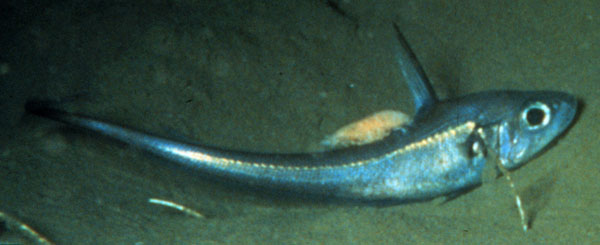
A rattail found in the wreck of the Titanic

Grenadiers have been recorded from depths of about 200 to 7,000 m (660–22,970 ft), and are among the most common benthic fish of the deep (however, two genera are known to prefer the midwater). They may be solitary or may form large schools, as with the roundnose grenadiers. The benthic species are attracted to structural oases, such as hydrothermal vents, cold seeps, and shipwrecks. They are thought to be generalists, feeding on smaller fish, pelagic crustaceans, such as shrimp, amphipods, cumaceans, and less often cephalopods and lanternfish. As well as being important apex predators in the benthic habitat, some species are also notable as scavengers.

As few rattail larvae have been recovered, little is known of their life histories. They are known to produce a large number (over 100,000) of tiny (1–2 millimetres or 0.039–0.079 inches in diameter) eggs made buoyant by lipid droplets. The eggs are presumed to float up to the thermocline (the interface between warmer surface waters and cold, deeper waters) where they develop. The juveniles remain in shallower waters, gradually migrating to greater depths with age.

Spawning may or may not be tied to the seasons, depending on the species. At least one species, Coryphaenoides armatus, is thought to be semelparous; that is, the adults die after spawning. Nonsemelparous species may live to 56 years or more. The macrourins, in general, are thought to have low resilience; commercially exploited species may be overfished and this could soon lead to a collapse of their fisheries.

== Genera ==
Currently 28 extant genera in this family are recognized:

- Albatrossia Jordan & Gilbert, 1898
- Asthenomacrurus Sazonov & Shcherbachev, 1982
- Cetonurichthys Sazonov & Shcherbachev, 1982
- Cetonurus Günther, 1887
- Coelorinchus Giorna, 1809
- Coryphaenoides Gunnerus, 1765
- Cynomacrurus Dollo, 1909
- Echinomacrurus Roule, 1916
- Haplomacrourus Trunov, 1980
- Hymenocephalus Giglioli, 1884
- Hymenogadus Gilbert & Hubbs, 1920
- Kumba Marshall, 1973
- Kuronezumia Iwamoto, 1974
- Lepidorhynchus Richardson, 1846
- Lucigadus Gilbert & Hubbs, 1920
- Macrosmia Merrett, Sazonov & Shcherbachev, 1983
- Macrourus Bloch, 1786
- Malacocephalus Günther, 1862
- Mataeocephalus Berg, 1898
- Mesovagus Nakayama & Endo, 2016
- Nezumia Jordan, 1904
- Odontomacrurus Norman, 1939
- Paracetonurus Marshall, 1973
- Pseudocetonurus Sazonov & Shcherbachev, 1982
- Pseudonezumia Okamura, 1970
- Sphagemacrurus Fowler, 1925
- Spicomacrurus Okamura, 1970
- Trachonurus Günther, 1887
- Ventrifossa Gilbert & Hubbs, 1920

== See also ==
- List of fish common names
