= Javelin (disambiguation) =

A Javelin is a light spear intended for throwing. It is commonly known from the modern athletic discipline, the Javelin throw.

Javelin may also refer to:

- Pilum, a heavy javelin used as a thrown weapon in the Roman legions
- Javelin argument, a logical argument supporting the infinite size of the universe

== Fiction ==
- Javelin (DC Comics), a DC Comics supervillain
- Javelin (Marvel Comics), a character in Rom Spaceknight, a comic book series published by Marvel Comics
- Javelin, a fictional robot from the Custom Robo series

== Military and naval ==
- FGM-148 Javelin, an American anti-tank missile
- Gloster Javelin, a British "all-weather" jet interceptor aircraft, 1951–1968
- HMS Javelin (F61), a 1938 World War 2, Royal Navy destroyer
- Javelin (surface-to-air missile), a British Army portable missile

== Music ==
- Javelin (band), a two-man pop band started in 2005
- Javelin (album), a 2023 album by Sufjan Stevens
- The Javelins, a 1960s band fronted by Ian Gillan
- Javelin (Torke), a 1994 composition by American composer Michael Torke
- The Javelin, a 1997 album by Blue Amazon, or the title track

== Technology ==
- BlackBerry Curve 8900, or Javelin, a BlackBerry Curve phone
- Javelin Software, software company
- Prism (chipset), or PRISM Javelin, a wireless chipset made by Intersil Corporation

== Transportation ==
=== Aviation ===
- ATG Javelin, an American-Israeli civil jet aircraft prototype that did not reach production
- Javelin, American aircraft company, selling plans for the Javelin Wichawk kit-plane
- Argo D-4 Javelin, a former American sounding rocket
- Napier Javelin, a British piston aircraft engine

=== Maritime ===
- Javelin dinghy, one of several types of racing dinghy:
  - Javelin dinghy (US)
  - Javelin dinghy (Europe) (Europe)
  - Javelin dinghy (Australasia) (NZ)
- SS Empire Javelin, a 1944 British World War 2 Infantry Landing Ship

=== Rail ===
- Javelin (train), the Olympic Javelin, a high speed shuttle service in London for the 2012 Summer Olympics
  - British Rail Class 395 the trains used, sometimes referred to as the "Javelin class"

=== Road ===
- AMC Javelin, an American automobile
- Dennis Javelin, a British motorcoach
- Jowett Javelin, a British automobile
- JBA Javelin, a kit-car manufactured by JBA Cars

== Zoology ==
- Javelina, a pig-like animal found in the Americas
- Javelin fish, any of several fishes
  - Coelorinchus australis, the javelin, a fish found around Australia and New Zealand
  - Thorntooth grenadier, the javelin, a name for the fish Lepidorhynchus denticulatus, found around Australia and New Zealand
- Javelin frog, Australian species of frog

== See also ==
- Spear (disambiguation)
