= Javelin fish =

Javelin fish, javelinfish, or javelin, may refer to several fishes:

== Primarily ==
- Coelorinchus australis, the javelin fish, javelinfish, a species of fish found around Australia and New Zealand
- Thorntooth grenadier (Lepidorhynchus denticulatus), the javelin fish, a species of fish found around Australia and New Zealand
- Lighthouse lizardfish (Synodus jaculum), the javelinfish, a species of lizardfish that lives mainly in the Indo-Pacific

== Other fish ==
- Bathylychnops exilis, the javelin spookfish, a species of barreleye found in the northern Pacific and in the eastern Atlantic Ocean near the Azores
- Dipturus doutrei, the javelin skate; see List of data deficient fishes
- Pomadasys kaakan, the javelin grunter, a species of marine ray-finned fish found in the Indian and Pacific
- Synechogobius hasta, the javelin goby; see List of freshwater fishes of Korea

== See also ==
- Search for javelin+fish
- Javelin (disambiguation)
