= Oblique =

Oblique may refer to:

- Oblique muscle (disambiguation), any of several in the human body
- an alternative name for the slash character (/)
- Oblique Seville (born 2001), Jamaican sprinter
- Oblique (album), by jazz vibraphonist Bobby Hutcherson
- Oblique (film), a 2008 Norwegian film
- Oblique (Vasarely), a 1966 collage by Victor Vasarely

== See also ==
- Oblique angle, in geometry
- Oblique lattice, in geometry
- Oblique projection, in geometry and drawing, including cavalier and cabinet projection
- Oblique reflection, in Euclidean geometry
- Oblique triangle, in geometry
- Oblique angle, a synonym for Dutch angle, a cinematographic technique
- Oblique leaf base, a characteristic shape of the base of a leaf
- Oblique cord, near the elbow point
- Oblique fissure, separating the inferior and superior lobes of the lungs
- Oblique strain, an injury of certain muscles, common in baseball
- Oblique argument, in linguistics
- Oblique case, in linguistics
- Oblique banded rattail, a fish also known as a rough-head whiptail
- Oblique correction, in particle physics
- Oblique icebreaker, a special type of icegoing ship
- Oblique motion, in music
- Oblique order, a military formation
- Oblique shock, in gas dynamics
- Oblique type, a form of type that slants slightly to the right in typography
- Oblique wing, in aircraft design
- Obliquity, the angle between an object's rotational and orbital axes
- Obliq, a computer programming language
