= Sheni =

Sheni may refer to:

== Languages ==
- Sheni-Ziriya language

== Religion ==
- Adar Sheni, a month of the Hebrew calendar
- Yom tov sheni shel galuyot, a concept in Jewish practice
- Shenism

== Species ==
- Coelorinchus sheni
- Enneapterygius sheni
- Hemimyzon sheni
- Hieromantis sheni
- Plectranthias sheni
