= Heptranchias howelli =

Heptranchias howelli Temporal range: Middle Eocene-Early Miocene ~37.2–20.43 Ma

Scientific classification
- Kingdom: Animalia
- Phylum: Chordata
- Class: Chondrichthyes
- Subclass: Elasmobranchii
- Division: Selachii
- Order: Hexanchiformes
- Family: Hexanchidae
- Genus: Heptranchias
- Species: H. howelli

Binomial name
- Heptranchias howelli Reed, 1946

Synonyms
- Heptranchias howellii; Notidanion howellii

Extinct species of shark

Heptranchias howelli, the sevengill shark, is a nektonic carnivore in the genus Heptranchias. It is an extinct species that ranged from 37.2 to 20.43 Ma.

== Fossil record ==
Teeth from Heptranchias howelli have been found in Europe. An antero-lateral tooth and an upper lateral tooth were found in Faxe, Denmark in 2014 . In addition, two incomplete antero-lateral teeth and an upper anterior tooth are kept in a private collection. A 2015 study in Trelde Næs yielded a complete lower tooth, 17 incomplete lower teeth, and an unidentified broken tooth.

== Description ==
=== Teeth ===
The upper lateral teeth of the species have a long, acute, strongly sigmoid main cusp. This cusp is serrated and has a dispal cusplet. The main cusp of the antero-lateral teeth is triangular and carries eight mesial cusplets that increase in size along the lower mesial face. The antero-lateral teeth have six main cusplets, the sixth of which is very small. The first cusplet is slightly lower than the others. The cusps are inclined at about a 45-degree angle distally.

The largest tooth found in Trelde Naes was 17.5 millimetres (0.69 in) mesio-distally, 8.5 millimetres (0.33 in) apico-basally and 4.5 millimetres (0.18 in) labio-langually. The root height ranged from 3 to 5 millimetres (0.12 to 0.20 in).

== Distribution ==
Fossils of Heptranchias howelli have been found in:

Eocene

- La Meseta Formation, Seymour Island, Antarctica
- Canada (British Columbia)
- United States (New Jersey, Oregon, Washington)

Miocene

- Uitpa Formation, Cocinetas Basin, Colombia
