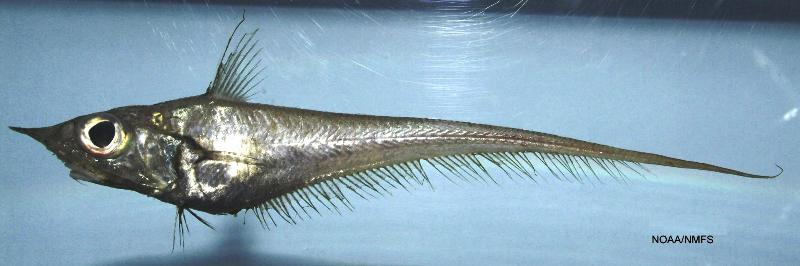
- Coelorinchus caribbaeus

Scientific classification
- Kingdom: Animalia
- Phylum: Chordata
- Class: Actinopterygii
- Division: Teleostei
- Order: Gadiformes
- Family: Macrouridae
- Genus: Coelorinchus; Giorna, 1809

Type species
- Lepidoleprus caelorhincus Risso, 1810

Synonyms
- Abyssicola Goode & T. H. Bean, 1896; Garichthys Whitley, 1934; Mahia McCann & D. G. McKnight, 1980; Coccolus Bonaparte, 1846; Paramacrurus Bleeker, 1874; Oxymacrurus Bleeker, 1874; Coelorhynchus subgenus Quincuncia Gilbert and Hubbs, 1920; Coelorhynchus subgenus Oxygadus Gilbert and Hubbs, 1920

= Coelorinchus =

Genus of rattail fishes

Coelorinchus is a genus of rattail fish.

The name derives from Greek κοῖλος (koilos, "hollow") and ῥύγχος (rhynchos, "snout").

== Species ==
There are currently 121 recognized species in this genus:

- Coelorinchus acanthiger Barnard, 1925 (Surgeon grenadier)
- Coelorinchus acantholepis C. H. Gilbert & C. L. Hubbs, 1920
- Coelorinchus aconcagua Iwamoto, 1978 (Aconcagua grenadier)
- Coelorinchus acutirostris H. M. Smith & Radcliffe, 1912 (Spear-nose whiptail)
- Coelorinchus amirantensis Iwamoto, Golani, Baranes & Goren, 2006
- Coelorinchus amydrozosterus Iwamoto & A. Williams, 1999 (Faint-banded whiptail)
- Coelorinchus anatirostris D. S. Jordan & C. H. Gilbert, 1904 (Duck-bill grenadier)
- Coelorinchus anisacanthus Sazonov, 1994
- Coelorinchus aratrum C. H. Gilbert, 1905
- Coelorinchus argentatus H. M. Smith & Radcliffe, 1912 (Silver whiptail)
- Coelorinchus argus M. C. W. Weber, 1913 (Eye-spot grenadier)
- Coelorinchus aspercephalus Waite, 1911 (Rough-head whiptail)
- Coelorinchus asteroides Okamura, 1963
- Coelorinchus australis (J. Richardson, 1839) (Javelin rattail)
- Coelorinchus biclinozonalis T. Arai & P. J. McMillan, 1982 (Two-barred whiptail)
- Coelorinchus bollonsi McCann & D. G. McKnight, 1980 (Bollons' rattail)
- Coelorinchus braueri Barnard, 1925 (Shovel-nose grenadier)
- Coelorinchus brevirostris Okamura, 1984
- Coelorinchus caelorhincus (A. Risso, 1810) (Hollow-snout grenadier)
- Coelorinchus campbellicus McCann & D. G. McKnight, 1980
- Coelorinchus canus (Garman, 1899) (Clear-snout grenadier)
- Coelorinchus caribbaeus (Goode & T. H. Bean, 1885) (Black-fin grenadier)
- Coelorinchus carinifer C. H. Gilbert & C. L. Hubbs, 1920
- Coelorinchus caudani (Koehler, 1896)
- Coelorinchus celaenostomus P. J. McMillan & Paulin, 1993 (Black-lip rattail)
- Coelorinchus charius Iwamoto & A. Williams, 1999 (Graceful whiptail)
- Coelorinchus chilensis C. H. Gilbert & W. F. Thompson, 1916 (Chilean grenadier)
- Coelorinchus cingulatus C. H. Gilbert & C. L. Hubbs, 1920
- Coelorinchus commutabilis H. M. Smith & Radcliffe, 1912
- Coelorinchus cookianus McCann & D. G. McKnight, 1980 (Cook's rattail)
- Coelorinchus cylindricus Iwamoto & Merrett, 1997
- Coelorinchus denticulatus Regan, 1921 (File-snout grenadier)
- Coelorinchus divergens Okamura & Yato, 1984
- Coelorinchus dorsalis C. H. Gilbert & C. L. Hubbs, 1920
- Coelorinchus doryssus C. H. Gilbert, 1905
- Coelorinchus fasciatus (Günther, 1878) (Banded whiptail)
- Coelorinchus flabellispinnis (Alcock, 1894)
- Coelorinchus formosanus Okamura, 1963 (Formosa grenadier)
- Coelorinchus fuscigulus Iwamoto, H. C. Ho & K. T. Shao, 2009
- Coelorinchus gaesorhynchus Iwamoto & A. Williams, 1999 (Javelin whiptail)
- Coelorinchus geronimo N. B. Marshall & Iwamoto, 1973
- Coelorinchus gilberti D. S. Jordan & C. L. Hubbs, 1925
- Coelorinchus gladius C. H. Gilbert & Cramer, 1897
- Coelorinchus goobala Iwamoto & A. Williams, 1999 (Goobala whiptail)
- Coelorinchus gormani Iwamoto & K. J. Graham, 2008
- Coelorinchus hexafasciatus Okamura, 1982 (Six-band grenadier)
- Coelorinchus hige Matsubara, 1943
- Coelorinchus hoangi Iwamoto & K. J. Graham, 2008
- Coelorinchus horribilis P. J. McMillan & Paulin, 1993 (Horrible rattail)
- Coelorinchus hubbsi Matsubara, 1936
- Coelorinchus immaculatus Sazonov & Iwamoto, 1992
- Coelorinchus infuscus P. J. McMillan & Paulin, 1993 (Dusky rattail)
- Coelorinchus innotabilis McCulloch, 1907 (Notable rattail)
- Coelorinchus japonicus (Temminck & Schlegel, 1846) (Japanese grenadier)
- Coelorinchus jordani H. M. Smith & T. E. B. Pope, 1906
- Coelorinchus kaiyomaru T. Arai & Iwamoto, 1979 (Campbell's whiptail)
- Coelorinchus kamoharai Matsubara, 1943 (Kamohara's grenadier)
- Coelorinchus karrerae Trunov, 1984 (Karrer's whiptail)
- Coelorinchus kermadecus D. S. Jordan & C. H. Gilbert, 1904 (Kermadec rattail)
- Coelorinchus kishinouyei D. S. Jordan & Snyder, 1900 (Mugura grenadier)
- Coelorinchus labiatus (Koehler, 1896) (Spear-snouted grenadier)
- Coelorinchus lasti Iwamoto & A. Williams, 1999 (Rough-snout whiptail)
- Coelorinchus leptorhinus M. L. Chiou, K. T. Shao & Iwamoto, 2004
- Coelorinchus longissimus Matsubara, 1943
- Coelorinchus macrochir (Günther, 1877) (Long-arm grenadier)
- Coelorinchus macrolepis C. H. Gilbert & C. L. Hubbs, 1920
- Coelorinchus macrorhynchus H. M. Smith & Radcliffe, 1912 (Big-snout whiptail)
- Coelorinchus maculatus C. H. Gilbert & C. L. Hubbs, 1920 (Blotch whiptail)
- Coelorinchus marinii C. L. Hubbs, 1934 (Marini's grenadier)
- Coelorinchus matamua (McCann & D. G. McKnight, 1980) (Mahia whiptail)
- Coelorinchus matsubarai Okamura, 1982
- Coelorinchus maurofasciatus P. J. McMillan & Paulin, 1993 (Dark-banded rattail)
- Coelorinchus mayiae Iwamoto & A. Williams, 1999 (False silver whiptail)
- Coelorinchus mediterraneus Iwamoto & Ungaro, 2002
- Coelorinchus melanobranchus Iwamoto & Merrett, 1997
- Coelorinchus melanosagmatus Iwamoto & M. E. Anderson, 1999
- Coelorinchus mirus McCulloch, 1926 (Gargoyle fish)
- Coelorinchus multifasciatus Sazonov & Iwamoto, 1992
- Coelorinchus multispinulosus Katayama, 1942 (Spear-nose grenadier)
- Coelorinchus mycterismus P. J. McMillan & Paulin, 1993 (Upturned-snout rattail)
- Coelorinchus mystax P. J. McMillan & Paulin, 1993 (Patterned rattail)
- Coelorinchus nazcaensis Sazonov & Iwamoto, 1992
- Coelorinchus notatus H. M. Smith & Radcliffe, 1912
- Coelorinchus obscuratus P. J. McMillan & Iwamoto, 2009
- Coelorinchus occa (Goode & T. H. Bean, 1885) (Sword-snout grenadier)
- Coelorinchus oliverianus Phillipps, 1927 (Hawk-nose grenadier)
- Coelorinchus osipullus P. J. McMillan & Iwamoto, 2009
- Coelorinchus parallelus (Günther, 1877) (Spiny grenadier)
- Coelorinchus pardus Iwamoto & A. Williams, 1999 (Leopard whiptail)
- Coelorinchus parvifasciatus P. J. McMillan & Paulin, 1993 (Small-banded rattail)
- Coelorinchus platorhynchus H. M. Smith & Radcliffe, 1912
- Coelorinchus polli N. B. Marshall & Iwamoto, 1973
- Coelorinchus productus C. H. Gilbert & C. L. Hubbs, 1916 (Unicorn grenadier)
- Coelorinchus pseudoparallelus Trunov, 1983
- Coelorinchus quadricristatus (Alcock, 1891)
- Coelorinchus quincunciatus C. H. Gilbert & C. L. Hubbs, 1920
- Coelorinchus radcliffei C. H. Gilbert & C. L. Hubbs, 1920
- Coelorinchus scaphopsis (C. H. Gilbert, 1890) (Shoulder-spot grenadier)
- Coelorinchus semaphoreus Iwamoto & Merrett, 1997 (Semaphore whiptail)
- Coelorinchus sereti Iwamoto & Merrett, 1997 (Short-tooth whiptail)
- Coelorinchus sexradiatus C. H. Gilbert & C. L. Hubbs, 1920
- Coelorinchus shcherbachevi Iwamoto & Merrett, 1997 (False duckbill whiptail)
- Coelorinchus sheni M. L. Chiou, K. T. Shao & Iwamoto, 2004
- Coelorinchus simorhynchus Iwamoto & M. E. Anderson, 1994
- Coelorinchus smithi C. H. Gilbert & C. L. Hubbs, 1920 (False graceful whiptail)
- Coelorinchus sparsilepis Okamura, 1984
- Coelorinchus spathulatus P. J. McMillan & Paulin, 1993 (Spatulate rattail)
- Coelorinchus spilonotus Sazonov & Iwamoto, 1992
- Coelorinchus spinifer C. H. Gilbert & C. L. Hubbs, 1920
- Coelorinchus supernasutus P. J. McMillan & Paulin, 1993 (Supa-nose rattail)
- Coelorinchus thompsoni C. H. Gilbert & C. L. Hubbs, 1920
- Coelorinchus thurla Iwamoto & A. Williams, 1999 (Thurla whiptail)
- Coelorinchus tokiensis (Steindachner & Döderlein, 1887)
- Coelorinchus trachycarus Iwamoto, P. J. McMillan & Shcherbachev, 1999
- Coelorinchus triocellatus C. H. Gilbert & C. L. Hubbs, 1920
- Coelorinchus trunovi Iwamoto & M. E. Anderson, 1994
- Coelorinchus velifer C. H. Gilbert & C. L. Hubbs, 1920
- Coelorinchus ventrilux N. B. Marshall & Iwamoto, 1973 (Fire-belly grenadier)
- Coelorinchus vityazae Iwamoto, Y. N. Shcherbachev & Marquardt, 2004
- Coelorinchus weberi C. H. Gilbert & C. L. Hubbs, 1920
- Coelorinchus yurii Iwamoto, Golani, Baranes & Goren, 2006
