= Sevengill shark =

Sevengill shark may refer to:

- Broadnose sevengill shark
- Sharpnose sevengill shark
