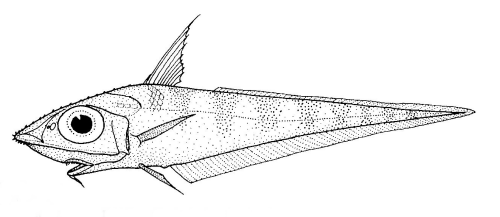
- Drawing by Dr Tony Ayling

Scientific classification
- Kingdom: Animalia
- Phylum: Chordata
- Class: Actinopterygii
- Division: Teleostei
- Order: Gadiformes
- Suborder: Macrouroidei
- Family: Macrouridae
- Genus: Coelorinchus
- Species: C. bollonsi

Binomial name
- Coelorinchus bollonsi McCann & McKnight, 1980

= Bollons' rattail =

Species of fish

Bollons' rattail (Coelorinchus bollonsi) is a species of rattail endemic to New Zealand. It is widespread off both west and east coasts, and along the Chatham Rise, at depths of 300-800 m. Bollons' rattail is a benthopelagic species, living and feeding between the ocean floor and midwater levels.

== Etymology ==
The species name bollonsi is in reference to Captain John Peter Bollons (1862–1929). Born in England, Captain Bollons ran government steamships, dropping annual supplies to subantarctic islands off New Zealand. He was an amateur naturalist, ornithologist, and ethnographer.

== Description ==
Bollon's rattail can be distinguished from other species of New Zealand Coelorinchus by the blunt short snout, large eye sockets, a large photophore (light organ), pattern of four small patches of scales on the underside of the head, which is otherwise naked, and the colour pattern. Colouration is brown with approximately 8-10 saddle marks, which may be faded or lost completely on larger specimens (over about 20 cm total length). The head has small dots on the posterior and fins are dark brown to black but the second dorsal fin is usually pale coloured. Its length is between 10 and 25 cm. Maximum size has been recorded as 71 cm total length.
