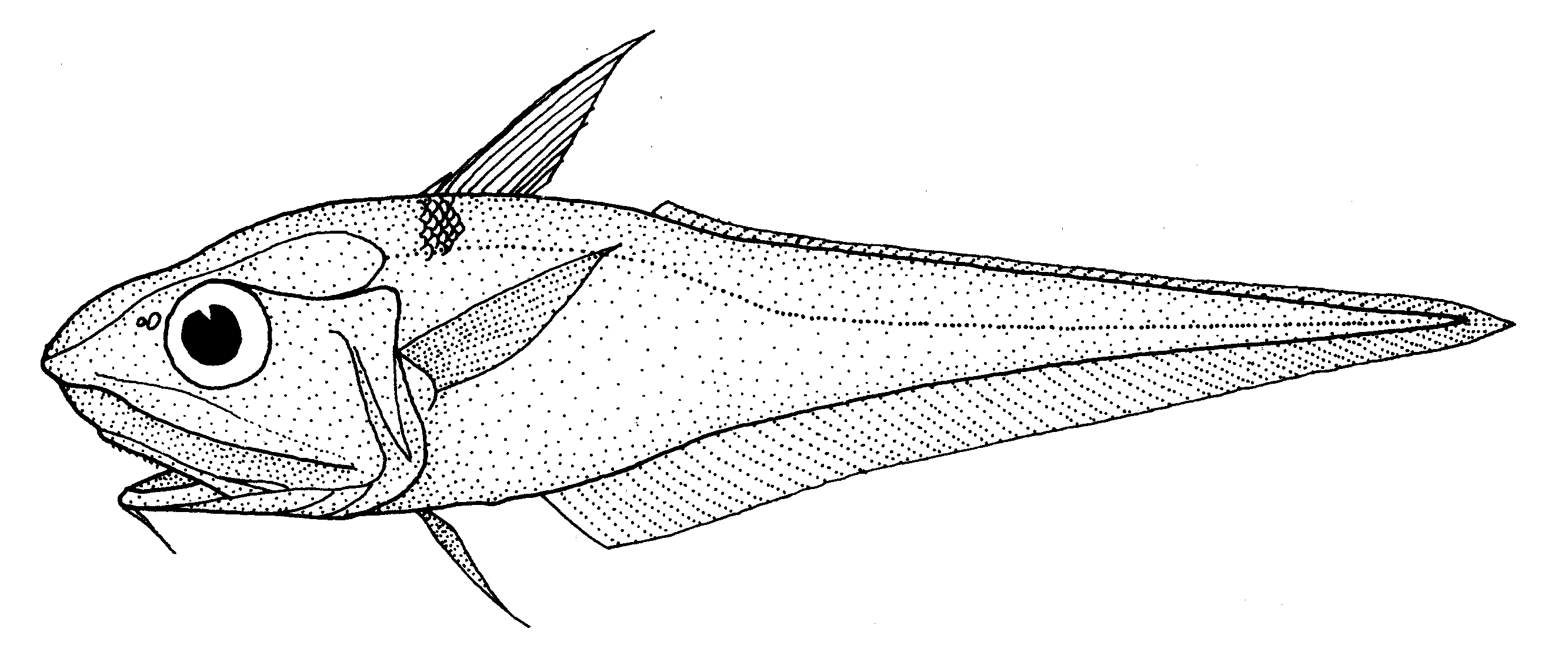
- Drawing by Dr Tony Ayling

Scientific classification
- Domain: Eukaryota
- Kingdom: Animalia
- Phylum: Chordata
- Class: Actinopterygii
- Order: Gadiformes
- Family: Macrouridae
- Subfamily: Macrourinae
- Genus: Coelorinchus
- Species: C. matamua

Binomial name
- Coelorinchus matamua (McCann & McKnight, 1980)

= Mahia whiptail =

Species of fish

The Mahia whiptail, large-headed whiptail or Mahia rattail (Coelorinchus matamua) is a species of rattail found circumpolar in the southern oceans, at depths of between 450 and 1,000 m. Its length is between 45 and 65 cm.
