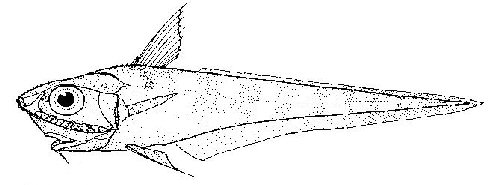
- Drawing by Dr Tony Ayling

Scientific classification
- Kingdom: Animalia
- Phylum: Chordata
- Class: Actinopterygii
- Division: Teleostei
- Order: Gadiformes
- Suborder: Macrouroidei
- Family: Macrouridae
- Genus: Coelorinchus
- Species: C. cookianus

Binomial name
- Coelorinchus cookianus McCann & McKnight, 1980

= Cook's rattail =

Species of fish

Cook's rattail (Coelorinchus cookianus) is a species of rattail endemic to New Zealand. It is only found in the northern and central regions at depths of 400-800 m, with some specimens also collected on the Chatham Rise. The species is benthopelagic, living and feeding between the ocean floor and midwater levels.

== Etymology ==
The species name cookianus is in reference to Captain James Cook, the English captain and explorer.

== Description ==
Colouration is light brown with approximately 8-10 distinctive saddle marks and silvery white on the ventral side. Fins are a muted light to dark colour.

Its length is between 10 and 25 cm. Maximum size has been recorded as 30 cm total length.
