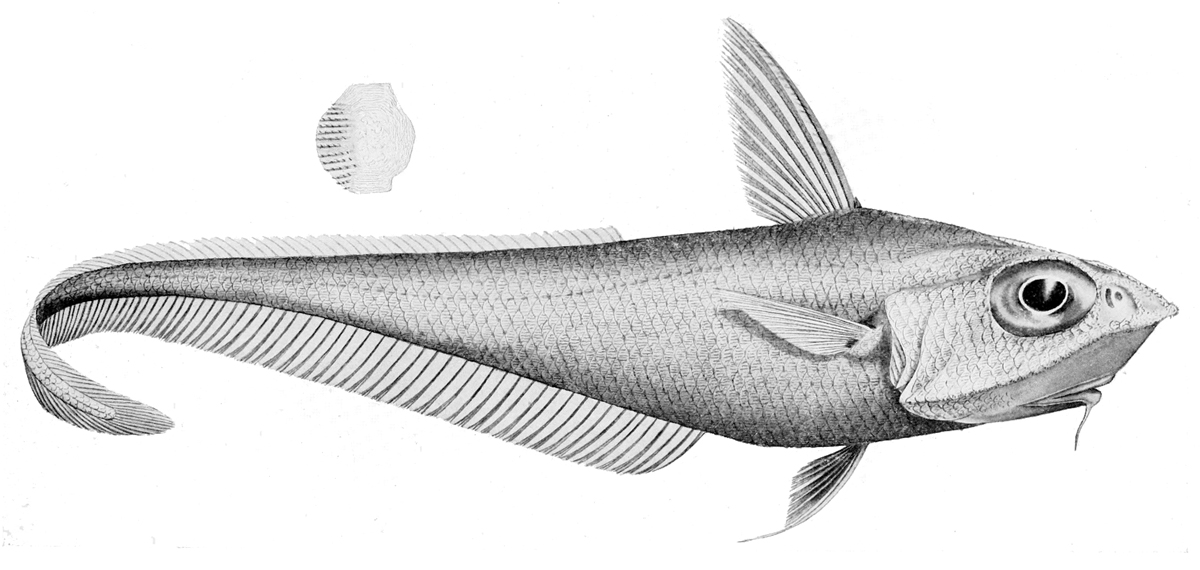
- Drawing by Allan Riverstone McCulloch

Scientific classification
- Kingdom: Animalia
- Phylum: Chordata
- Class: Actinopterygii
- Order: Gadiformes
- Suborder: Macrouroidei
- Family: Macrouridae
- Genus: Coelorinchus
- Species: C. mirus

Binomial name
- Coelorinchus mirus McCulloch, 1926

= Gargoyle fish =

Species of fish

The gargoyle fish or small-eye rattail (Coelorinchus mirus) is a species of rattail found around southeast Australia and between New Zealand and the Chatham Islands.
