= Unicorn grenadier =

Scientific classification
- Kingdom: Animalia
- Phylum: Chordata
- Class: Actinopterygii
- Order: Gadiformes
- Suborder: Macrouroidei
- Family: Macrouridae
- Genus: Coelorinchus
- Species: C. productus

Binomial name
- Coelorinchus productus Gilbert & Hubbs, 1916

Species of fish

The unicorn grenadier (Coelorinchus productus) is a species of rattail. This fish is found at depths of up to 600 metres (2,000 ft) in the waters around northern Taiwan, southern Japan and the East China Sea.

This fish grows to a length of about 31 cm (12 in) and is generally brown above, silvery below, with blackish fins and mouth and gill cavities. It can be distinguished from its congeners by its fairly long, pointed snout, teeth restricted to the central premaxilla and by only having a small ventral bioluminescent organ.
