= List of English translations of De rerum natura =

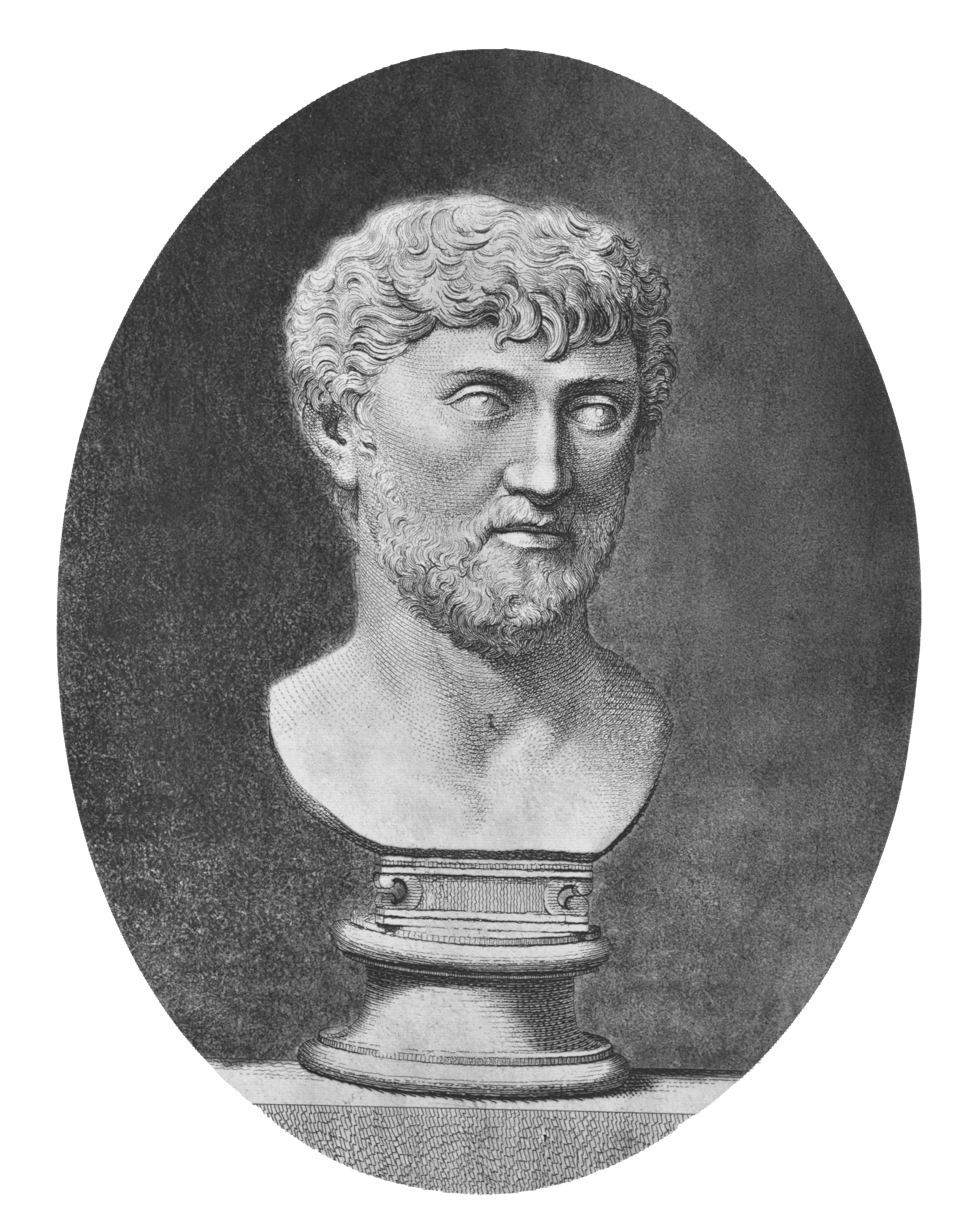
Titus Lucretius Carus

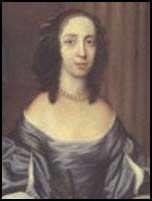
Lucy Hutchinson

Lucretius, Roman poet; and Hutchinson, possibly his earliest English translator.

De rerum natura (usually translated as On the Nature of Things) is a philosophical epic poem written by Lucretius in Latin around 55 BCE. The poem was lost during the Middle Ages, rediscovered in 1417, and first printed in 1473. Its earliest published translation into any language (French) did not occur until 1650; in English — although earlier partial or unpublished translations exist — the first complete translation to be published was that of Thomas Creech, in heroic couplets, in 1682. Only a few more English translations appeared over the next two centuries, but in the 20th century translations began appearing more frequently.

Only complete (or nearly complete) translations are listed. Notable translations of individual passages include the "invocation to Venus" by Edmund Spenser in The Faerie Queene IV.X.44-47; and five passages in John Dryden's Sylvae (1685).

== Key ==
- Year — The year of first publication (except where * indicates year of composition).
- Translator
- Publication — The name of the work as published; ISBNs and links to PDFs when available; other publication information.
- Source — Some translators refer to multiple Latin editions; only the primary Latin source text (if known) is noted here.
- Notes — "Prose" or the form of verse is always listed first, so that sorting on this column groups formally similar translations; other germane information follows.

== Table ==
Year	Translator	Publication	Source	Notes
1600s*	Anonymous	In mss: Bodl. MS. Rawl. D. 314.	Gifanius (1595)	Prose.
1650s*	Hutchinson, Lucy	In mss until Lucy Hutchinson's translation of Lucretius: De rerum natura. ed. Hugh de Quehen (1996) ISBN 0-472-10778-X	Pareus (1631)	Heroic couplets.
1656	Evelyn, John	Book 1 only: An essay on the first book of T. Lucretius Carus De rerum natura (1656). Evelyn's complete extant translation (lacking Book 2) not published until John Evelyn's Translation of Titus Lucretius Carus: 'De rerum natura': An Old-Spelling Critical Edition ed Repetzki, (Peter Lang (2000) ISBN 978-0820443881)	Lambinus (1570)	Heroic couplets.
1682	Creech, Thomas	First edition published pseudonymously as "Daphnis"; subsequently under Creech's own name. Second edition (1683) at Google Books, often reprinted.		Heroic couplets. The first complete English translation published, and the standard translation of the 18th century.
1743	Anonymous	Of the Nature of Things at the Internet Archive "Plates by Guernier."		Prose. Facing Latin text.
1805	Good, John Mason	The Nature of Things: A Didactic Poem: Vol 1 at the Internet Archive, Vol 2 at the Internet Archive. Reprinted in John Selby Watson's translation On the Nature of Things (1851)	Wakefield (1796–97)	Blank verse. Facing Latin text.
1813	Busby, Thomas	The Nature of Things: A Didascalic Poem		Heroic couplets.
1851	Watson, John Selby	On the Nature of Things at Google Books, often reprinted.	Forbiger (1828)	Prose.
1864	Munro, H.A.J.	Text, commentary, and translation in volumes 1, 2, and 3, respectively. Often reprinted: Vol 3 rpt. of 1900 at the Internet Archive.	Munro (1860)	Prose.
1872	Johnson, Charles Frederick	On the Nature of Things at the Internet Archive	Munro (1860)	Blank verse. The first American translation.
1884	Baring, Thomas Charles	The scheme of Epicurus; a rendering into English verse of the unfinished poem of Lucretius, entitled "De rerum natura", ("The Nature of things") at Google Books		Fourteener couplets.
1910	Bailey, Cyril	Lucretius On the Nature of Things at the Internet Archive. Often reprinted.	Bailey (1898/1921)	Prose.
1916	Leonard, William Ellery	Of the Nature of Things at the Internet Archive. Reprinted in Everyman's Library.	Guissani (1896–98)	Blank verse. Facing Latin text.
1919	Allison, Sir Robert	On the Nature of Things at the Internet Archive	Munro (1866)	Blank verse.
1924	Rouse, W. H. D.	Lucretius: On the Nature of Things (Loeb revised edn. ISBN 978-0674992009)	Rouse (Loeb 1924)	Prose. Facing Latin text.
1929	Jackson, Thomas	Titus Lucretius Carus on the nature of things	Bailey (1921)	Rhythmic prose.
1933	Way, Arthur S.	Lucretius on the problem of existence		6-beat lines, rhymed couplets.
1937	Trevelyan, R. C.	De Rerum Natura. Selections published in 1920 as Translations From Lucretius at the Internet Archive.	Bailey (1921)	Blank verse.
1946	Bennett, Charles Ernest	On the nature of things		Blank verse.
1950	Brown, W. Hannaford	Lucretius on the Nature of Things		Imitative dactylic hexameters.
1951	Latham, Ronald E.	On the Nature of the Universe (Penguin Classics rev. by John Godwin (1994) ISBN 978-0140446104)		Prose.
1956	Winspear, Alban Dewes	De rerum natura, by Lucretius, the Roman poet of science	Bailey (1921)	Irregular iambics.
1963	Johnson, L. L.	On the Nature of Things		Imitative dactyllic hexameters.
1965	Geer, Russel Mortimer	On nature		Prose.
1965	Mantinband, James H.	On the nature of the universe (De rerum natura)		6-beat lines.
1968	Humphries, Rolfe	The Way Things Are ISBN 0-253-20125-X	Rouse (Loeb 1924)	Blank verse.
1969	Smith, Martin Ferguson	On the Nature of Things (revised edn. (2001) ISBN 978-0872205871)		Prose.
1973	Wooby, Philip F.	Lucretius: about reality ISBN 978-0802221223		Imitative dactyllic hexameters.
1974	Bovie, Palmer	Lucretius: On the nature of Things. De Rerum Natura. A Modern Verse Translation	Leonard & Smith	Verse.
1976	Sisson, C. H.	The Poem on Nature ISBN 978-1857547238		6-beat lines.
1977	Copley, Frank O.	The Nature of Things (Norton rpt. (2011) ISBN 978-0393341362)	Bailey (1962)	Loose blank verse.
1995	Esolen, Anthony	On the Nature of Things ISBN 978-0801850554		Loose blank verse.
1997	Melville, Ronald	On the Nature of the Universe (Oxford World's Classics rpt. ISBN 978-0199555147)	Rouse, rev. Smith (Loeb 1975)	Blank verse.
2003	Englert, Walter	On the Nature of Things ISBN 978-0941051217		"Rough five or six beat line."
2007	Stallings, Alicia	The Nature of Things (Penguin Classics ISBN 978-0140447965)	Rouse, rev. Smith (Loeb 1975)	Fourteener rhymed couplets.
2008	Slavitt, David R.	De Rerum Natura (The Nature of Things): A Poetic Translation ISBN 978-0520255937		6-beat lines.
2010	Johnston, Ian	On the Nature of Things ISBN 978-1935238768	Munro (1900)	Blank verse.
2016	Cobbold, G.B.	The Nature of the Universe ISBN 978-0865168381		Prose.
