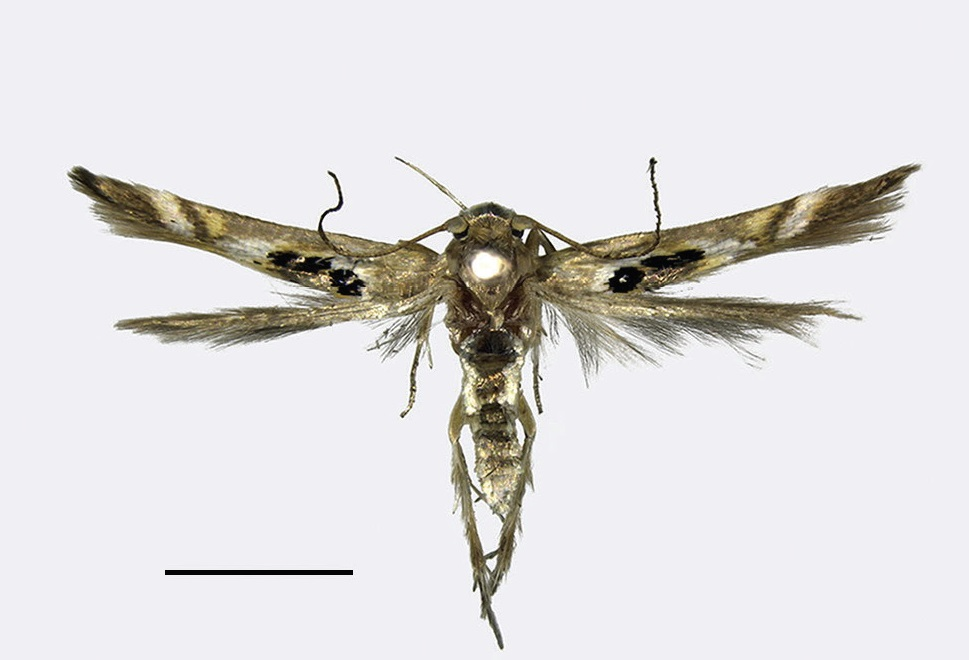

Scientific classification
- Domain: Eukaryota
- Kingdom: Animalia
- Phylum: Arthropoda
- Class: Insecta
- Order: Lepidoptera
- Family: Stathmopodidae
- Genus: Hieromantis
- Species: H. arcuata

Binomial name
- Hieromantis arcuata Guan & Li, 2015

= Hieromantis arcuata =

Species of moth

Hieromantis arcuata is a moth of the Stathmopodidae family. It is found in China (Guangdong, Hainan, Hong Kong).

The wingspan is 8–9 mm (0.31–0.35 in). The forewings are greyish brown, with scattered yellowish brown scales, the distal one-fifth ochreous brown and with a greyish brown band extending from the costal two-thirds obliquely inward to the dorsal three-fifths, its inner side set an ill-defined ochre-yellow patch neither reaching the costa nor the dorsum.

== Description ==
On its outer side is a broad silvery white band and there is an elliptical spot located between the basal one-fourth and two-fifths on the dorsum, consisting of tufts of erect silvery grey scales with a metallic luster, on its inner side is a rounded black spot with a white dot in the centre, anterior to it are two joined black spots along the middle of the fold, these four spots forming a large elliptical blotch located between the dorsal one-fifth and two-fifths, margined with silvery white scales except on the dorsum and yellowish brown in the middle of the cell. The hindwings are greyish brown.

== Etymology ==
The species name refers to the costa arched in the basal three-fourths in the male genitalia and is derived from Latin arcuatus.
