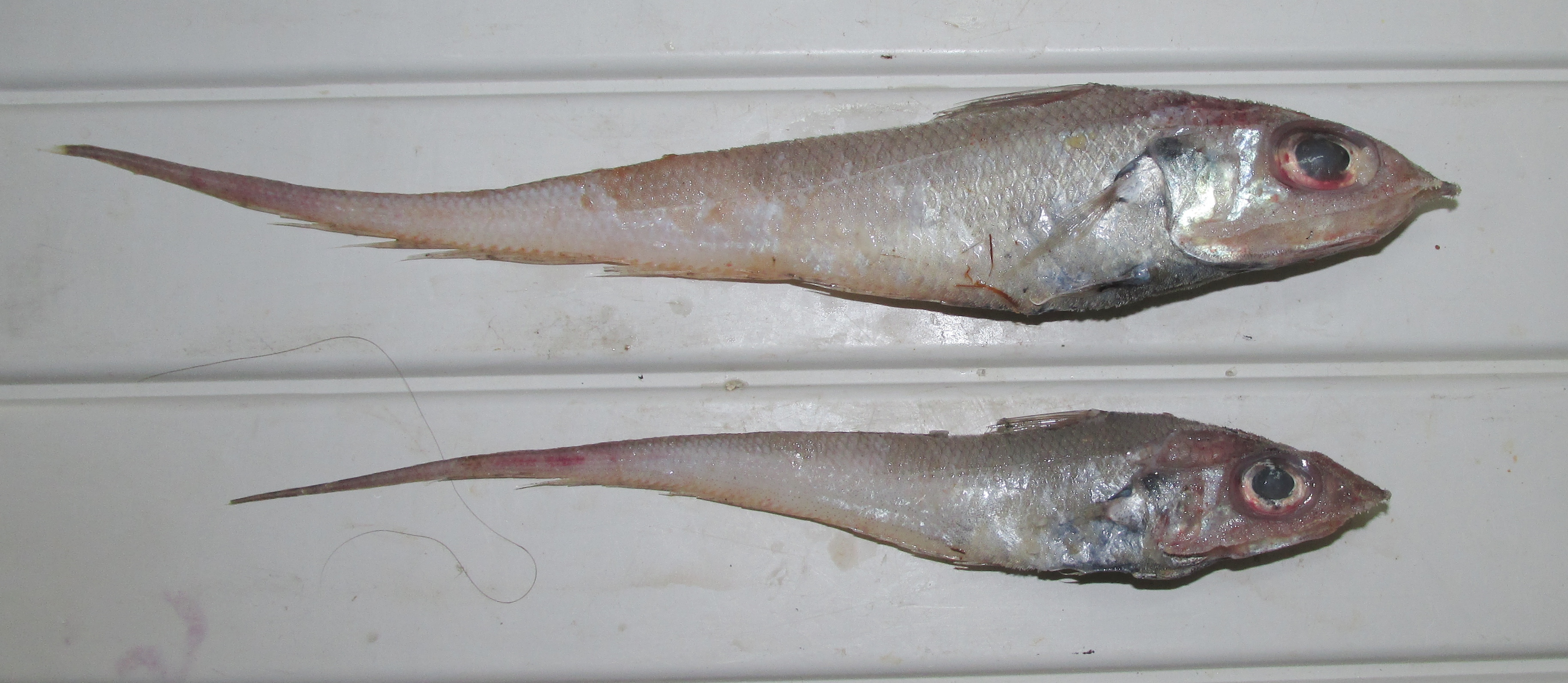

Conservation status
- Least Concern (IUCN 3.1)

Scientific classification
- Kingdom: Animalia
- Phylum: Chordata
- Class: Actinopterygii
- Order: Gadiformes
- Family: Macrouridae
- Genus: Coelorinchus
- Species: C. caelorhincus

Binomial name
- Coelorinchus caelorhincus (Risso, 1810)

Synonyms
- List: *Caelorhynchus caelorhynchus Risso, 1810; Caelorinchus caelorhincus Risso, 1810; Caelorinchus caelorhincus caelorhincus Risso, 1810; Caelorinchus caelorinchus Risso, 1810; Caelorinchus caelorinchus caelorinchus Risso, 1810; Caelorinchus laville Giorna, 1809; Coelorhinchus caelorhinchus Risso, 1810; Coelorhinchus laville Risso, 1810; Coelorhynchus atlanticus Lowe, 1839; Coelorhynchus coelorhynchus Risso, 1810; Coelorhynchus coelorhynchus coelorhynchus Risso, 1810; Coelorhynchus coelorhyncus Risso, 1810; Coelorinchus caelorhinchus Risso, 1810; Coelorinchus coelorhinchus Risso, 1810; Coelorinchus laville Giorna, 1809; Lepidoleprus caelorhincus Risso, 1810; Macrourus atlanticus Lowe, 1839; Macrurus carminatus Risso, 1810; Macrurus coelorhynchus Risso, 1810

= Hollowsnout grenadier =

Species of ray-finned fish

The hollowsnout grenadier (Coelorinchus caelorhincus), also called the blackspot grenadier, is a species of fish in the family Macrouridae.

The specific name derives from Greek κοῖλος (koilos, "hollow") and ῥύγχος (rhynchos, "snout").

== Description ==
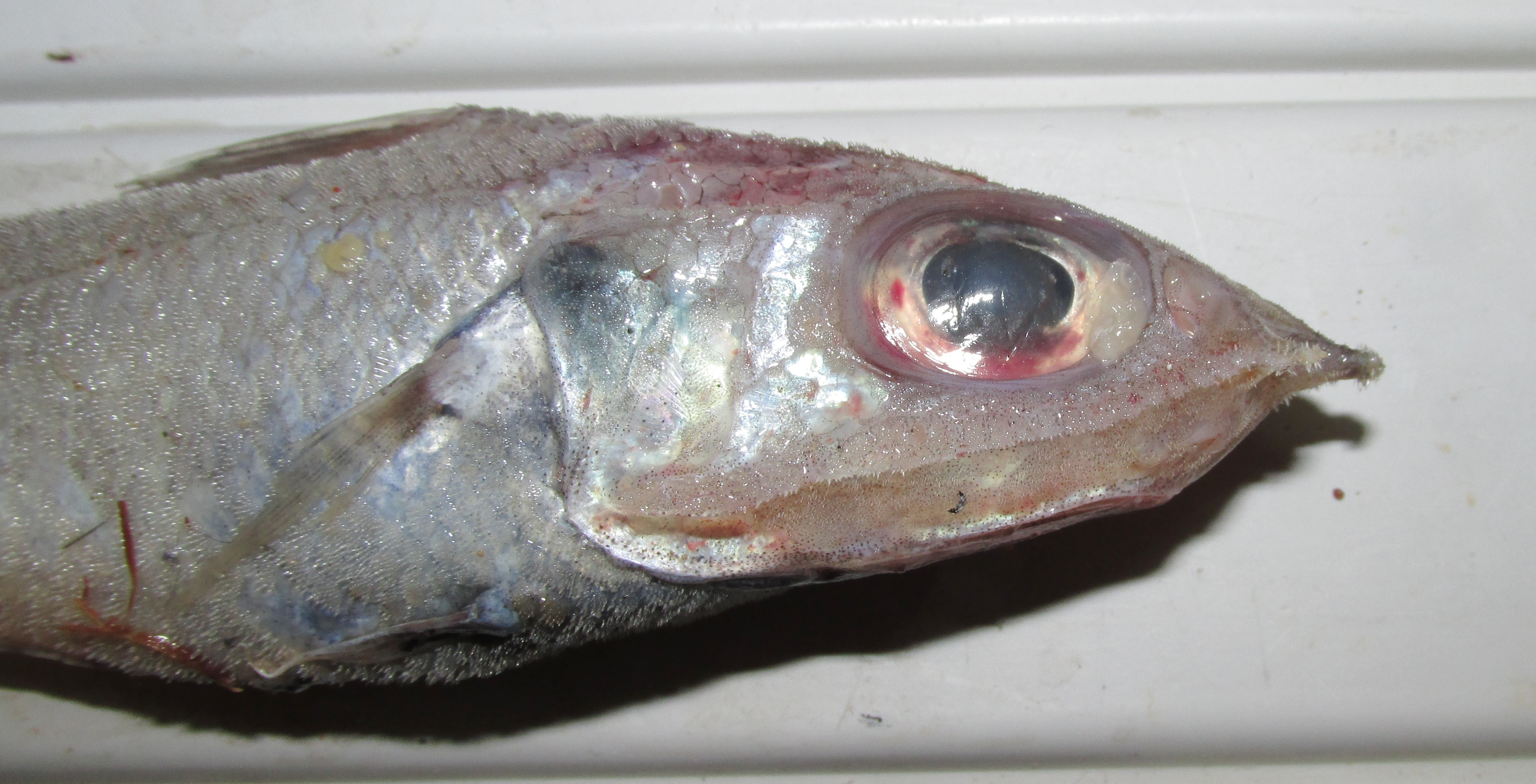
Closeup of head

The hollowsnout grenadier is silvery in color. It is up to 48 cm (19 in) in length.

== Habitat and human interaction ==
The hollowsnout grenadier lives in the Atlantic Ocean and Mediterranean Sea; it is benthopelagic, living at depths of 90–1,485 m (300–4,870 ft). Coelorinchus caelorhincus population distribution shows larger individuals normally disperse in deeper water, and younger fry populate shallower water. The species has been documented as an abundant by-catch by deep-sea trawling for both shrimp and lobster and is generally not considered for human consumption.

== Feeding behaviour ==
The hollowsnout grenadier feeds on various marine invertebrates and vertebrates. They primarily target benthic crustaceans, (specifically amphipods, isopods, tanaids) and polychaetes, but will still hunt teleost fish and certain cephalopod species. It has been shown that C. caelorhincus will change its feeding behavior seasonally, and will rarely target more intimidating prey such as certain fish and cephalopods in colder climates.
