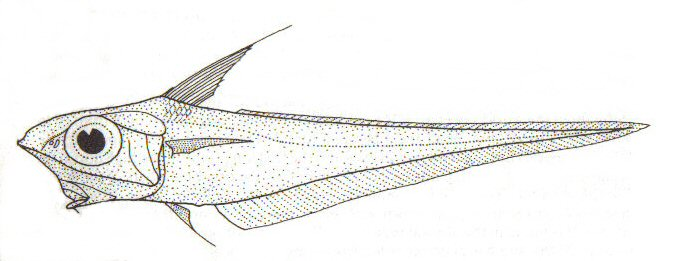
- Drawing by Dr Tony Ayling

Scientific classification
- Kingdom: Animalia
- Phylum: Chordata
- Class: Actinopterygii
- Division: Teleostei
- Order: Gadiformes
- Suborder: Macrouroidei
- Family: Macrouridae
- Genus: Coelorinchus
- Species: C. oliverianus

Binomial name
- Coelorinchus oliverianus Phillipps, 1927

= Hawknose grenadier =

Species of fish

The hawknose grenadier (Coelorinchus oliverianus), also known as Oliver's rattail, is a species of rattail endemic to New Zealand. It is widespread around the whole country, including the Chatham Rise, Challenger Plateau, and Campbell Pleateau, and has been collected from depths of 400-800 m.

It lives at depths of between 80 and 1300 m.

The species name oliverianus is in reference to Dr Walter Reginald Brook Oliver. Originally from Australia, Walter Oliver was a New Zealand naturalist, malacologist, ornithologist, and museum curator.

Its length is between 20 and 35 cm. Maximum size has been recorded as 45 cm total length.
