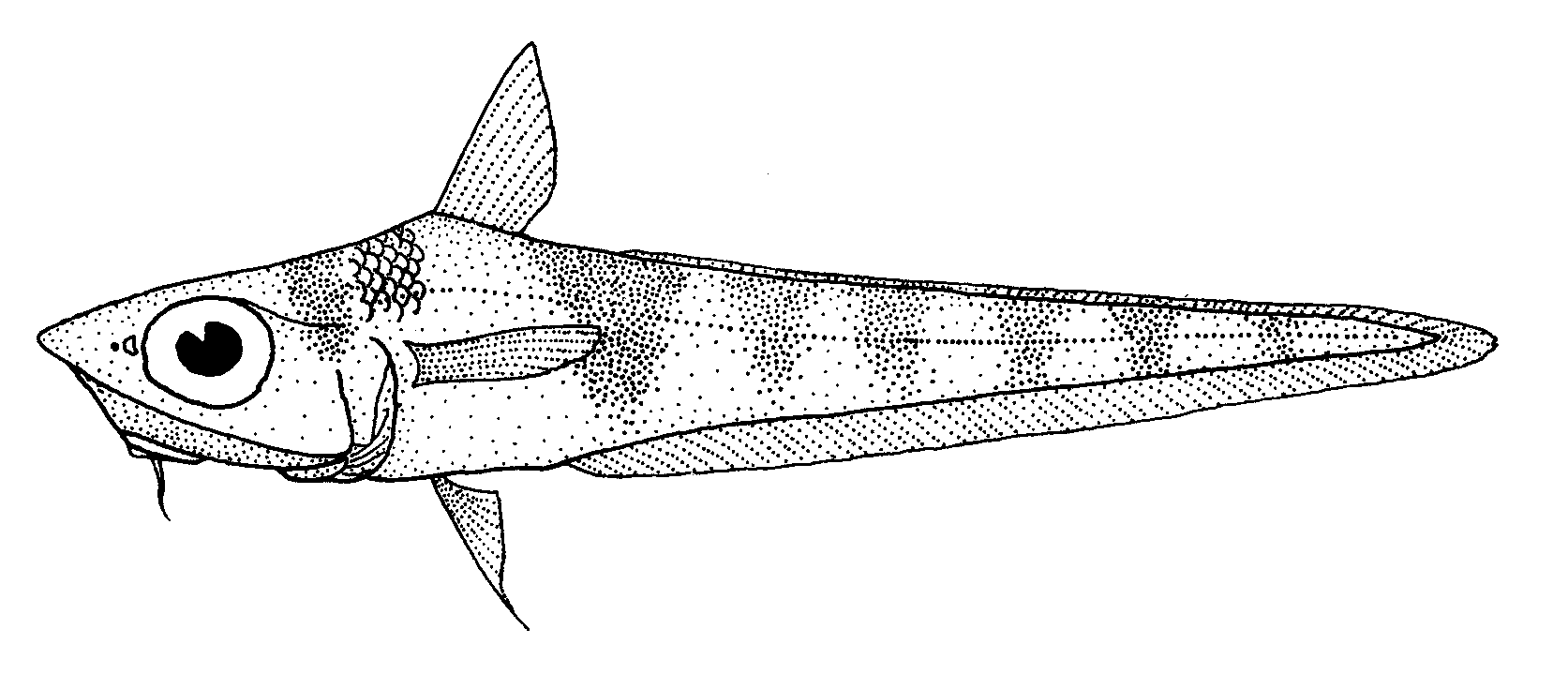
- Drawing by Dr Tony Ayling

Scientific classification
- Kingdom: Animalia
- Phylum: Chordata
- Class: Actinopterygii
- Division: Teleostei
- Order: Gadiformes
- Suborder: Macrouroidei
- Family: Macrouridae
- Genus: Coelorinchus
- Species: C. fasciatus

Binomial name
- Coelorinchus fasciatus (Günther, 1878)

= Banded whiptail =

Species of fish

The banded whiptail (Coelorinchus fasciatus) is a species of rattail found with a circumpolar distribution in the Great Southern Ocean at depths of between 70 and 1,100 m. Its length is between 25 and 45 cm.
