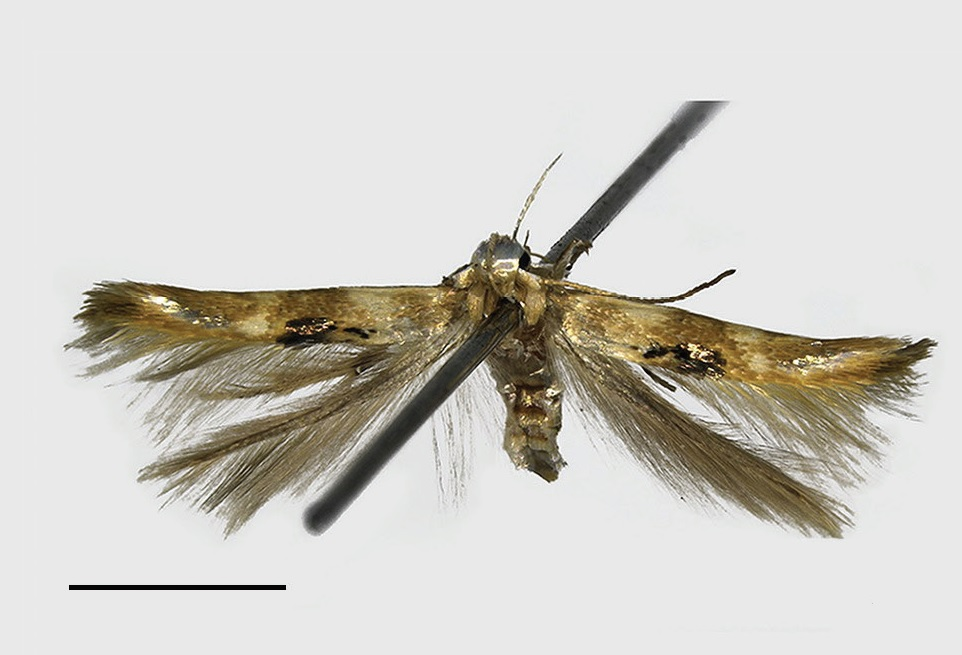

Scientific classification
- Domain: Eukaryota
- Kingdom: Animalia
- Phylum: Arthropoda
- Class: Insecta
- Order: Lepidoptera
- Family: Stathmopodidae
- Genus: Hieromantis
- Species: H. rectangula

Binomial name
- Hieromantis rectangula Guan & Li, 2015

= Hieromantis rectangula =

Species of moth

Hieromantis rectangula is a moth of the Stathmopodidae family. It is found in China (Fujian, Hainan, Zhejiang).

The wingspan is 6−8.5 mm. The forewings are creamy white, with scattered yellowish brown scales, ochreous yellow from the dorsal two-thirds along the dorsum to the apex. There is a trapezoidal ochreous yellow patch extending from between the costal one-third and two-fifths to between the dorsal one-fourth and half. There is an inverted triangular ochreous yellow patch, extending from between the costal three-fifths and four-fifths to the lower angle of the cell, bearing an ill-defined black dot posteriorly, with a narrow silvery grey band placed along its outer margin. The dorsum has an ovate dark blotch located between the basal one-fourth and two-fifths, consisting of tufts of shining purple grey scales, its anterior margin crossing two-fifths the width of the wing. Near its inner side is a black spot. The hindwings are greyish brown.

== Etymology ==
The species name refers to the rectangular juxta in the male genitalia and is derived from Latin rectangulus.
