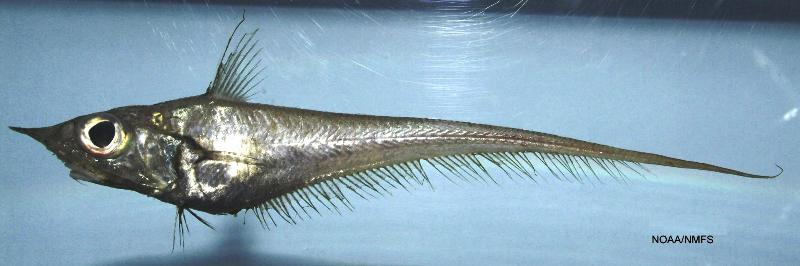

Scientific classification
- Kingdom: Animalia
- Phylum: Chordata
- Class: Actinopterygii
- Order: Gadiformes
- Suborder: Macrouroidei
- Family: Macrouridae
- Genus: Coelorinchus
- Species: C. caribbaeus

Binomial name
- Coelorinchus caribbaeus Goode & Bean, 1896

= Coelorinchus caribbaeus =

Blackfin grenadier

Species of fish

Coelorinchus caribbaeus, the blackfin grenadier, is a member of the family Macrouridae. It is a marine benthopelagic rattail. It has a wide range in the western tropical Atlantic. It lives in depths of 200 meters to 700 meters.

== Description ==
The blackfin grenadier has two dorsal spines and between 25 and 39 dorsal rays. It has a large head, large eyes, and a pointed snout. The body tapers into a posterior point starting behind the first dorsal fin. The scales of the blackfin grenadier are covered in fine, conical spinules except on the posterior and ventral parts of the trunk and tail. It has a swarthy color overall with a silvery tint over the abdomen and gill covers. They can reach a maximum length of 45 cm but are generally 30 cm in length.

== Habitat ==
The blackfin grenadier lives in deep water marine habitats. Its depth range is 200 to 700 meters, but it is most commonly found in depths of 300 to 400 meters.

== Distribution ==
The blackfin grenadier is distributed throughout the Western Central Atlantic. Its range is from Cape Hatteras, USA to northern Brazil. They are absent in the straits of Florida and uncommon along the Antillean Chain.

== Etymology ==
Coelorinchus comes from the Greek words "koilos" meaning hollow and "rhynhchos" meaning jaw.
