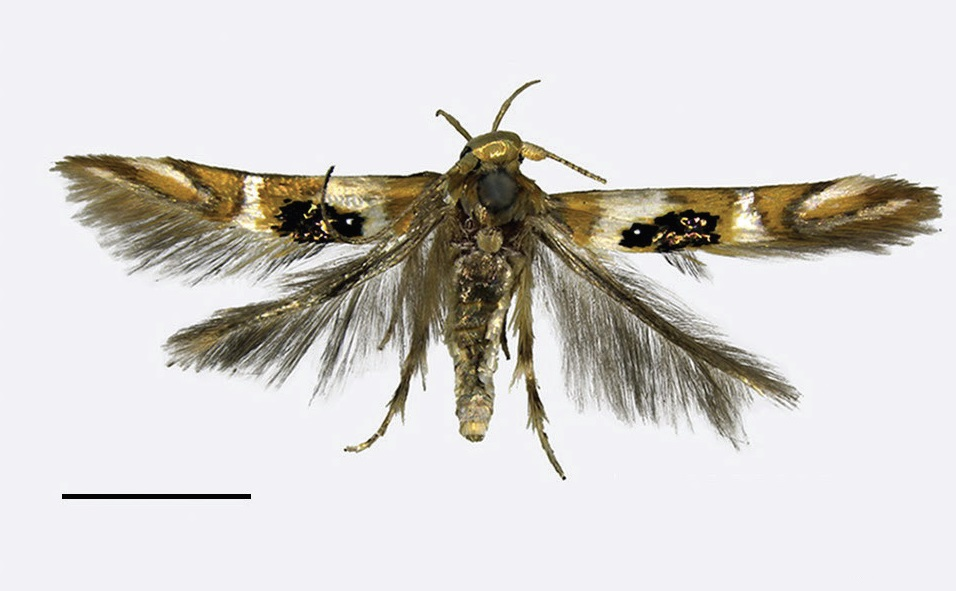

Scientific classification
- Kingdom: Animalia
- Phylum: Arthropoda
- Clade: Pancrustacea
- Class: Insecta
- Order: Lepidoptera
- Family: Stathmopodidae
- Genus: Hieromantis
- Species: H. kurokoi

Binomial name
- Hieromantis kurokoi Yasuda, 1988

Synonyms
- Hieromantis nordella Sinev, 1988

= Hieromantis kurokoi =

Species of moth

Hieromantis kurokoi is a moth of the Stathmopodidae family. It is found in China (Anhui, Chongqing, Fujian, Gansu, Guangxi, Hainan, Hebei, Henan, Hubei, Hunan, Jiangxi, Shaanxi, Shanxi, Tianjin, Zhejiang), Japan (Honshu, Kyushu) and Russia.

The wingspan is 6−11 mm. The species is similar to Hieromantis ephodophora, having similar forewing markings, but kurokoi can be separated by the valva having a rounded cucullus in the male genitalia.

The larvae feed on Cuscuta japonica.
