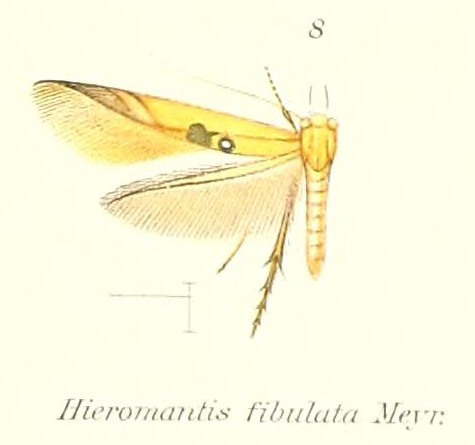

Scientific classification
- Kingdom: Animalia
- Phylum: Arthropoda
- Class: Insecta
- Order: Lepidoptera
- Family: Stathmopodidae
- Genus: Hieromantis
- Species: H. fibulata

Binomial name
- Hieromantis fibulata Meyrick, 1906

= Hieromantis fibulata =

Species of moth

Hieromantis fibulata is a moth of the family Stathmopodidae first described by Edward Meyrick in 1906. It is found in Sri Lanka.
