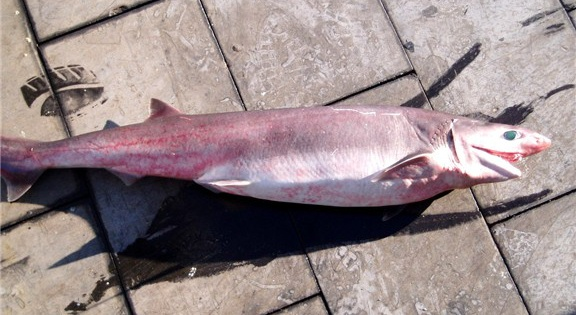

Conservation status
- Near Threatened (IUCN 3.1)

Scientific classification
- Kingdom: Animalia
- Phylum: Chordata
- Class: Chondrichthyes
- Subclass: Elasmobranchii
- Division: Selachii
- Order: Hexanchiformes
- Family: Hexanchidae
- Genus: Heptranchias
- Species: H. perlo

Binomial name
- Heptranchias perlo (Bonnaterre, 1788)
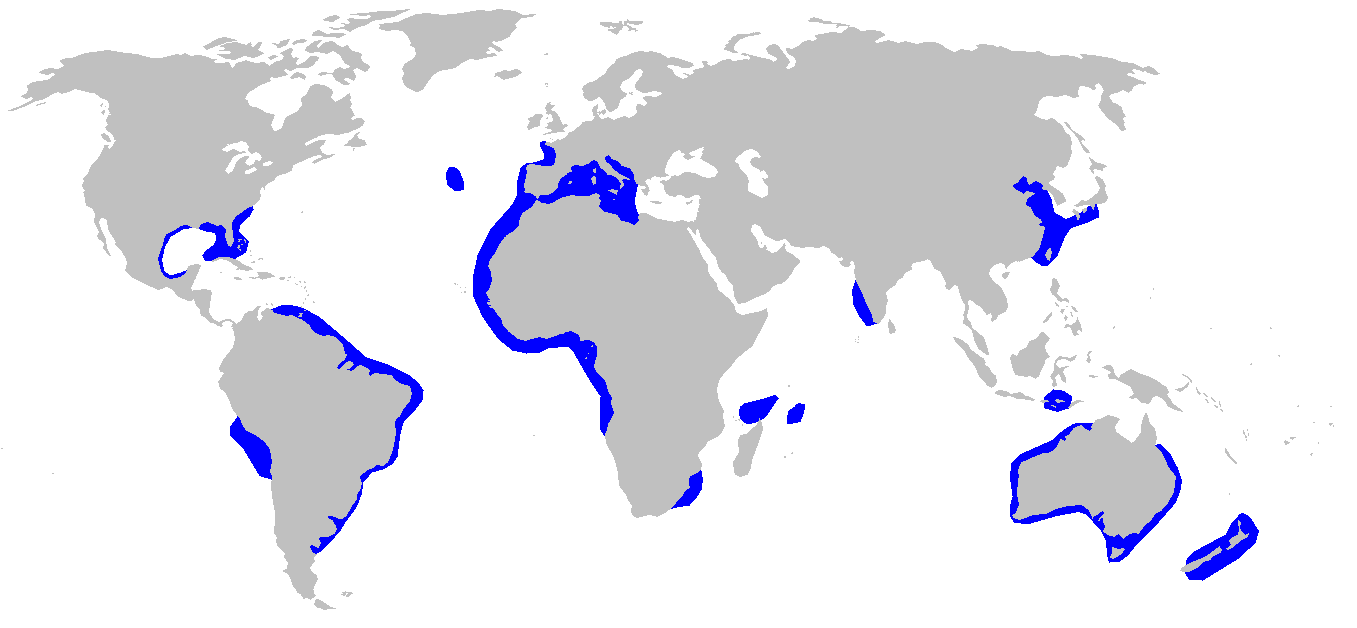
- Range of the sharpnose sevengill shark

Synonyms
- Heptranchias angio Costa, 1857; Heptranchias dakini Whitley, 1931; Heptranchias deani Jordan & Starks, 1901; Heptrancus angio Costa, 1857; Notidanus cinereus pristiurus Bellotti, 1878; Squalus cinereus Gmelin, 1789; Squalus perlo Bonnaterre, 1788

= Sharpnose sevengill shark =

Sharpnose sevengill shark Temporal range: 61–0 Ma Danian to Present

Species of shark

The sharpnose sevengill shark (Heptranchias perlo), also known as one-finned shark, perlon shark, sevengill cow shark, sharpsnouted sevengill or slender sevengill, is a species of shark in the family Hexanchidae, and the only living species in the genus Heptranchias. Found almost circumglobally in deep water, it is one of the few species of sharks with seven pairs of gill slits as opposed to the usual five. The other shark species with seven gill slits is the broadnose sevengill shark. Though small, this shark is an active, voracious predator of invertebrates and fish. When caught, this species is notably defensive and will attempt to bite. It is of minor commercial importance.

== Taxonomy ==
The genus name Heptranchias is from the Greek heptra meaning "seven arms", and agchein meaning "throttle", referring to this shark's seven pairs of gill slits. Other common names for this species include one-finned shark, perlon shark, sevengill cow shark, sevengilled Mediterranean shark, sevengilled shark, sharpnose seven-gill shark, snouted sevengill shark and slender sevengill shark. Some authors believe this species is distinct enough to merit its own family, Heptranchiidae.

== Distribution and habitat ==
The sharpnose sevengill shark is uncommon, but widely distributed in the tropical and temperate regions of all oceans except for the northeastern Pacific Ocean. It is found from North Carolina to Cuba, including the northern Gulf of Mexico, and from Venezuela to Argentina in the western Atlantic. In the eastern Atlantic, it occurs from Morocco to Namibia, including the Mediterranean Sea. It is reported from the Indian Ocean off southwestern India, Aldabra Island, southern Mozambique, and South Africa. In the Pacific Ocean, it is known from Japan to China, Indonesia, Australia, New Zealand, and northern Chile.

This is a demersal to semipelagic species usually captured at a depth of 300–600 m (980–1,970 ft), but is occasionally found close to the surface (though these reports may represent misidentifications) or down to 1,000 m (3,280 ft). It is mainly found on the outer continental shelf and upper continental slope, and may aggregate around seamounts.

== Description ==
Usually measuring 60–120 cm (2.0–3.9 ft) long, sharpnose sevengill sharks attain a maximum length of 1.4 m (4.6 ft). This species has a slender, fusiform body with a narrow, pointed head. The eyes are very large and fluoresce green in live specimens. The mouth is narrow and strongly curved, containing 9–11 teeth on either side of the upper jaw and five teeth on either side of the lower. The upper teeth are narrow and hook-shaped with small lateral cusps, while the lower teeth are broad and comb-shaped (except for a symmetrical symphysial tooth). Unlike most other sharks, there are seven pairs of gill slits that extend onto the throat.

A single small dorsal fin is located behind the pelvic fins, with a straight front margin, narrowly rounded tip, and concave rear margin. The pectoral fins are small with a weakly convex outer margin. The anal fin is small with nearly straight margins. The caudal peduncle is long, and the distance between the dorsal fin origin and the caudal fin is more than twice the dorsal fin base. The closely overlapping dermal denticles are very thin and transparent; each is longer than it is broad, bearing a distinct median ridge and two lateral ridges ending in marginal teeth. The coloration is brownish gray to olive above and lighter below; some individuals have dark blotches on the body or light posterior fin margins. Juveniles have dark blotches on the flank and dark tips on the dorsal fin and upper caudal lobe.

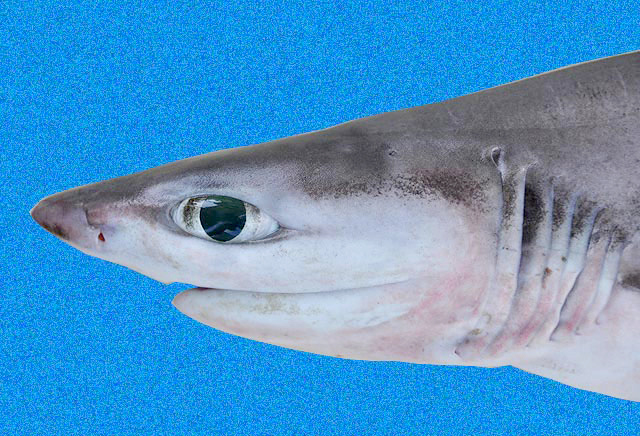
Head

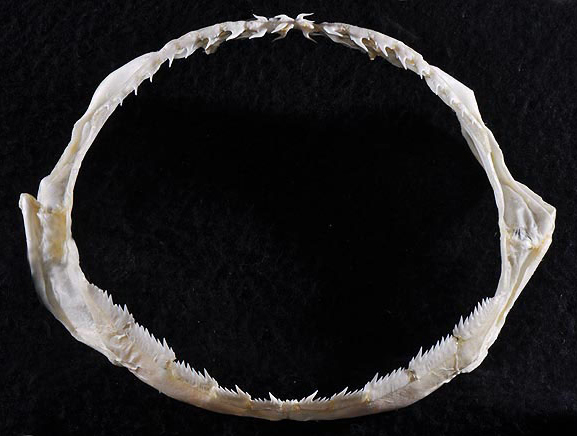
Jaws

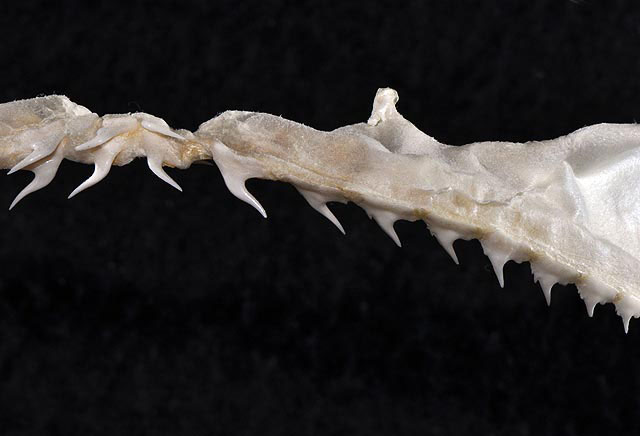
Upper teeth

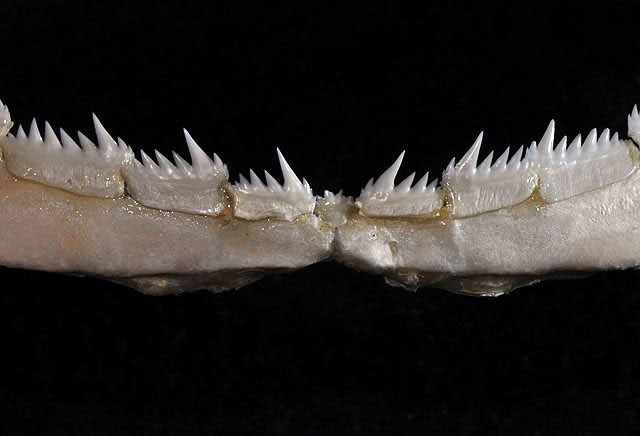
Lower teeth

== Biology and ecology ==
Despite its relatively small size, the sharpnose sevengill shark is considered a top predator in the ecosystem it inhabits. At the Great Meteor Seamount in the eastern Atlantic, this species feeds primarily on teleosts and cephalopods, and to a lesser extent on small cartilaginous fishes. Off Tunisia, crustaceans are the second-most common prey taken after teleosts. Off Australia, this species consumes mostly teleosts, with smaller individuals taking mainly Lepidorhynchus denticulatus and larger individuals taking increasing numbers of snake mackerels and cutlassfishes. It is a strong-swimming species, with feeding and activity level increasing at night. This species may be preyed upon by larger sharks. Known parasites of the sharpnose sevengill shark include nematodes in the genera Anisakis and Contracaecum, and the cestode Crossobothrium dohrnii.

Reproduction is ovoviviparous, with no apparent reproductive season. The females give birth to litters of 9–20 pups; the newborns measure about 26 cm (10 in) long. Males mature at 75–85 cm (2.46–2.79 ft) long and females at 90–100 cm (3.0–3.3 ft). The onset of sexual maturation in males may be marked by the formation of mucus on the tips of the claspers.

== Relationship to humans ==
The sharpnose sevengill shark is reasonably small and is located in generally deep water, and these characteristics classify this shark as harmless to humans. Small to moderate numbers of sharpnose sevengill sharks are captured as bycatch in certain deepwater commercial fisheries on longlines or in trawls. They are used for fishmeal and liver oil; the meat is said to be of good quality, but the flesh is considered to be mildly poisonous when consumed. When captured, it is very active and quick to bite, but it does not pose a substantial threat to people due to its small size. It has occasionally been kept in captivity in Japan.

== Conservation status ==
Some concern exists that populations of this slow-reproducing species may be declining in areas of sustained deepwater fishing, and it has been assessed as Near Threatened by the World Conservation Union. In June 2018 the New Zealand Department of Conservation classified the sharpnose sevengill shark as "At Risk – Naturally Uncommon" with the qualifiers "Data Poor" and "Secure Overseas" under the New Zealand Threat Classification System.

== See also ==
- List of prehistoric cartilaginous fish genera
