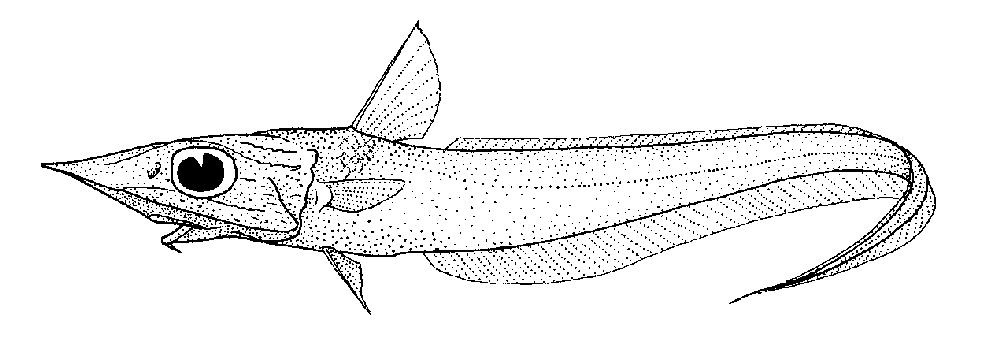
- Drawing by Dr Tony Ayling

Scientific classification
- Domain: Eukaryota
- Kingdom: Animalia
- Phylum: Chordata
- Class: Actinopterygii
- Order: Gadiformes
- Family: Macrouridae
- Subfamily: Macrourinae
- Genus: Coelorinchus
- Species: C. kaiyomaru

Binomial name
- Coelorinchus kaiyomaru T. Arai & Iwamoto, 1979

= Campbell whiptail =

Species of fish

The Campbell whiptail, kaiyomaru whiptail or kaiyomaru rattail (Coelorinchus kaiyomaru) is a species of rattail found around the globe in the southern oceans, at depths of between 600 and 1,150 m. Its length is between 20 and 40 cm.
