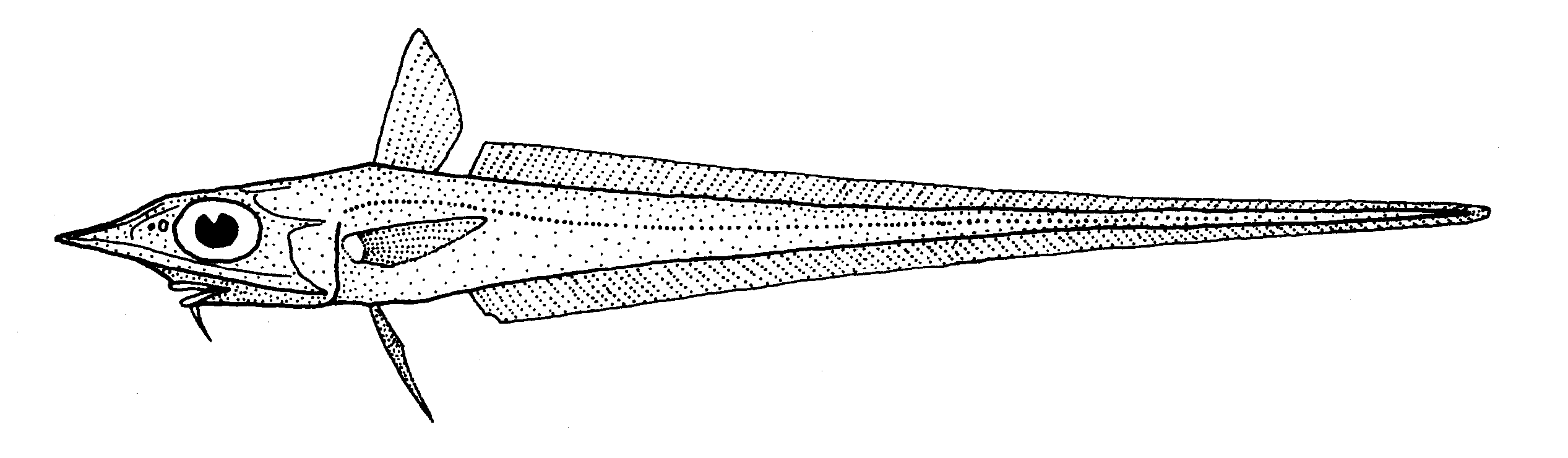
- Drawing by Dr Tony Ayling

Scientific classification
- Kingdom: Animalia
- Phylum: Chordata
- Class: Actinopterygii
- Order: Gadiformes
- Suborder: Macrouroidei
- Family: Macrouridae
- Genus: Coelorinchus
- Species: C. innotabilis

Binomial name
- Coelorinchus innotabilis McCulloch, 1907

= Notable whiptail =

Species of fish

The notable whiptail, notable rattail or longnose rattail (Coelorinchus innotabilis) is a species of rattail found around southern Australia, and New Zealand, at depths of between 500 and 1,500 m. Its length is between 15 and 32 cm.
