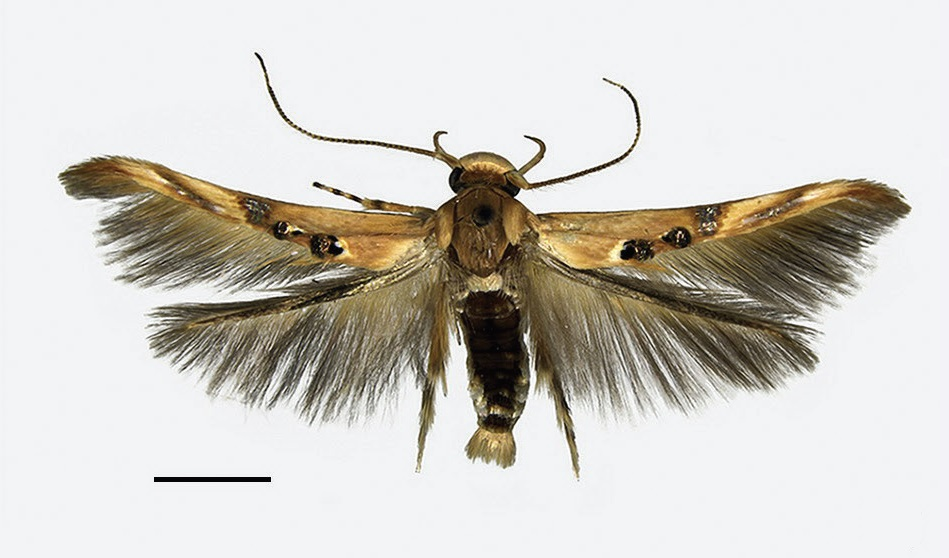

Scientific classification
- Kingdom: Animalia
- Phylum: Arthropoda
- Class: Insecta
- Order: Lepidoptera
- Family: Stathmopodidae
- Genus: Hieromantis
- Species: H. phaedora

Binomial name
- Hieromantis phaedora Meyrick, 1929

= Hieromantis phaedora =

Species of moth

Hieromantis phaedora is a moth of the family Stathmopodidae. It is found in China (Fujian, Hainan) and the Andaman Islands.

The wingspan is 14−15 mm.
