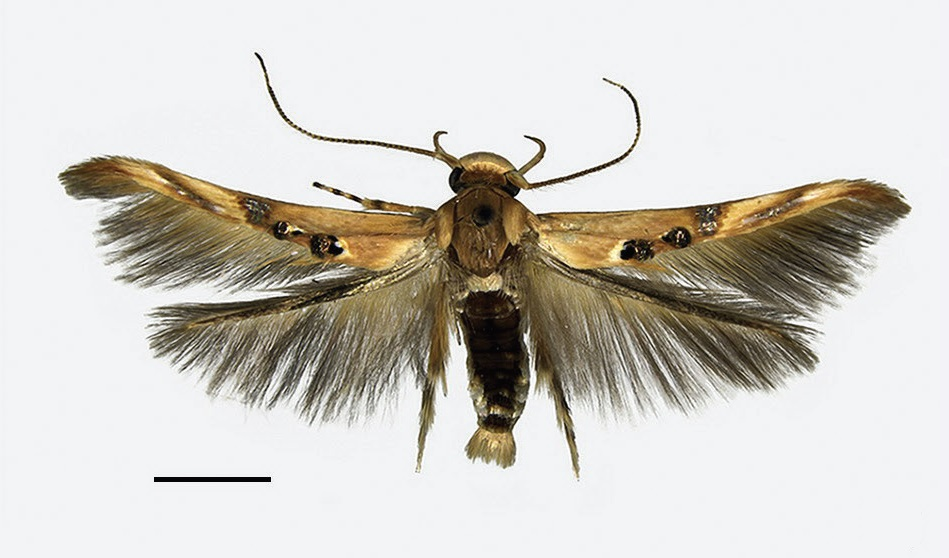
- Hieromantis phaeodora

Scientific classification
- Kingdom: Animalia
- Phylum: Arthropoda
- Clade: Pancrustacea
- Class: Insecta
- Order: Lepidoptera
- Family: Stathmopodidae
- Genus: Hieromantis; Meyrick, 1897

= Hieromantis =

Genus of moths

Hieromantis is a genus of moths in the Stathmopodidae family .

== Species ==
- Hieromantis albata (Meyrick, 1913)
- Hieromantis amblyptera Meyrick, 1927
- Hieromantis ancylogramma Meyrick, 1933
- Hieromantis arcuata Guan & Li, 2015
- Hieromantis chrysoleuca Meyrick, 1913
- Hieromantis deprivata Meyrick, 1927
- Hieromantis ephodophora Meyrick, 1897
- Hieromantis fibulata Meyrick, 1906
- Hieromantis inhonorata Meyrick, 1927
- Hieromantis ioxysta Meyrick, 1913
- Hieromantis kurokoi Yasuda, 1988
- Hieromantis makiosana Yasuda, 1988
- Hieromantis munerata Meyrick, 1924
- Hieromantis phaedora Meyrick, 1929
- Hieromantis praemiata Meyrick, 1922
- Hieromantis puerensis Guan & Li, 2015
- Hieromantis rectangula Guan & Li, 2015
- Hieromantis resplendens Bradley, 1957
- Hieromantis sheni Li & Wang, 2002
- Hieromantis tribolopa Meyrick, 1924
