= Uitpa Formation =

Geologic formation in Colombia

- Stratigraphic range: Aquitanian-Burdigalian; ~23–17.9 Ma
- Type: Geological formation
- Unit of: Cocinetas Basin
- Underlies: Jimol Formation
- Overlies: Siamaná Formation
- Thickness: up to 230 m (750 ft)

Lithology
- Primary: Mudstone
- Other: Sandstone

Location
- Coordinates: 11°58′00″N 71°22′43″W
- Region: La Guajira; Caribbean region
- Country: Colombia

Type section
- Named for: Uitpa
- Named by: Renz
- Location: Uribia
- Year defined: 1960
- Coordinates: 11°58′00″N 71°22′43″W
- Region: La Guajira
- Country: Colombia
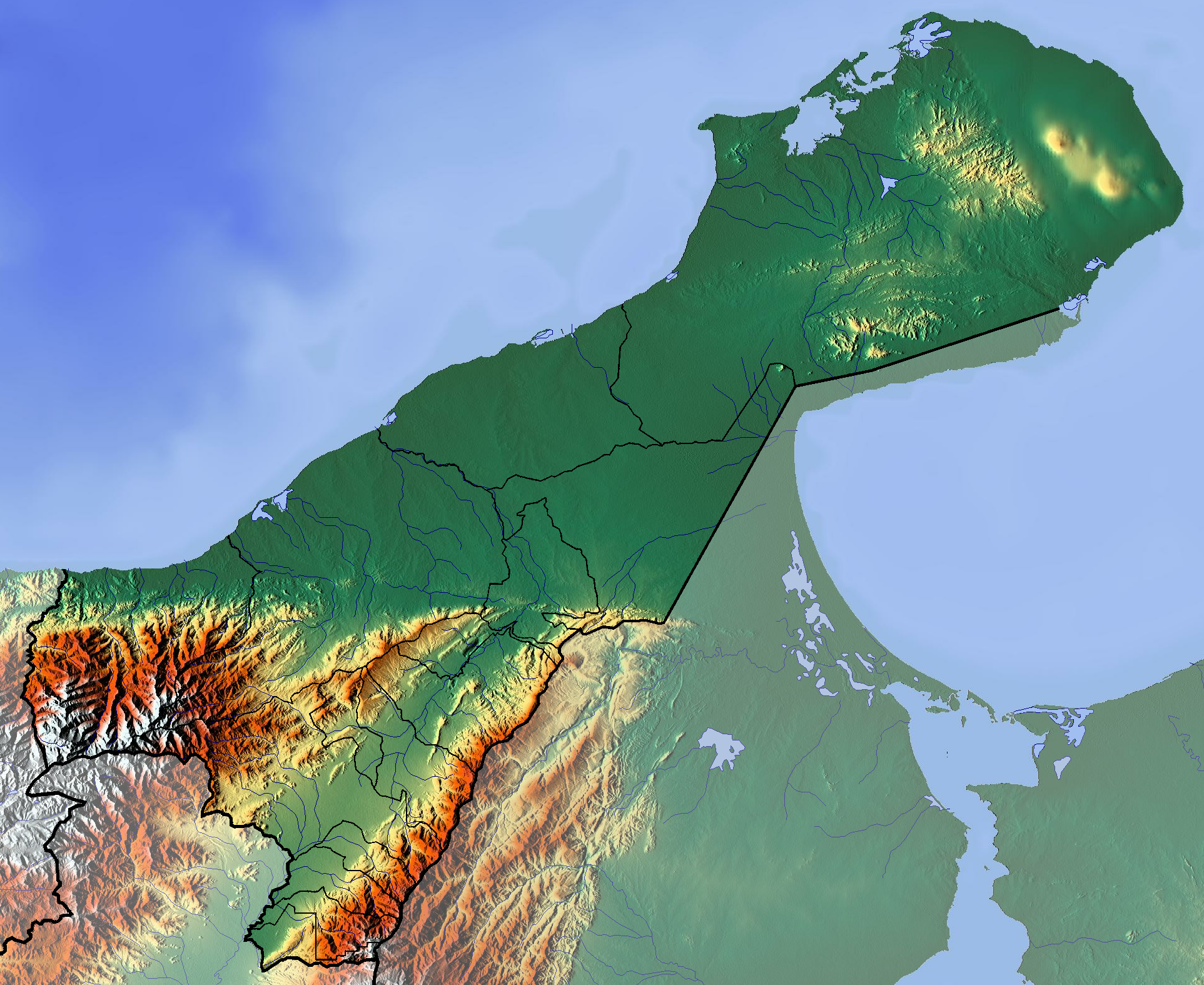
- Type locality of the formation in La Guajira

The Uitpa Formation (Spanish: Formación Uitpa, E3u) is a fossiliferous geological formation of the Cocinetas Basin in the northernmost department of La Guajira. The formation consists of calcareous mudstones interbedded with lithic sandstones. The Uitpa Formation dates to the Neogene period; Aquitanian to Burdigalian stages, corresponding to the Colhuehuapian in the SALMA classification, and has a maximum thickness of 230 metres (750 ft).

== Etymology ==
The formation was defined by Renz in 1960 and named after Uitpa.

== Description ==
=== Lithologies ===
The Uitpa Formation consists of calcareous mudstones interbedded with lithic sandstones.

=== Stratigraphy and depositional environment ===
The Uitpa Formation overlies the Siamaná Formation and is overlain by the Jimol Formation. The age has been estimated to be Early Miocene, corresponding to the Colhuehuapian in the SALMA classification. The formation has been deposited in an open to deep marine environment.

=== Petroleum geology ===
The Uitpa Formation is a reservoir and seal rock formation in the Guajira Basin.

=== Fossil content ===
Group	Fossils	Notes
Fishes	Heptranchias cf. howellii, Centrophorus sp., Dalatias cf. licha, Pristiophorus sp., Isurus cf. oxyrinchus, Carcharocles sp., Alopias cf. superciliosus, Hemipristis serra, Carcharhinus gibbesii, Sphyrna laevissima, Mobula sp., Lamniformes indet., Teleostei indet.	
Invertebrates	Turritella sp., Xenophora sp., Architectonica nobilis, Glossaulax sp., Orthaulax sp., Gorgasina sp., Adrana sp., Saccella sp., Limopsis sp., Mimachlamys canalis, Cyclopecten sp., Propeamussium sp., Ostrea sp., Pteria sp., Lucinoma sp., Psammacoma sp., Chionopsis sp., Antalis sp., Fissidentalium sp., Turridae indet.	

== See also ==
Geology of the Eastern Hills
Cesar-Ranchería Basin
Honda Group
Abanico Formation
