= Coelorinchus longissimus =

Scientific classification
- Kingdom: Animalia
- Phylum: Chordata
- Class: Actinopterygii
- Order: Gadiformes
- Suborder: Macrouroidei
- Family: Macrouridae
- Genus: Coelorinchus
- Species: C. longissimus

Binomial name
- Coelorinchus longissimus Matsubara, 1943

Species of fish

Coelorinchus longissimus is a species of rattail; this deep-water fish is found in the waters around Taiwan and southern Japan.

This elongated fish grows to a length of about 36 cm. It has a large head with oval eyes and a small inferior mouth with conical teeth. It has a long bioluminescent organ in front of the anus.
