= Coelorinchus asteroides =

Scientific classification
- Kingdom: Animalia
- Phylum: Chordata
- Class: Actinopterygii
- Order: Gadiformes
- Suborder: Macrouroidei
- Family: Macrouridae
- Genus: Coelorinchus
- Species: C. asteroids

Binomial name
- Coelorinchus asteroids Okamura, 1963

Species of fish

Coelorinchus asteroides is a species of rattail. This is a deep-water fish found in the waters around Taiwan and southern Japan.

This species grows to a length of about 40 cm. It can be distinguished by its short, broad snout with a sharp rostral spine, conical premaxillary teeth, large, hexagonal, deciduous body scales and short bioluminescent organ in front of the anal fin.
