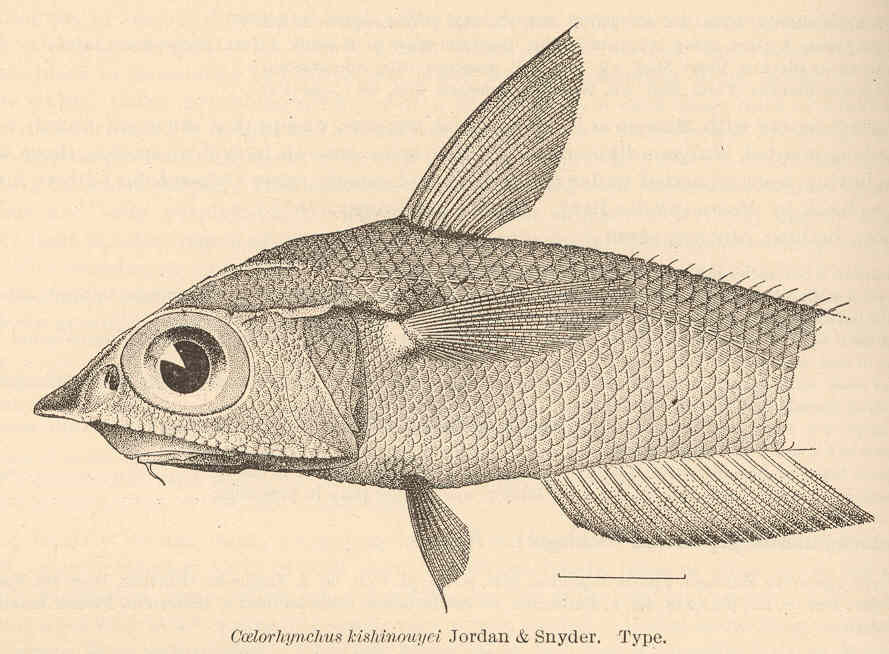

Scientific classification
- Kingdom: Animalia
- Phylum: Chordata
- Class: Actinopterygii
- Order: Gadiformes
- Suborder: Macrouroidei
- Family: Macrouridae
- Genus: Coelorinchus
- Species: C. kishinouyei

Binomial name
- Coelorinchus kishinouyei Jordan & Snyder, 1900

= Coelorinchus kishinouyei =

Species of fish

Coelorinchus kishinouyei, the Mugura grenadier, is a species of rattail that occurs in the waters around Japan and Taiwan where it is found at depths of 250 to 450 metres (820 to 1,480 ft). This species grows to a length of 36 centimetres (14 in) TL and is of minor importance to local commercial fisheries.

The species name is a tribute to Japanese fisheries biologist Kamakichi Kishinouye (岸上 鎌吉, 1867–1929).
