= Hieromantis ioxysta =

Scientific classification
- Kingdom: Animalia
- Phylum: Arthropoda
- Class: Insecta
- Order: Lepidoptera
- Family: Stathmopodidae
- Genus: Hieromantis
- Species: H. ioxysta

Binomial name
- Hieromantis ioxysta Meyrick, 1913

Species of moth

Hieromantis ioxysta is a moth of the family Stathmopodidae first described by Edward Meyrick in 1913. It is found in Sri Lanka.
