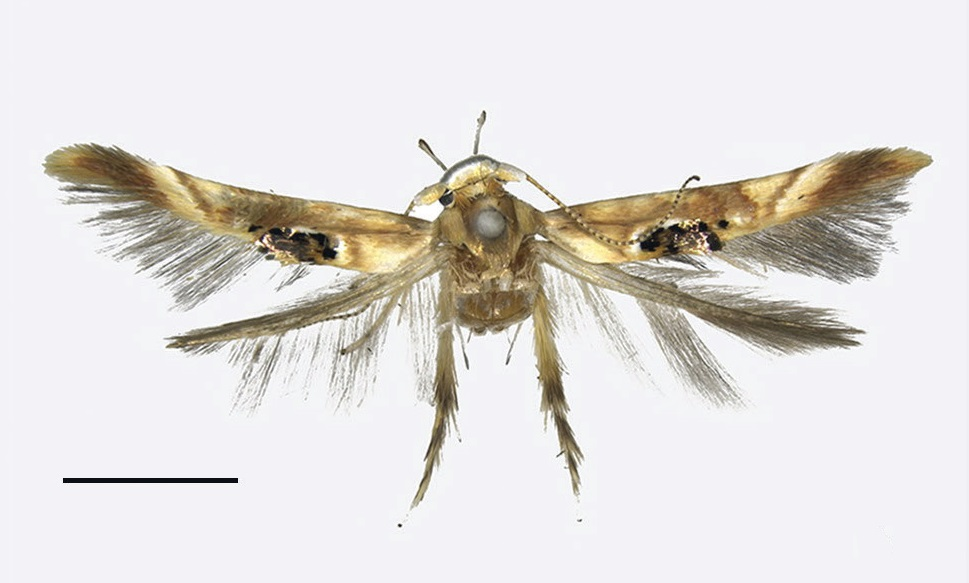

Scientific classification
- Domain: Eukaryota
- Kingdom: Animalia
- Phylum: Arthropoda
- Class: Insecta
- Order: Lepidoptera
- Family: Stathmopodidae
- Genus: Hieromantis
- Species: H. puerensis

Binomial name
- Hieromantis puerensis Guan & Li, 2015

= Hieromantis puerensis =

Species of moth

Hieromantis puerensis is a moth of the Stathmopodidae family. It is found in Yunnan, China.

The wingspan is 9−10.5 mm. The forewings are brown, the distal one-fifth ochreous brown. Below the costal margin are three pale ochreous yellow shades in the basal half and there is a broad greyish brown band extending from the costal half slightly obliquely outward to above the distal end of the fold, ending in a silvery white spot, edged with a narrow ochreous brown band along its inner and outer margins, with a rounded black dot placed at the end of the inner band above the fold, its inner side with a few silvery white scales. There is an inverted trapezoidal pale ochreous yellow patch located between the outer band and the costal four-fifths, its posterior margin reaching beyond the end of the fold. There is also a narrow ochreous brown band extending from the costal three-fourths obliquely inward to beyond the end of the fold, edged with scattered silvery white scales along the outer side. There is an ill-defined yellowish white patch at the base of the dorsum, with a subovate patch located between the basal one-third and before the middle, consisting of tufts of erect shining grey scales, surrounded by six not well separated black spots, margined with white scales along the inner and anterior margins. The hindwings are greyish brown.

== Etymology ==
The species name refers to Pu'er City, the type locality.
