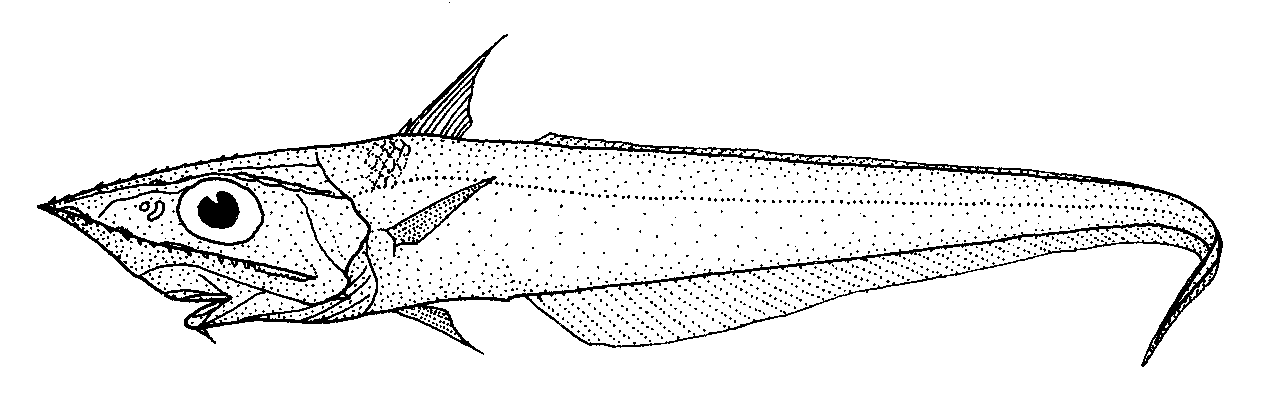
- Drawing by Dr Tony Ayling

Scientific classification
- Domain: Eukaryota
- Kingdom: Animalia
- Phylum: Chordata
- Class: Actinopterygii
- Order: Gadiformes
- Family: Macrouridae
- Genus: Coelorinchus
- Species: C. kermadecus

Binomial name
- Coelorinchus kermadecus Jordan & Gilbert, 1904

= Kermadec rattail =

Species of fish

The Kermadec rattail (Coelorinchus kermadecus) is a species of rattail found around New Zealand including the Kermadec Islands at depths of between 1,100 and 1,200 m. Its length is about 40 cm.
