= Spearsnouted grenadier =

Conservation status
- Least Concern (IUCN 3.1)

Scientific classification
- Domain: Eukaryota
- Kingdom: Animalia
- Phylum: Chordata
- Class: Actinopterygii
- Order: Gadiformes
- Family: Macrouridae
- Genus: Coelorinchus
- Species: C. labiatus

Binomial name
- Coelorinchus labiatus (Koehler, 1896)

Synonyms
- Caelorinchus labiatus Köhler, 1896; Caelorinchus vaillanti Roule, 1916; Coelorhynchus labiatus Köhler, 1896; Coelorhynchus talismani Collett, 1905; Coelorhynchus vaillanti Roule, 1916; Coelorinchus vaillanti Roule, 1916; Coryphaenoides talismani Roule, 1916; Coelorinchus vaillanti Collett, 1905; Macrourus labiatus Köhler, 1896; Macrurus labiatus Köhler, 1896; Oxygadus labiatus Köhler, 1896

Species of fish

The spearsnouted grenadier (Coelorinchus labiatus) is a species of fish in the family Macrouridae.

== Description ==
The spearsnouted grenadier is greyish in colour, with the mouth, gill cavities and first dorsal fin blackish. It is up to 50 cm (1.6 ft) in length. It has two dorsal spines and the photophore is short and not visible externally.

== Habitat ==
The spearsnouted grenadier lives in the eastern Atlantic Ocean; it is bathydemersal, living at depths of 460–2,220 m (1,510–7,280 ft).

== Behaviour ==
The spearsnouted grenadier feeds on crustaceans and small fish. It lives up to 10 years. Lepidapedon arlenae and Derogenes varicus are parasitic upon it.
