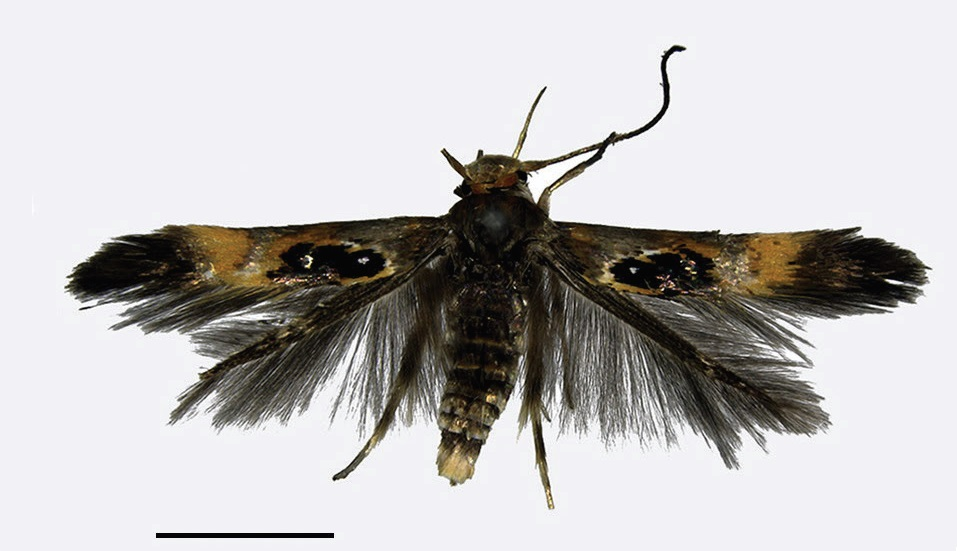

Scientific classification
- Domain: Eukaryota
- Kingdom: Animalia
- Phylum: Arthropoda
- Class: Insecta
- Order: Lepidoptera
- Family: Stathmopodidae
- Genus: Hieromantis
- Species: H. sheni

Binomial name
- Hieromantis sheni Li & Wang, 2002

= Hieromantis sheni =

Species of moth

Hieromantis sheni is a moth of the Stathmopodidae family. It is found in China (Chongqing, Hebei, Henan, Hubei, Jiangxi, Shaanxi, Shanxi, Tianjin, Yunnan, Zhejiang).

The wingspan is 7−10.5 mm.
