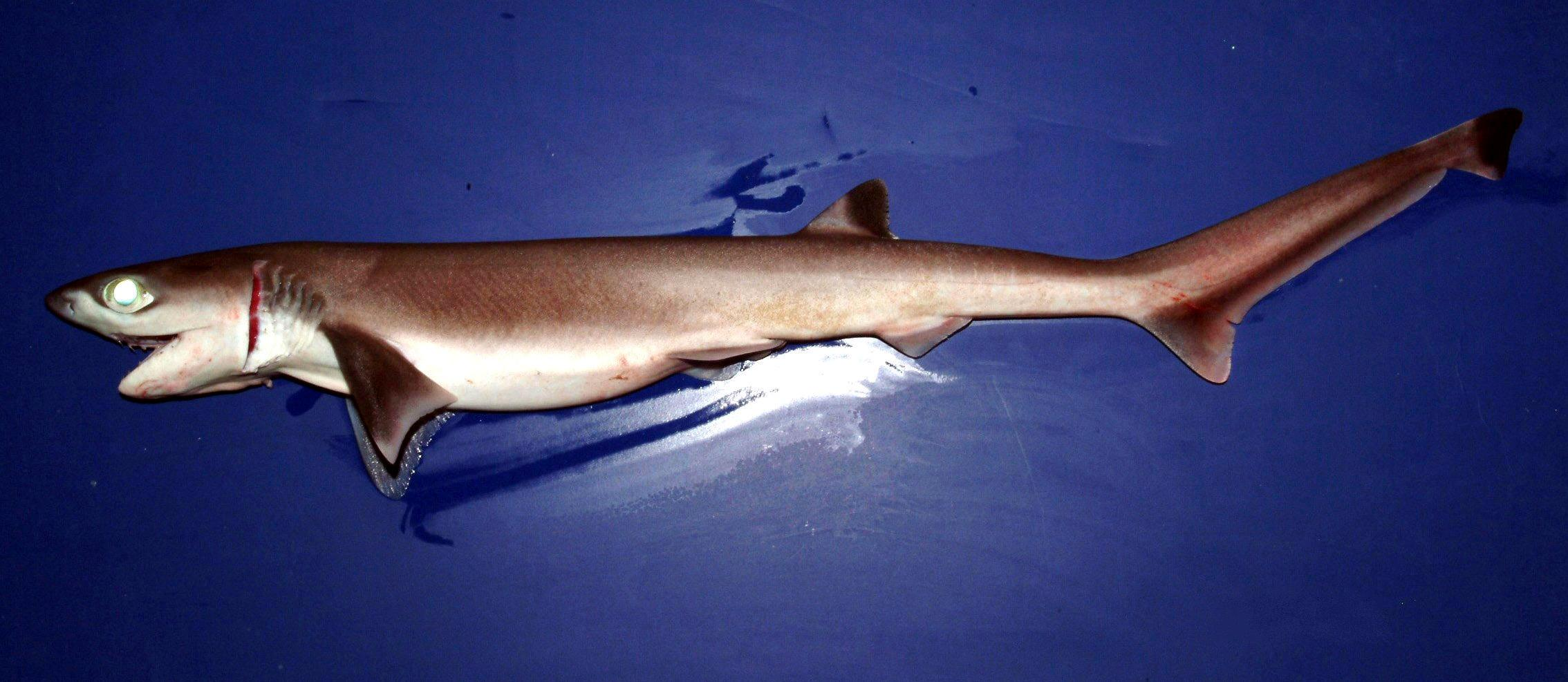
- Sharpnose sevengill shark (Heptranchias perlo)

Scientific classification
- Domain: Eukaryota
- Kingdom: Animalia
- Phylum: Chordata
- Class: Chondrichthyes
- Subclass: Elasmobranchii
- Division: Selachii
- Order: Hexanchiformes
- Family: Hexanchidae
- Genus: Heptranchias; Rafinesque, 1810

Type species
- Squalus perlo Bonnaterre, 1788

Synonyms
- Heptanchus Müller and Henle, 1841; Heptranchus Gray, 1851; Heptrancus Costa, 1857; Notidanion

= Heptranchias =

Heptranchias Temporal range: Cretaceous – Recent

Genus of sharks

Heptranchias is a genus of sharks in the family Hexanchidae.

== Species ==
- Heptranchias perlo (Bonnaterre, 1788) (sharpnose sevengill shark)
- †Heptranchias ezoensis Applegate & Uyeno, 1968
- †Heptranchias howelli Reed, 1946
- †Heptranchias karagalensis Kozlov in Zhelezko & Kozlov, 1999
- †Heptranchias tenuidens Leriche, 1938

== Fossil record ==
Fossils of Heptranchias are found in marine strata from the Cretaceous period. Fossils are known from various localities in Europe, North America, South America, New Zealand and Japan.

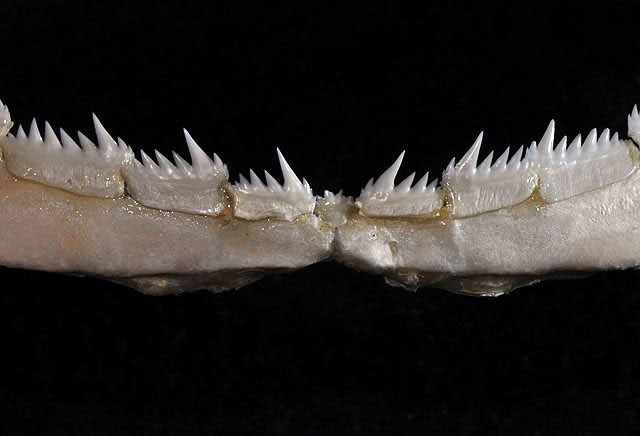
Heptranchias perlo lower teeth

== Bibliography ==
- Bonnaterre, J.P. 1788, Tableau encyclopédique et méthodique des trois règnes de la nature... Ichthyologie. Paris. Tableau encyclopédique et méthodique des trois règnes de la nature... Ichthyologie.: i-lvi + 1-215, Pls. A-B + 1-100.
- Compagno, L.J.V. 1. Hexanchiformes to Lamniformes // Sharks of the world. An annotated and illustrated catalogue of sharks species known to date. — FAO Fish Synop., 1984. — Vol. 4. — P. 14. — 249 p.
- Heptranchias. FishBase. Ed. Rainer Froese and Daniel Pauly. February 2009 version. N.p.: FishBase, 2009.
- Rafinesque, C.S. 1810, Caratteri di alcuni nuovi generi e nuove specie di animali e piante della sicilia, con varie osservazioni sopra i medisimi. (Part 1 involves fishes, pp. [i-iv] 3-69 [70 blank], Part 2 with slightly different title, pp. ia-iva + 71-105 [106 blank]). Caratteri di alcuni nuovi generi e nuove specie di animali e piante della sicilia, con varie osservazioni sopra i medisimi.. Pls. 1-20. [Dates to 1810 (see Holthius & Boeseman 1977 [ref. 6877], Wheeler 1988 [ref. 6878]). Also see Boewe 1982 [ref. 6030].]

== See also ==
- List of prehistoric cartilaginous fish genera
