= Coelorinchus sheni =

Scientific classification
- Kingdom: Animalia
- Phylum: Chordata
- Class: Actinopterygii
- Order: Gadiformes
- Suborder: Macrouroidei
- Family: Macrouridae
- Genus: Coelorinchus
- Species: C. sheni

Binomial name
- Coelorinchus sheni M. L. Chiou, K. T. Shao & Iwamoto, 2004

Species of fish

Coelorinchus sheni is a species of rattail. It is only known from depths of 450–650 m off the coast of Taiwan.

This is a fairly large rattail with the limited number of known specimens including one over 93 cm in length. It has a large eye, a long, blunt-ended snout and a large-opening mouth. There is a series of dark saddle-shaped marks along the body and a small light-producing organ.
