= Javelin argument =

Ancient logical argument

The javelin argument, credited to Lucretius, is an ancient logical argument that the universe, or cosmological space, must be infinite. The javelin argument was used to support the Epicurean thesis about the universe. It was also constructed to counter the Aristotelian view that the universe is finite.

== Overview ==
Lucretius introduced the concept of the javelin argument in his discourse of space and how it can be bound. He explained:

For whatever bounds it, that thing must itself be bounded likewise; and to this bounding thing there must be a bound again, and so on for ever and ever throughout all immensity. Suppose, however, for a moment, all existing space to be bounded, and that a man runs forward to the uttermost borders, and stands upon the last verge of things, and then hurls forward a winged javelin,— suppose you that the dart, when hurled by the vivid force, shall take its way to the point the darter aimed at, or that something will take its stand in the path of its flight, and arrest it? For one or other of these things must happen. There is a dilemma here that you never can escape from.

The javelin argument has two implications. If the hurled javelin flew onwards unhindered, it meant that the man running was not at the edge of the universe because there is something beyond the edge where the weapon flew. On the other hand, if it did not, the man was still not at the edge because there must be an obstruction beyond that stopped the javelin. However, the argument assumes incorrectly that a finite universe must necessarily have a "limit" or edge. The argument fails in the case that the universe might be shaped like the surface of a hypersphere or torus. (Consider a similar fallacious argument that the Earth's surface must be infinite in area: because otherwise one could go to the Earth's edge and throw a javelin, proving that the Earth's surface continued wherever the javelin hit the ground.)
