= Rough-head whiptail =

Scientific classification
- Kingdom: Animalia
- Phylum: Chordata
- Class: Actinopterygii
- Order: Gadiformes
- Suborder: Macrouroidei
- Family: Macrouridae
- Genus: Coelorinchus
- Species: C. aspercephalus

Binomial name
- Coelorinchus aspercephalus Waite, 1911

Species of fish

The rough-head whiptail (Coelorinchus aspercephalus), also known as the oblique banded rattail, is a species of rattail found around New Zealand including islands to New Zealand's south, at depths of between 30 and 300 m. Its length is between 15 and 35 cm.
