= Oblique (Vasarely) =

Collage by 20th-century Hungarian artist

Coordinates: 47.5159°N 19.0768°E

- Ferde (Hungarian)
- Artist: Victor Vasarely
- Year: 1966
- Type: collage
- Dimensions: 78 cm × 77 cm (31 in × 30 in)
- Location: Museum of Fine Arts; Budapest

Oblique (in Hungarian: Ferde) is a collage by Hungarian artist Victor Vasarely from 1966 to 1974.

== Description ==
Its dimensions are 78 x 77 centimeters. The picture is part of the collection of the Museum of Fine Arts in Budapest, Hungary.

== Analysis ==
The Op art work is a grid of diagonal squares arranged to form a bright green central cross, whose colours fade and darken to black in successive rows away from it, overlaid with a pattern of uniformly dark blue roundels. Clipping of the shapes suggests overlapping layers, whose inferred edges interrupt the symmetry of the shapes with an elusive pattern.
