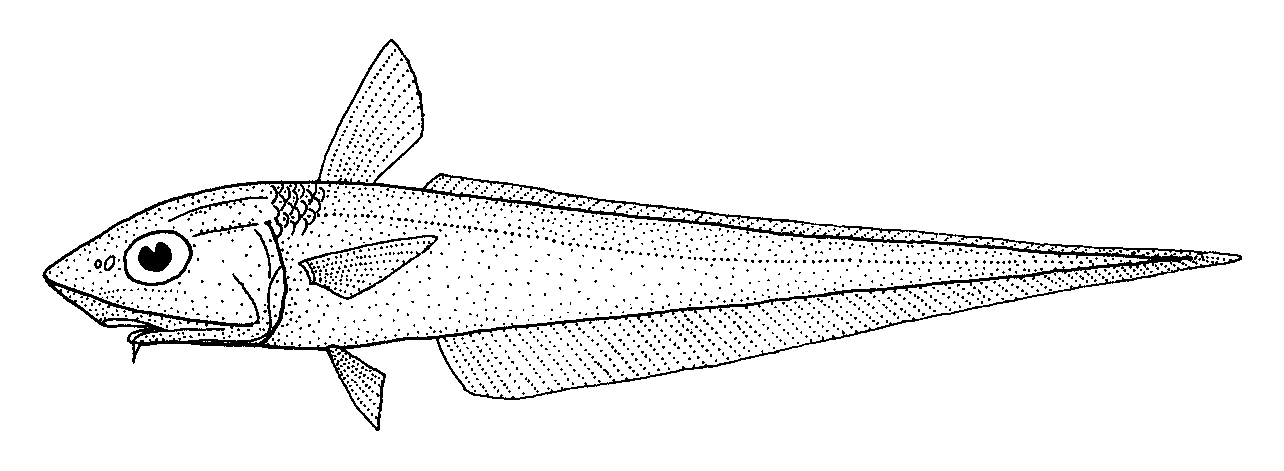
- Drawing by Dr Tony Ayling

Scientific classification
- Kingdom: Animalia
- Phylum: Chordata
- Class: Actinopterygii
- Order: Gadiformes
- Family: Macrouridae
- Genus: Coelorinchus
- Species: C. australis

Binomial name
- Coelorinchus australis (J. Richardson, 1839)

Synonyms
- Lepidoleprus australis Richardson, 1839; Macrurus australis (Richardson, 1839)

= Coelorinchus australis =

Species of fish

Coelorinchus australis, the javelin, javelinfish, or southern whiptail, is a species of fish found around Australia and New Zealand at depths of between 80 and 500 m. Its length is between 25 and 50 cm. It is a brownish color with 8 or 9 pale longitudinal stripes, and a small chin barbel. It feeds on octopus, fishes, and decapod crustaceans.
