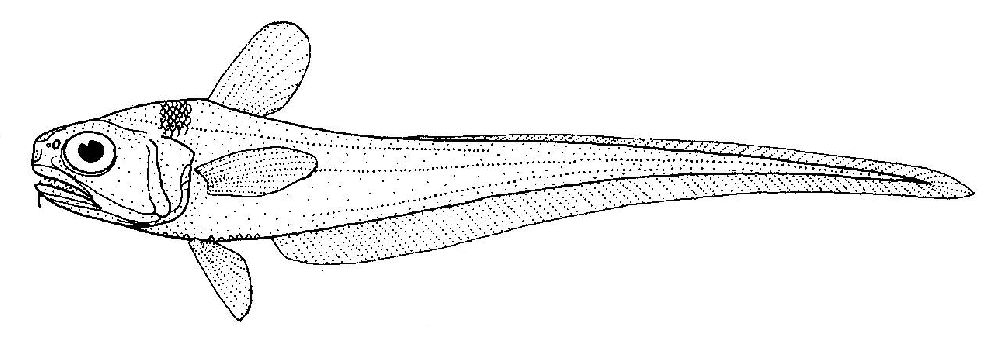
- Drawing by Dr Tony Ayling

Scientific classification
- Kingdom: Animalia
- Phylum: Chordata
- Class: Actinopterygii
- Order: Gadiformes
- Family: Macrouridae
- Genus: Lepidorhynchus; J. Richardson, 1846
- Species: L. denticulatus

Binomial name
- Lepidorhynchus denticulatus J. Richardson, 1846

= Thorntooth grenadier =

Species of fish

The thorntooth grenadier or javelin fish, Lepidorhynchus denticulatus, is a rattail, the only member of the genus Lepidorhynchus, found around southern Australia and New Zealand, at depths of between 200 and 1,000 m. Its length is between 20 and 55 cm.
