= Charles McCann =

Indian born New Zealand botanist, biologist and naturalist (1899–1980)

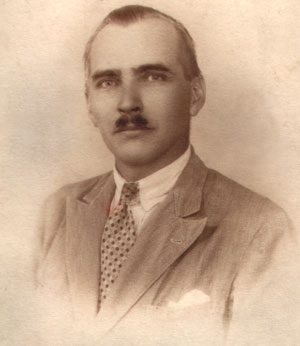
- Charles McCann in 1939
- Born: Castle Rock, Karnataka

Yule Mervyn Charles McCann (4 December 1899 – 29 November 1980) was a naturalist in India and New Zealand. He wrote a popular book on the trees of India and edited a major regional flora apart from publishing many of his other observations, mainly in the journal of the Bombay Natural History Society (BNHS) that he was associated with. He contributed to studies of New Zealand's whales, seals, skinks and geckos.

== Early life ==
Born at Castle Rock in India, his exposure to the wilderness during his childhood in the forests of the Goa area shaped his lifelong interest in natural history:

Some of the grandest tropical forest surrounded the area and the fauna abounded with wildlife, from elephants to flies, so much so that doors had to be closed at sundown for fear of dangerous intruders—even the King Cobra, though rare, occurred in the area. Such an environment seems to have influenced my future as a student of nature! My parents informed me that I was the bane of their existence for I froze on to everything that moved. All attempts at shaping my ends had no avail. From misdirected babyhood onwards the kink increased out of all proportion (according to some, I was just daft!)

He studied at St. Mary's High school at Mazagaon in Bombay (now Mumbai) and worked for a while under Father Ethelbert Blatter at St. Xavier's College as a laboratory assistant and curator. During 1916-1920 he worked under Blatter on botany. He briefly worked with the Bombay city police and then joined the Bombay Natural History Society (BNHS) as a collector for the Mammal Survey. He worked on the survey around 1921–22 in the Palni Hills and also in the Indus delta areas.

== Career ==
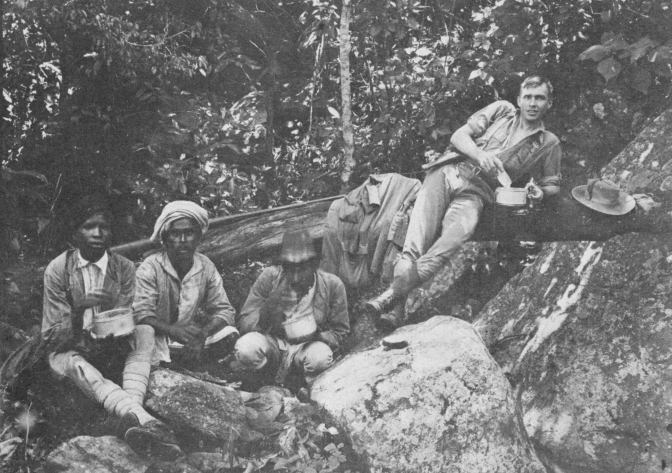
Collecting in the Palni Hills c.1921

McCann became the Assistant Curator and served as editor of the Journal of the BNHS. He was involved in the development of the Natural History galleries of the Prince of Wales Museum of Bombay. He was a prolific writer and published 200 articles and papers in the Journal of the BNHS, covering plants, birds, mammals and insects. He was also a fellow of the Linnean Society of London.

In 1946 he resigned his post at the BNHS and migrated to New Zealand. The executive committee of the Bombay Natural History Society noted:

The merit of his scientific work is evidenced in his many contributions to the journal of the Society. He is one of the outstanding botanists in India and his monograph on Grasses, which he wrote jointly with the late Fr. Blatter and which was published under the aegis of the Imperial Council of Agricultural Research, will remain for many years the standard work on the subject. Equally outstanding in merit are his various revisions of the genera and species of Indian plants which the Society was privileged to publish. McCann also contributed various authoritative papers on Indian Mammals, Reptiles and Amphibians. The study of nature was his absorbing passion and his main recreation… His resignation is a great loss to the Society.

In New Zealand he joined the Dominion Museum (now Museum of New Zealand Te Papa Tongarewa) at Wellington as a Vertebrate Zoologist. He became interested in the whale and seal collections as well as deep-sea fishes. He also made significant contributions to New Zealand herpetology.

The BNHS instituted the Charles McCann Vertebrate Fieldwork Fund in his memory to promote field research.

== Family ==
McCann married Eleanor Mary Allen (b. 1906) and they had three children Carlyle (“Carl”) Ethelbert McCann (1928–1995), Trevor Ian McCann (1930–2006) and Marie Dolores McCann (1934–2005). After the death of Eleanor in 1956 he married Muriel Florence Mottershead and they had a son Robbie McCann.

== Publications ==
A partial list of publications.

Journal of the Bombay Natural History Society

- (1930) Nidification of Storks. JBNHS. 34(2):579-581.
- (1931) Courtship of the Scarlet Minivet (Pericrocotus speciosus). JBNHS. 34(4):1061-1062.
- (1931) Notes on the Whistling School Boy or Malabar Whistling Thrush (Myiophoneus horsfieldi, Vigors). JBNHS. 35(1):202-204.
- (1932) Notes on the nesting habits of the Red-vented Bulbul (Molpastes cafer). JBNHS. 35(3):680-681.
- (1936) The Short-eared Owl Asio flammeus (Pontopp.) out at sea. JBNHS. 38(3):623-624.
- (1940) A note on the Alpine Swift (Micropus melba bakeri Hartert). JBNHS. 42(1):198-199.
- Hughes, A R & McCann, C (1939) On the road to Gersoppa and back. JBNHS. 41:446.
- (1932) Nestling of the Indian Pied Kingfisher (Ceryle rudis) attacked by larvae of parasitic fly. JBNHS. 35(4):897-898.
- (1933) The Brown Hawk-owl (Ninox scutulata Raffles) feeding on bats. JBNHS. 36(4):1002-1003.
- (1937) Curious behaviour of the Jungle Crow (Corvus macrorhynchus) and the White-backed Vulture (Gyps bengalensis). JBNHS. 39(4):864.
- (1937) The distribution of the White-eared Bulbul (Molpastes leucogenys leucotis (Gould)) in the swamps near the Vaitarna River. JBNHS. 39(4):864-865.
- (1937) The breeding of the Little Green Bittern (Butorides striatus javanicus) in Salsette Island. JBNHS. 39(4):869-870.
- (1939) The Flamingo (Phoenicopterus ruber antiquorum Temm.). JBNHS. 41(1):12-38.
- (1941) Vultures and palms. JBNHS. 42(2):439-440.
- (1941) Curious nesting site of the Red-wattled Lapwing (Lobivanellus indicus indicus Bodd.). JBNHS. 42(2):439-440.
- (1947) Flamingoes in Kutch-a comment. JBNHS. 47(1):164-166.
- (1954) Birds associating natural phenomena with food supply. JBNHS. 52(2-3):607-609.
- (1955) Has the Cuckoo a protrusible ovipositor? JBNHS. 52(4):931-932.
- (1942) A 'busman's' holiday in the Abu Hills. JBNHS. 43(2):206-217.
- (1941) Two naturalists visit Karwar, North Kanara. JBNHS. 42(3):602-610.
- (1943) The rains come to the Abu hills. JBNHS. 43(4):641-647.
- On the Breeding Habits of some Myriapoda. JBNHS. 26: 303–4.
- A note on the Habits of the Large-scaled Earth Snake (Silybura macrolepis) JBNHS 29: 1062–3.
- Occurrence of the worm-like Batrachian Ichthyophis monochrous at Khandala, Poona District. JBNHS 31: 1039.
- The Study of Plant Life—(3 parts) Vols. JBNHS 32: 692–703 (2 plates & 5 text-figures) and JBNHS 33: 35–46, 262–278.
- Notes on the Flowering of Strobilanthes callosus JBNHS 34: 264–65.
- Notes on some wild species of Aroids JBNHS 34: 518–21.
- On the Fertilization of the Flowers of the Sausage-Tree (Kigelia pinnata) by Bats JBNHS 35: 467–71.
- Notes on Indian Batrachians (10 plates, 2 text-figures) JBNHS 36: 152–80.
- Notes on the Flying Fox (Pteropus giganteus) JBNHS 37: 143–49.
- Notes on the Common Land Crab (Paratelphusa guerini) of Salsette. JBNHS 39: 531.
- The Flamingo (Phoenicopterus ruber antiquorum Temm.) (7 plates) JBNHS 41: 21–38.
- A Reptile and Amphibian Miscellany. 2 parts. (15 plates 3 text-figures) JBNHS 41: 742–64; JBNHS 42: 45–64.
- Two naturalists visit Karwar, N. Kanara (1 plate) JBNHS 42: 602–10.
- The Rains come to the Abu Hills. (with a plate) JBNHS 43: 641–47.

With Blatter, REV. E., S. J. Ph.D., F.I.S.

- Revision of the Flora of the Bombay Presidency—16 parts Vols. JBNHS 32–36.
- Two new Species of Grasses from Panchgani (Satara District) JBNHS 32: 357–58.
- Some new species of Plants from the Western Ghats. JBNHS 32: 733–36.
- A New Ceropegia from the Western Ghats. JBNHS 34: 936.
- Another new Ceropegia from the Western Ghats. JBNHS 35: 409.

Books

- (1959) 100 Beautiful trees of India
