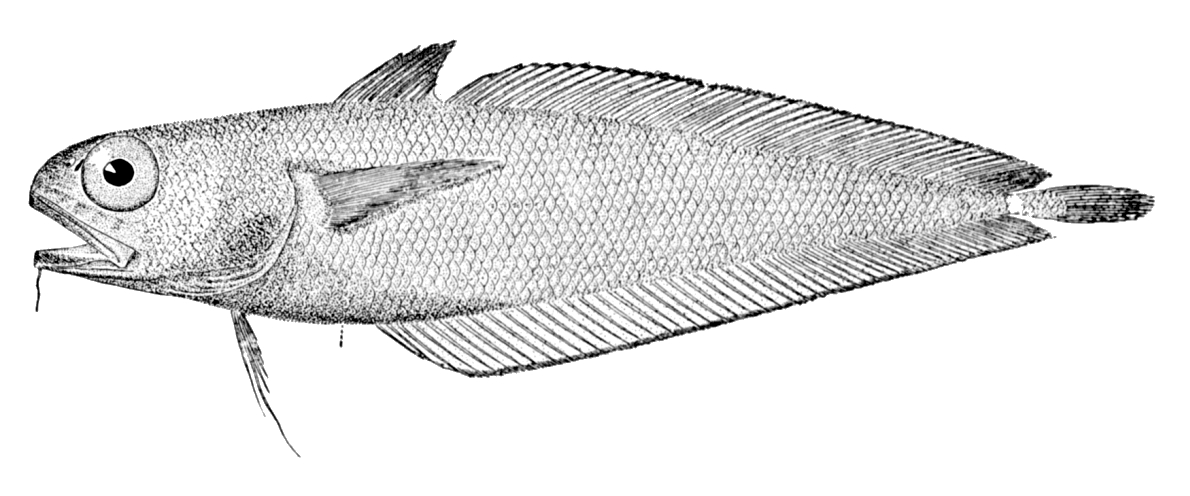
- Hakeling (P. fulvus)
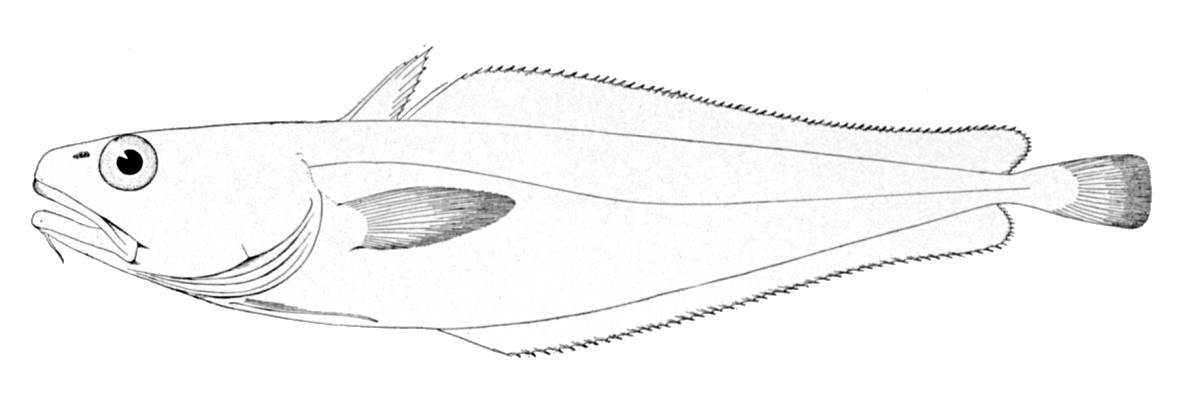
- P. kaupi

Scientific classification
- Kingdom: Animalia
- Phylum: Chordata
- Class: Actinopterygii
- Order: Gadiformes
- Family: Moridae
- Genus: Physiculus; Kaup, 1858

Type species
- Physiculus dalwigki Kaup, 1858

= Physiculus =

Physiculus Temporal range: Early Miocene to Present

Genus of fishes

Physiculus is a genus of morid cods.

== Species ==
The 42 currently recognized species in this genus are:

- Physiculus andriashevi Shcherbachev, 1993
- Physiculus argyropastus Alcock, 1894
- Physiculus beckeri Shcherbachev, 1993
- Physiculus bertelseni Shcherbachev, 1993
- Physiculus capensis Gilchrist, 1922
- Physiculus chigodarana Paulin, 1989
- Physiculus cirm Carvalho-Filho & Pires, 2019
- Physiculus coheni Paulin, 1989
- Physiculus cyanostrophus M. E. Anderson & Tweddle, 2002
- Physiculus cynodon Sazonov, 1986
- Physiculus dalwigki Kaup, 1858 (black codling)
- Physiculus fedorovi Shcherbachev, 1993
- Physiculus fulvus T. H. Bean, 1884 (hakeling)
- Physiculus grinnelli D. S. Jordan & E. K. Jordan, 1922
- Physiculus helenaensis Paulin, 1989 (skulpin)
- Physiculus hexacytus Parin, 1984
- Physiculus huloti Poll, 1953
- Physiculus japonicus Hilgendorf, 1879 (Japanese codling)
- Physiculus karrerae Paulin, 1989
- Physiculus kaupi Poey, 1865
- Physiculus longicavis Parin, 1984
- Physiculus longifilis M. C. W. Weber, 1913 (filament cod)
- Physiculus luminosus Paulin, 1983 (Luminescent cod)
- Physiculus marisrubri Brüss, 1986
- Physiculus maslowskii Trunov, 1991
- Physiculus microbarbata Paulin & Matallanas, 1990
- Physiculus natalensis Gilchrist, 1922
- Physiculus nematopus C. H. Gilbert, 1890 (charcoal mora)
- Physiculus nielseni Shcherbachev, 1993
- Physiculus nigrescens H. M. Smith & Radcliffe, 1912 (darktip cod)
- Physiculus nigripinnis Okamura, 1982
- Physiculus normani Brüss, 1986
- Physiculus parini Paulin, 1991
- Physiculus peregrinus (Günther, 1872)
- Physiculus rastrelliger C. H. Gilbert, 1890 (hundred fathom mora)
- Physiculus rhodopinnis Okamura, 1982
- Physiculus roseus Alcock, 1891 (rosy cod)
- Physiculus sazonovi Paulin, 1991
- Physiculus sterops Paulin, 1989
- Physiculus sudanensis Paulin, 1989
- Physiculus talarae Hildebrand & F. O. Barton, 1949 (Peruvian mora)
- Physiculus therosideros Paulin, 1987 (scalyfin cod)
- Physiculus yoshidae Okamura, 1982
