= Physiculus hexacytus =

Scientific classification
- Domain: Eukaryota
- Kingdom: Animalia
- Phylum: Chordata
- Class: Actinopterygii
- Order: Gadiformes
- Family: Moridae
- Genus: Physiculus
- Species: P. hexacytus

Binomial name
- Physiculus hexacytus Parin, 1984

Species of fish

Physiculus hexacytus is a species of bathydemersal fish found in the eastern-central Pacific Ocean.

== Description ==
This species reaches a length of 18.9 cm (7.4 in).
