= Physiculus longicavis =

Scientific classification
- Domain: Eukaryota
- Kingdom: Animalia
- Phylum: Chordata
- Class: Actinopterygii
- Order: Gadiformes
- Family: Moridae
- Genus: Physiculus
- Species: P. longicavis

Binomial name
- Physiculus longicavis Parin, 1984

Species of fish

Physiculus longicavis is a species of bathydemersal fish found in the south-eastern Pacific Ocean.

== Description ==
This species reaches a length of 20.8 cm (8.2 in).
