= Acnodon senai =

Conservation status
- Data Deficient (IUCN 3.1)

Scientific classification
- Kingdom: Animalia
- Phylum: Chordata
- Class: Actinopterygii
- Order: Characiformes
- Family: Serrasalmidae
- Genus: Acnodon
- Species: A. senai

Binomial name
- Acnodon senai Jégu & dos Santos, 1990

Species of fish

Acnodon senai, Sena's pacu, is a species of freshwater ray-finned fish belonging to the family Serrasalmidae, which includes the pacus and piranhas. This fish is found in Brazil.

== Taxonomy ==
Acnodon senai was first formally described in 1990 by the ichthyologists Michel Jégu, who is French, and Geraldo M. dos Santos, who is Brazilian, with its type locality given as 0°35'45"S, 52°38'20"W from a beach downstream of Rio Jari, Amapa, Carapatinho Island. This species is classified in the genus Acnodon which belongs to the subfamily Myleinae in the family Serrasalmidae which is classified in the suborder Characoidei of the order Characiformes.

== Etymology ==
Acnodon senai is classified in the genus Acnodon, a name which prefixies a-, meaning without, onto knodon, which means "the projecting teeth on a hunting spear", an allusion to the mistaken perception that the type species of the genus, A. oligacanthus, does not have a spine in front of its dorsal fin, it actually does but it is very small. The specific name honors the memory of fisheries worker Anazildo Mateus de Sena, Instituto Nacional de Pesquisas da Amazônia in Manaus, who collected the type specimen during one of his last trips to the field in June 1987.

== Description ==
Acnodon senai told apart from A. oligacanthus by the possession of two closely set rows of premaxillary teeth, and by the lack of a black humeral spot. The meristic and anatomical characters shown by this species are more similar to those of A. normani although it has a slightly different body shape.

== Distribution ==
Acnodon senai is endemic to Brazil where it is only known to occur in the Jari River basin, and all the records are from the part of the basin which will be affected by the Santo Antônio do Jari hydroelectric plant (UHE).
