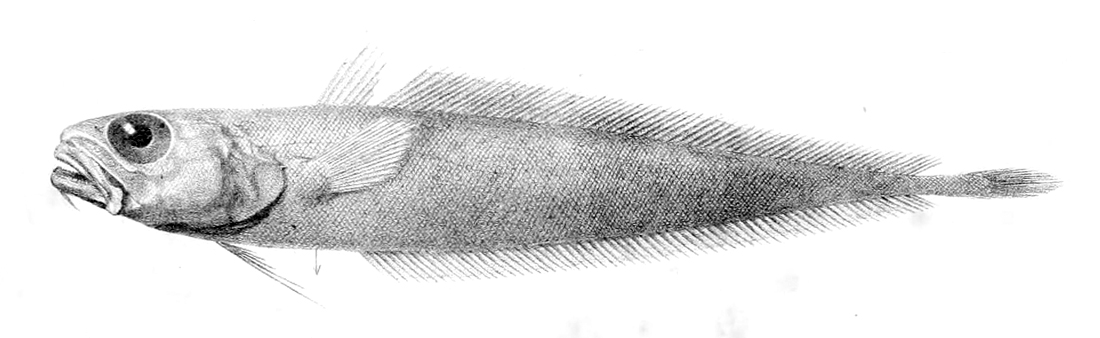

Conservation status
- Least Concern (IUCN 3.1)

Scientific classification
- Kingdom: Animalia
- Phylum: Chordata
- Class: Actinopterygii
- Order: Gadiformes
- Family: Moridae
- Genus: Physiculus
- Species: P. dalwigki

Binomial name
- Physiculus dalwigki Kaup, 1858

= Physiculus dalwigki =

Species of fish

Physiculus dalwigki, the black codling, is a species of bathydemersal fish found in the Atlantic Ocean.

== Size ==
This species reaches a length of 30.0 cm (11.8 in).

== Etymology ==
The fish is named in honor of German statesman Reinhard von Dalwigk (1802–1888).
