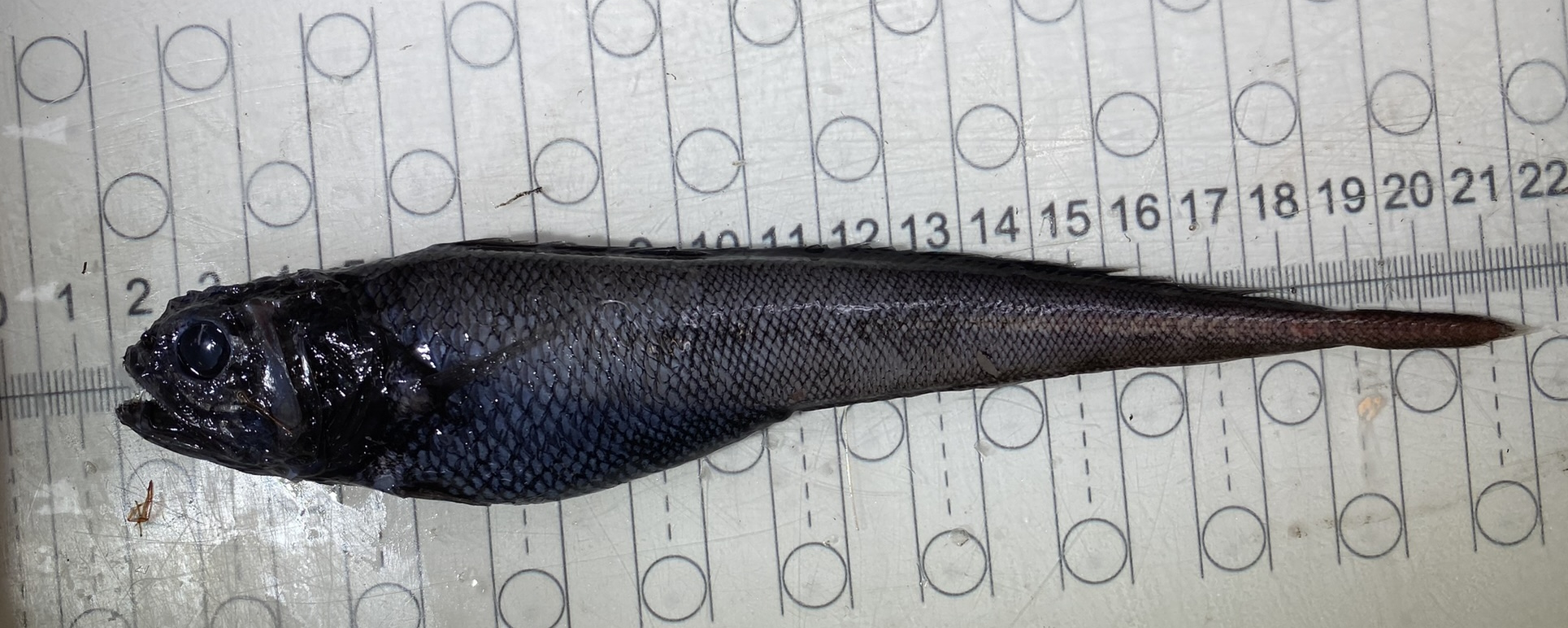
- Arrowtail

Scientific classification
- Kingdom: Animalia
- Phylum: Chordata
- Class: Actinopterygii
- Order: Gadiformes
- Family: Melanonidae
- Genus: Melanonus
- Species: M. zugmayeri

Binomial name
- Melanonus zugmayeri Norman, 1930

Synonyms
- Melanonus macrostoma Maul, 1952; Melanonus unipennis Beebe, 1932

= Melanonus zugmayeri =

Species of fish

Melanonus zugmayeri, the arrowtail, is a species of mesopelagic gadiform belonging to the pelagic cod family Melanonidae.

== Name ==
Melanonus zugmayeri takes its generic name from the Greek roots melan, meaning black, and onos, meaning hake.

== Etymology ==
The specific name is in honour of Austrian ichthyologist Erich Zugmayer. The common name refers to the distinct caudal fin, separated from the dorsal and anal fins.

== Description ==
Melanonus zugmayeri is a relatively large mesopelagic fish, with the largest known specimen reaching a total length of 294mm. It has an elongate body, covered in black cycloid scales, which is compressed laterally, reaching its deepest point at the dorsal fin origin before tapering gradually towards the tail. Its head is more weakly compressed and has a large mouth, with three rows of needle-like teeth in the upper jaw and two in the lower. The teeth in the lower jaw are of uneven size; this trait is used to distinguish the species from its congener M. gracilis, however there is some confusion over whether this distinction is valid. There are also conflicting reports regarding whether the species has two dorsal fins, with separate membranes, or one dorsal fin with an enlarged anterior section. Unlike many members of the gadiformes, M. zugmayeri lacks a chin barbel.

=== Lateral line system ===
M. zugmayeri possesses a highly developed lateral line system, as is common among deep sea fish. There are wide canals on the head, perforated with large pores that allow the neuromasts within to sense water movement. In addition to these canals there are conspicuous and numerous superficial neuromasts, a trait it shares in common with the melamphaid fish Poromitra capito, consisting of raised papillae in which continuous lines of hair cells are embedded.

== Ecology ==
The trophic ecology of Melanonus zugmayeri is little known and poorly studied, presumably as this fish is rarely encountered and is of no commercial interest. It is known to predate on crustaceans, with natant decapods reported from stomach contents alongside euphausiid krill and the amphipod Phronima. It has been reported from the stomach contents of the himantolophid anglerfish Himantolophus paucifilosus. It is a host for anisakid nematode parasites.
