= Physiculus roseus =

Conservation status
- Least Concern (IUCN 3.1)

Scientific classification
- Kingdom: Animalia
- Phylum: Chordata
- Class: Actinopterygii
- Order: Gadiformes
- Family: Moridae
- Genus: Physiculus
- Species: P. roseus

Binomial name
- Physiculus roseus Alcock, 1891

Species of fish

Physiculus roseus, the rosy cod, is a species of bathydemersal fish found in the Indo-Pacific from the Bay of Bengal in the eastern Indian Ocean to the western shore of Australia, Indonesia, Papua New Guinea, and from the south China Sea to New Caledonia.

== Size ==
This species reaches a length of 23 cm (9.1 in).
