= Physiculus bertelseni =

Scientific classification
- Kingdom: Animalia
- Phylum: Chordata
- Class: Actinopterygii
- Order: Gadiformes
- Family: Moridae
- Genus: Physiculus
- Species: P. bertelseni

Binomial name
- Physiculus bertelseni Shcherbachev, 1993

Species of fish

Physiculus bertelseni is a species of bathydemersal fish found in the western Indian Ocean.

== Etymology ==
The fish is named in honor of Danish ichthyologist Erik Bertelsen (1912–1993).
