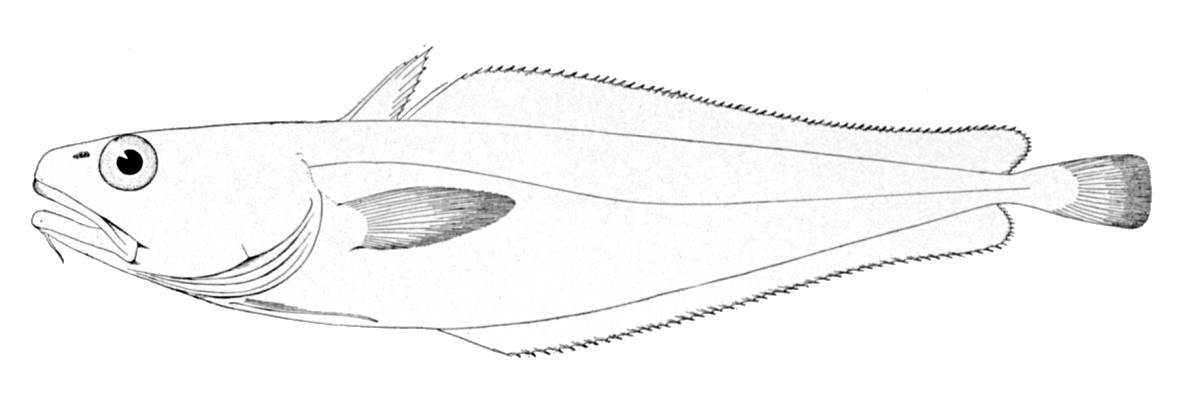

Scientific classification
- Kingdom: Animalia
- Phylum: Chordata
- Class: Actinopterygii
- Order: Gadiformes
- Family: Moridae
- Genus: Physiculus
- Species: P. kaupi

Binomial name
- Physiculus kaupi Poey, 1865

= Physiculus kaupi =

Species of fish

Physiculus kaupi is a species of bathydemersal fish found in the western Atlantic Ocean.

== Size ==
This species reaches a length of 22.4 cm (8.8 in).

== Etymology ==
The fish is named in honor of naturalist Johann Jacob Kaup (1803–1873), who proposed the genus name Physiculus in 1858.
