= Physiculus maslowskii =

Conservation status
- Data Deficient (IUCN 3.1)

Scientific classification
- Kingdom: Animalia
- Phylum: Chordata
- Class: Actinopterygii
- Order: Gadiformes
- Family: Moridae
- Genus: Physiculus
- Species: P. maslowskii

Binomial name
- Physiculus maslowskii Trunov, 1991

Species of fish

Physiculus maslowskii is a species of bathydemersal fish found in the eastern Atlantic Ocean.

== Size ==
This species reaches a length of 16.9 cm (6.7 in).

== Etymology ==
The fish is named in memory of Alexandr Davidovich Maslovskiy (1897–1969), how was Trunov's first teacher, and an associate professor in the Department of Hydrobiology, Khar'kov State University.
