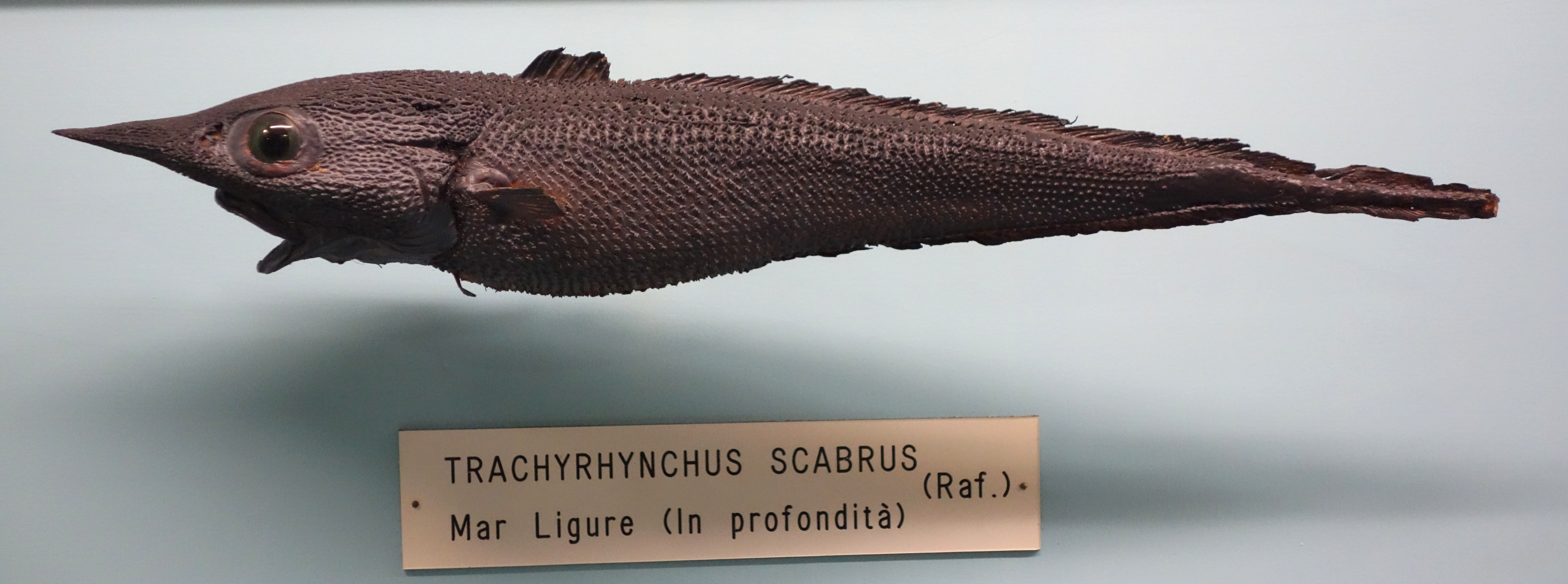
- Trachyrincus scabrus

Scientific classification
- Kingdom: Animalia
- Phylum: Chordata
- Class: Actinopterygii
- Order: Gadiformes
- Family: Trachyrincidae
- Genus: Trachyrincus; Giorna, 1809

Type species
- Lepidoleprus trachyrincus as a synonym of Trachyrincus scabrus Risso, 1810

Species
- See text

Synonyms
- Lepidoleprus Risso, 1810; Lepidosoma Swainson, 1839; Oxycephas Rafinesque, 1810

= Trachyrincus =

Genus of fishes

Trachyrincus is a genus of rattail fish in the family Trachyrincidae.

== Species ==
There are currently six recognized species in this genus:

- Trachyrincus aphyodes P. J. McMillan, 1995
- Trachyrincus helolepis C. H. Gilbert, 1892 (Armourhead grenadier)
- Trachyrincus longirostris (Günther, 1878) (Slender unicorn rattail)
- Trachyrincus murrayi Günther, 1887 (Roughnose grenadier)
- Trachyrincus scabrus (Rafinesque, 1810) (Roughsnout grenadier)
- Trachyrincus villegai Pequeño, 1971 (Grey grenadier)
