= Physiculus chigodarana =

Scientific classification
- Kingdom: Animalia
- Phylum: Chordata
- Class: Actinopterygii
- Order: Gadiformes
- Family: Moridae
- Genus: Physiculus
- Species: P. chigodarana

Binomial name
- Physiculus chigodarana Paulin, 1989

Species of fish

Physiculus chigodarana is a species of bathydemersal fish found in the north-western Pacific Ocean.

== Size ==
This species reaches a length of 18.0 cm (7.1 in).
