= Physiculus nigrescens =

Scientific classification
- Kingdom: Animalia
- Phylum: Chordata
- Class: Actinopterygii
- Order: Gadiformes
- Family: Moridae
- Genus: Physiculus
- Species: P. nigrescens

Binomial name
- Physiculus nigrescens H. M. Smith & Radcliffe, 1912

Species of fish

Physiculus nigrescens, the darktip cod, is a species of bathydemersal fish in the cod family Moridae. It is a marine fish that can be found in deep waters of the western Pacific Ocean and has been found in depths ranging from 84 to 3384 meters in regions such as northern Australia (from Queensland to Western Australia), the Arafura Sea, and the Philippines. Its native range includes Western Pacific regions such as Indonesia, the Arafura Sea, and Australia. It is a benthic species that can be found on the continental shelf and slope.

== Size ==
This species reaches a length of 16.6 cm (6.5 in).
