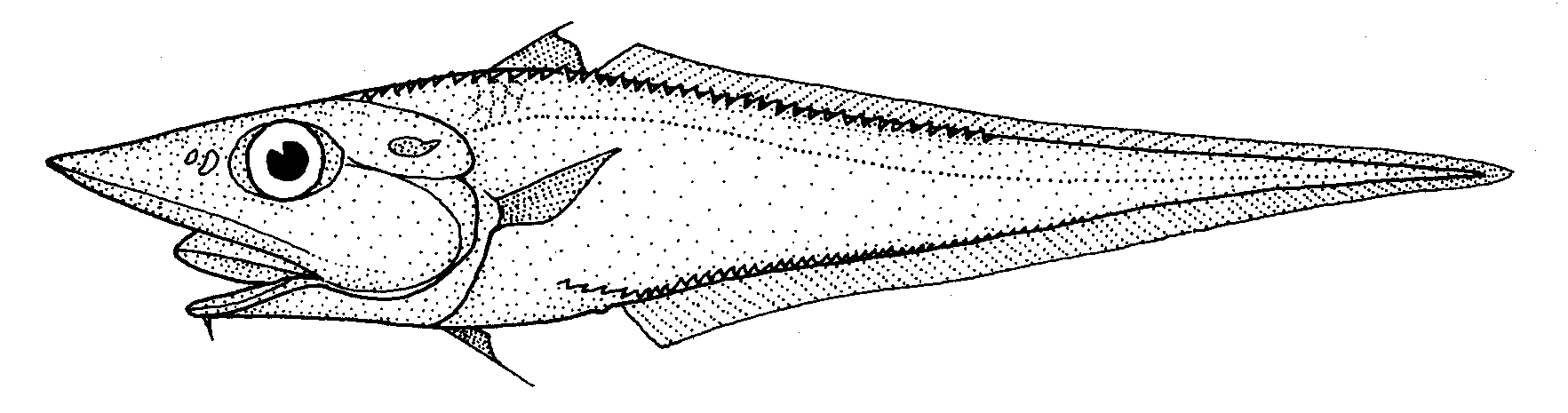
- Drawing by Dr Tony Ayling

Scientific classification
- Domain: Eukaryota
- Kingdom: Animalia
- Phylum: Chordata
- Class: Actinopterygii
- Order: Gadiformes
- Family: Macrouridae
- Genus: Trachyrincus
- Species: T. longirostris

Binomial name
- Trachyrincus longirostris (Günther, 1878)

Synonyms
- Macrurus longirostris Günther, 1878

= Slender unicorn rattail =

Species of fish

The slender unicorn rattail (Trachyrincus longirostris) is a rattail of the genus Trachyrincus, found in south-east Australia and New Zealand, at depths of between 850 and 1,300 m. Its length is between 30 and 60 cm.
