= Physiculus nematopus =

Conservation status
- Least Concern (IUCN 3.1)

Scientific classification
- Kingdom: Animalia
- Phylum: Chordata
- Class: Actinopterygii
- Order: Gadiformes
- Family: Moridae
- Genus: Physiculus
- Species: P. nematopus

Binomial name
- Physiculus nematopus C. H. Gilbert, 1890

Species of fish

Physiculus nematopus, the charcoal mora, is a species of bathydemersal fish found in the eastern-central Pacific Ocean.

== Size ==
This species reaches a length of 26.0 cm (10.2 in).
