= Physiculus cirm =

Scientific classification
- Kingdom: Animalia
- Phylum: Chordata
- Class: Actinopterygii
- Order: Gadiformes
- Family: Moridae
- Genus: Physiculus
- Species: P. cirm

Binomial name
- Physiculus cirm Carvalho-Filho & Pires, 2019

Species of fish

Physiculus cirm is a species of bathydemersal fish found in the Atlantic Ocean.

== Etymology ==
The fish is named for CIRM, Comissão Interministerial para os Recursos do Mar.
