= Physiculus sudanensis =

Scientific classification
- Kingdom: Animalia
- Phylum: Chordata
- Class: Actinopterygii
- Order: Gadiformes
- Family: Moridae
- Genus: Physiculus
- Species: P. sudanensis

Binomial name
- Physiculus sudanensis Paulin, 1989

Species of fish

Physiculus sudanensis is a species of bathydemersal fish found in the western Indian Ocean.
