= RV Vityaz (1939) =

Research vessel and museum ship

Coordinates: 54.706165°N 20.499878°E

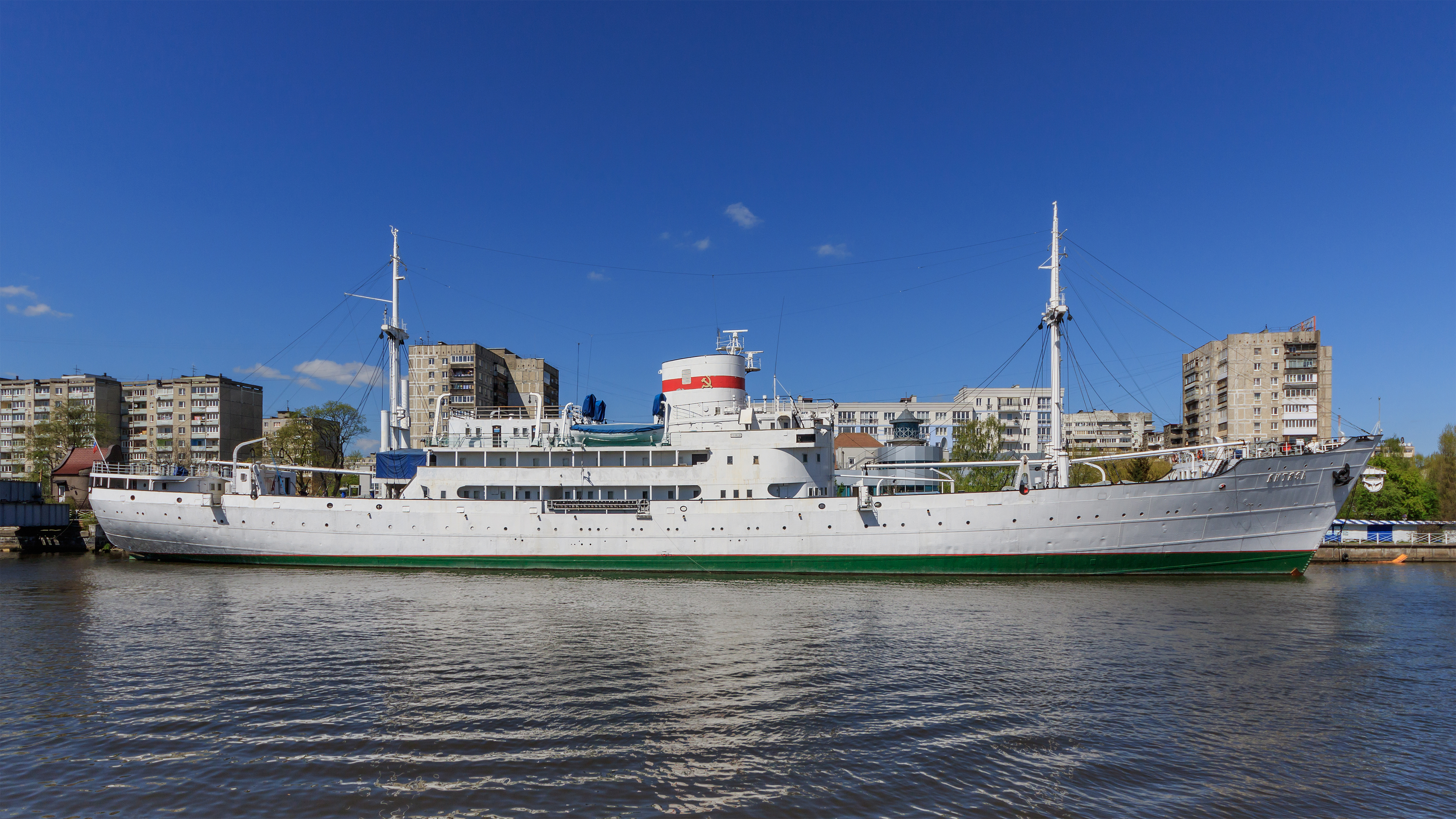
- Vityaz

History
- Name: Mars (1939–45); Empire Forth (1945–46); Equator (1946– ); Admiral Makarov ( –1949); Vityaz (since 1949)
- Owner: Neptun Line (1939–40); Kriegsmarine (1940); Neptun Line (1940–42); Kriegsmarine (1942–45); Ministry of War Transport (1945–46); Ministry of Transport (1946); Soviet Government (1946–82); Museum of World Oceans (since 1982)
- Operator: Neptun Line (1939–40); Kriegsmarine (1940); Neptun Line (1940–42); Kriegsmarine (1942–45); Prince Line (1945–46); Shirshov Institute of Oceanology, USSR Academy of Sciences (1946–82); Museum of World Oceans (since 1982)
- Port of registry: (Nazi Germany) Bremen, Germany (1939–40); Kriegsmarine (1940); (Nazi Germany) Bremen (1940–42); (Nazi Germany) Kriegsmarine (1942–45); London, United Kingdom (1945–46); Vladivostok, Soviet Union (1946-91); Russia (since 1991)
- Builder: Deutsche Schiff- und Maschinenbau AG
- Launched: August 1939
- Out of service: 1979
- Identification: United Kingdom Official Number 180962 (1945–46); Code Letters GLTZ (1945–46); Code Letters UPJA (since 1946); IMO number: 5382609
- Status: Museum ship

General characteristics
- Class & type: Cargo liner (1939–42, 1945–48); Hospital ship (1942–45); Research vessel (1948–79); Museum ship (since 1994)
- Tonnage: 2,471 GRT, 1,821 NRT (as built)
- Displacement: 5,701 tonnes (as converted)
- Length: 101.50 m (333 ft 0 in) (as built); 109.44 metres (359 ft 1 in) (as converted)
- Beam: 14.50 m (47 ft 7 in) (as built); 14.56 metres (47 ft 9 in) (as converted)
- Draught: 5.84 m (19 ft 2 in) (as built); 5.86 metres (19 ft 3 in) (as converted)
- Depth: 4.72 m (15 ft 6 in) (as built)
- Installed power: 2 diesel engines
- Propulsion: Twin screw propellers
- Speed: 14 knots (26 km/h)
- Endurance: 18,500 nautical miles (34,300 km) (Vityaz)
- Capacity: 12 passengers (Mars)
- Crew: 38 (Mars); 66, plus 70 research personnel (Vityaz)

Vityaz (Russian: Витязь) is a research vessel that was built in 1939 by Deutsche Schiff- und Maschinenbau AG, Bremen, Germany as Mars for Neptun Line, Bremen. She served with the Kriegsmarine during World War II and was seized by the United Kingdom in 1945. She was renamed Empire Forth for the Ministry of War Transport (MoWT).

She was allocated to the Soviet Union in 1946 under the terms of the Potsdam Agreement and renamed Equator (Russian: Экватор) and later renamed Admiral Makarov (Russian: Адмирал Мака́ров). She was renamed Vityaz in 1949 and was used as a research vessel. Retired in 1979, she was preserved as a museum ship in 1982.

== Description ==
When recorded in 1945, the ship was 101.50 m (333 ft 0 in) long, with a beam of 14.50 metres (47 ft 7 in). She had a depth of 4.72 metres (15 ft 6 in) and a draught of 5.84 metres (19 ft 2 in). She was assessed at 2,471 GRT, 1,821 NRT.

The ship was propelled by two two-stroke Single Cycle, Single Action diesel engines, which have seven cylinders of 24 7/16 inches (62 cm) diameter by 45 1/4 inches (115 cm) stroke driving twin screw propellers. The engines were built by Friedrich Krupp Germaniawerft, Kiel. They are rated at 3,000 hp. They could propel her at 14 knots (26 km/h).

== History ==
The ship was built as yard number 614 in 1939 by Deutsche Schiff- und Maschinenbau AG, Bremen, Germany as Mars for Neptun Line, Bremen. She was launched in August 1939. Her port of registry was Bremen.

Mars was operated by the Neptun Line. She had a crew of 38 and accommodation for twelve passengers. She was requisitioned in 1940 by the Kriegsmarine, but was returned to Neptun Line later that year. She was requisitioned again in 1942. and converted to a hospital ship for military use. On 13 December 1943, Mars was severely damaged in an air raid on Bremen by the United States Eighth Air Force. She assisted in the evacuation of German citizens from Königsberg and Pillau. Between January and April 1945, she carried 20,000 people. Mars was probably the last major ship to leave Pillau for Copenhagen.

In May 1945, Mars was seized at Copenhagen, Denmark. She was passed to the Ministry of War Transport and renamed Empire Forth. The Code Letters GLTZ and United Kingdom Official Number 169468 were allocated. Her port of registry was changed to London. She was operated under the management of Prince Line Ltd.

In 1946, Empire Forth was allocated to the Soviet Union under the terms of the Potsdam Agreement. She was renamed Equator (Russian: Экватор), and taken to Leningrad. The Code Letters UPJA were allocated. She was later renamed Admiral Makarov (Russian: Адмирал Мака́ров). She was converted to a research vessel in 1947-48 for the Shirshov Institute of Oceanology, USSR Academy of Sciences. The work was carried out at Leningrad, Odessa, Riga and Vladivostok in the Soviet Union and also at Wismar, Allied-occupied Germany. During the conversion, the ship was lengthened and equipped with modern laboratories and accommodation. Her measurements were now 109.44 metres (359 ft 1 in) long, with a beam of 14.56 metres (47 ft 9 in) and a draught of 5.86 metres (19 ft 3 in). Her displacement was 5,710 tonnes. In 1949, she was renamed Vityaz (Russian: Витязь).

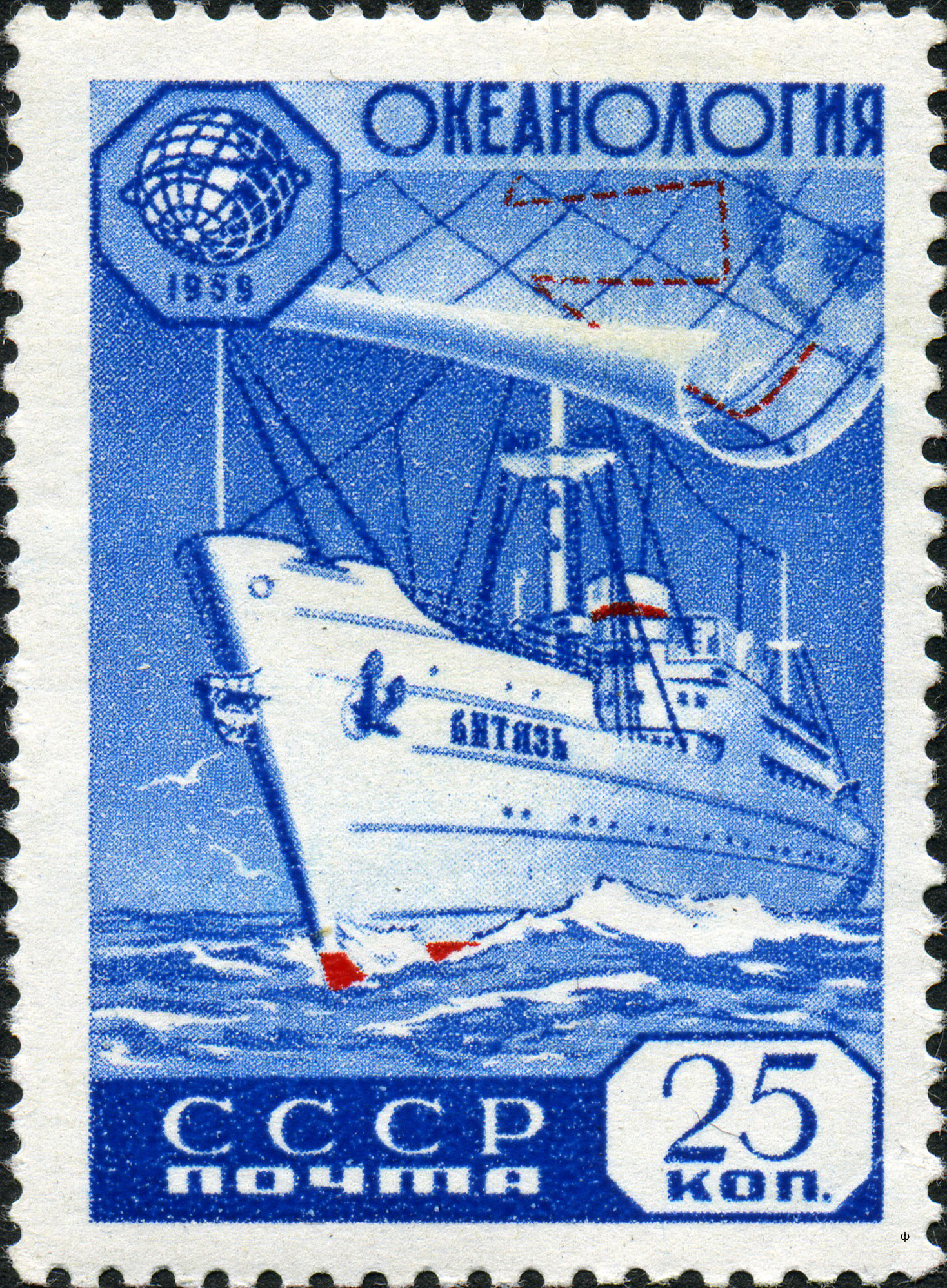
1959 stamp depicting Vityaz.

Vityaz had Vladivostok as her port of registry. She made 65 voyages covering 800,000 nautical miles (1,500,000 km). In August 1957, She measured the depth of the Mariana Trench at 11,022 metres (36,161 ft). On 29 May 1958, Vityaz was 2,000 nautical miles (3,700 km) west of the Marshall Islands when she detected radioactivity in rainfall at levels that were harmful to human health (see Operation Hardtack I). On 7 November 1960, Vityaz was reported to have been buzzed in the Arabian Sea by a Grumman S-2F Tracker from USS Essex. The United States Navy denied that the aircraft was buzzing the ship, but merely establishing her identity. With their introduction in the 1960s, Vityaz was allocated the IMO Number 5382609.

Scientists on board Vityaz discovered 1,176 new species of marine plants and animals. During her time as a research ship, Vityaz visited 49 countries and acted as a goodwill ambassador for the Soviet Union. Notable people who visited her include Jacques Cousteau and Thor Heyerdal. Vityaz made her final voyage around Europe and was retired on 22 April 1979. She was then laid up in the Pregol River. In 1982, she was preserved as a museum ship at Leningrad. In 1988, she was moved to the Yantar Shipyard, Kaliningrad, where she was repaired and rebuilt for use as a museum ship. In 1994, she was moved to the Museum of World Oceans, Kaliningrad, which was established in 1990. Vityaz is claimed to be the largest research vessel to have been preserved.

== Species discovered on Vityaz ==
One of the many species discovered by the ship.

- Dolichopteryx vityazi Parin, Belyanina & Evseenko, 2009 on the 26th Cruise.
