= Physiculus coheni =

Scientific classification
- Kingdom: Animalia
- Phylum: Chordata
- Class: Actinopterygii
- Order: Gadiformes
- Family: Moridae
- Genus: Physiculus
- Species: P. coheni

Binomial name
- Physiculus coheni Paulin, 1989

Species of fish

Physiculus coheni is a species of bathydemersal fish found in the eastern-central Pacific Ocean.

== Etymology ==
The fish is named in honor of Daniel M. Cohen (1930–2017), of the Natural History Museum of Los Angeles County, for his contributions to the knowledge of morid fishes.
