= Physiculus rhodopinnis =

Scientific classification
- Domain: Eukaryota
- Kingdom: Animalia
- Phylum: Chordata
- Class: Actinopterygii
- Order: Gadiformes
- Family: Moridae
- Genus: Physiculus
- Species: P. rhodopinnis

Binomial name
- Physiculus rhodopinnis Okamura, 1982

Species of fish

Physiculus rhodopinnis is a species of bathydemersal fish found in the Indo-Pacific from Madagascar to the Marianas, including the Kyushu-Palau Ridge and the northern Hawaiian Ridge.

== Description ==
This species reaches a length of 21.0 cm (8.3 in).
