= Physiculus marisrubri =

Scientific classification
- Domain: Eukaryota
- Kingdom: Animalia
- Phylum: Chordata
- Class: Actinopterygii
- Order: Gadiformes
- Family: Moridae
- Genus: Physiculus
- Species: P. marisrubri

Binomial name
- Physiculus marisrubri Brüss, 1986

Species of fish

Physiculus marisrubri is a species of bathydemersal fish found in the western Indian Ocean and the central Red Sea.

== Size ==
This species reaches a length of 10.7 cm (4.2 in).
