= Physiculus cynodon =

Scientific classification
- Domain: Eukaryota
- Kingdom: Animalia
- Phylum: Chordata
- Class: Actinopterygii
- Order: Gadiformes
- Family: Moridae
- Genus: Physiculus
- Species: P. cynodon

Binomial name
- Physiculus cynodon Sazonov, 1986

Species of fish

Physiculus cynodon is a species of bathydemersal fish found in the northern Pacific Ocean.
