= Blennius normani =

Conservation status
- Least Concern (IUCN 3.1)

Scientific classification
- Kingdom: Animalia
- Phylum: Chordata
- Class: Actinopterygii
- Order: Blenniiformes
- Family: Blenniidae
- Genus: Blennius
- Species: B. normani

Binomial name
- Blennius normani Poll, 1949

Species of fish

Blennius normani is a species of combtooth blenny found in the eastern Atlantic ocean. It reaches a maximum length of 11 centimetres (4.3 in) SL. The specific name honours the British ichthyologist John Roxborough Norman (1898-1944) of the British Museum (Natural History).
