= Physiculus sazonovi =

Scientific classification
- Kingdom: Animalia
- Phylum: Chordata
- Class: Actinopterygii
- Order: Gadiformes
- Family: Moridae
- Genus: Physiculus
- Species: P. sazonovi

Binomial name
- Physiculus sazonovi Paulin, 1991

Species of fish

Physiculus sazonovi is a species of bathydemersal fish found in the eastern-central Pacific Ocean.

== Size ==
This species reaches a length of 10.9 cm (4.3 in).

== Etymology ==
The fish is named in honor of Yuri I. Sazonov (1950–2002), the curator of ichthyology, at the Zoological Museum, at the Moscow State University, who established that this species is distinct from other Physiculus.
