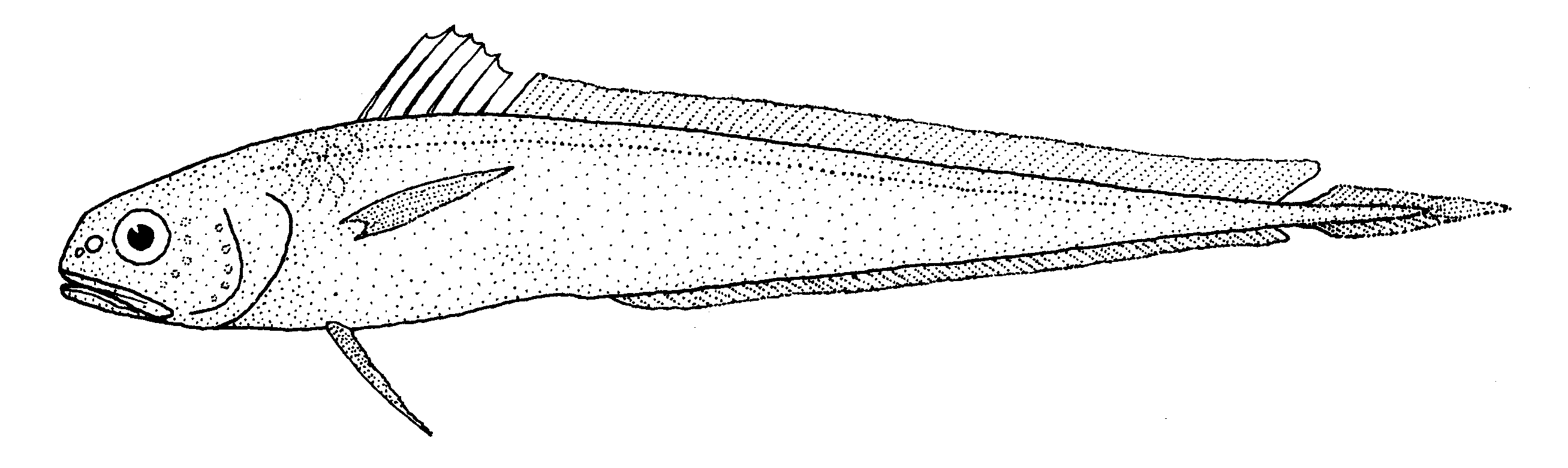
- Drawing by Dr Tony Ayling

Scientific classification
- Kingdom: Animalia
- Phylum: Chordata
- Class: Actinopterygii
- Division: Teleostei
- Order: Gadiformes
- Family: Melanonidae
- Genus: Melanonus
- Species: M. gracilis

Binomial name
- Melanonus gracilis Günther, 1878

Synonyms
- Melanonosoma acutecaudatum Gilchrist, 1902

= Pelagic cod =

Pelagic cod Temporal range: Thanetian to Present

Species of fish

The pelagic cod (Melanonus gracilis) is a small deepwater fish found in the Southern Ocean. It is one of only two species currently classified in the family Melanonidae, the other being the arrowtail, Melanonus zugmayeri.

== Name ==
Melanonus gracilis takes its name from the Greek roots melan meaning black, onos meaning hake, and gracilis meaning thin or slender. This is referring to its dark scales, compressed head and body, and how its body terminates into a long tapering tail without a caudal fin.

== Description ==
M. gracilis is a bathypelagic cod found in the Southern Ocean, discovered during the Challenger Expedition in 1878 off Antarctica at Station 156. The head and body are compressed and covered in pale to dark brown scales, with a spine lined with fleshy ridges and ending with a tapering tail lacking a caudal fin. The ratio of caudal vertebrae to abdominal vetebrae (44–13) allows it to provide appropriate propulsion through the mixture of red and white muscle fibers. It also lacks the barbel normally found in the Gadiformes family. M. gracilis is noted to be having small uniform teeth and an upper jaw that does not extend beyond the rear edge of its eye, with this being the major defining factor between itself and its sister species M. zugmayeri. Samples of M. gracilis have been found to grow to 15–19 cm in length.

== Habitat ==
M. gracilis has been recorded to be found in subantarctic, temperate, and occasionally tropical waters with recent samples being found as far south as Prydz Bay and as far north as the Subtropical Convergence. Most samples have been found between depths of 600–3600 m (330-1975 fathoms) with the original sample setting the maximum depth.

== Ecology ==
Little is known of the trophic ecology of M. gracilis due to the harsh environments it lives in, having no real commercial value, a relatively small sample since its initial discovery. M. gracilis have been found as stomach contents of grey-headed albatrosses. Through food web reconstruction the best estimate of M. gracilis diet is that it, like other pelagic fish, consume lower-trophic plankton and other invertebrates before either migrating or being forced into shallower waters and being themselves consumed by predators.
