= Physiculus nigripinnis =

Scientific classification
- Domain: Eukaryota
- Kingdom: Animalia
- Phylum: Chordata
- Class: Actinopterygii
- Order: Gadiformes
- Family: Moridae
- Genus: Physiculus
- Species: P. nigripinnis

Binomial name
- Physiculus nigripinnis Okamura, 1982

Species of fish

Physiculus nigripinnis is a species of bathydemersal fish found in the north-western Pacific on the Kyushu-Palau Ridge.

== Description ==
This species reaches a length of 29.0 cm (11.4 in).
