= Physiculus cyanostrophus =

Conservation status
- Least Concern (IUCN 3.1)

Scientific classification
- Kingdom: Animalia
- Phylum: Chordata
- Class: Actinopterygii
- Order: Gadiformes
- Family: Moridae
- Genus: Physiculus
- Species: P. cyanostrophus

Binomial name
- Physiculus cyanostrophus M. E. Anderson & Tweddle, 2002

Species of fish

Physiculus cyanostrophus is a bathydemersal fish found off Angola in the south-eastern Atlantic Ocean.

== Size ==
This species reaches a length of 38.4 cm (15.1 in).
