= Physiculus capensis =

Scientific classification
- Domain: Eukaryota
- Kingdom: Animalia
- Phylum: Chordata
- Class: Actinopterygii
- Order: Gadiformes
- Family: Moridae
- Genus: Physiculus
- Species: P. capensis

Binomial name
- Physiculus capensis Gilchrist, 1922

Species of fish

Physiculus capensis is a species of bathydemersal fish found from the south-eastern Atlantic Ocean to the western Indian Ocean.

== Description ==
This species reaches a length of 18.0 cm (7.1 in).
