= Physiculus yoshidae =

Scientific classification
- Kingdom: Animalia
- Phylum: Chordata
- Class: Actinopterygii
- Order: Gadiformes
- Family: Moridae
- Genus: Physiculus
- Species: P. yoshidae

Binomial name
- Physiculus yoshidae Okamura, 1982

Species of fish

Physiculus yoshidae is a species of bathydemersal fish found in the north-western Pacific Ocean near the Kyushu-Palau Ridge.

== Description ==
This species reaches a length of 20.0 cm (7.9 in).

== Etymology ==
The fish is named in honor of Miss Kiyoko Yoshida, who helped Okamura prepare the book in which this species was described.
