= Physiculus natalensis =

Scientific classification
- Domain: Eukaryota
- Kingdom: Animalia
- Phylum: Chordata
- Class: Actinopterygii
- Order: Gadiformes
- Family: Moridae
- Genus: Physiculus
- Species: P. natalensis

Binomial name
- Physiculus natalensis Gilchrist, 1922

Species of fish

Physiculus natalensis is a species of bathydemersal fish found in the western Indian Ocean.

== Description ==
This species reaches a length of 24.0 cm (9.4 in).
