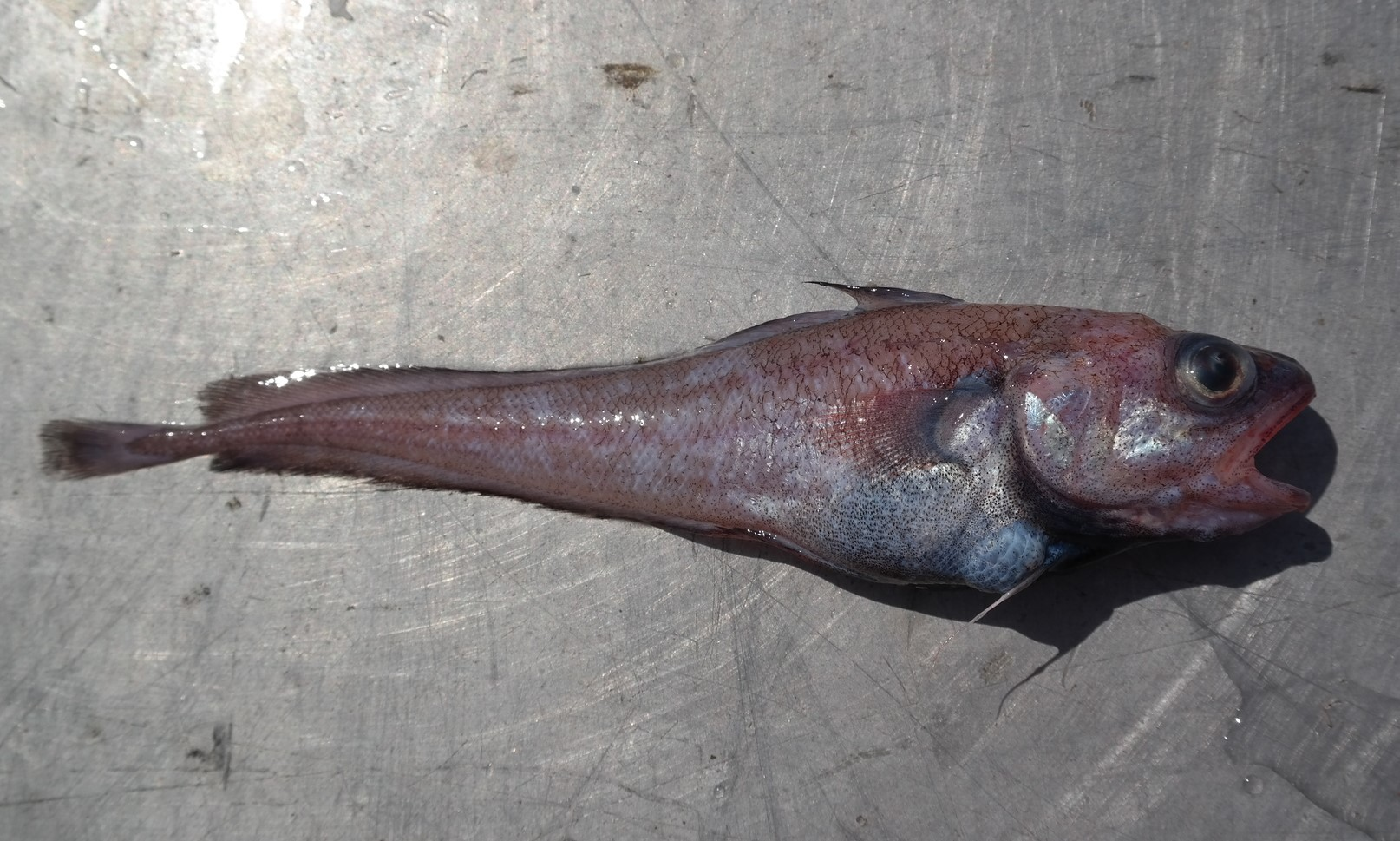

Scientific classification
- Domain: Eukaryota
- Kingdom: Animalia
- Phylum: Chordata
- Class: Actinopterygii
- Order: Gadiformes
- Family: Moridae
- Genus: Physiculus
- Species: P. rastrelliger

Binomial name
- Physiculus rastrelliger C. H. Gilbert, 1890

= Physiculus rastrelliger =

Hundred fathom mora

Species of fish

Physiculus rastrelliger, known as the hundred fathom mora, is a species of bathydemersal fish found in the eastern Pacific Ocean.

== Description ==
This species reaches a length of 25.0 cm (9.8 in).
