= Physiculus therosideros =

Scientific classification
- Kingdom: Animalia
- Phylum: Chordata
- Class: Actinopterygii
- Order: Gadiformes
- Family: Moridae
- Genus: Physiculus
- Species: P. therosideros

Binomial name
- Physiculus therosideros Paulin, 1987

Species of fish

Physiculus therosideros, the scalyfin cod, is a species of bathydemersal fish found in the eastern-central Pacific Ocean.

== Description ==
This species reaches a length of 16.8 cm (6.6 in).

== Etymology ==
Being that theros means summer and sideros means iron, the fish is named for the vessel Iron Summer, which conducted a deepwater survey for Queensland Fisheries Research (1982-1983) and collected the type specimens of this fish.
