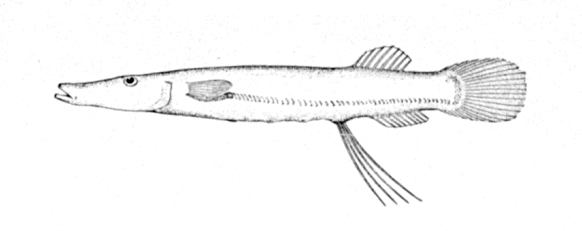
- Dolichopteryx longipes

Scientific classification
- Kingdom: Animalia
- Phylum: Chordata
- Class: Actinopterygii
- Order: Argentiniformes
- Family: Opisthoproctidae
- Genus: Dolichopteryx; A. B. Brauer, 1901

= Dolichopteryx =

Genus of fishes

Dolichopteryx is a genus of barreleyes.

== Species ==
There are currently 9 recognized species in this genus:

- Dolichopteryx anascopa A. B. Brauer, 1901
- Dolichopteryx andriashevi Parin, Belyanina & Evseenko, 2009
- Dolichopteryx longipes (Vaillant, 1888) (brownsnout spookfish)
- Dolichopteryx minuscula Fukui & Kitagawa, 2006
- Dolichopteryx parini Kobyliansky & Fedorov, 2001 (winged spookfish)
- Dolichopteryx pseudolongipes Fukui, Kitagawa & Parin, 2008 (spookfish)
- Dolichopteryx rostrata Fukui & Kitagawa, 2006
- Dolichopteryx trunovi Parin, 2005
- Dolichopteryx vityazi Parin, Belyanina & Evseenko, 2009
