= Pseudoraniceps =

Scientific classification
- Domain: Eukaryota
- Kingdom: Animalia
- Phylum: Chordata
- Class: Actinopterygii
- Order: Gadiformes
- Genus: †Pseudoraniceps; Fedotov, 1974

Extinct genus of fishes

Pseudoraniceps is an extinct genus of prehistoric ray-finned fish.

== See also ==
- Prehistoric fish
- List of prehistoric bony fish
