= Physiculus peregrinus =

Scientific classification
- Domain: Eukaryota
- Kingdom: Animalia
- Phylum: Chordata
- Class: Actinopterygii
- Order: Gadiformes
- Family: Moridae
- Genus: Physiculus
- Species: P. peregrinus

Binomial name
- Physiculus peregrinus (Günther, 1872)

Synonyms
- Pseudophycis peregrinus Günther, 1872

Species of fish

Physiculus peregrinus is a species of bathydemersal fish found in the western Pacific Ocean.

== Size ==
This species reaches a length of 21.7 cm (8.5 in).
