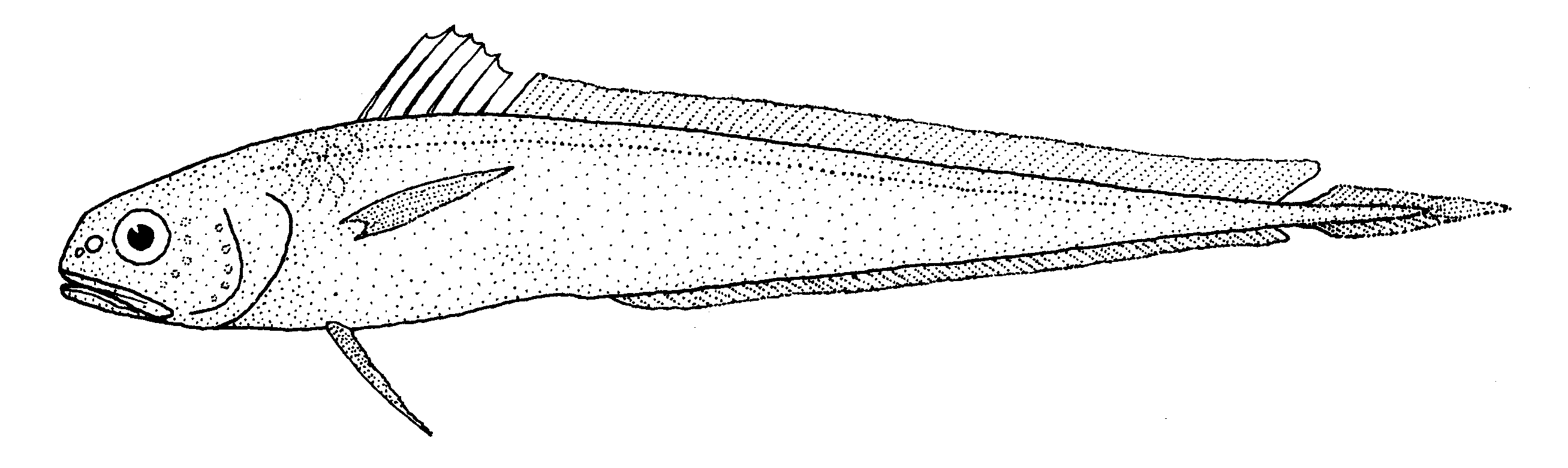
- Pelagic cod (M. gracilis)

Scientific classification
- Kingdom: Animalia
- Phylum: Chordata
- Class: Actinopterygii
- Order: Gadiformes
- Suborder: Macrouroidei
- Family: Melanonidae; Goode & Bean, 1896
- Genus: Melanonus; Günther, 1878

Type species
- Melanomus gracilis Günther, 1878

Synonyms
- Melanonosoma Gilchrist, 1902

= Melanonus =

Genus of fishes

Melanonus is a genus of gadiform fishes containing just two species of cod-like marine fishes. This is the only genus in the family Melanonidae.

Both species are small fish, no more than 15 cm (5.9 in) in length, and are black in colour. They live in the midwaters of the Atlantic, Pacific and Indian Oceans, well away from coasts.

== Species ==
The currently recognized species in this genus are:

- Melanonus gracilis Günther, 1878 (pelagic cod)
- Melanonus zugmayeri Norman, 1930 (arrowtail)
