= Physiculus normani =

Scientific classification
- Kingdom: Animalia
- Phylum: Chordata
- Class: Actinopterygii
- Order: Gadiformes
- Family: Moridae
- Genus: Physiculus
- Species: P. normani

Binomial name
- Physiculus normani Brüss, 1986

Species of fish

Physiculus normani is a species of bathydemersal fish found in the western Indian Ocean.

== Etymology ==
The fish is named in honor of ichthyologist J. R. (John Roxborough) Norman (1898–1944), of the British Museum (Natural History), who first described this cod.
