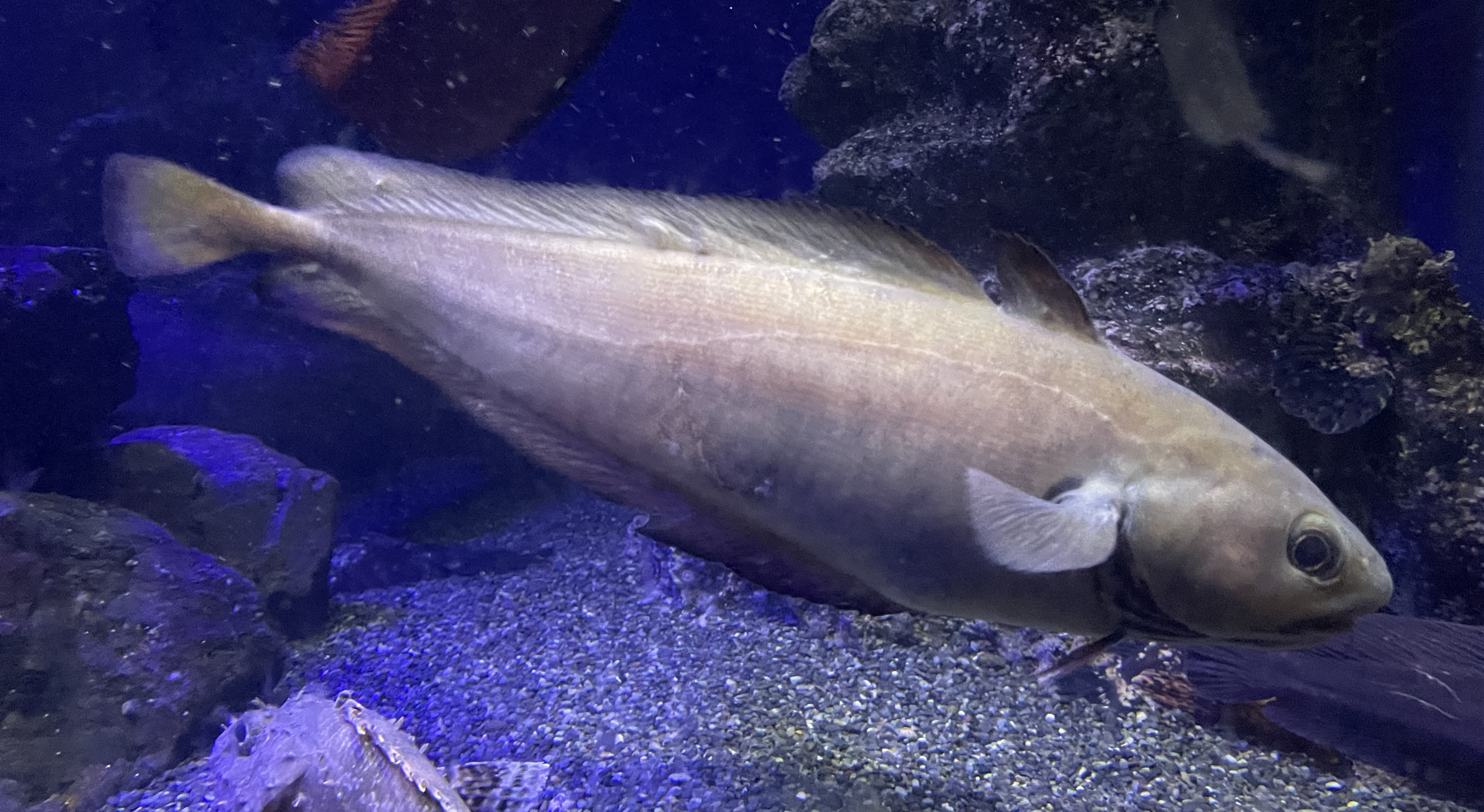

Scientific classification
- Domain: Eukaryota
- Kingdom: Animalia
- Phylum: Chordata
- Class: Actinopterygii
- Order: Gadiformes
- Family: Moridae
- Genus: Physiculus
- Species: P. japonicus

Binomial name
- Physiculus japonicus Hilgendorf, 1879

= Physiculus japonicus =

Japanese codling

Species of fish

Physiculus japonicus, known as the Japanese codling, is a bathydemersal fish found throughout waters surrounding Japan and the East China Sea.
