= Physiculus andriashevi =

Japanese codling

Scientific classification
- Kingdom: Animalia
- Phylum: Chordata
- Class: Actinopterygii
- Order: Gadiformes
- Family: Moridae
- Genus: Physiculus
- Species: P. andriashevi

Binomial name
- Physiculus andriashevi Shcherbachev, 1993

Species of fish

Physiculus andriashevi is a species of bathydemersal fish found in the western Indian Ocean.

== Etymology ==
The fish is named in honor of Russian ichthyologist Anatoly Petrovich Andriashev (1910–2009).
