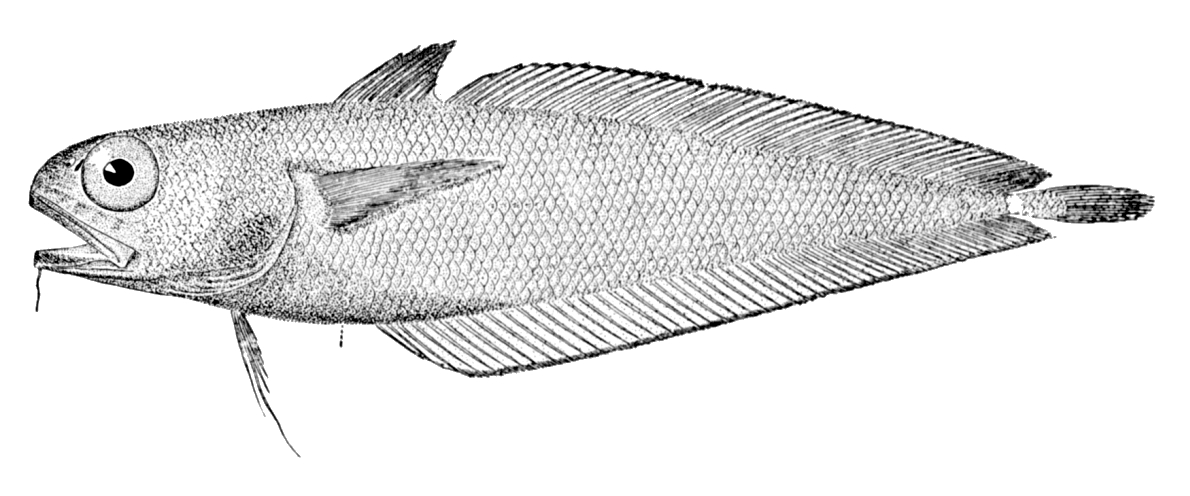

Scientific classification
- Domain: Eukaryota
- Kingdom: Animalia
- Phylum: Chordata
- Class: Actinopterygii
- Order: Gadiformes
- Family: Moridae
- Genus: Physiculus
- Species: P. fulvus

Binomial name
- Physiculus fulvus T. H. Bean, 1884

= Physiculus fulvus =

Hakeling

Species of fish

Physiculus fulvus, the hakeling, is a species of bathydemersal fish found in the western Atlantic Ocean.

== Size ==
This species reaches a length of 10.6 cm (4.2 in).
