= Physiculus fedorovi =

Scientific classification
- Kingdom: Animalia
- Phylum: Chordata
- Class: Actinopterygii
- Order: Gadiformes
- Family: Moridae
- Genus: Physiculus
- Species: P. fedorovi

Binomial name
- Physiculus fedorovi Shcherbachev, 1993

Species of fish

Physiculus fedorovi is a species of bathydemersal fish found in the western Indian Ocean.

== Etymology ==
The fish is named in honor of Vladimir Vladimirovich Fedorov (b. 1939), of the Zoological Institute of St. Petersburg, for his contributions to the study of the deep-sea fishes, particularly those of the Pacific Ocean.
