= Physiculus parini =

Conservation status
- Data Deficient (IUCN 3.1)

Scientific classification
- Kingdom: Animalia
- Phylum: Chordata
- Class: Actinopterygii
- Order: Gadiformes
- Family: Moridae
- Genus: Physiculus
- Species: P. parini

Binomial name
- Physiculus parini Paulin, 1991

Species of fish

Physiculus parini is a species of bathydemersal fish found in the south-eastern Pacific Ocean.

== Description ==
This species reaches a length of 11 cm (4.3 in).

== Etymology ==
The fish is named in honor of ichthyologist Nikolai Vasilyevich Parin (1932–2012), of the Russian Academy of Sciences, because of his contributions to the study of marine fishes of southeastern Pacific Ocean.
