= Dolichopteryx andriashevi =

Scientific classification
- Kingdom: Animalia
- Phylum: Chordata
- Class: Actinopterygii
- Order: Argentiniformes
- Family: Opisthoproctidae
- Genus: Dolichopteryx
- Species: D. andriashevi

Binomial name
- Dolichopteryx andriashevi Parin, Belyanina & Evseenko, 2009

Species of fish

Dolichopteryx andriashevi is a species of fish endemic to in the Philippine Sea.

== Description ==
This species reaches a length of 6.3 cm (2.5 in).

== Etymology ==
The fish is named in memory of the Russian ichthyologist Anatolii Petrovich Andriashev (1910–2009), who made a huge contribution to the study of fishes of the world's oceans.
