= Physiculus microbarbata =

Conservation status
- Data Deficient (IUCN 3.1)

Scientific classification
- Kingdom: Animalia
- Phylum: Chordata
- Class: Actinopterygii
- Order: Gadiformes
- Family: Moridae
- Genus: Physiculus
- Species: P. microbarbata

Binomial name
- Physiculus microbarbata Paulin & Matallanas, 1990

Species of fish

Physiculus microbarbata is a species of bathydemersal fish found in the eastern-central Atlantic Ocean.
