= Dolichopteryx trunovi =

Scientific classification
- Kingdom: Animalia
- Phylum: Chordata
- Class: Actinopterygii
- Order: Argentiniformes
- Family: Opisthoproctidae
- Genus: Dolichopteryx
- Species: D. trunovi

Binomial name
- Dolichopteryx trunovi Parin, 2005

Species of fish

Dolichopteryx trunovi, the tailspot barracudina, is a species of fish found in the oceans of the Southern hemisphere.

== Description ==
This species reaches a length of 14.3 cm (5.6 in).

== Etymology ==
The fish is named in honor of ichthyologist Ivan Andreevich Trunov (1936-2005), of the Atlantic Research Institute of Fisheries and Oceanography.
