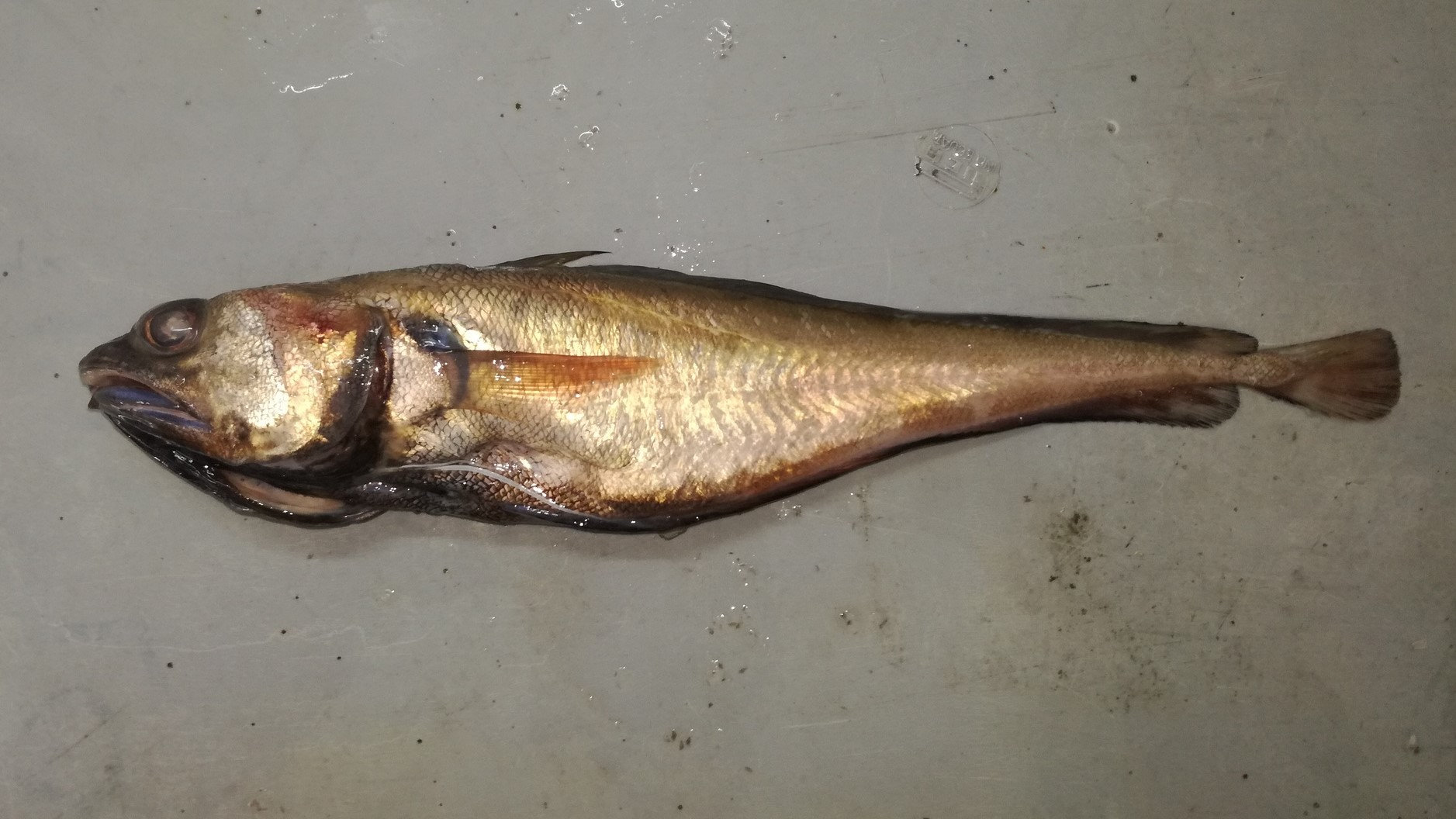

Conservation status
- Least Concern (IUCN 3.1)

Scientific classification
- Kingdom: Animalia
- Phylum: Chordata
- Class: Actinopterygii
- Order: Gadiformes
- Family: Moridae
- Genus: Physiculus
- Species: P. talarae

Binomial name
- Physiculus talarae Hildebrand & F. O. Barton, 1949

= Physiculus talarae =

Species of fish

Physiculus talarae, the Peruvian mora, is a species of bathydemersal fish found in the eastern Pacific Ocean.

== Size ==
This species reaches a length of 24.0 cm (9.4 in).
