= Physiculus huloti =

Conservation status
- Least Concern (IUCN 3.1)

Scientific classification
- Kingdom: Animalia
- Phylum: Chordata
- Class: Actinopterygii
- Order: Gadiformes
- Family: Moridae
- Genus: Physiculus
- Species: P. huloti

Binomial name
- Physiculus huloti Poll, 1953

Species of fish

Physiculus huloti, the brown codling, is a species of bathydemersal fish found in the eastern Atlantic Ocean.

== Size ==
This species reaches a length of 18.0 cm (7.1 in).

== Etymology ==
The fish is named in honor of André Hulot, of the Institut National pour l'Etude Agronomique du Congo.
