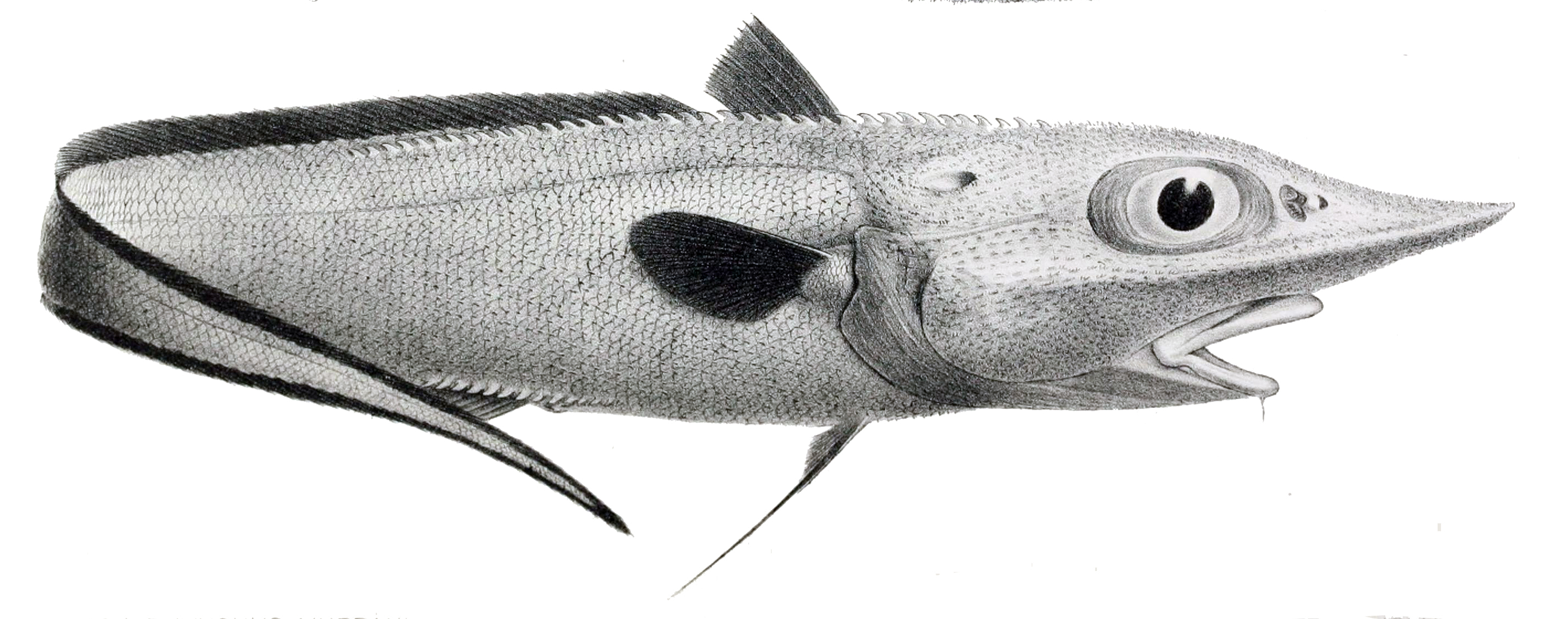

Conservation status
- Least Concern (IUCN 3.1)

Scientific classification
- Kingdom: Animalia
- Phylum: Chordata
- Class: Actinopterygii
- Order: Gadiformes
- Family: Trachyrincidae
- Genus: Trachyrincus
- Species: T. murrayi

Binomial name
- Trachyrincus murrayi (Günther, 1887)

Synonyms
- Trachyrhynchus murrayi Günther, 1887

= Roughnose grenadier =

Species of fish

The roughnose grenadier (Trachyrincus murrayi) is a species of fish in the subfamily Macrourinae (rat-tails). The species is named for Sir John Murray.

== Description ==
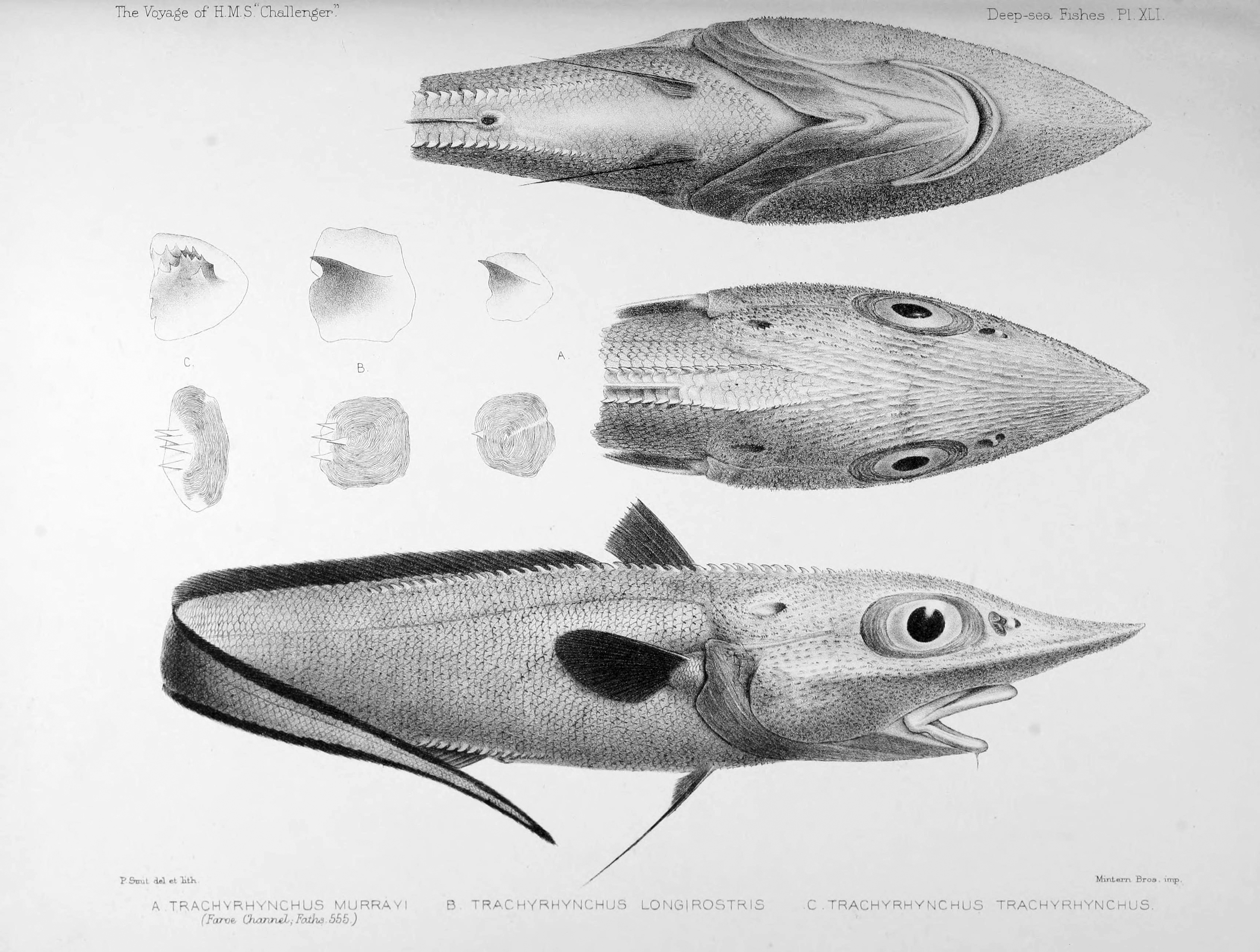
Ventral, dorsal and lateral views

The roughnose grenadier is grey in colour, up to 62 cm (24 in) in length. It has huge, bulbous black eyes and a sharp, pointed snout.

== Habitat ==
The roughnose grenadier is benthopelagic, living at depths of 500–1,630 m (1,640–5,350 ft) in the North Atlantic Ocean and Southwest Pacific.

== Behaviour ==
The roughnose grenadier spawns in March–May and feeds on crustaceans; it can live for 40 years.
