= Physiculus sterops =

Scientific classification
- Kingdom: Animalia
- Phylum: Chordata
- Class: Actinopterygii
- Order: Gadiformes
- Family: Moridae
- Genus: Physiculus
- Species: P. sterops

Binomial name
- Physiculus sterops Paulin, 1989

Species of fish

Physiculus sterops is a species of bathydemersal fish found in the eastern-central Pacific Ocean.
