= Physiculus nielseni =

Scientific classification
- Kingdom: Animalia
- Phylum: Chordata
- Class: Actinopterygii
- Order: Gadiformes
- Family: Moridae
- Genus: Physiculus
- Species: P. nielseni

Binomial name
- Physiculus nielseni Shcherbachev, 1993

Species of fish

Physiculus nielseni is a species of bathydemersal fish found in the western Indian Ocean.

== Etymology ==
The fish is named in honor of Danish ichthyologist Jørgen G. Nielsen (b. 1932), of the Zoological Museum of Copenhagen.
