= Physiculus longifilis =

Scientific classification
- Domain: Eukaryota
- Kingdom: Animalia
- Phylum: Chordata
- Class: Actinopterygii
- Order: Gadiformes
- Family: Moridae
- Genus: Physiculus
- Species: P. longifilis

Binomial name
- Physiculus longifilis M. C. W. Weber, 1913

Species of fish

Physiculus longifilis, the filament cod, is a species of bathydemersal fish found in the western Pacific Ocean.

== Size ==
This species reaches a length of 7.6 cm (3.0 in).
