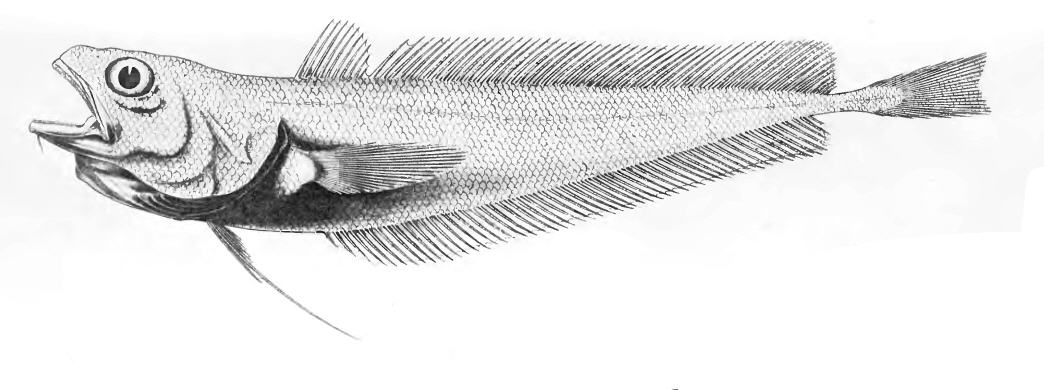

Scientific classification
- Domain: Eukaryota
- Kingdom: Animalia
- Phylum: Chordata
- Class: Actinopterygii
- Order: Gadiformes
- Family: Moridae
- Genus: Physiculus
- Species: P. argyropastus

Binomial name
- Physiculus argyropastus Alcock, 1894

= Physiculus argyropastus =

Species of fish

Physiculus argyropastus is a species of bathydemersal fish found in the Indian Ocean.
