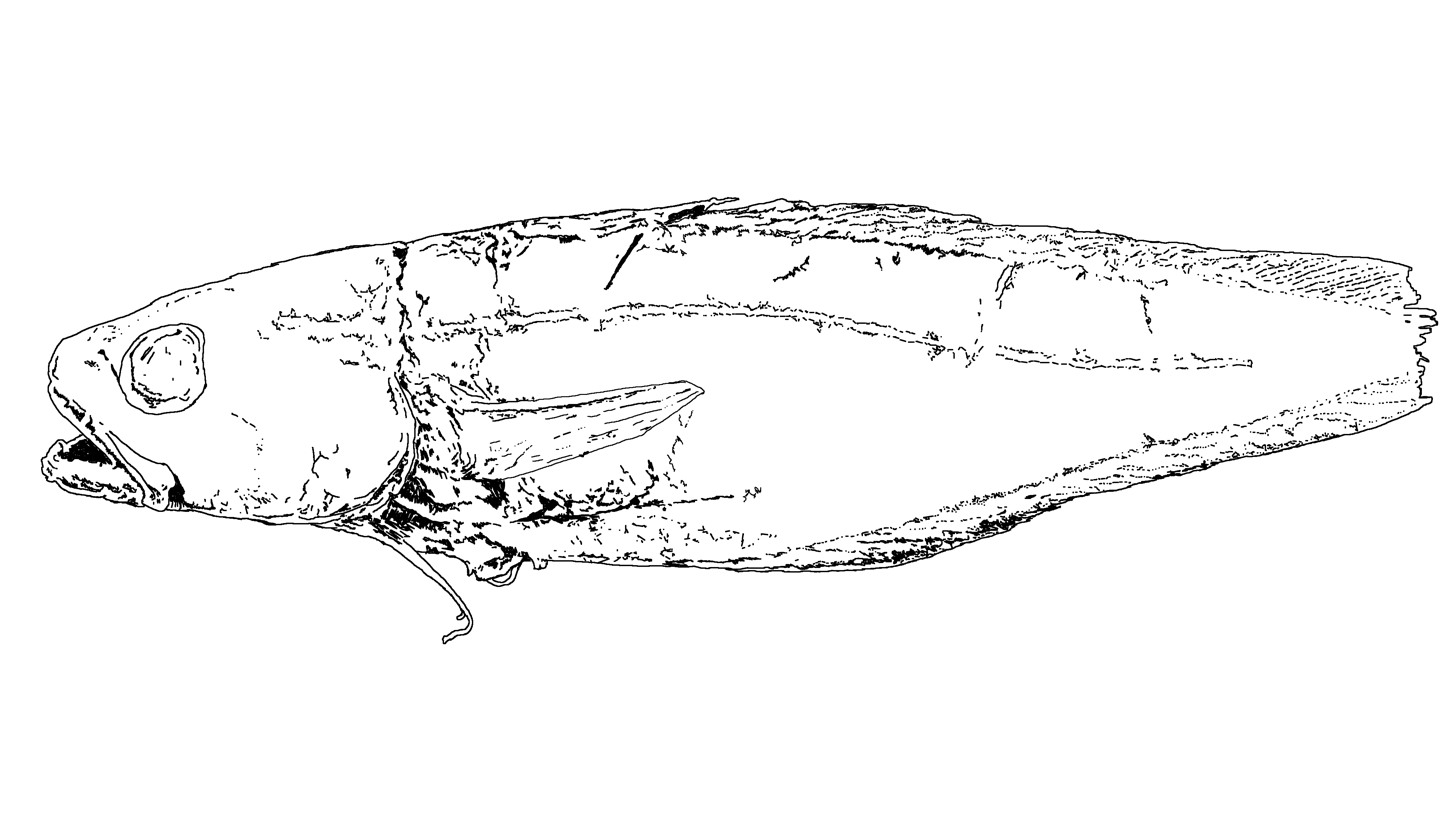
- Illustration

Conservation status
- Data Deficient (IUCN 3.1)

Scientific classification
- Kingdom: Animalia
- Phylum: Chordata
- Class: Actinopterygii
- Order: Gadiformes
- Family: Moridae
- Genus: Physiculus
- Species: P. helenaensis

Binomial name
- Physiculus helenaensis Paulin, 1989

= Skulpin =

Species of fish

The skulpin (Physiculus helenaensis), also known as the St Helena mora, is a species of morid cod endemic to the waters around Saint Helena. This species reaches 30 cm (12 in) in total length.
