= Dolichopteryx vityazi =

Scientific classification
- Domain: Eukaryota
- Kingdom: Animalia
- Phylum: Chordata
- Class: Actinopterygii
- Order: Argentiniformes
- Family: Opisthoproctidae
- Genus: Dolichopteryx
- Species: D. vityazi

Binomial name
- Dolichopteryx vityazi Parin, Belyanina & Evseenko, 2009

Species of fish

Dolichopteryx vityazi is a species of fish found in the Pacific Ocean.

== Description ==
This species reaches a length of 6.1 cm (2.4 in).

== Etymology ==
The fish is named in honor of the ship R/V Vityaz (also spelled Vitiaz), from which the first author caught the type specimen on the ship's 26th cruise.
