= Physiculus karrerae =

Conservation status
- Least Concern (IUCN 3.1)

Scientific classification
- Kingdom: Animalia
- Phylum: Chordata
- Class: Actinopterygii
- Order: Gadiformes
- Family: Moridae
- Genus: Physiculus
- Species: P. karrerae

Binomial name
- Physiculus karrerae Paulin, 1989

Species of fish

Physiculus karrerae, the Japanese codling, is a species of bathydemersal fish found in the Atlantic Ocean.

== Description ==
This species reaches a length of 27.4 cm (10.8 in).

== Etymology ==
The fish is named in honor of German ichthyologist Christine Karrer, because of her contributions to the knowledge of morid fishes.
