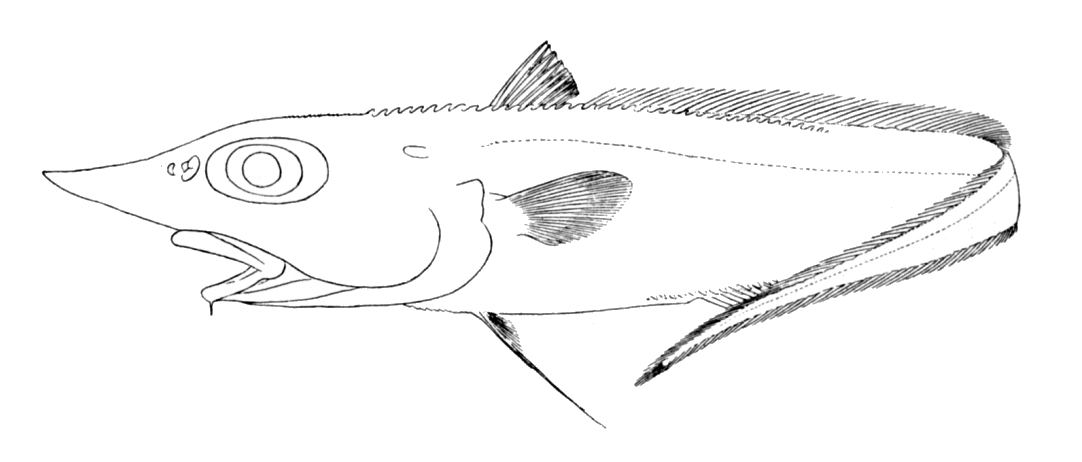

Conservation status
- Least Concern (IUCN 3.1)

Scientific classification
- Kingdom: Animalia
- Phylum: Chordata
- Class: Actinopterygii
- Order: Gadiformes
- Suborder: Macrouroidei
- Family: Trachyrincidae
- Genus: Trachyrincus
- Species: T. scabrus

Binomial name
- Trachyrincus scabrus (Rafinesque, 1810)

Synonyms
- Oxycephas scabrus Rafinesque, 1810; Trachyrincus anonyme Giorna, 1809; Lepidoleprus trachyrincus Risso, 1810; Trachyrincus trachyrincus (Risso, 1810)

= Trachyrincus scabrus =

Species of fish

Trachyrincus scabrus, the roughsnout grenadier or Mediterranean longsnout grenadier, is a species of bathydemersal marine fish from the subfamily Trachyrincinae, part of the family Macrouridae. It is found in the eastern Atlantic Ocean and the Mediterranean.

== Description ==
Trachyrincus scabrus has a large head which measures a quarter to a thirds of the length of the body and which has along, pointed snout with a ridge on side which extends posteriorly to the operculum, The mouth lies beneath the snout and the large eye has a diameter of 24-29% of the head length. The anterior dorsal fin has 11-12 fin rays, the posterior begins just behind the anterior and is much longer than the anal fin. The pectoral fin has 20-22 fin rays and the pelvic fin has 7 fin rays, although it may infrequently it has 6. It has spiny scales which are enlarged along dorsal and ventral profiles, 23-42 such scales sit dorsally behind a vertical line from the anus, but there are none ventrally before the anus. They are greyish-brown in colour. It grows to over 50 cm in total length.

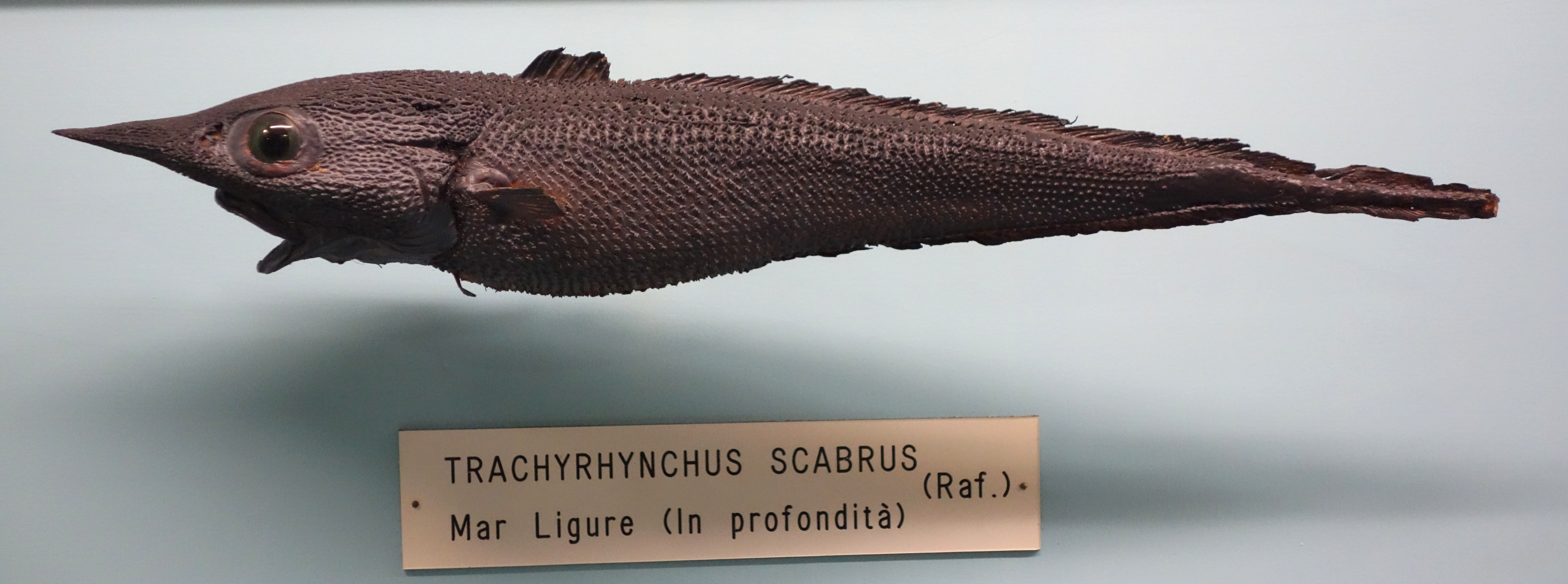
Museo Civico di Storia Naturale Giacomo Doria - Genoa, Italy - DSC03200

== Distribution ==
The roughsnout grenadier occurs in the eastern Atlantic from the continental slope off western Ireland south to Namibia, including the waters off the Azores and the Cape Verde Islands. In the Mediterranean Sea it is known from the waters around Spain and Morocco, the Ligurian Sea and the seas around Greece.

== Habitat and biology ==
Trachyrincus scabrus is a bathydemersal, non-migratory fish which occurs at depths which range from 400m to 1,700m over soft substrates. Its main food is pelagic copepods but also takes mysids, shrimps, cephalopods, fish, polychaetes and gastropods. This species spawns in winter, during February and March in the Mediterranean. The maximum recorded age of species is 10 year, the specimen being collected in the Ionian Sea.

== Fisheries ==
T. scabrus is taken as bycatch throughout its range but it is usually utilised to make fishmeal and oil. International Council for the Exploration of the Sea (ICES) has advised that for the years 2016–2020 there should be no directed fisheries effort for this species and that any bycatch should be counted against the total allowable catch so that any potential misreporting through misidentification is minimised. In most years landings were negligible and in the only year ICES had statistics, 2012, 57 tonnes were landed in the whole of the north-east Atlantic.
