= Physiculus grinnelli =

Scientific classification
- Kingdom: Animalia
- Phylum: Chordata
- Class: Actinopterygii
- Order: Gadiformes
- Family: Moridae
- Genus: Physiculus
- Species: P. grinnelli

Binomial name
- Physiculus grinnelli D. S. Jordan & E. K. Jordan, 1922

Species of fish

Physiculus grinnelli is a bathydemersal fish found in the eastern-central Pacific Ocean.

== Size ==
This species reaches a length of 27.3 cm (10.7 in).

== Etymology ==
The fish is named in honor of lepidopterist Fordyce Grinnell Jr. (1882–1943), who as a former student of David Starr Jordan, visited the Honolulu fish markets daily looking for specimens.
