= Rankinian =

Rankinian Temporal range: Santonian-Campanian

Scientific classification
- Kingdom: Animalia
- Phylum: Chordata
- Class: Actinopterygii
- Order: Gadiformes
- Genus: †Rankinian; David, 1946

Rankinian is an extinct genus of prehistoric bony fish that lived from the Santonian to the Campanian.

== See also ==
- Prehistoric fish
- List of prehistoric bony fish
