= Dolichopteryx pseudolongipes =

Scientific classification
- Domain: Eukaryota
- Kingdom: Animalia
- Phylum: Chordata
- Class: Actinopterygii
- Order: Argentiniformes
- Family: Opisthoproctidae
- Genus: Dolichopteryx
- Species: D. pseudolongipes

Binomial name
- Dolichopteryx pseudolongipes Fukui, Kitagawa & Parin, 2008

Species of fish

Dolichopteryx pseudolongipes is a species of fish found off California and Galapagos Islands in the eastern-central Pacific Ocean.

== Description ==
This species reaches a length of 8.0 cm (3.1 in).
