= Physiculus beckeri =

Scientific classification
- Kingdom: Animalia
- Phylum: Chordata
- Class: Actinopterygii
- Order: Gadiformes
- Family: Moridae
- Genus: Physiculus
- Species: P. beckeri

Binomial name
- Physiculus beckeri Shcherbachev, 1993

Species of fish

Physiculus beckeri is a species of bathydemersal fish found in the western Indian Ocean.

== Etymology ==
The fish is named in honor of ichthyologist Vladimir Eduardovich Becker (1925–1995), of the Institute of Oceanology in Moscow.
