= Physiculus luminosus =

Scientific classification
- Kingdom: Animalia
- Phylum: Chordata
- Class: Actinopterygii
- Order: Gadiformes
- Family: Moridae
- Genus: Physiculus
- Species: P. luminosus

Binomial name
- Physiculus luminosus Paulin, 1983

Species of fish

Physiculus luminosus, the luminescent cod, is a species of bathydemersal fish found in the Pacific Ocean.

== Description ==
This species reaches a length of 30.0 cm (11.8 in).
