= Dolichopteryx minuscula =

Scientific classification
- Domain: Eukaryota
- Kingdom: Animalia
- Phylum: Chordata
- Class: Actinopterygii
- Order: Argentiniformes
- Family: Opisthoproctidae
- Genus: Dolichopteryx
- Species: D. minuscula

Binomial name
- Dolichopteryx minuscula Fukui & Kitagawa, 2006

Species of fish

Dolichopteryx minuscula is a species of fish found in the Indo-West Pacific including Mauritius and Japan.

== Description ==
This species reaches a length of 6.0 cm (2.4 in).
