= Dolichopteryx rostrata =

Conservation status
- Least Concern (IUCN 3.1)

Scientific classification
- Kingdom: Animalia
- Phylum: Chordata
- Class: Actinopterygii
- Order: Argentiniformes
- Family: Opisthoproctidae
- Genus: Dolichopteryx
- Species: D. rostrata

Binomial name
- Dolichopteryx rostrata Fukui & Kitagawa, 2006

Species of fish

Dolichopteryx rostrata is a species of fish found around the Hebrides Islands in the north-eastern Atlantic Ocean.

== Description ==
This species reaches a length of 6.6 cm (2.6 in).
