= Dolichopteryx anascopa =

Conservation status
- Data Deficient (IUCN 3.1)

Scientific classification
- Kingdom: Animalia
- Phylum: Chordata
- Class: Actinopterygii
- Order: Argentiniformes
- Family: Opisthoproctidae
- Genus: Dolichopteryx
- Species: D. anascopa

Binomial name
- Dolichopteryx anascopa A. B. Brauer, 1901

Species of fish

Dolichopteryx anascopa is a species of fish found in the sub-Antarctic waters of the Atlantic Ocean, the Indian Ocean and south-eastern Pacific Ocean.

== Description ==
This species reaches a length of 17.3 cm (6.8 in).
