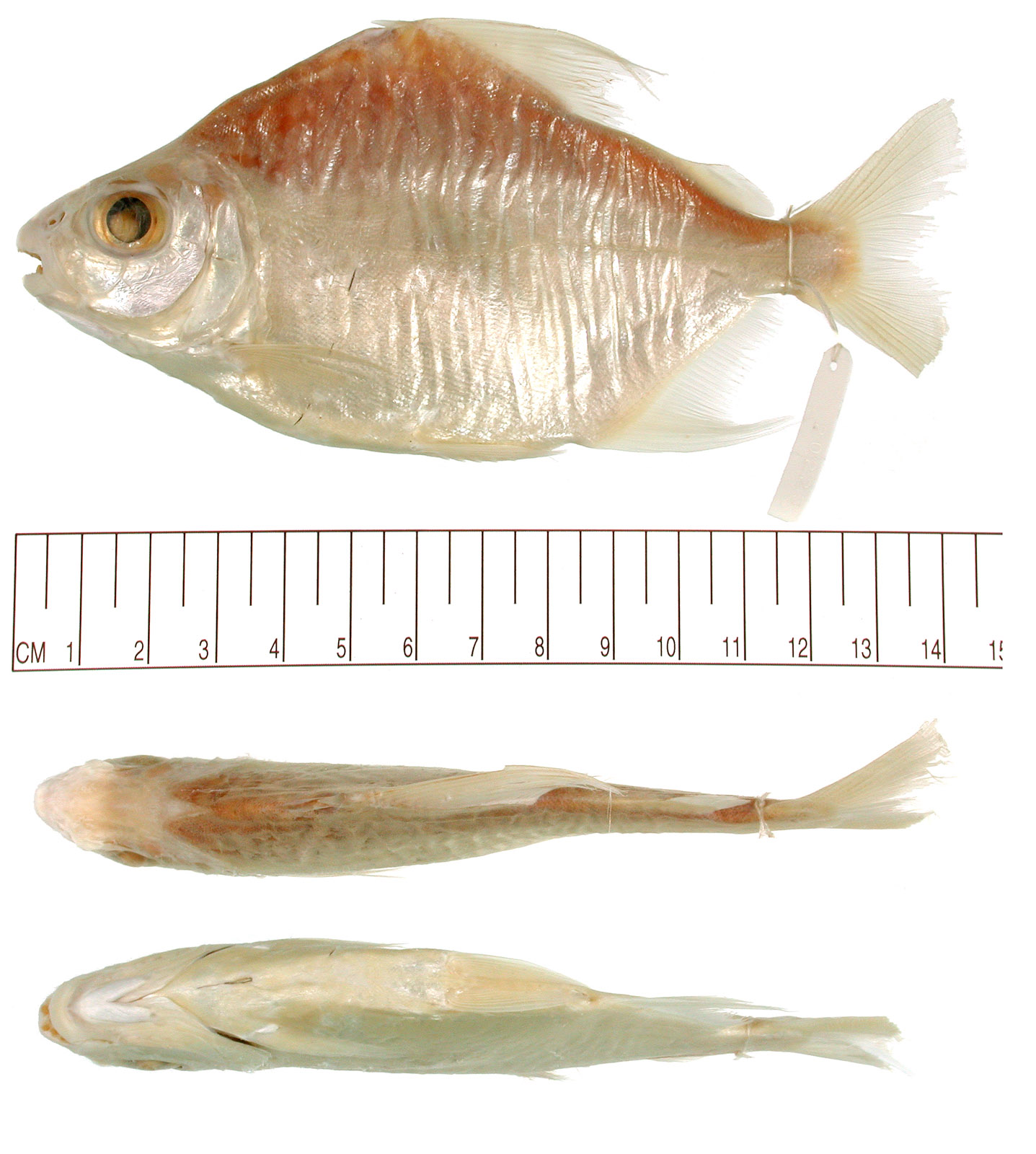

Conservation status
- Least Concern (IUCN 3.1)

Scientific classification
- Kingdom: Animalia
- Phylum: Chordata
- Class: Actinopterygii
- Order: Characiformes
- Family: Serrasalmidae
- Genus: Acnodon
- Species: A. normani

Binomial name
- Acnodon normani Gosline, 1951

= Acnodon normani =

Species of fish

Acnodon normani, the sheep-pacu, is a species of freshwater ray-finned fish belonging to the family Serrasalmidae, which includes the pacus and piranhas. This species is found in the Amazon River basin of Brazil.

== Taxonomy ==
Acnodon normani was first formally described in 1951 by the American ichthyologist William Alonzo Gosline with its type locality given as the Rio Santa Teresa, a western tributary of the upper Rio Tocantins in Goias State, Brazil. This species is classified in the genus Acnodon which belongs to the subfamily Myleinae in the family Serrasalmidae which is classified in the suborder Characoidei of the order Characiformes.

== Etymology ==
Acnodon normani is classified in the genus Acnodon, a name which prefixies a-, meaning without, onto knodon, which means "the projecting teeth on a hunting spear", an allusion to the mistaken perception that the type species of the genus, A. oligacanthus, does not have a spine in front of its dorsal fin, it actually does but it is very small. The Specific name honors of ichthyologist J. R. (John Roxborough) Norman, of the British Museum of Natural History, in recognition of his "excellent work" on the serrasalmids, among the other fish groups he studied.

== Description ==
Acnodon normani can be distinguished from A. oligacanthus in the possession odf a more acute snout and the lower jaw being shorter than the upper jaw. The premaxillary teeth of A. normani are very widely separated, to a greater extent than in any related species. This ish has silvery flanks with bluish stripes running down from the back to the lateral line. The membrane of the dorsal fin is dusky and the caudal fin has a dusky margin. The sheep pacu has a maximum published total length of 19.9 cm (7.8 in) and a maximum published weight of 110 g (3.9 oz).

== Distribution ==
Acnodon normani is endemic to Brazil where it is known from the Xingu and Tocantins-Araguaia river basins in states of Mato Grosso, Pará and Tocantins. Theare are two records of this fish from the Tapajós river system but these need confirmation.
