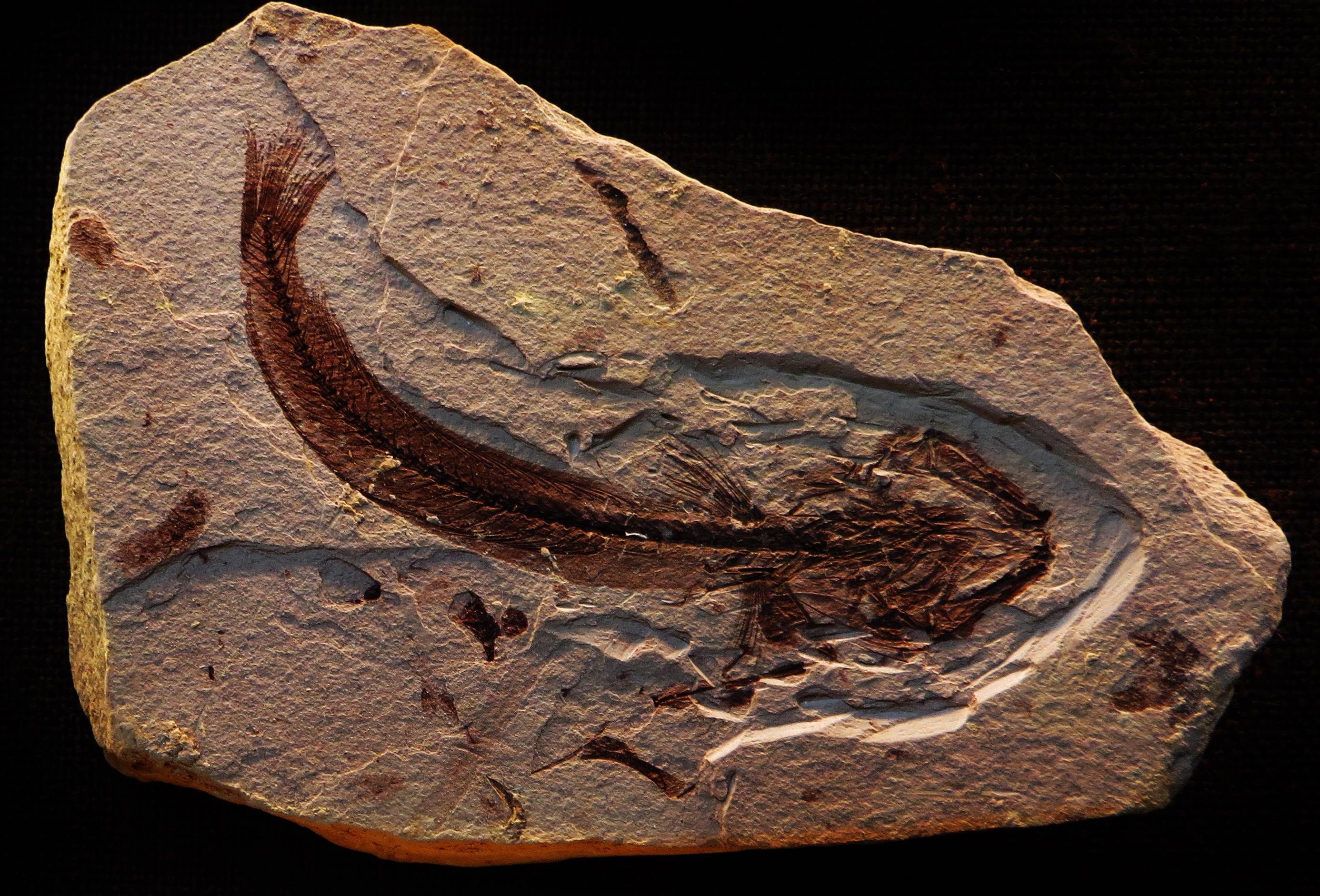

Scientific classification
- Domain: Eukaryota
- Kingdom: Animalia
- Phylum: Chordata
- Class: Actinopterygii
- Order: Gadiformes
- Family: Merlucciidae
- Genus: Palaeogadus; Von Rath 1859

= Palaeogadus =

Palaeogadus Temporal range: Early Oligocene to Middle Miocene

Extinct genus of fishes

Palaeogadus is an extinct genus of prehistoric bony fish. It was a nektonic carnivore found in coastal and estuarine marine environments, with fossils found from the Oligocene to Miocene at sites in Denmark, Germany, Poland, Georgia, and Azerbaijan.

== See also ==
- Prehistoric fish
- List of prehistoric bony fish
