= Dolichopteryx parini =

Scientific classification
- Kingdom: Animalia
- Phylum: Chordata
- Class: Actinopterygii
- Order: Argentiniformes
- Family: Opisthoproctidae
- Genus: Dolichopteryx
- Species: D. parini

Binomial name
- Dolichopteryx parini Kobyliansky & Fedorov, 2001

Species of fish

Dolichopteryx parini, the winged spookfish, is a species of fish found in the Pacific Ocean.

== Description ==
This species reaches a length of 21.7 cm (8.5 in).

== Etymology ==
The fish is named in honor of ichthyologist Nikolai Vasilyevich Parin (1932-2012), of the Russian Academy of Sciences.
