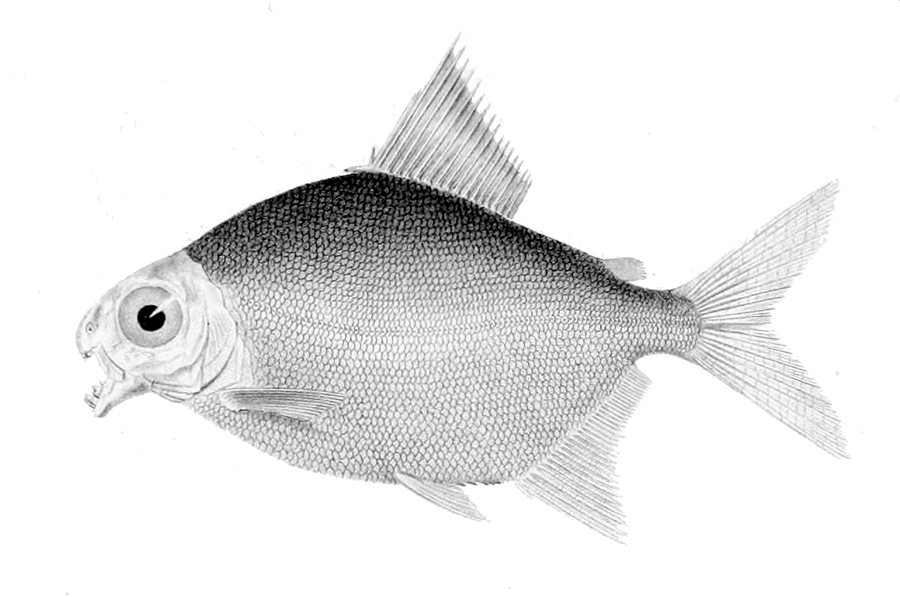
- A. oligacanthus

Scientific classification
- Kingdom: Animalia
- Phylum: Chordata
- Class: Actinopterygii
- Order: Characiformes
- Family: Serrasalmidae
- Subfamily: Myleinae
- Genus: Acnodon; C. H. Eigenmann, 1903

Type species
- Myleus oligacanthus J. P. Müller & Troschel, 1844

= Acnodon =

Genus of fishes

Acnodon is a genus of freshwater ray-finned fish belonging to the family Serrasalmidae, which includes the pacus and piranhas. The fishes in this genus are found in South America

== Species ==
Acnodon contains the following valid species:

- Acnodon normani Gosline, 1951
- Acnodon oligacanthus (J. P. Müller & Troschel, 1844)
- Acnodon senai Jégu & dos Santos, 1990
