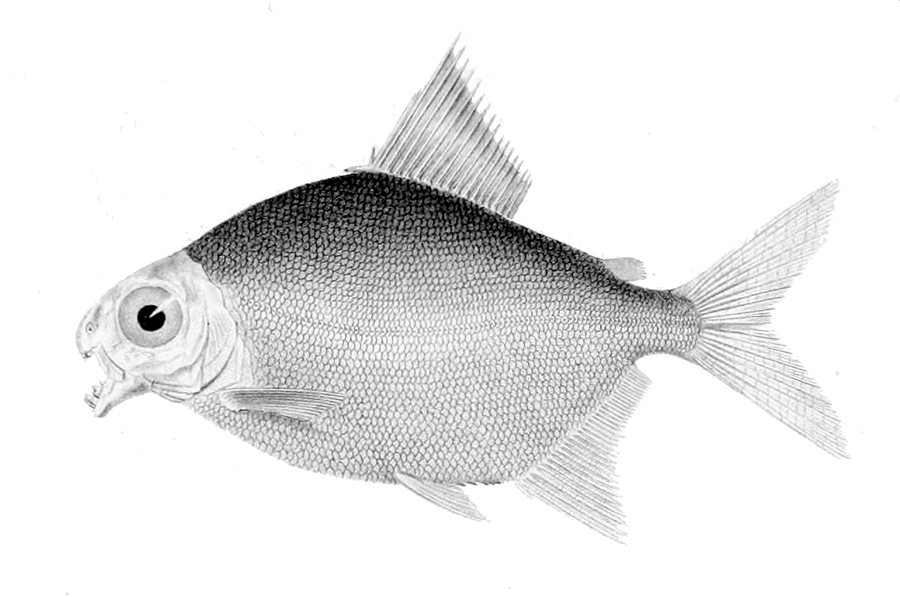
- A. oligacanthus

Conservation status
- Least Concern (IUCN 3.1)

Scientific classification
- Kingdom: Animalia
- Phylum: Chordata
- Class: Actinopterygii
- Order: Characiformes
- Family: Serrasalmidae
- Genus: Acnodon
- Species: A. oligacanthus

Binomial name
- Acnodon oligacanthus (J. P. Müller & Troschel, 1844)

Synonyms
- Myleus oligacanthus Müller & Troschel, 1844

= Acnodon oligacanthus =

Species of fish

Acnodon oligacanthus, the slender pacu, is a species of freshwater ray-finned fish belonging to the family Serrasalmidae, which includes the pacus and piranhas. This fish is found in South America.

== Taxonomy ==
Acnodon oligacanthus was first formally described as Myleus oligacanthus in 1844 by the German zoologists Johannes Peter Müller and Franz Hermann Troschel with its type loacliaty given as Suriname. In 1903 Carl H. Eigenmann proposed the new monospecific genus Acnodon with M. oligacanthus designated as its type species. Acnodon belongs to the subfamily Myleinae in the family Serrasalmidae which is classified in the suborder Characoidei of the order Characiformes.

== Etymology ==
Acnodon oligacanthus is the type species of the genus Acnodon, a name which prefixes a-, meaning without, onto knodon, which means "the projecting teeth on a hunting spear", an allusion to the mistaken perception that this species does not have a spine in front of its dorsal fin, it actually does, but it is very small. The Specific name oligacanthus, combines the Greek lígos, meaning "little", "small" or "few", with ákantha, meaning "thorn", alluding to the small and difficult to discern spine to the front of the origin of the dorsal fin.

== Description ==
Acnodon oligacanthus has a maximum published total length of 20 cm (7.9 in).

== Distribution ==
Acnodon oligacanthus has been confirmed to occur in the Maroni and Mana rivers in French Guiana and in the Maronwijne and Suriname rivers. Its presence in Amapá, Brazil and Guyana have still to be confirmed.

== Biology ==
Acnodon oligacanthus has a relatively large eye and this suggests that this species is crepuscular. It is a vegetation species and its inferior mouth indicates that it feeds on benthic vegetation. The juveniles occur in small streams with sandy beds where the water is clear to "tea stained", not basic and of low electrical conductivity. Once the juveniles reach between 5 and 10 cm (2.0 and 3.9 in) in length they migrate to larger rives where the school together close the bank and over sandbars in shallow water. The adults are solitary, preferring beds of aquatic vegetation in the main river channels. Slender pacus have a diet of benthic vegetation such as Podostemaceae as well as feeding on seeds, fruits and flowers which fall into the water.

== Utilisation ==
Acnodon oligacanthus is fished for by subsistence fishers and it is a minor component of the international aquarium trade.
