= John Roxborough Norman =

English ichthyologist

John Roxborough Norman (1898 – 26 May 1944) was an English ichthyologist who named many species of fish. He is known for his works A History of Fishes (1931) and A Draft Synopsis of the Orders, Families and Genera of Recent Fishes (1957).

== Early life ==
John Roxborough Norman was born in 1898.

== Career ==
Norman started his employment as a clerk in a bank, aged 16.

His lifetime affliction with rheumatic fever began during his military service during the First World War.

He entered the British Museum in 1921, where he worked for Charles Tate Regan (1878–1943). From 1939 to 1944, he was in charge of the Natural History Museum at Tring as the curator of zoology.

Norman was the author of, among others, A History of Fishes (1931) and A Draft Synopsis of the Orders, Families and Genera of Recent Fishes (1957). He followed the tradition of Albert C. L. G. Günther in his work.

== Taxon described by him ==
- See Category:Taxa named by John Roxborough Norman

== Death and legacy ==
Norman died on 26 May 1944 of streptococcus and endocarditis.

=== Taxon named in his honour ===
- The fish Acnodon normani Gosline, 1951
- The fish Physiculus normani Brüss, 1986
- The fish Poropanchax normani (Ahl, 1928)
- The mote sculpin Normanichthys crockeri H. W. Clark, 1937
