= Nikolai Vasilyevich Parin =

Russian ichthyologist and marine biologist

- Николай Васильевич Парин (Russian)
- Born: November 21, 1932; Perm, Soviet Union
- Died: April 18, 2012 (aged 79); Moscow, Russian Federation
- Education: Moscow Institute for Fisheries
- Awards: Leo S. Berg Gold Medal and the USSR State Prize
- Scientific career
- Fields: Ichthyology and biogeography
- Workplaces: P.P. Shirshov Institute of Oceanology, Russian Academy of Sciences, Moscow
- Theses: The Flying Fishes Exocoetidae and Oxyporhamphidae (1961); Ichthyofauna of the Oceanic Epipelagic (1968)
- Doctoral advisor: Teodore S. Rass, Anatoly Andriyashev, and G. Lindberg
- Author abbrev. (zoology): Parin

Nikolai Vasilyevich Parin (21 November 1932 – 18 April 2012) was a Soviet and Russian ichthyologist, specializing in oceanic pelagic fish. He headed the Laboratory of Oceanic Ichthyofauna at the RAS Institute of Oceanology in Moscow, where he ended his career as a Professor after more than fifty-seven years. In his career, he described more than 150 new taxa of fish and participated in 20 major oceanic expeditions. Thirty-six species of fish are named in his honour.

== Personal life ==
Parin was born in Perm on 21 November 1932. His father was Vasily Vasilevich Parin, who was the founder and first Secretary General of the USSR Academy of Medicine but later was made politically suspect due to a trip to the United States and a dispute with Trofim Lysenko. After the death of Stalin in 1953 and rise of Khrushchev, his father was rehabilitated and played a key medical role in the Soviet space program.

Because of his father's imprisonment, Parin could not study physics at Moscow State University, as he originally had intended and instead studied fisheries in Moscow. He met his wife Olga in 1963 and married her in 1966. He had one son and two grandchildren. His son, Nick Jr., has published a number of papers on fossil fish.

== Career ==
His primary interest was in the taxonomy of oceanic fish, though interests in his long career later expanded to include the fish of the deep-water pelagic and the bottom-dwelling fish of coastal slopes and deep-water uprises.

Parin graduated with honours from the Moscow Institute of Fisheries in 1955 and shortly after began his life-long career at the P. P Shirshov Institute of Oceanology. He worked as a technician on the Vityav in Vladivostok until returning to complete his PhD on Exocoetidae and Oxyporhamphidae in 1961. His advisor was Theodore S. Rass. He later received a Doctor of Science for his work on the fish of the oceanic epipelagic in 1968, supervised by A. Andriashev and G. Lindberg. He served as editor-in-chief of the Voprosy Ikhtiologii, Russia's leading journal of ichyology, from 1988 to 2010. He was elected as a corresponding member to the Russian Academy of Sciences in 1994 and later was awarded the Leo S. Berg Gold Medal in 2000 for his work.

He won the USSR State Prize for his monograph on the Pacific Ocean. He was also elected as foreign member of the American Society of Ichthyologists and Herpetologists and as Vice President of the European Ichthyological Society.

== Taxon described by him ==
- See Category:Taxa named by Nikolai Vasilyevich Parin

== Taxon named in his honor ==
- Diaphus parini Becker, 1992, is a species of lanternfish found in the Southeast Pacific Ocean.
- The Winged spookfish, Dolichopteryx parini Kobyliansky & Fedorov, 2001, is a species of fish found in the Pacific Ocean.
- Physiculus parini Paulin, 1991 is a bathydemersal fish found in the Southeast Pacific Ocean.
- Plectranthias parini W. D. Anderson & J. E. Randall, 1991, Parin's anthias, is a species of fish in the family Serranidae occurring in the Southeast Pacific Ocean.
- The pocket shark Mollisquama parini.
- Nezumia parini Hubbs & Iwamoto 1977
- Gaidropsarus parini Svetovidov 1986
- The North Pacific Daggerfish, Anotopterus nikparini Kukuev 1998
- Bathypterois parini Shcherbachev & Sulak 1988
- Ichthyococcus parini Mukhacheva 1980
- Polyipnus parini Borodulina 1979
- Cetichthys parini Paxton, 1989
- Pectinantus parini Sazonov, 1976
