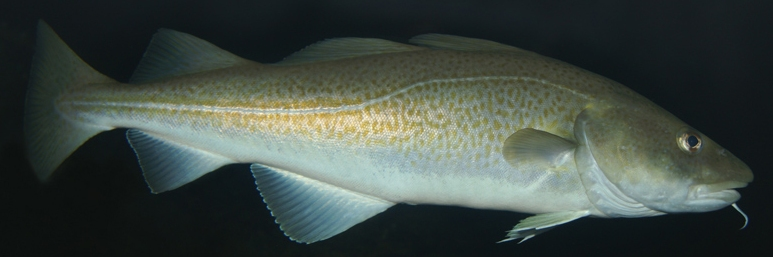
- Gadus morhua

Scientific classification
- Kingdom: Animalia
- Phylum: Chordata
- Class: Actinopterygii
- Clade: Zeiogadaria
- Order: Gadiformes; Goodrich, 1909

Type species
- Gadus morhua Linnaeus 1758

Families
- See text

= Gadiformes =

Gadiformes Temporal range: Maastrichtian–present

Order of fishes

Gadiformes /ˈɡædɪfɔːrmiːz/, also called the Anacanthini, are an order of ray-finned fish that include the cod, hakes, pollock, haddock, burbot, rocklings and moras, many of which are food fish of major commercial value. They are mostly marine fish found throughout the world and the vast majority are found in temperate or colder regions (tropical species are typically deep-water) while a few species may enter brackish estuaries. Pacific tomcods, one of the two species that makes up the genus Microgadus, are able to enter freshwater, but there is no evidence that they breed there. Some populations of landlocked Atlantic tomcod on the other hand, complete their entire life cycle in freshwater. Yet only one species, the burbot (Lota lota), is a true freshwater fish.

Common characteristics include the positioning of the pelvic fins (if present), below or in front of the pectoral fins. Gadiformes are physoclists, which means their swim bladders do not have a pneumatic duct. The fins are spineless. Gadiform fish range in size from the codlets, which may be as small as 7 cm (2.8 in) in adult length, to the Atlantic cod, Gadus morhua, which reaches up to 2 m (6.6 ft).

The earliest gadiforms are Palaeogadus weltoni from the Maastrichtian of the United States and the undescribed, informally named "Protocodus" from the Early Paleocene of Greenland.

== Taxonomy ==
The following classification is based on Eschmeyer's Catalog of Fishes:

- Order Gadiformes
  - Suborder Stylephoroidei
    - Family Stylephoridae Swainson, 1839 (tube-eyes or threadtails)
  - Suborder Bregmacerotoidei
    - Family Bregmacerotidae Gill, 1872 (codlets)
  - Suborder Gadoidei
    - Genus †Rhinocephalus Casier, 1966 (fossil; Early Eocene of England)
    - Family Phycidae Swainson, 1838 (phycid hakes)
    - Family Gaidropsaridae Jordan & Evermann, 1898 (rocklings)
    - Family Lotidae Bonaparte, 1835 (hakes and burbots)
    - Family Gadidae Rafinesque, 1810 (cods and haddocks)
  - Suborder Ranicipitoidei
    - Family Ranicipitidae Bonaparte, 1835 (tadpole fishes)
  - Suborder Merluccioidei
    - Family Merlucciidae Rafinesque, 1815 (merlucciid hakes)
  - Suborder Macrouroidei
    - Family Euclichthyidae Cohen, 1984 (Eucla cods)
    - Family Muraenolepididae Regan, 1903 (eel cods)
    - Family Melanonidae Goode & Bean, 1896 (arrowtails or pelagic cods)
    - Family Trachyrincidae Goode & Bean, 1896 (armoured grenadiers)
    - Family Moridae Moreau, 1881 (codlings or deepsea cods)
    - Family Macruronidae Regan, 1903 (blue grenadiers)
    - Family Lyconidae Günther, 1887 (Atlantic hakes)
    - Family Bathygadidae Jordan & Evermann, 1898 (rattails)
    - Family Steindachneriidae Parr, 1942 (luminous hakes)
    - Family Macrouridae Bonaparte, 1831 (grenadiers or rattails)
