= List of fishes of Ireland =

This is a list of species of fish found in the waters of Ireland. A separate list of freshwater fish is given at the bottom. The list includes fish from the Rockall Trough, which extends as deep as 3500 metres. None of those deep-water fish have been caught from shore or boat. ("Ireland claims an extended continental shelf ... up to more than 500 nautical miles (926 km), particularly in the Hatton–Rockall area".)

Icons which state each species' global IUCN status:
CR	Critically Endangered	In imminent risk of extinction in the wild
EN	Endangered	Facing an extremely high risk of extinction in the wild
VU	Vulnerable	Facing a high risk of extinction in the wild
NT	Near Threatened	Doesn't meet any criteria that would categorise it as risking extinction but likely to in the future
LC	Least Concern	No current identifiable risks to this species
DD	Data Deficient	Inadequate information to make an assessment of the risks to this species

== Class Myxini (hagfish) ==
=== Order Myxiniformes ===
==== Family Myxinidae ====
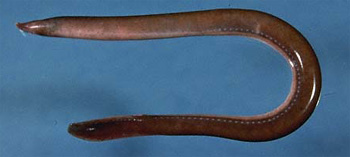
The Atlantic hagfish

- Atlantic hagfish, Myxine glutinosa LC
- White-headed hagfish, Myxine ios LC

== Hyperoartia ==
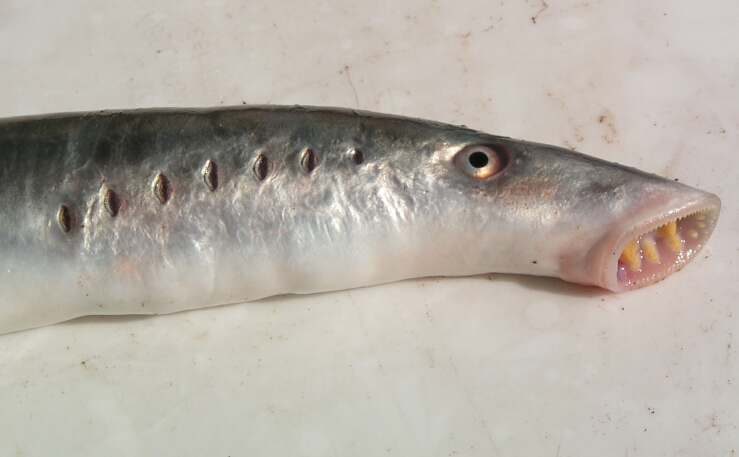
The European river lamprey, Lampetra fluviatilis

=== Order Petromyzontiformes (lampreys) ===
==== Family Petromyzontidae ====
- European river lamprey, Lampetra fluviatilis LC
- European brook lamprey, Lampetra planeri LC
- Sea lamprey, Petromyzon marinus NT

== Infraphylum Gnathostomata (jawed vertebrates) ==
=== Class Chondrichthyes (cartilaginous fish) ===
==== Subclass Elasmobranchii ====
===== Superorder Selachimorpha (sharks and dogfish) =====
====== Order Squatiniformes (angelsharks) ======
Family Squatinidae (angelsharks)

- Angel shark, Squatina squatina CR

====== Order Squaliformes (dogfishes and relatives) ======
Family Centrophoridae (gulper sharks)

- Little gulper shark, Centrophorus uyato
- Leafscale gulper shark, Centrophorus squamosus EN
- Gulper shark, Centrophorus granulosus
- Birdbeak dogfish, Deania calcea NT
- Rough longnose dogfish, Deania hystricosa

Family Dalatiidae

- Kitefin shark, Dalatias licha VU

Family Echinorhinidae (bramble and prickly sharks)

- Bramble shark, Echininorhinus brucus NE

Family Etmopteridae (lantern sharks)

- Black dogfish, Centroscyllium fabricii LC
- Great lanternshark, Etmopterus princeps NT
- Velvet belly lantern shark, Etmopterus spinax LC

Family Oxynotidae (rough sharks)

- Sailfin roughshark, Oxynotus paradoxus NT

Family Somniosidae (sleeper sharks)

- Portuguese dogfish, Centroscymnus coelolepis CR
- Longnose velvet dogfish, Centroselachus crepidater VU
- Smallmouth velvet dogfish, Scymnodon obscurus DD
- Knifetooth dogfish, Scymnodon ringens NT
- Greenland shark, Somniosus microcephalus NT
- Little sleeper shark , Somniosus rostratus
- Velvet dogfish, Zameus squamulosus

Family Squalidae (spiny dogfishes)

- Spiny dogfish, Squalus acanthias EN

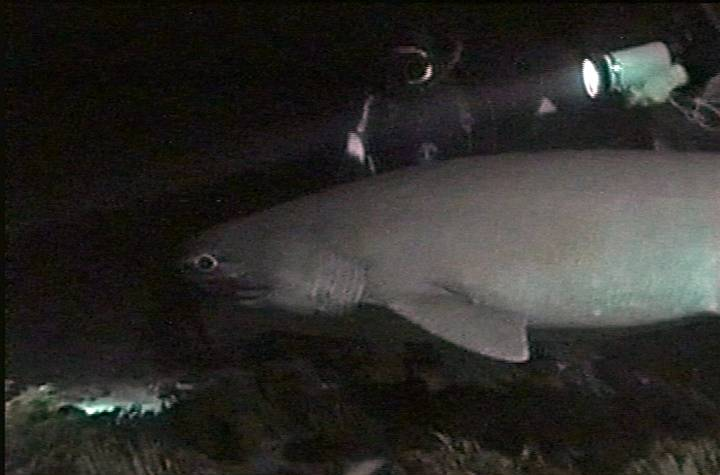
Hexanchus griseus

====== Order Hexanchiformes (frilled and cow sharks) ======
Family Chlamydoselachidae (frilled sharks)

- Frilled Shark, Chlamydoselachus anguineus NE

Family Hexanchidae (sixgill sharks)

- Bluntnose sixgill shark, Hexanchus griseus NT
- Sharpnose sevengill shark, Heptranchias perlo

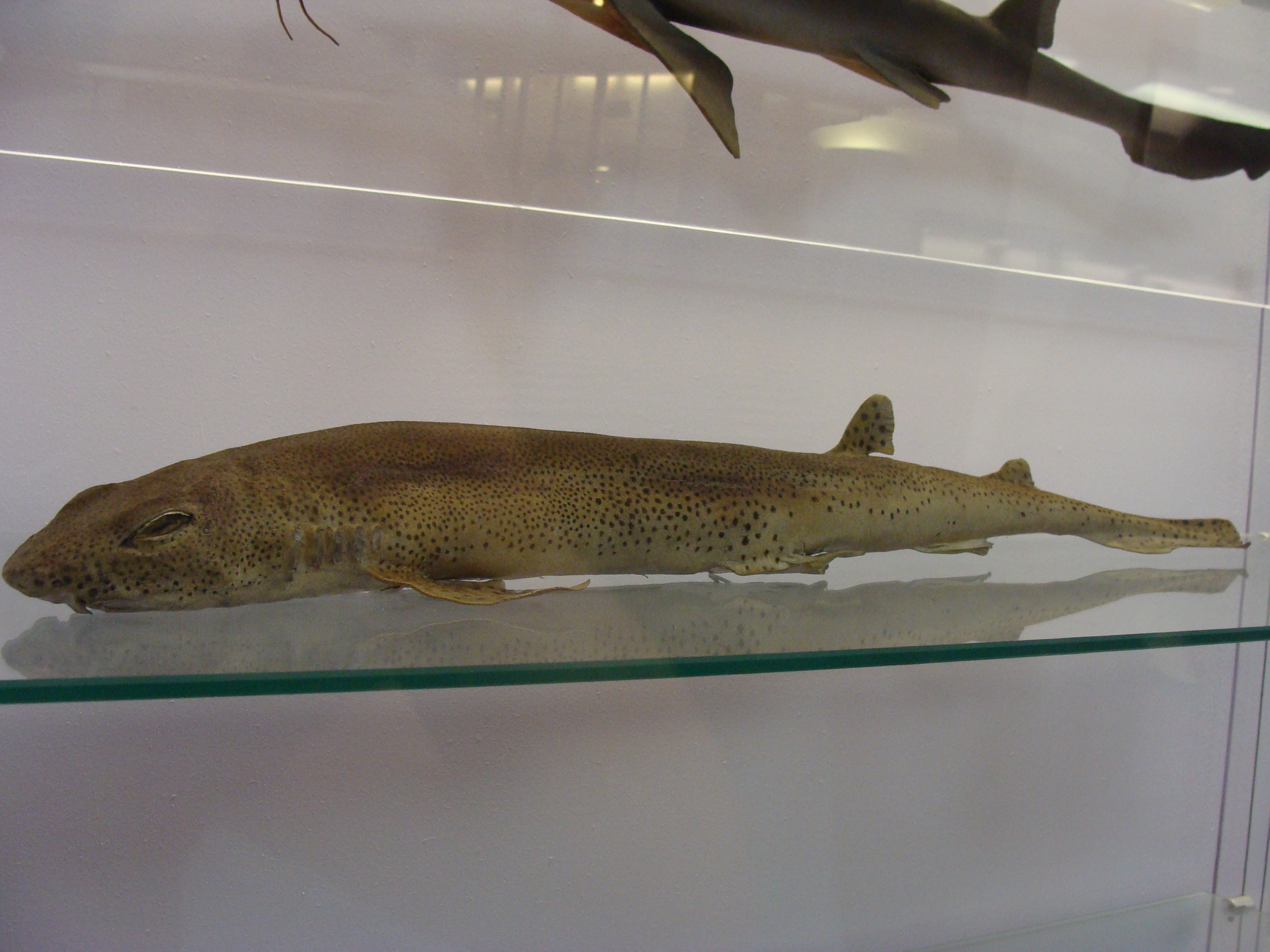
Scyliorhinus canicula in the Natural History Museum, London

====== Order Carcharhiniformes (ground sharks) ======
Family Pseudotriakidae

- False catshark, Pseudotriakis microdon

Family Carcharhinidae (requiem sharks)

- Blue shark, Prionace glauca NT

Family Scyliorhinidae (catsharks)

- Iceland catshark, Apristurus laurussonii LC
- White ghost catshark, Apristurus aphyodes
- Ghost catshark, Apristurus manis NT
- Black roughscale catshark, Apristurus melanoasper NT
- Smalleye catshark, Apristurus microps
- Blackmouth catshark, Galeus melastomus LC
- mouse catshark, Galeus murinus
- Lesser spotted dogfish, Scyliorhinus canicula LC
- Nursehound, Scyliorhinus stellaris LC

Family Sphyrnidae (hammerhead sharks)

- Smooth hammerhead, Sphyrna zygaena DD

Family Triakidae (houndsharks)

- Tope, Galeorhinus galeus VU
- Starry smooth-hound, Mustelus asterias LC

====== Order Lamniformes (mackerel sharks) ======
- Shortfin mako shark, Isurus oxyrinchus
- Porbeagle shark, Lamna nasus

Family Alopiidae (thresher sharks)

- Common thresher, Alopias vulpinus NE
- Bigeye thresher, Alopias superciliosus

Family Cetorhinidae (basking sharks)

- Basking shark, Cetorhinus maximus EN

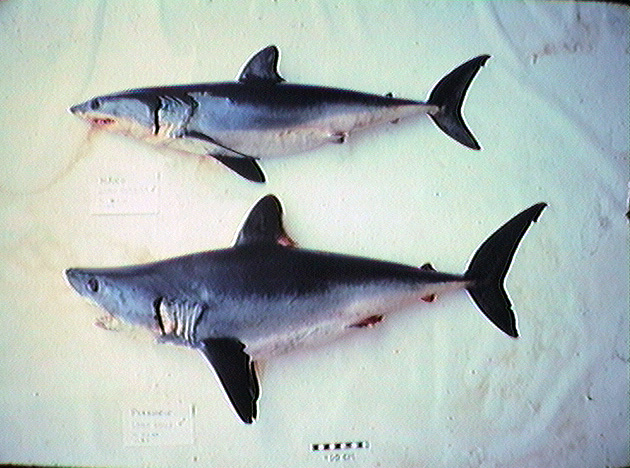
Comparison between a shortfin mako shark (Isurus oxyrhinchus) above, and porbeagle (Lamna nasus) below

Family Lamnidae (mackerel sharks)

- Shortfin mako shark, Isurus oxyrinchus NE
- Porbeagle, Lamna nasus CR

===== Superorder Batoidea (rays, skates and sawfishes) =====
====== Order Torpediniformes (electric rays) ======
- Atlantic torpedo, Tetronarce nobiliana NT
- Spotted torpedo, Torpedo marmorata LC

====== Order Myliobatiformes (rays) ======
Family Dasyatidae (whiptail stingrays)

- Common stingray, Dasyatis pastinaca EN
- Pelagic stingray, Pteroplatytrygon violacea NE

Family Myliobatidae (eagle rays)

- Common eagle ray, Myliobatis aquila NE

Family Mobulidae (devil rays)

- Devil fish, Mobula mobular NE

====== Order Rajiformes (skates) ======
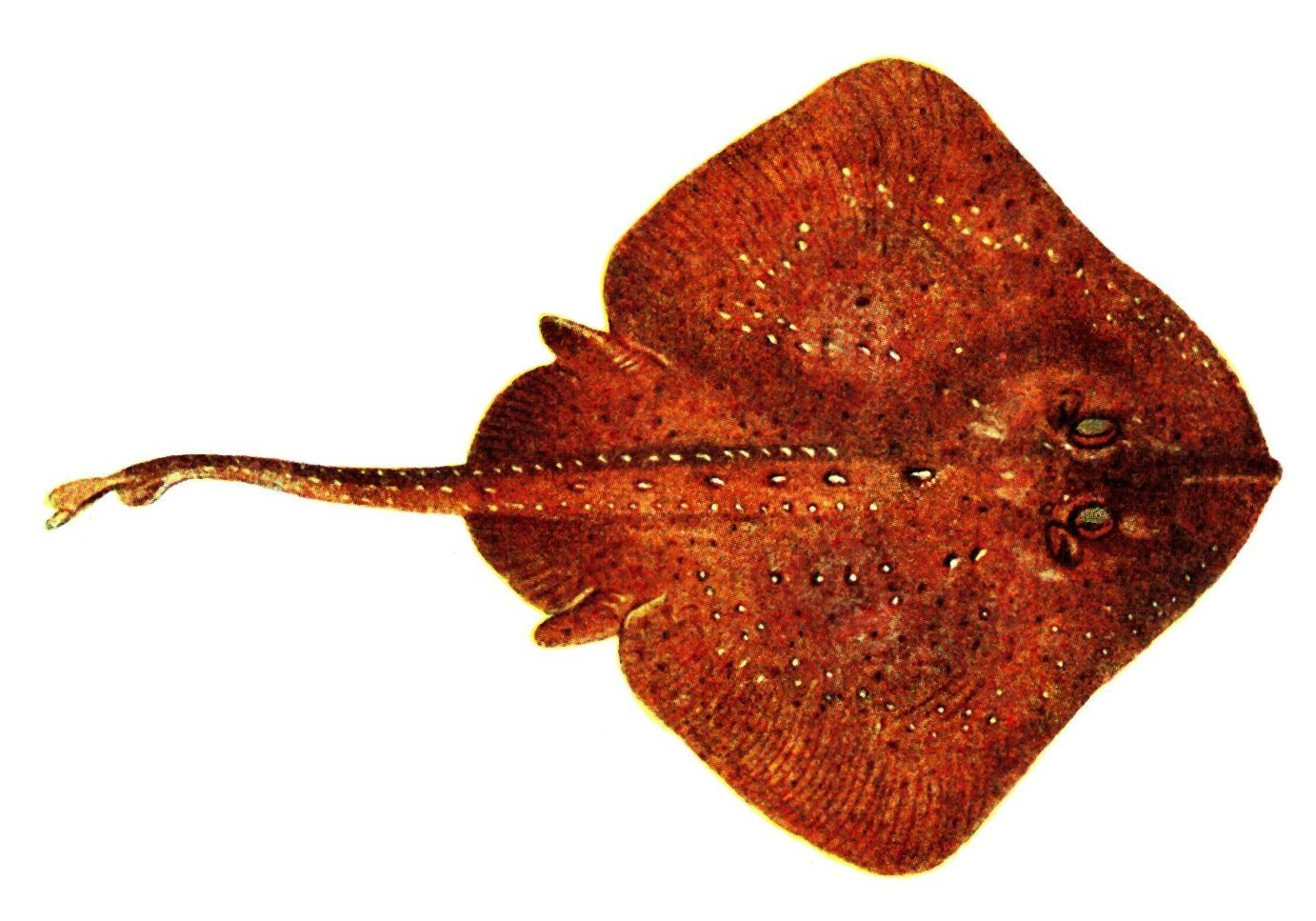
Raja clavata

Family Rajidae (skates)

- Thorny skate, Amblyraja radiata NE
- Blue skate, Dipturus batis CR
- Norwegian skate, Dipturus nidarosiensis NT
- Long-nosed skate, Dipturus oxyrinchus VU
- Flapper skate, Dipturus intermedius
- Sandy ray, Leucoraja circularis NT
- Blue ray, Neoraja caerulea NT
- Blonde ray, Raja brachyura NT
- Thornback ray, Raja clavata LC
- Shagreen ray, Raja fullonica VU
- Small-eyed ray, Raja microocellata LC
- Spotted ray, Raja montagui LC
- Cuckoo ray, Raja naevus
- Undulate ray, Raja undulata
- Deepwater ray, Rajella bathyphila
- Bigelow's ray, Rajella bigelowi
- Round ray, Rajella fyllae
- Bottlenosed skate, Rostroraja alba
- Richardson's ray, Bathyraja richardsoni

==== Subclass Holocephali ====
===== Order Chimaeriformes (chimaeras) =====
Family Rhinochimaeridae (longnose chimaeras)

- Narrownose chimaera, Harriotta raleighana
- Broadnose chimaera, Rhinochimaera atlantica

Family Chimaeridae (shortnose chimaeras)

- Rabbit fish, Chimaera monstrosa
- Opal chimaera, Chimaera opalescens
- Smalleyed rabbitfish, Hydrolagus affinis
- Large-eyed rabbitfish, Hydrolagus mirabilis
- Pale chimaera, Hydrolagus pallidus

=== Superclass Osteichthyes (boned fish) - class Actinopterygii (ray-finned fish) ===
==== Subclass Chondrostei ====
===== Order Acipenseriformes (sturgeons) =====
Family Acipenseridae (sturgeons)

- European sea sturgeon, Acipenser sturio

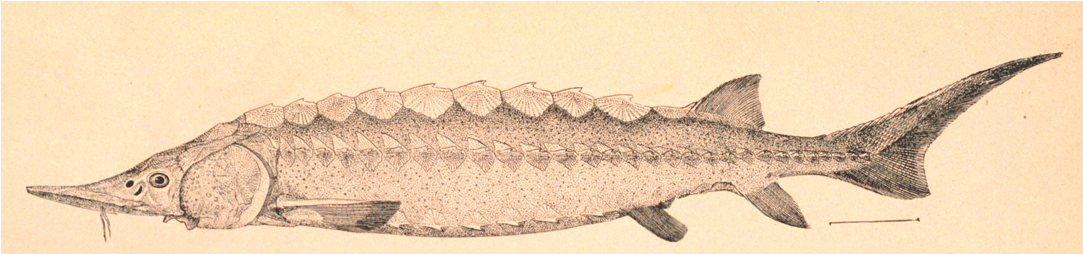
European sea sturgeon

==== Infraclass Holostei ====
===== Superorder Clupeomorpha =====
====== Order Clupeiformes (herring and anchovies) ======
Family Clupeidae (herring and sardines)

- Allis shad, Alosa alosa
- Twaite shad, Alosa fallax
- Atlantic herring, Clupea harengus
- Pilchard, Sardina pilchardus
- European sprat, Sprattus sprattus sprattus

Family Engraulidae (anchovies)

- European anchovy, Engraulis encrasicolus

===== Superorder Elopomorpha =====
====== Order Anguilliformes (true eels) ======
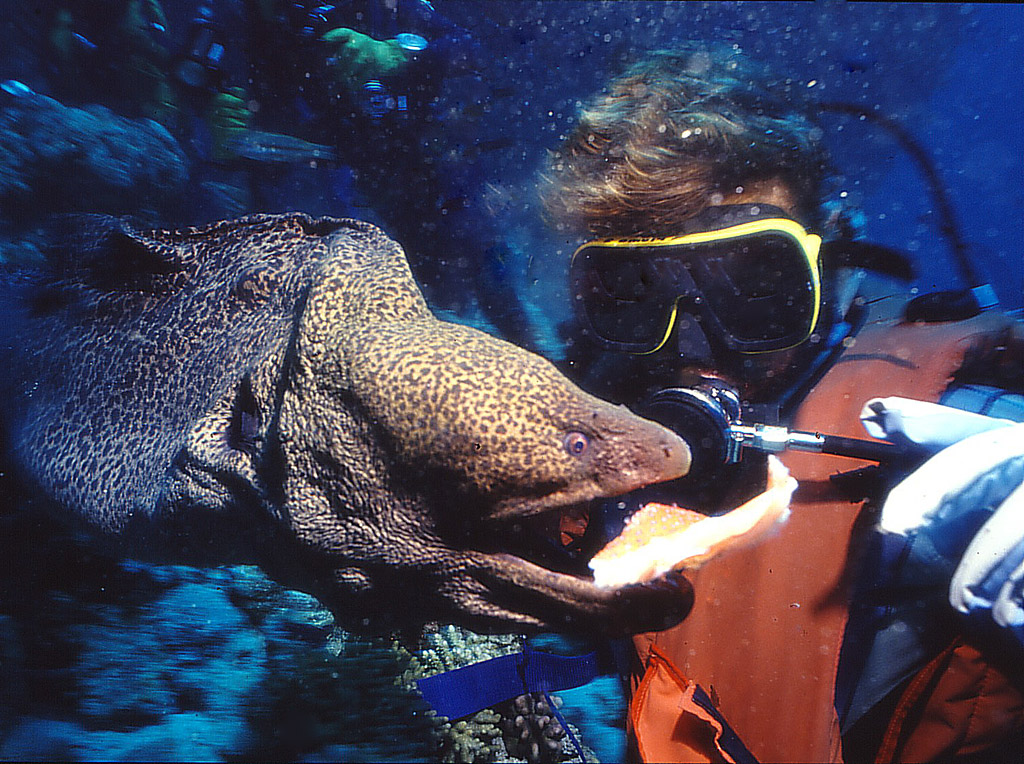
Moray eel

Family Anguillidae (freshwater eels)

- European eel, Anguilla anguilla

Family Congridae (conger eels)

- European conger, Conger conger

Family Muraenidae (moray eels)

- Mediterranean moray, Muraena helena

Family Nettastomatidae (duckbill eels)

- Whipsnout sorcerer, Venefica proboscidea

Family Synaphobranchidae (cutthroat eels)

- Deepwater arrowtooth eel, Histiobranchus bathybius
- Ilyophis arx
- Ilyophis blachei
- Muddy arrowtooth eel, Ilyophis brunneus
- Kaup's arrowtooth eel, Synaphobranchus kaupii

Family Derichthyidae (oceanic eels)

- Narrownecked oceanic eel, Derichthys serpentinus
- Duckbill oceanic eel, Nessorhamphus ingolfianus

Family Nemichthyidae (slender snipe eels)

- Slender snipe eel, Nemichthys scolopaceus
- Avocet snipe eel, Avocettina infans
- Shortgut fintail snipe eel, Labichthys carinatus

Family Serrivomeridae (saw-tooth eels)

- Bean's sawtooth eel, Serrivomer beanii

====== Order Notacanthiformes (halosaurs, spiny eels) ======
Family Halosauridae (halosaurs)

- Abyssal halosaur, Halosauropsis macrochir
- Sahara halosaur, Halosaurus johnsonianus

Family Notacanthidae (spiny eels)

- Shortfin spiny eel, Notacanthus bonaparte
- Snub-nosed spiny eel, Notacanthus chemnitzii
- Longnose tapirfish, Polyacanthonotus challengeri
- Smallmouth spiny eel, Polyacanthonotus rissoanus

====== Order Saccopharyngiformes (gulper eels) ======
Family Eurypharyngidae (pelican eels)

- Pelican eel, Eurypharynx pelecanoides

Family Saccopharyngidae (gulper eels)

- Gulper eel, Saccopharynx ampullaceus

===== Superorder Ostariophysi =====
====== Order Cypriniformes ======
Family Cyprinidae (carp and relatives)

- Common bream, Abramis brama
- Gudgeon, Gobio gobio
- Common dace, Leuciscus leuciscus
- Common minnow, Phoxinus phoxinus
- Common roach, Rutilus rutilus
- Common rudd, Scardinius erythrophthalmus
- European chub, Squalius cephalus
- Tench, Tinca tinca

Family Nemacheilidae (stone loaches)

- Stone loach, Barbatula barbatula

===== Superorder Protacanthopterygii =====
====== Order Alepocephaliformes ======
Family Platytroctidae (tubeshoulders)

- Bighead searsid, Holtbyrnia anomala
- Maul's searsid, Maulisia mauli
- Multipore searsid, Normichthys operosus
- Schnakenbeck's searsid, Sagamichthys schnakenbecki
- Koefoed's searsid, Searsia koefoedi

Family Alepocephalidae (slickheads)

- Risso's smooth-head, Alepocephalus rostratus
- Longfin smooth-head, Conocara macropterum
- Elongate smooth-head, Conocara microlepis
- Murray's smooth-head, Conocara murrayi
- Salmon smooth-head, Conocara salmoneum
- Agassiz' smooth-head, Leptochilichthys agassizii
- Blackhead salmon, Narcetes stomias
- Abyssal smooth-head, Rinoctes nasutus
- Softskin smooth-head, Rouleina attrita
- Bluntsnout smooth-head, Xenodermichthys copei

====== Order Argentiniformes ======
Family Argentinidae (herring smelts or argentines)

- Lesser argentine, Argentina sphyraena
- Greater argentine, Argentina silus

Family Microstomatidae (pencil smelts)

- Slender argentine, Microstoma microstoma
- Greenland argentine, Nansenia groenlandica
- Nansenia oblita

Family Bathylagidae (deep-sea smelts)

- Goiter blacksmelt, Bathylagus euryops

Family Opisthoproctidae (barreleyes)

- Barrel-eye, Opisthoproctus soleatus

====== Order Osmeriformes (smelts, etc.) ======
- European smelt, Osmerus eperlanus

====== Order Salmoniformes (salmon, trout, whitefish) ======
Family Salmonidae (salmon, trout, whitefish)

- Irish pollan, Coregonus autumnalis
- Common whitefish, Coregonus lavaretus
- Atlantic salmon, Salmo salar
- Brown trout, Salmo trutta
  - Sea trout, Salmo trutta trutta
- Arctic char, Salvelinus alpinus alpinus
- Cole's char, Salvelinus colii
- Coomsaharn char, Salvelinus fimbriatus
- Gray's char, Salvelinus grayi
- Blunt-snouted Irish char, Salvelinus obtusus

===== Superorder Stenopterygii =====
====== Order Stomiiformes ======
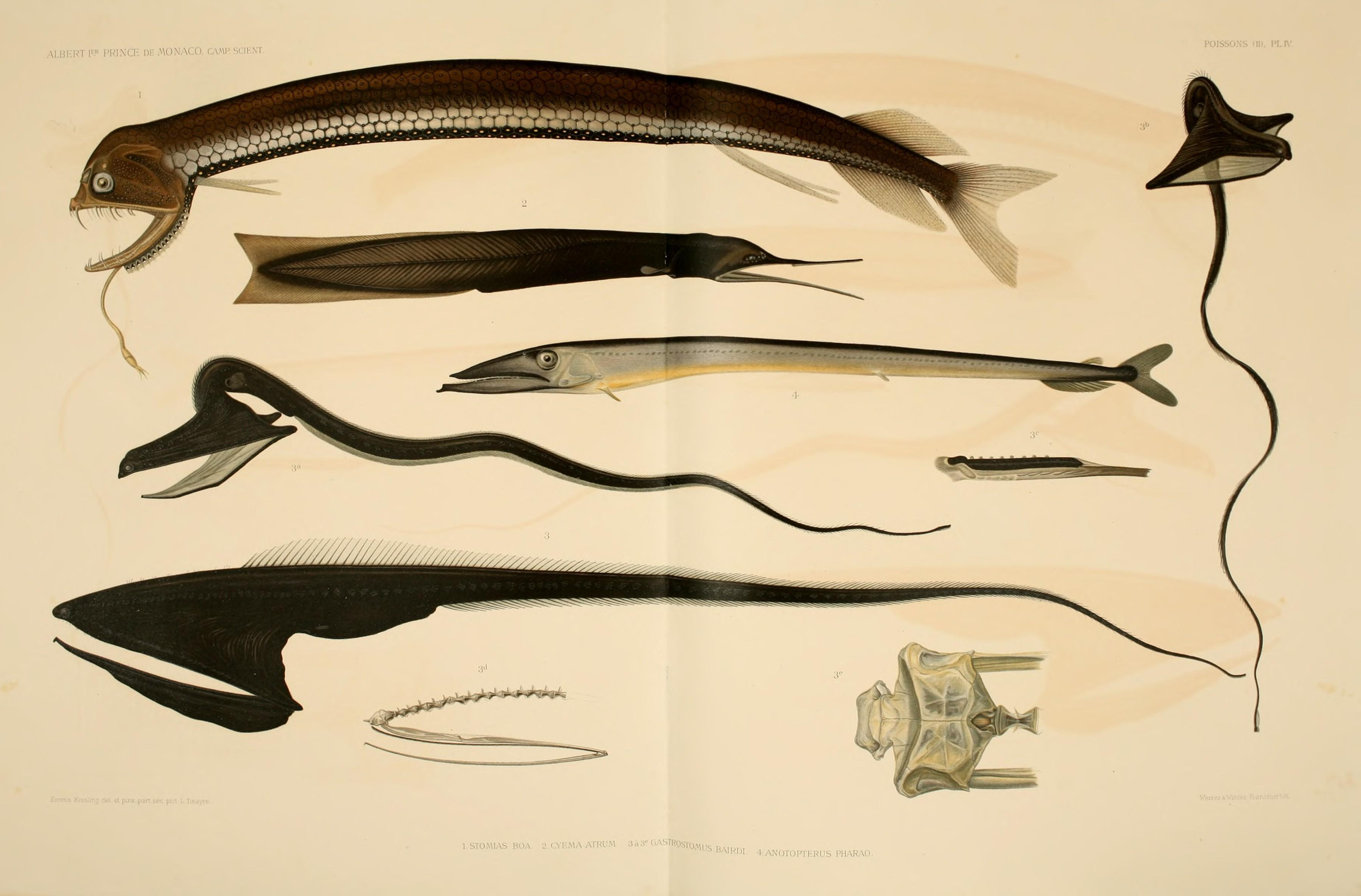
Stomias and Grammatostomias species

Family Gonostomatidae (bristlemouths)

- Longray fangjaw, Bonapartia pedaliota
- Bristlemouth, Cyclothone alba
- Spark anglemouth, Sigmops bathyphilus

Family Sternoptychidae (hatchefishes and relatives)

- Mueller's pearlside, Maurolicus muelleri
- Diaphanous hatchetfish, Sternoptyx diaphana
- Constellationfish, Valenciennellus tripunctulatus

Family Phosichthyidae (lightfishes)

- Rendezvous fish, Polymetme corythaeola
- Polymetme thaeocoryla

Family Stomiidae (dragonfishes)

- Large-eye snaggletooth, Borostomias antarcticus
- Grammatostomias flagellibarba
- Leptostomias gladiator
- Boa dragonfish, Stomias boa ferox
- Threelight dragonfish, Trigonolampa miriceps

===== Superorder Cyclosquamata =====
====== Order Aulopiformes (grinners, lizardfishes) ======
Family Notosudidae (waryfishes)

- Blackfin waryfish, Scopelosaurus lepidus

Family Paralepididae (barracudinas)

- Duckbill barracudina, Magnisudis atlantica
- Sharpchin barracudina, Paralepis coregonoides
- Sudis hyalina

===== Superorder Scopelomorpha =====
====== Order Myctophiformes (lanternfishes) ======
Family Myctophidae (lanternfishes)

- Glacier lanternfish, Benthosema glaciale
- Spothead lantern fish, Diaphus metopoclampus
- White-spotted lantern fish, Diaphus rafinesquii
- Chubby flashlightfish, Electrona risso
- Spotted lanternfish, Myctophum punctatum
- Topside lampfish, Notolychnus valdiviae
- Diamondcheek lanternfish, Lampanyctus intricarius
- Rakery beaconlamp, Lampanyctus macdonaldi
- Cocco's lantern fish, Lobianchia gemellarii
- Arctic telescope, Protomyctophum arcticum
- Large scale lantern fish, Symbolophorus veranyi

===== Acanthomorpha =====
====== Order Lampriformes ======
Family Lampridae (opahs)

- Opah, Lampris guttatus

Family Trachipteridae (ribbonfishes)

- Dealfish, Trachipterus arcticus

====== Order Zeiformes (dories, etc.) ======
Family Zeidae (dories)

- John Dory, Zeus faber

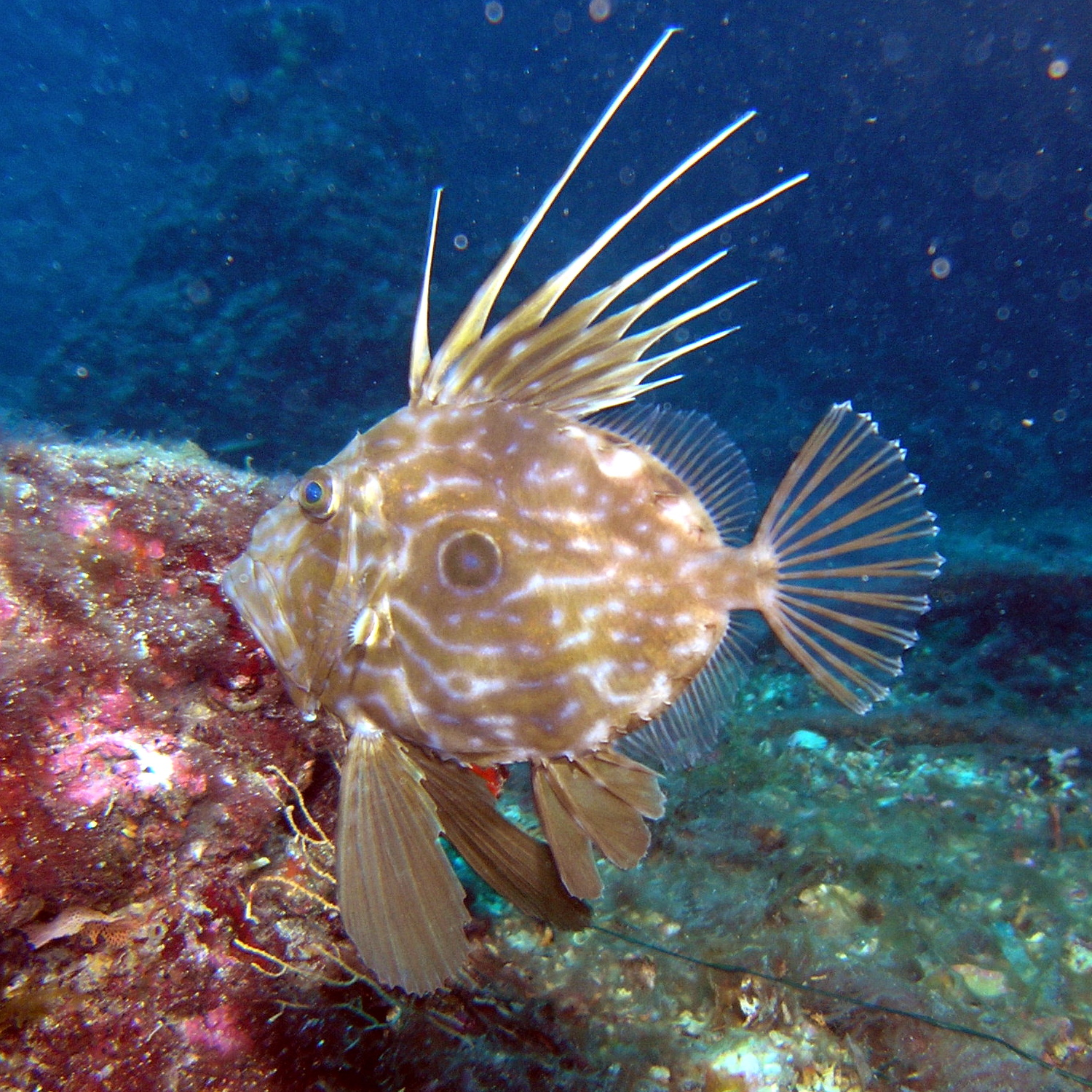
John Dory

Family Oreosomatidae (oreos)

- False boarfish, Neocyttus helgae

====== Order Gadiformes (cod and relatives) ======
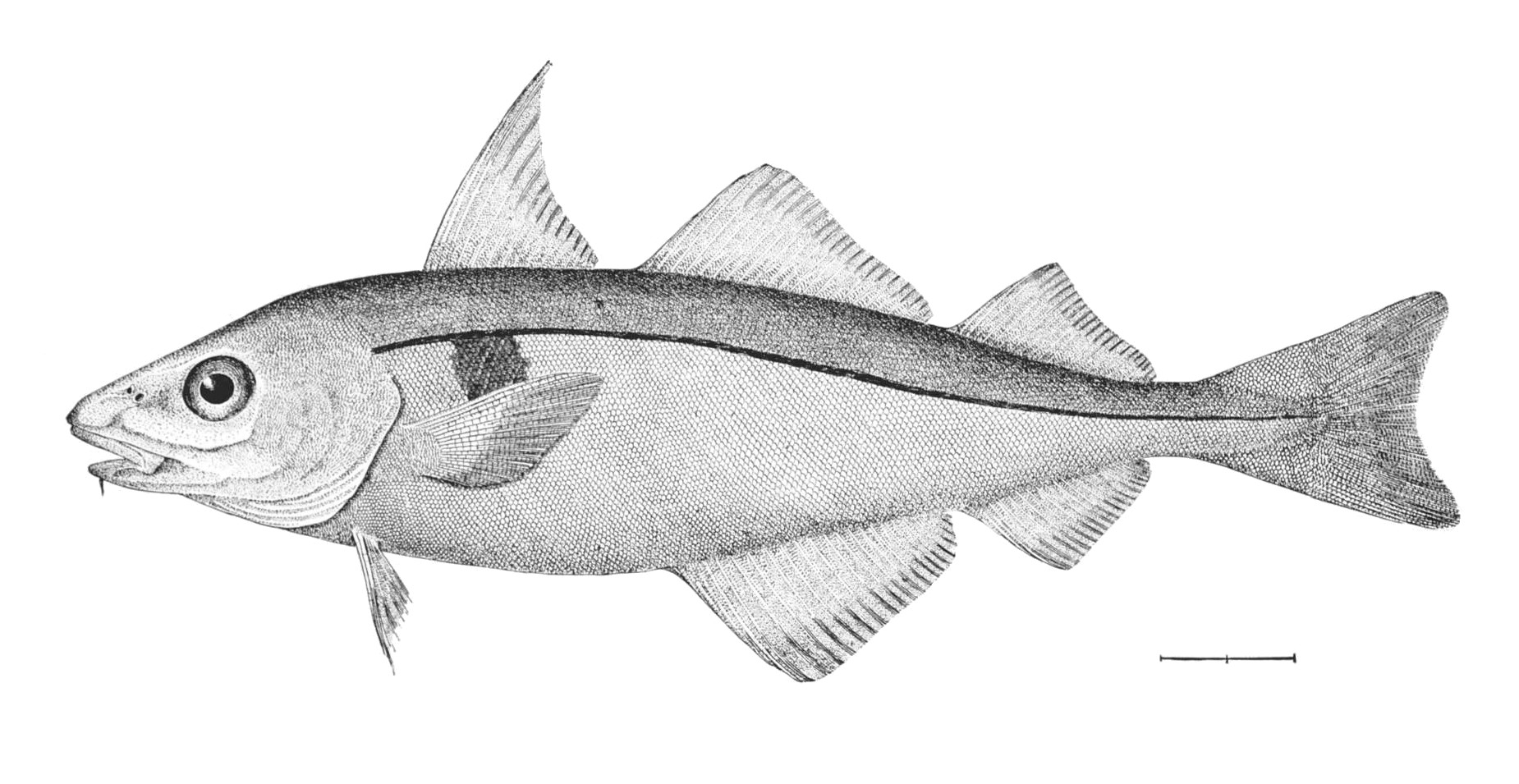
Melanogrammus aeglefinus

Family Gadidae (cod and relatives)

- Silvery cod, Gadiculus argenteus argenteus
- Silvery pout, Gadiculus argenteus thori
- Atlantic cod, Gadus morhua
- Whiting, Marlangius merlangus
- Haddock, Melanogrammus aeglefinus
- Blue whiting, Micromesistius poutassou
- Pollock, Pollachius pollachus

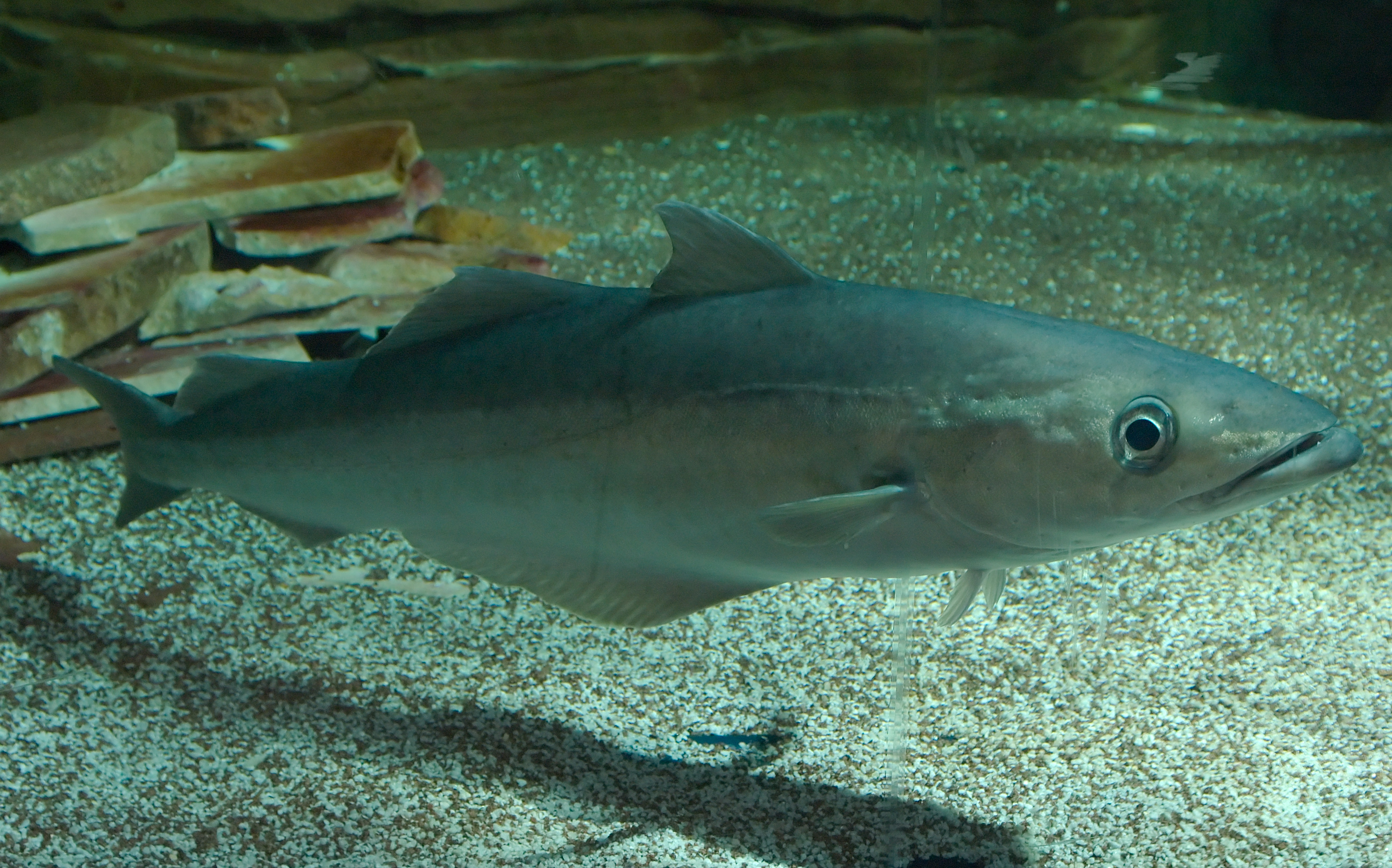
Pollachius pollachius

- Saithe, Pollachius virens
- Tadpole fish, Raniceps raninus
- Norway pout, Trisopterus esmarkii
- Pouting, Trisopterus luscus
- Poor cod, Trisopterus minutus

Family Lotidae (lings)

- Cusk, Brosme brosme
- Fivebeard rockling, Ciliata mustela
- Northern rockling, Ciliata septentrionalis
- Fourbeard rockling, Enchelyopus cimbrius
- Arctic rockling, Gaidropsarus argentatus
- Bigeye rockling, Gaidropsarus macrophthalmus
- Shore rockling, Gaidropsarus mediterraneus
- Three-bearded rockling, Gaidropsarus vulgaris
- Burbot, Lota lota
- Blue ling, Molva dypterygia
- Spanish ling, Molva macrophthalma
- Common ling, Molva molva

Family Macrouridae (grenadiers or rattails)

- Hollowsnout grenadier, Coelorinchus caelorhincus
- Spearsnouted grenadier, Coelorinchus labiatus
- Abyssal grenadier, Coryphaenoides armatus
- Coryphaenoides brevibarbis
- Carapine grenadier, Coryphaenoides carapinus
- Günther's grenadier, Coryphaenoides guentheri
- Ghostly grenadier, Coryphaenoides leptolepis
- Mediterranean grenadier, Coryphaenoides mediterraneus
- Deepwater grenadier, Coryphaenoides profundicolus
- Roundnose grenadier, Coryphaenoides rupestris
- Glasshead grenadier, Hymenocephalus italicus

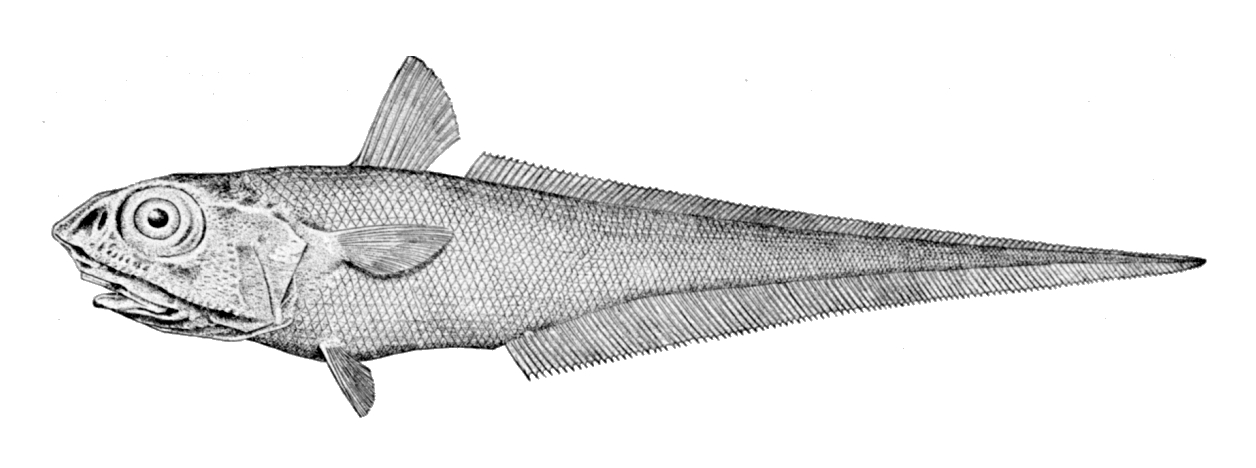
Macrourus berglax

- Onion-eye grenadier, Macrourus berglax
- Softhead grenadier, Malacocephalus laevis
- Common Atlantic grenadier, Nezumia aequalis
- Paracetonurus flagellicauda

Family Merlucciidae (hakes)

- Lyconus brachycolus
- European hake, Merluccius merluccius

Family Moridae (codlings)

- Guttigadus latifrons
- Slender codling, Halargyreus johnsonii
- North Atlantic codling, Lepidion eques
- Common mora, Mora moro

Family Phycidae (forkbeard hakes)

- Greater forkbeard, Phycis blennoides

Family Trachyrincidae

- Roughnose grenadier, Trachyrincus murrayi
- Roughsnout grenadier, Trachyrincus scabrus

===== Superorder Acanthopterygii =====
====== Order Beryciformes (alfonsinos, bigscales, ridgeheads) ======
Family Berycidae (alfonsinos)

- Alfonsino, Beryx decadactylus

Family Melamphaidae (bigscales)

- Crested bigscale, Poromitra crassiceps
- Bean's bigscale, Scopelogadus beanii

====== Oder Trachichthyiformes (spinyfins, roughies and relatives) ======
Family Diretmidae (spinyfins)

- Silver spinyfin, Diretmus argenteus

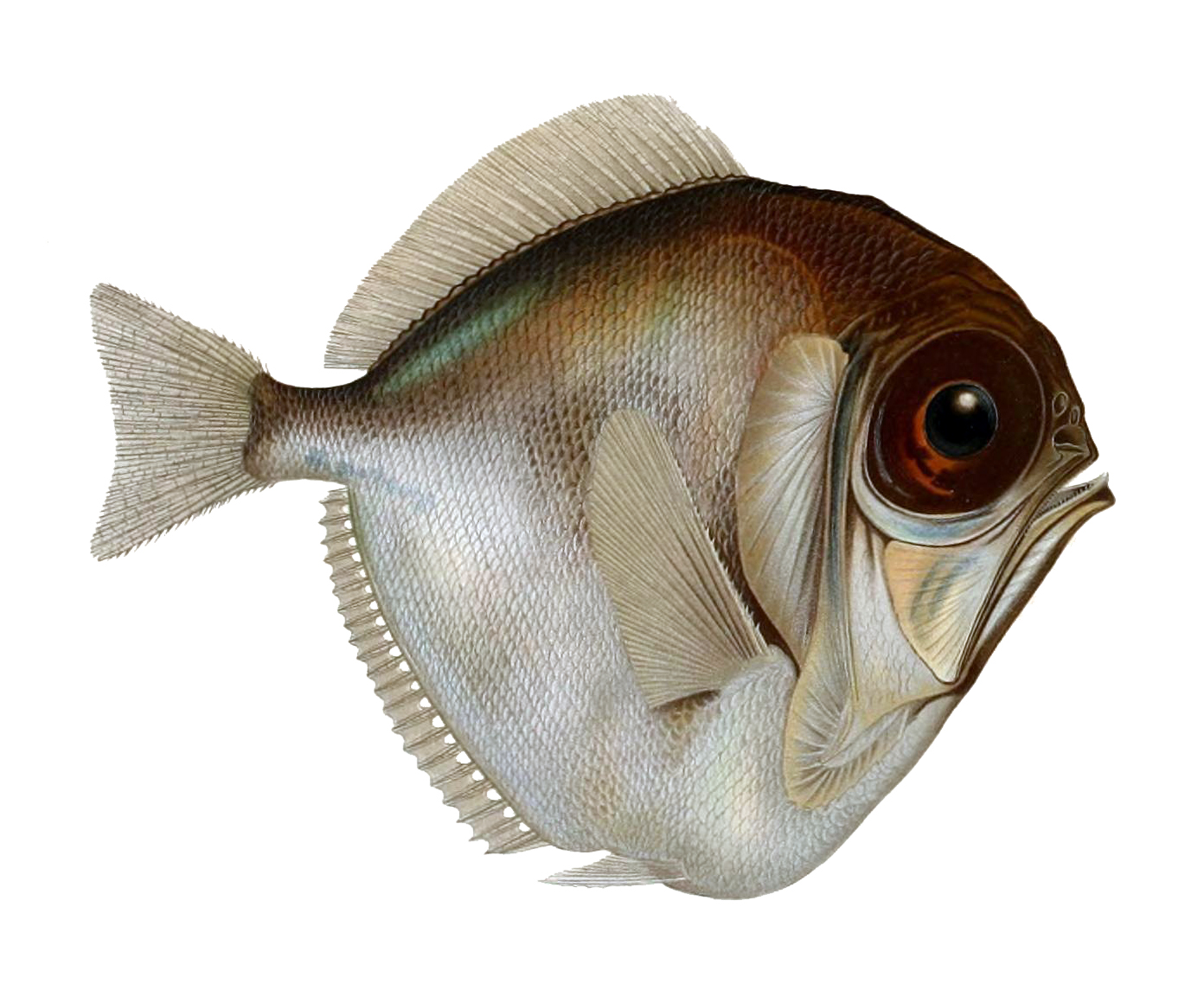
Silver spinyfin, Diretmus argenteus

Family Trachichthyidae (roughies and slimeheads)

- Orange roughy, Hoplostethus atlanticus
- Silver roughy, Hoplostethus mediterraneus mediterraneus

===== Clade Percomorpha =====
====== Order Ophidiiformes (cusk-eels, brotulas and relatives) ======
Family Aphyonidae

- Sciadonus galatheae

Family Bythitidae (viviparous brotulas)

- Cataetyx alleni
- Cataetyx laticeps
- Thalassobathia pelagica

Family Carapidae (pearlfishes)

- Pearlfish, Echiodon drummondii

Family Ophidiidae (cusk-eels)

- Pudgy cuskeel, Spectrunculus grandis

====== Order Gobiiformes (gobies and relatives) ======
Family Gobiidae (gobies)

- Transparent goby, Aphia minuta
- Jeffrey's goby, Buenia jeffreysii
- Crystal goby, Crystallogobius linearis
- Couch's goby, Gobius couchi
- Red-mouthed goby, Gobius cruentatus
- Black goby, Gobius niger
- Rock goby, Gobius paganellus
- Two-spotted goby, Gobiusculus flavescens
- Lesueurigobius friesii
- Lozano's goby, Pomatoschistus lozanoi
- Common goby, Pomatoschistus microps
- Sand goby, Pomatoschistus minutus
- Painted goby, Pomatoschistus pictus
- Leopard-spotted goby, Thorogobius ephippiatus

====== Order Syngnathiformes (pipefishes, seahorses, dragonettes and relatives) ======
Family Callionymidae (dragonettes)

- Common dragonet, Callionymus lyra
- Callionymus maculatus
- Reticulated dragonet, Callionymus reticulatus

Family Mullidae (goatfishes)

- Red mullet, Mullus barbatus barbatus
- Striped red mullet, Mullus surmuletus

Family Syngnathidae (seahorses and pipefishes)

- Snake pipefish, Entelurus aequoreus
- Long-snouted seahorse, Hippocampus guttulatus
- Worm pipefish, Nerophis lumbriciformis
- Straightnose pipefish, Nerophis ophidion
- Greater pipefish, Syngathus acus
- Nilsson's pipefish, Syngnathus rostellatus
- Broad-nosed pipefish, Syngnathus typhle

====== Order Scombriformes ======
Source:(tuna, mackerel and relatives; sensu Betancur-Rodriguez et al. 2016)

Family Bramidae (pomfrets)

- Atlantic pomfret, Brama brama
- Bigscale pomfret, Taractichthys longipinnis

Family Centrolophidae (medusafishes)

- Barrelfish, Hyperoglyphe perciformis
- Cornish blackfish, Schedophilus medusophagus

Family Gempylidae (snake mackerels)

- Black gemfish, Nesiarchus nasutus
- Oilfish, Ruvettus pretiosus

Family Nomeidae (driftfishes) Family Scombridae (tuna, mackerel and bonitos)

- Bullet tuna, Auxis rochei rochei
- Frigate tuna, Auxis thazard thazard
- Skipjack tuna, Katsuwonus pelamis
- Atlantic bonito, Sarda sarda
- Atlantic mackerel, Scomber scombrus
- Albacore, Thunnus alalunga
- Atlantic bluefin tuna, Thunnus thynnus

Family Trichiuridae (cutlassfishes and scabbardfishes)

- Black scabbardfish, Aphanopus carbo
- Silver scabbardfish, Lepidopus caudatus
- Largehead hairtail, Trichiurus lepturus

====== Order Istiophoriformes (billfishes) ======
Family Xiphiidae (swordfish)

- Swordfish, Xiphias gladius

====== Order Carangiformes (jacks and relatives) ======
Family Carangidae (jacks and relatives)

- Vadigo, Campogramma glaycos
- Derbio, Trachinotus ovatus
- Atlantic horse mackerel, Trachurus trachurus

====== Order Pleuronectiformes (flatfishes) ======
Family Pleuronectidae (righteye flounders)

- Torbay sole, Glyptocephalus cynoglossus
- American plaice, Hippoglossoides platessoides
- Atlantic halibut, Hippoglossus hippoglossus
- Dab, Limanda limanda
- Lemon sole, Microstomus kitt
- European flounder, Platichthys flesus
- European plaice, Pleuronectes platessa

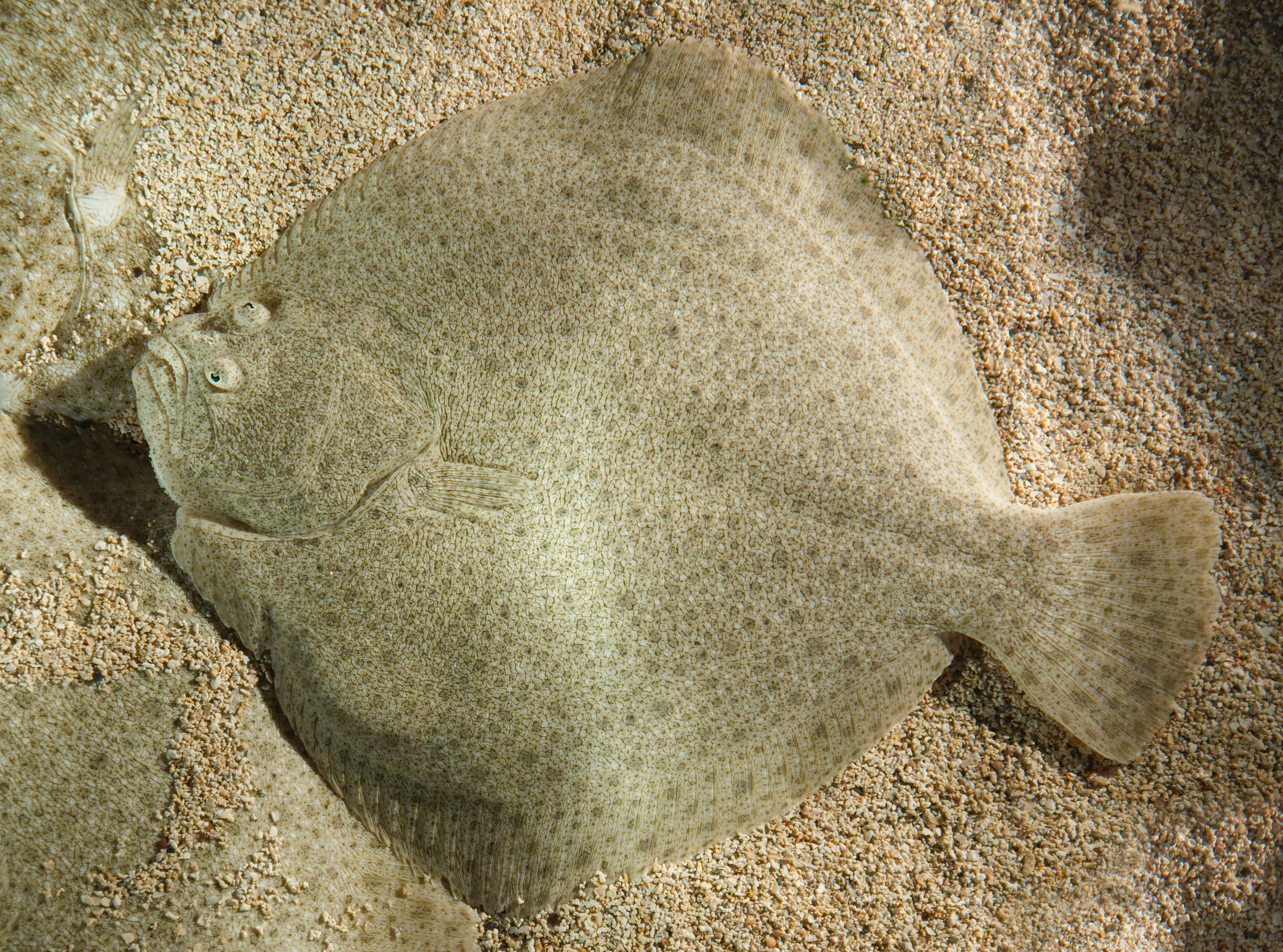
Turbot

- Greenland halibut, Reinhardtius hippoglossoides

Family Scophthalmidae (turbots)

- Fourspotted megrim, Lepidorhombus boscii
- Megrim, Lepidorhombus whiffiagonis
- Norwegian topknot, Phrynorhombus norvegicus
- Turbot, Scophthalmus maximus
- Brill, Scophthalmus rhombus
- Topknot, Zeugopterus punctatus
- Eckström's topknot, Zeugopterus regius

Family Soleidae (true soles)

- Solenette, Buglossidium luteum
- Thickback sole, Microchirus variegatus
- Common sole, Solea solea

====== Order Beloniformes ======
Family Belonidae (needlefishes)

- Garfish, Belone belone
- Short-beaked garfish, Belone svetovidovi

Family Scomberesocidae (sauries)

- Atlantic saury, Scomberesox saurus saurus

====== Order Atheriniformes (silversides) ======
Family Atherinidae (silversides)

- Sand smelt, Atherina presbyter

====== Order Mugiliformes (mullets) ======
Family Mugilidae (mullets)

- Golden grey mullet, Chelon aurata
- Thicklip grey mullet, Chelon labrosus
- Thin-lipped grey mullet, Chelon ramada

====== Order Gobiesociformes (clingfishes) ======
Family Gobiesocidae (clingfishes)

- Two-spotted clingfish, Diplecogaster bimaculata
- Connemarra clingfish, Lepadogaster candolii

====== Order Blenniiformes (blennies and relatives) ======
Family Blenniidae (combtooth blennies)

- Montagu's blenny, Coryphoblennius galerita
- Shanny, Lipophrys pholis
- Tompot blenny, Parablennius gattorugine

====== Order Uranoscopiformes ======
Source:(weevers, stargazers and relatives; sensu Betancur-Rodriguez et al. 2016)

Family Ammodytidae (sandlances)

- Raitt's sand eel, Ammodytes marinus
- Lesser sand eel, Ammodytes tobianus
- Smooth sandeel, Gymnammodytes semisquamatus
- Great sand eel, Hyperoplus immaculatus
- Great sandeel, Hyperoplus lanceolatus

Family Trachinidae (weeverfishes)

- Lesser weever, Echiichthys vipera
- Greater weever, Trachinus draco

Family Uranoscopidae (stargazers)

- Atlantic stargazer, Uranoscopus scaber

====== Order Labriformes ======
Source:(wrasses sensu Betancur-Rodriguez et al. 2016)

Family Labridae (wrasses)

- Rock cook, Centrolabrus exoletus
- Goldsinny wrasse, Ctenolabrus rupestris
- Ballan wrasse, Labrus bergylta
- Cuckoo wrasse, Labrus mixtus
- Baillon's wrasse, Symphodus bailloni
- Corkwing wrasse, Symphodus melops

====== Order Pempheriformes ======
Source:(sensu Betancur-Rodriguez et al. 2016)

Family Epigonidae (deepwater cardinalfishes)

- Bulls-eye, Epigonus telescopus

Family Polyprionidae (wreckfishes)

- Atlantic wreckfish, Polyprion americanus

====== Order Perciformes ======
Source:(sensu Betancur-Rodriguez et al. 2016)

====== Suborder Percoidei ======
Source: (sensu Betancur-Rodriguez et al. 2016)

Family Percidae (perches)

- European perch, Perca fluviatilis

====== Suborder Triglioidei (searobins and gurnards) ======
Family Triglidae (searobins and gurnards)

- Tub gurnard, Chelidonichthys lucerna
- Longfin gurnard, Chelidonichthys obscurus
- Grey gurnard, Eutrigla gurnardus

====== Suborder Scorpaenoidei (scorpionfish, rockfishes and relatives) ======
Family Sebastidae (rockfishes)

- Blackbelly rosefish, Helicolenus dactylopterus dactylopterus
- Norway redfish, Sebastes viviparus
- Spiny scorpionfish, Trachyscorpia cristulata echinata

====== Infraorder Zoarcales (eelpouts, wolffishes and relatives) ======
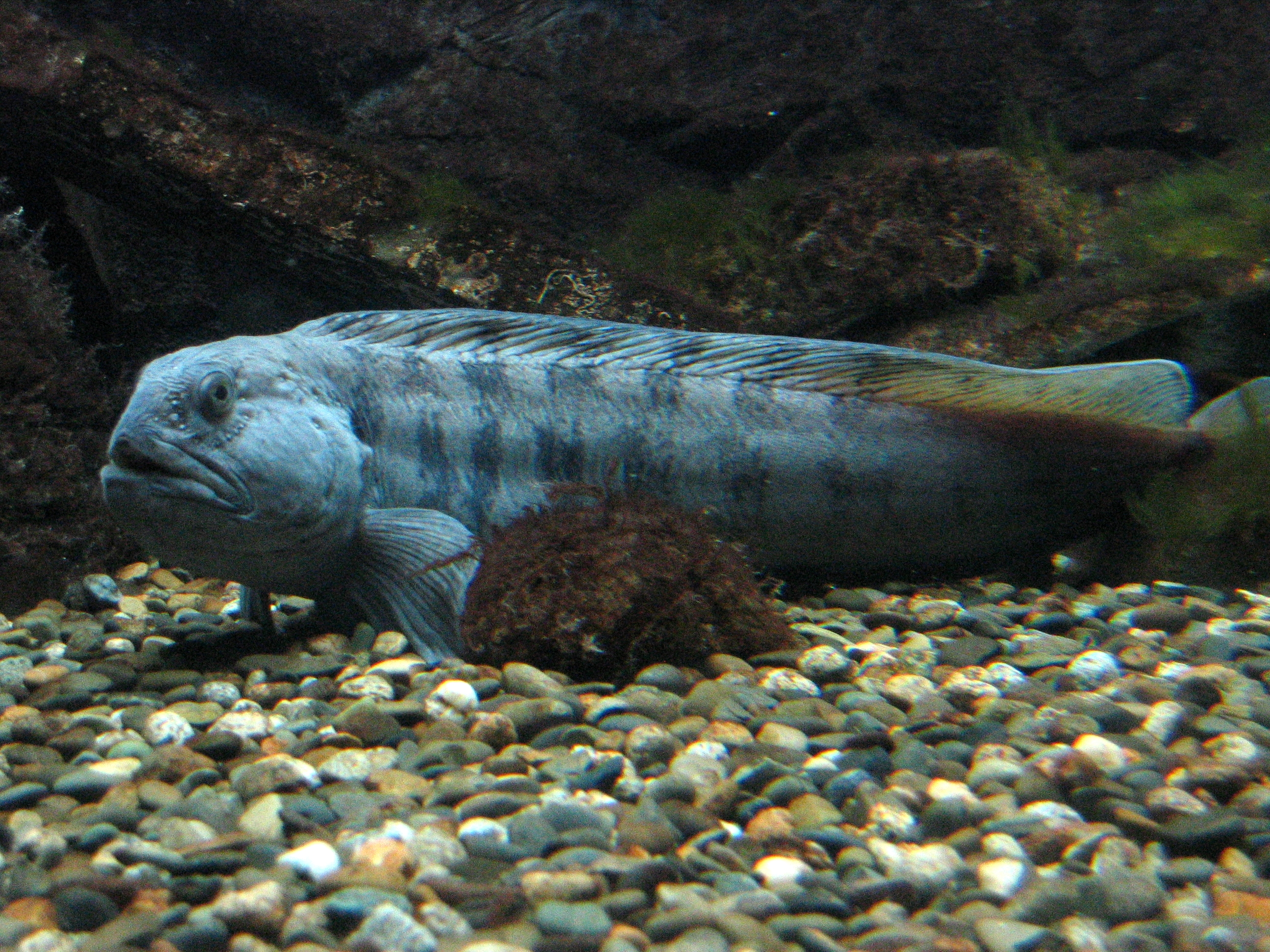
Atlantic wolf fish

Family Anarhichadidae (wolffishes)

- Atlantic wolffish, Anarhichas lupus

Family Pholidae (gunnels)

- Rock gunnel, Pholis gunnellus

Family Stichaeidae (pricklebacks)

- Yarrell's blenny, Chirolophis ascanii

Family Zoarcidae (eelpouts)

- White eelpout, Lycenchelys alba
- Atlantic eelpout, Lycodes terraenovae
- Snubnose eelpout, Pachycara bulbiceps
- Pachycara crassiceps
- Viviparous blenny, Zoarces viviparus

====== Infraorder Gasterosteales (sticklebacks, etc.) ======
Family Gasterosteidae (sticklebacks)

- Three-spined stickleback, Gasterosteus aculeatus aculeatus
- Nine-spined stickleback, Pungitius pungitius
- Sea stickleback, Spinachia spinachia

====== Infraorder Cottales (sculpins, snailfishes, lumpfishes and relatives) ======
Family Cottidae (sculpins)

- European bullhead, Cottus gobio
- Norway bullhead, Micrenophrys lilljeborgii
- Shorthorn sculpin, Myoxocephalus scorpius
- Longspined sea-scorpion, Taurulus bubalis

Family Cyclopteridae (lumpsuckers)

- Lumpsucker, Cyclopterus lumpus

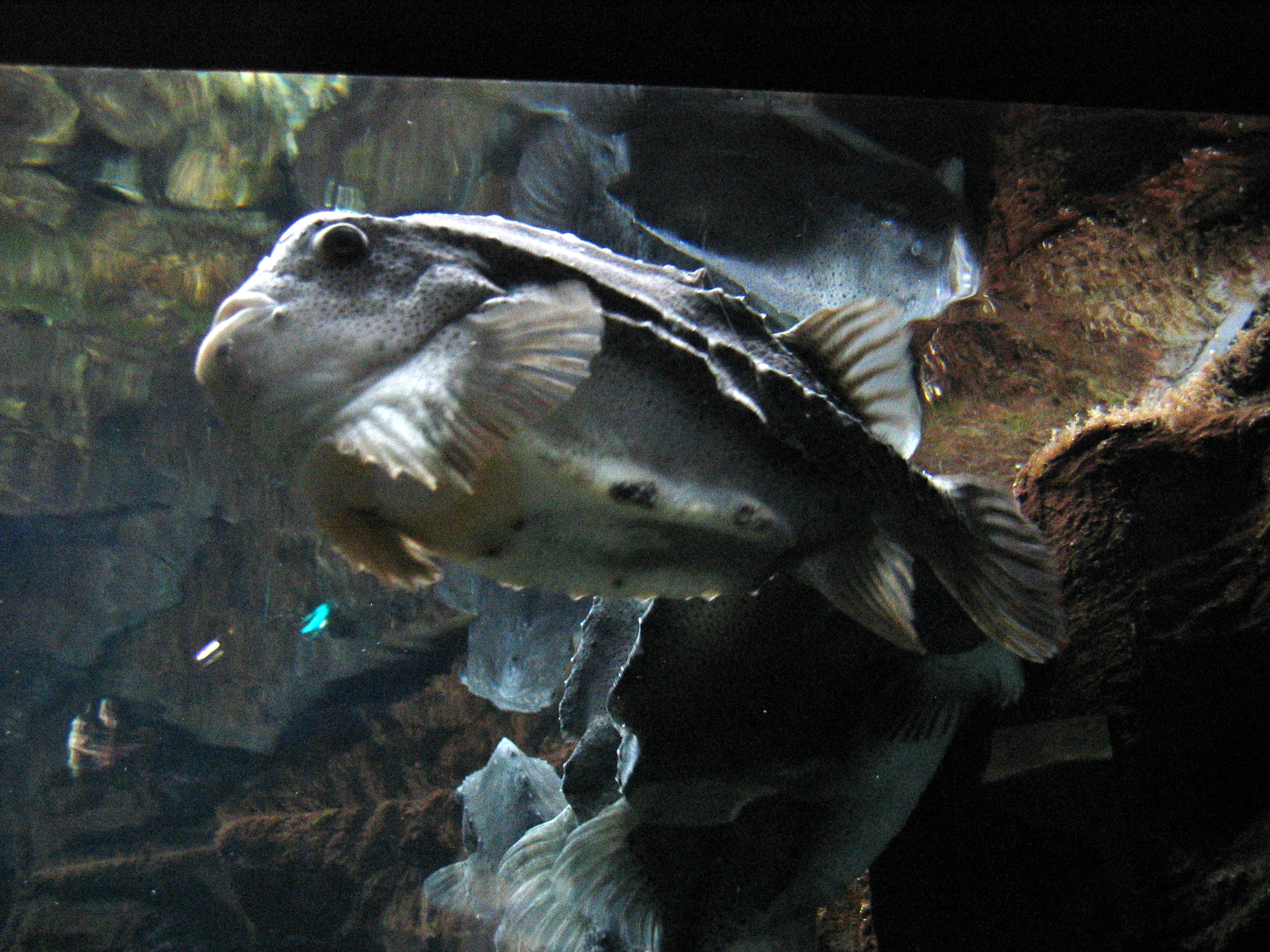
Lumpsucker, Cyclopterus lumpus

Family Liparidae (snailfishes)

- Careproctus aciculipunctatus
- Merret's snailfish, Careproctus merretti
- Common seasnail, Liparis liparis liparis
- Montagu's sea snail, Liparis montagui
- Paraliparis abyssorum
- Black seasnail, Paraliparis bathybius
- Paraliparis bipolaris
- Paraliparis hystrix

Family Psychrolutidae (fatheads and blobfishes)

- Pallid sculpin, Cottunculus thomsonii

====== Order Moroniformes ======
SourcesL(temperate basses sensu Betancur-Rodriguez et al. 2016)

Family Moronidae (temperate basses)

- European seabass, Dicentrarchus labrax

====== Order Spariformes ======
Source:(seabreams and relatives sensu Betancur-Rodriguez et al. 2016)

Family Sparidae (seabreams and progies)

- Bogue, Boops boops
- Common dentex, Dentex dentex
- Blackspot seabream, Pagellus bogaraveo
- Common pandora, Pagellus erythrinus
- Gilt-head bream, Sparus aurata
- Black seabream, Spondyliosoma cantharus

====== Order Priacanthiformes ======
Source:(bigeyes and bandfishes sensu Betancur-Rodriguez et al. 2016)

Family Cepolidae (bandfishes)

- Red bandfish, Cepola macrophthalma

====== Order Caproiformes ======
Source:(boarfishes sensu Betancur-Rodriguez et al. 2016)

Family Caproidae (boarfishes)

- Boarfish, Capros aper

====== Suborder Lophoidei (monkfishes) ======
Family Lophiidae (monkfishes)

- Black-bellied angler, Lophius budegassa
- Monkfish, Lophius piscatorius

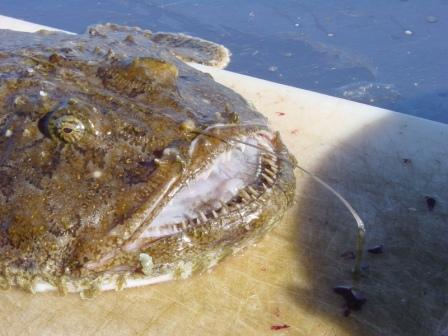
Monkfish

====== Suborder Ceratioidei ======
Family Oneirodidae (dreamers)

- Can-opener smoothdream, Chaenophryne longiceps
- Oneirodes carlsbergi
- Bulbous dreamer, Oneirodes eschrichtii

====== Order Tetraodontiformes (pufferfishes, triggerfishes, molas) ======
Family Molidae (molas)

- Ocean sunfish, Mola mola
- Slender sunfish, Ranzania laevis

Family Tetraodontidae (pufferfishes)

- Blunthead puffer, Sphoeroides pachygaster

== Freshwater fish ==
It has been argued that only nine species of freshwater fish are truly native to Ireland — five char species, pollan, eel, brown trout and Atlantic salmon — as Ireland's fresh water was entirely frozen during the last glacial period, only diadromous fish could repopulate Irish waters after the Ice Age. All other freshwater species were introduced, mostly from the Middle Ages onwards.

- Common bream, Abramis brama
- Allis shad, Alosa alosa
- Twaite shad, Alosa falax fallax
- European eel, Anguilla anguilla
- Irish pollan, Coregonus autumnalis
- European bullhead, Cottus gobio
- Northern pike, Esox lucius
- Three-spined stickleback, Gasterosteus aculeatus aculeatus
- Gudgeon, Gobio gobio
- European river lamprey, Lampetra fluviatilis
- European brook lamprey, Lampetra planeri
- Common dace, Leuciscus leuciscus
- Stone loach, Nemacheilus barbatulus
- European smelt, Osmerus eperlanus
- Sea lamprey, Petromyzon marinus
- Common minnow, Phoxinus phoxinus
- Nine-spined stickleback, Pungitius pungitius
- Common roach, Rutilus rutilus
- Atlantic salmon, Salmo salar
- Brown trout, Salmo trutta
- Arctic char, Salvelinus alpinus alpinus
- Cole's char, Salvelinus colii
- Coomsaharn char, Salvelinus fimbriatus
- Gray's char, Salvelinus grayi
- Blunt-snouted Irish char, Salvelinus obtusus
- Common rudd, Scardinius erythrophthalmus
- European chub, Squalius cephalus
- Norway bullhead, Taurulus lilljeborgi
- Tench, Tinca tinca

== See also ==
- List of fishes of Great Britain
