= Kaikōura Canyon =

Submarine canyon near New Zealand

Coordinates: 42.550°S 173.717°E

The Kaikōura Canyon is a geologically active submarine canyon located southwest of the Kaikōura Peninsula off the northeastern coast of the South Island of New Zealand. It is 60 kilometres (37 mi) long, and is generally U-shaped. The canyon descends into deep water and merges into an ocean channel system that can be traced for hundreds of kilometres across the deep ocean floor. At the head of the Kaikōura Canyon, the depth of water is around 30 metres (98 ft), but it drops rapidly to 600 metres (2,000 ft) and continues down to around 2,000 metres (6,600 ft) deep where it meets the Hikurangi Channel. Sperm whales can be seen close to the coast south of Goose Bay, because the deep water of the Kaikōura Canyon is only one kilometre (0.62 mi) off the shoreline in this area.

Studies of the Kaikōura Canyon have found that it is a highly productive ecosystem with 10 to 100 times the density of marine life found in other deep sea habitats.

Prior to the 2016 Kaikōura earthquake, studies had indicated the likelihood of a submarine landslide in the canyon, potentially producing a hazardous tsunami for the nearby Kaikōura coastline. Following the earthquake, it was found that a large submarine landslide had occurred. The abundant sealife in the canyon that had been identified in earlier studies had been severely affected by the landslide. An estimated 850 million tonnes of sediment had flowed into deeper water, and a turbidity current travelled more than 600 km (370 mi) along the Hikurangi Channel.

== Sediment transport ==
The Kaikōura Canyon is deeply incised into the narrow, tectonically active, continental margin and is the main sediment source of the 1,500 km (930 mi) long Hikurangi Channel, which supplies turbidites to the Hikurangi Trough, as well as to low parts of the oceanic Hikurangi Plateau, and to the edge of the southwest Pacific Basin. It is thought to be the sink for the coastal sediment transport system that carries large amounts of erosional debris northwards up the coast from the rivers draining the tectonically active mountains of the South Island.

== Ocean currents ==
The upper 200 m (660 ft) of the ocean off the New Zealand coast typically consists of warm, saline and nutrient-poor subtropical surface water in the north, and cold, less saline but more nutrient-rich subantarctic surface water in the south. A subantarctic ocean current of surface water flows around the southern part of the South Island of New Zealand and moves northward to the east of the South Island to turn east into the open Pacific Ocean above the depths of the Hikurangi Trough. This ocean current, which is called the Southland Current in New Zealand, meets the subtropical East Cape Current, coming from the north, off Kaikōura. The boundary between these two ocean currents is known as a subtropical front. Mixing of these currents leads to the formation of offshore eddies, and some turbulence reaching to the depths of the Hikurangi Trough and Kaikōura Canyon. The currents south of the Kaikōura Peninsula in particular form a complex flow structure, as warm water and cold water mix with the addition of inland water from the rivers. These currents, eddies and upwellings change seasonally between summer and winter and also in response to the topography of the seafloor and surface winds.

== Ecosystem productivity ==
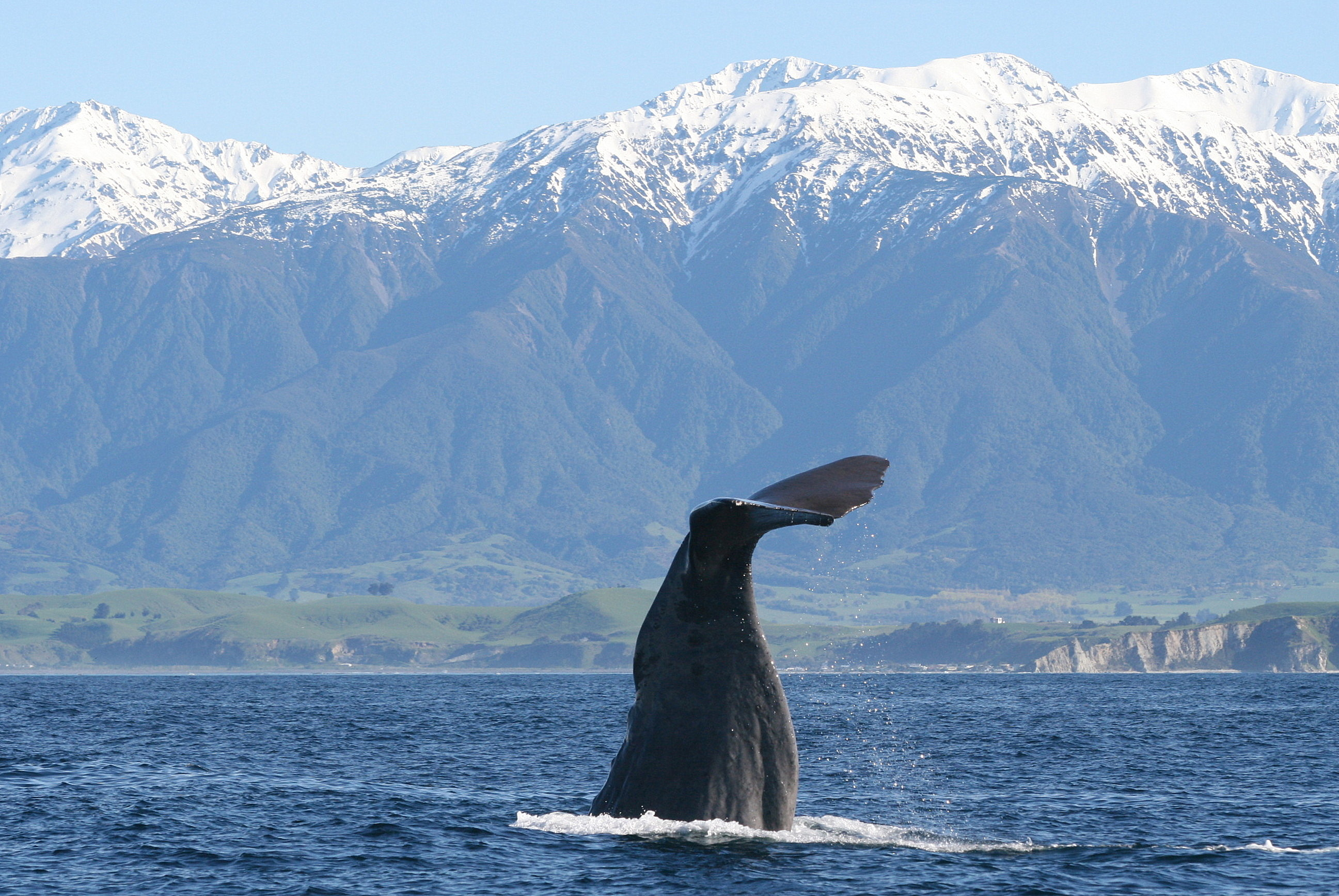
Diving sperm whale near Kaikōura

In 2006, scientists from the National Institute of Water and Atmospheric Research (NIWA) used the research vessel RV Tangaroa to explore the canyon over a period of three days. They found that the Kaikōura Canyon has an ecosystem that is 10 to 100 times more abundant than other comparable deep sea habitats. They found marine organisms such as sea cucumbers, heart urchins, bristle worms and spoon worms with a density of around 500 individuals per square metre on the canyon floor, ten times as many as previously found anywhere else. The biomass is estimated to be 100 times greater than reported in other deep sea locations. The abundance of fish in the canyon was estimated at around 5,000 fish per hectare, ten times as many as in the north Pacific.

Deep-sea fish recorded in the Kaikōura Canyon include the alert pigfish (Alertichthys blacki), banded rattail (Coelorinchus fasciatus), serrulate rattail (Coryphaenoides serrulatus), and abyssal rattail (C. murrayi), all captured by trawling at depths of 240–300 m. Violet cod (Antimora rostrata) have been recorded at much greater depths of 1,500–1,705 m.

== Hikurangi Marine Reserve ==
Hikurangi Marine Reserve was established off the Kaikōura coast in 2014, and includes part of the Kaikōura Canyon. The marine reserve covers an area of 10,416 hectares (25,740 acres) south of the township. The reserve is the largest and deepest marine reserve adjacent to any of New Zealand's three main islands. No fishing, harvesting or mining is allowed in the reserve.

== Submarine landslides in the canyon ==
=== Pre-2016 studies of landslide tsunami hazard ===
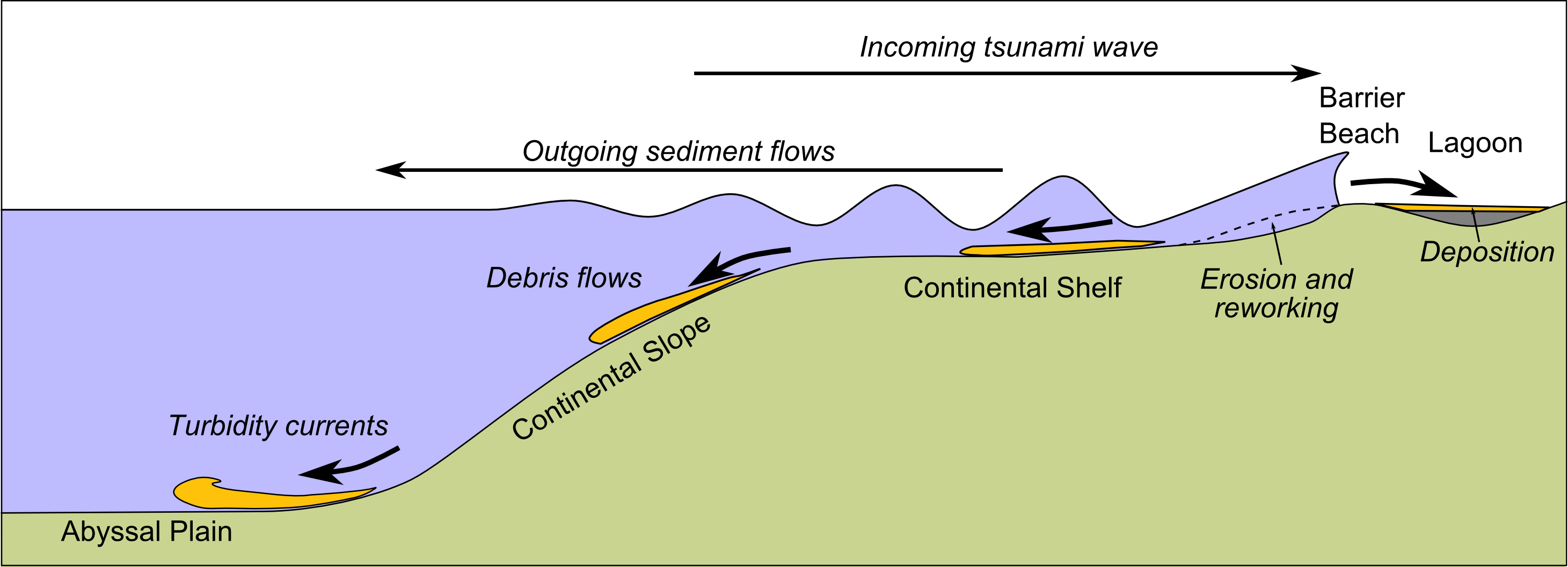
Generalised simulation of sediment transport processes and consequent tsunami events

Prior to 2016, there was a known risk of an earthquake-triggered tsunami resulting from the displacement of sediment accumulating at the mouth of the canyon. Sediment consisting of fine sand and silt is continually deposited at the head of the Kaikōura Canyon, and by 2006 it was estimated that a total volume of 0.24 cubic kilometres (0.058 cu mi) had accumulated. Studies identified that a near-field tsunami caused by the displacement of this sediment in a submarine landslide could pose a significant threat to the surrounding area, especially coastal infrastructure such as roads and houses.

Historical accounts of canyon-related tsunami in this region are uncertain. Geological evidence is also limited, and no palaeotsunami specific studies have been carried out to date. However, in archaeological literature, there are some possible indications of past marine inundation events. Marine sediments can be seen to overlie an historical Māori occupation site on Seddon's Ridge, near South Bay, adjacent to the Kaikōura peninsula. These deposits indicate that marine inundation occurred sometime within the last 150–200 years. Seddon's Ridge is an uplifted beach ridge, and has a long history of Māori settlement. An older village site dating from approximately 650 years before present, situated approximately 350 metres from the shoreline, contains reworked oven stones which are overlain by marine overwash deposits. Without accompanying reliable geological data, this kind of archaeological evidence is only circumstantial. However, it does indicate that the ocean has inundated past coastal settlements in the region, as a result of a severe storm surge or tsunami.

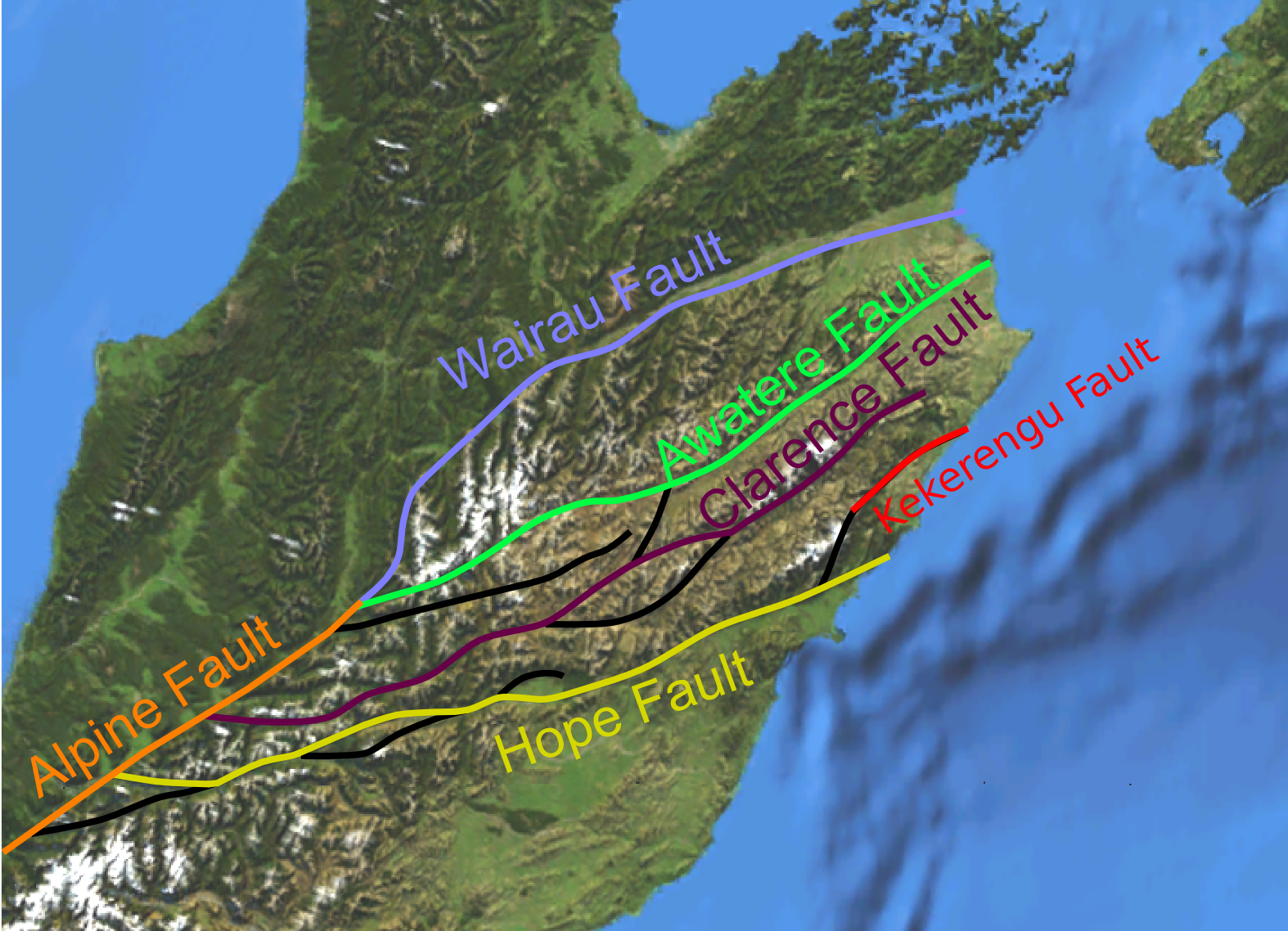
Marlborough Fault System

Rapidly accumulating sandy sediment on a steep slope in an active tectonic region is likely to be susceptible to failure during moderately large earthquakes. Strong ground shaking associated with rupture on nearby faults can be expected to reduce the shear strength of the sandy sediment deposit at the canyon head and may trigger mass failures. It was estimated that an earthquake magnitude 8 on the Richter magnitude scale or shaking equivalent to V (Moderate) on the Mercalli intensity scale would be enough to trigger such an event. The Kaikōura region is adjacent to the Marlborough fault zone. There are a number of faults in this area predicted to have the capacity to produce such an event. The most likely are the Hope Fault, previously New Zealand's most active fault, and the larger Alpine Fault. The lesser-known Hundalee Fault also terminates near the Kaikōura coast, and although it is not as large as other faults in the area, it still has the potential to trigger a submarine landslide event. The return period for major magnitude 8 or intensity V earthquakes at Kaikōura has been estimated to be in the order of 150 years based on what is known about the return time of earthquake events for regional faults in the Kaikōura area.

There is evidence of past failures in similar deposits in the Kaikōura Canyon, in the presence of numerous sand and gravel turbidite deposits in cores taken from the canyon axis. Ground acceleration with a peak of 0.44 g is estimated at the Kaikōura township for a return period of 150 years. Prior to 2016, there had been no large seismic events centred close to Kaikōura since written records of the area began in about 1840 AD, but lichen-dating of rock-falls suggests that there may have been a major earthquake in the vicinity 175 years ago. This correlates with the estimated amount of time it would have taken to accumulate the sediment deposits seen at the canyon head in the 2006 studies. Therefore, the conclusion can be drawn that sediment in the canyon head gully had failed previously, and flowed down the canyon as a major turbidity current released by this earthquake.

A landslide-generated tsunami represents a large potential hazard to the area from South Bay to Oaro. An extreme event has been modelled, incorporating failure of the entire landslide mass identified by Lewis & Barnes. These simulations indicate the potential for large tsunami runup heights along this section of coast. The effects could be more severe here if such an event coincided with storm activity or high tides.

It is estimated to take approximately a century to accumulate enough sediment in the canyon head to generate a major mass failure. Therefore, as at 2006, there was already enough sediment to pose a significant hazard. Evidence of tensional cracks at the head of the modern deposit indicate that it was likely to fail as a result of shaking associated with a major earthquake. Failure would result in the collapse of an estimated quarter of a cubic kilometre of unconsolidated sediment. The canyon-head gully of the Kaikōura Canyon faces northwards, obliquely towards the shore. Consequently, the initial motion of a debris avalanche in the gully, and the resulting tsunami, is towards the shore of South Bay and the southern side of the Kaikōura Peninsula.

=== Effects of the 2016 Kaikōura earthquake ===
In November 2016, the Kaikōura earthquake caused submarine mudslides and sediment flows that devastated the deep-sea life in the canyon. An estimated 850 million tonnes of sediment was displaced into deep ocean, and a turbidity current travelled more than 600 km along the Hikurangi Channel.

In September 2017, a NIWA expedition found that marine life in the canyon was recovering faster than expected, and observed high densities of sea cucumbers and urchins in some areas.

In 2019, results of tsunami modelling studies were reported, seeking to explain the 7-metre (23 ft) runup that was observed locally in Kaikōura following the earthquake. The modelling indicated that when combined with the direct effects of the large earthquake, a submarine landslide with a volume of 4.5–5.2 km^{3} (1.1–1.2 cu mi), occurring 10 to 20 minutes after the main earthquake rupture would be consistent with the observed 7-metre runup.

== See also ==
- Physical oceanography
- Turbidite
