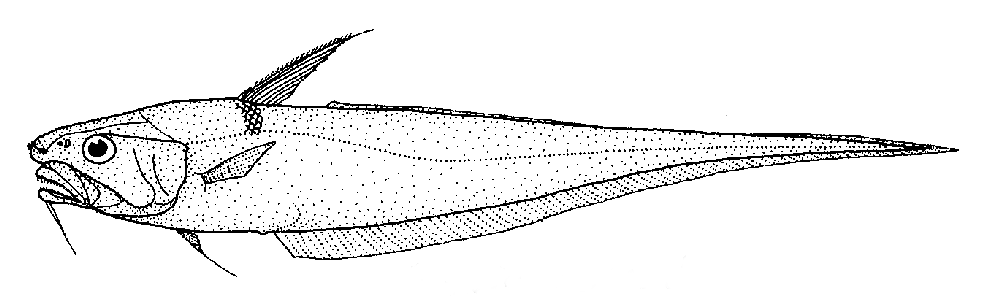
- Drawing by Dr Tony Ayling

Conservation status
- Least Concern (IUCN 3.1)

Scientific classification
- Kingdom: Animalia
- Phylum: Chordata
- Class: Actinopterygii
- Order: Gadiformes
- Suborder: Macrouroidei
- Family: Macrouridae
- Genus: Coryphaenoides
- Species: C. rudis

Binomial name
- Coryphaenoides rudis Günther, 1878

Synonyms
- Macrourus paradoxus Smith & Radcliffe, 1912; Coryphaenoides paradoxus (Smith & Radcliffe, 1912); Nematonurus macrocephalus Maul, 1951; Coryphaenoides macrocephalus (Maul, 1951)

= Rudis rattail =

Species of fish

The rudis rattail, Coryphaenoides rudis, is a fish of the family Macrouridae, found around the world in tropical and subtropical oceans, at depths between 600 and 2,300 m. Its length is between 30 and 40 cm, although FishBase gives lengths of up to 1.1 m.
