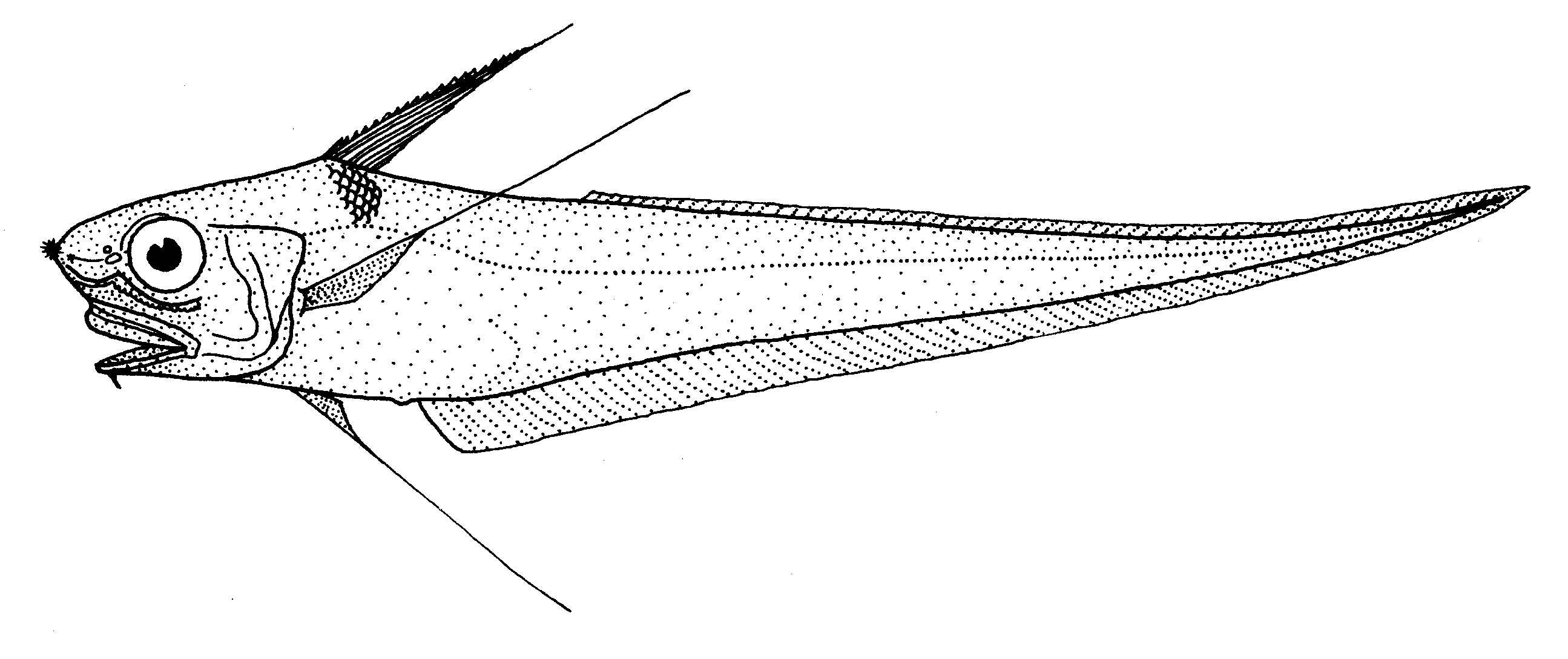
- Drawing by Dr Tony Ayling

Conservation status
- Least Concern (IUCN 3.1)

Scientific classification
- Kingdom: Animalia
- Phylum: Chordata
- Class: Actinopterygii
- Order: Gadiformes
- Family: Macrouridae
- Genus: Coryphaenoides
- Species: C. subserrulatus

Binomial name
- Coryphaenoides subserrulatus Makushok, 1976

= Longrayed whiptail =

Species of fish

The long-rayed whiptail or four-rayed rattail, Coryphaenoides subserrulatus, is a rattail of the genus Coryphaenoides, found circumpolar in all southern oceans, at depths between 550 and 1,200 m. Its length is between 20 and 37 cm.
