= Coryphaenoides woodmasoni =

Scientific classification
- Domain: Eukaryota
- Kingdom: Animalia
- Phylum: Chordata
- Class: Actinopterygii
- Order: Gadiformes
- Family: Macrouridae
- Genus: Coryphaenoides
- Species: C. woodmasoni

Binomial name
- Coryphaenoides woodmasoni (Alcock, 1890)

Synonyms
- Macrourus woodmasoni Alcock, 1890; Macrurus woodmasoni Alcock, 1890

Species of fish

Coryphaenoides woodmasoni is a fish species belonging to the family Macrouridae and the order Gadiformes. The species was described by Alfred William Alcock in 1873 and named in honour of James Wood-Mason. There are no subspecies listed in the Catalogue of Life.

== Morphology ==
The males can reach a length of 53 cm.

== Habitat ==
The species is a deep-water fish that lives in depths from 1,240 to 1,829 meters (4,068 to 6,001 ft).

== Geographic distribution ==
The range of C. woodmasoni is the Indian Ocean off the northern part of the Indian subcontinent, as well as the Mascarene Ridge and the Ninety East Ridge.

== Sources ==
- Fenner, Robert M.: The Conscientious Marine Aquarist. Neptune City, New Jersey: T.F.H. Publications, 2001.
- Helfman, G., B. Collette and D. Facey: The diversity of fishes. Blackwell Science, Malden, Massachusetts, 1997.
- Hoese, D.F. 1986. M.M. Smith and P.C. Heemstra (eds.) Smiths' sea fishes. Springer-Verlag, Berlin.
- Maugé, L.A. 1986. A J. Daget, J.-P. Gosse and D.F.E. Thys van den Audenaerde (eds.) Check-list of the freshwater fishes of Africa (CLOFFA). ISNB Brussels; MRAC, Tervuren, Belgium; and ORSTOM, París. Vol. 2.
- Moyle, P. and J. Cech.: Fishes: An Introduction to Ichthyology, 4th edition, Upper Saddle River, New Jersey: Prentice-Hall. 2000.
- Nelson, J.: Fishes of the World, 3rd edition. New York: John Wiley and Sons. 1994.
- Wheeler, A.: The World Encyclopedia of Fishes, 2nd edition, London: Macdonald. 1985.
