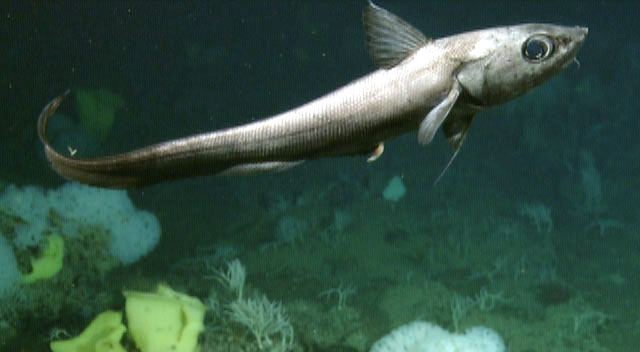
- Coryphaenoides acrolepis
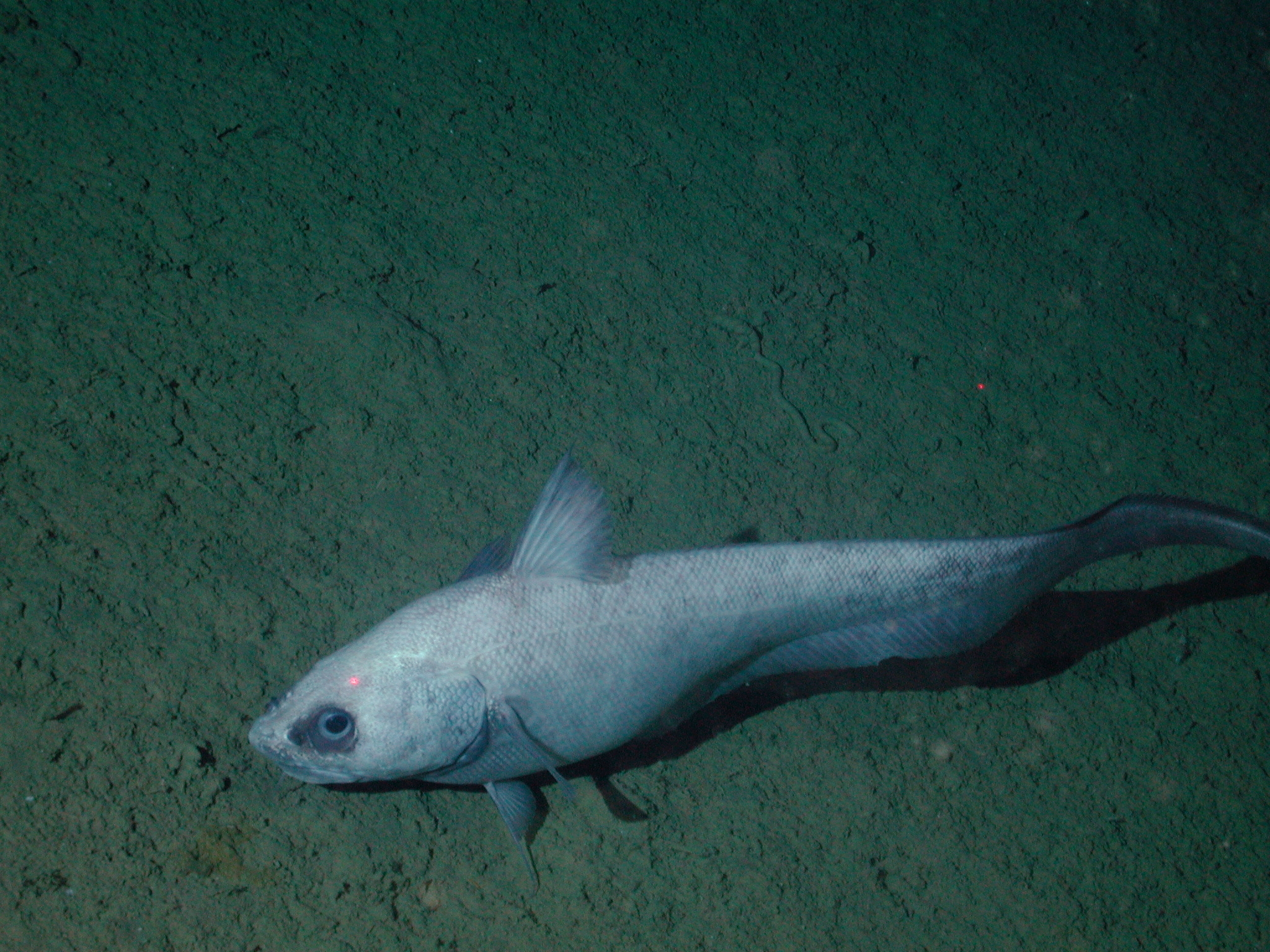
- Coryphaenoides leptolepis

Scientific classification
- Kingdom: Animalia
- Phylum: Chordata
- Class: Actinopterygii
- Division: Teleostei
- Order: Gadiformes
- Suborder: Macrouroidei
- Family: Macrouridae
- Genus: Coryphaenoides; Gunnerus, 1765

Type species
- Coryphaenoides rupestris Gunnerus, 1765

Synonyms
- Bogoslovius Jordan & Evermann, 1898; Cariburus Parr, 1946; Chalinura Goode & Bean, 1883; Dolloa Jordan, 1900; Hemimacrurus Fraser-Brunner, 1935; Lionurus Günther, 1887; Moseleya Goode & Bean, 1896; Nematonurus Günther, 1887

= Coryphaenoides =

Coryphaenoides Temporal range: 33.9–0 Ma Early Oligocene to present

Genus of fishes

Coryphaenoides is a genus of rattails which is found in all oceans of the world. They are found in deep waters and C. yaquinae, recorded to 7,012 m (23,005 ft), is the only member in the family known from the hadal zone.

The generic name means "similar to Coryphaena".

== Species ==
Coryphaenoides armatus is seen in this video describing the operation and use of an autonomous lander (RV Kaharoa) in deep sea research.

There are currently 66 recognized species in this genus:

- Coryphaenoides acrolepis (T. H. Bean, 1884) (Pacific grenadier)
- Coryphaenoides affinis Günther, 1878
- Coryphaenoides alateralis N. B. Marshall & Iwamoto, 1973
- Coryphaenoides altipennis Günther, 1877
- Coryphaenoides anguliceps (Garman, 1899) (Loose-scale grenadier)
- Coryphaenoides ariommus C. H. Gilbert & W. F. Thompson, 1916 (Humboldt grenadier)
- Coryphaenoides armatus (J. Hector, 1875) (Abyssal grenadier)
- Coryphaenoides asper Günther, 1877
- Coryphaenoides asprellus (H. M. Smith & Radcliffe, 1912)
- Coryphaenoides boops (Garman, 1899) (Short-snout grenadier)
- Coryphaenoides brevibarbis (Goode & T. H. Bean, 1896) (Short-beard grenadier)
- Coryphaenoides bucephalus (Garman, 1899) (Narrow-snout grenadier)
- Coryphaenoides bulbiceps (Garman, 1899) (Large-eye grenadier)
- Coryphaenoides camurus (H. M. Smith & Radcliffe, 1912)
- Coryphaenoides capito (Garman, 1899) (Big-head grenadier)
- Coryphaenoides carapinus Goode & T. H. Bean, 1883 (Carapine grenadier)
- Coryphaenoides carminifer (Garman, 1899) (Carmine grenadier)
- Coryphaenoides castaneus Shcherbachev & Iwamoto, 1995
- Coryphaenoides cinereus (C. H. Gilbert, 1896) (Pop-eye grenadier)
- Coryphaenoides delsolari Chirichigno F. & Iwamoto, 1977 (Trident grenadier)
- Coryphaenoides dossenus P. J. McMillan, 1999 (Humpback whiptail)
- Coryphaenoides dubius (H. M. Smith & Radcliffe, 1912)
- Coryphaenoides fernandezianus (Günther, 1887) (Fernandez whiptail)
- Coryphaenoides ferrieri (Regan, 1913)
- Coryphaenoides filamentosus Okamura, 1970
- Coryphaenoides filicauda Günther, 1878 (Grenadier)
- Coryphaenoides filifer (C. H. Gilbert, 1896) (Filamented rattail)
- Coryphaenoides grahami Iwamoto & Shcherbachev, 1991 (Graham's whiptail)
- Coryphaenoides guentheri (Vaillant, 1888) (Günther's grenadier)
- Coryphaenoides gypsochilus Iwamoto & J. E. McCosker, 2001
- Coryphaenoides hextii (Alcock, 1890)
- Coryphaenoides hoskynii (Alcock, 1890)
- Coryphaenoides lecointei (Dollo, 1900)
- Coryphaenoides leptolepis Günther, 1877 (Ghostly grenadier)
- Coryphaenoides liocephalus (Günther, 1887) (Bearded rattail)
- Coryphaenoides longicirrhus (C. H. Gilbert, 1905)
- Coryphaenoides longifilis Günther, 1877 (Long-fin grenadier)
- Coryphaenoides macrolophus (Alcock, 1889)
- Coryphaenoides marginatus Steindachner & Döderlein (de), 1887 (Amami grenadier)
- Coryphaenoides marshalli Iwamoto, 1970
- Coryphaenoides mcmillani Iwamoto & Shcherbachev, 1991 (McMillan's whiptail)
- Coryphaenoides mediterraneus (Giglioli, 1893) (Mediterranean grenadier)
- Coryphaenoides mexicanus (A. E. Parr, 1946) (Mexican grenadier)
- Coryphaenoides microps (H. M. Smith & Radcliffe, 1912)
- Coryphaenoides microstomus P. J. McMillan, 1999
- Coryphaenoides murrayi Günther, 1878 (Abyssal rattail)
- Coryphaenoides myersi Iwamoto & Sazonov, 1988 (Myers' grenadier)
- Coryphaenoides nasutus Günther, 1877 (Large-nose grenadier)
- Coryphaenoides oreinos Iwamoto & Sazonov, 1988
- Coryphaenoides orthogrammus (H. M. Smith & Radcliffe, 1912)
- Coryphaenoides paramarshalli Merrett, 1983
- Coryphaenoides profundicolus (Nybelin, 1957) (Deep-water grenadier)
- Coryphaenoides rudis Günther, 1878 (Rudis rattail)
- Coryphaenoides rupestris Gunnerus, 1765 (Round-nose grenadier)
- Coryphaenoides semiscaber C. H. Gilbert & C. L. Hubbs, 1920
- Coryphaenoides serrulatus Günther, 1878 (Serrulate whiptail)
- Coryphaenoides sibogae M. C. W. Weber & de Beaufort, 1929
- Coryphaenoides soyoae Nakayama & Endo, 2016 (Black grenadier)
- Coryphaenoides spinulosus (C. H. Gilbert & Burke, 1912)
- Coryphaenoides striaturus Barnard, 1925 (Striate whiptail)
- Coryphaenoides subserrulatus Makushok, 1976 (Long-rayed whiptail)
- Coryphaenoides thelestomus Maul, 1951 (Rough-lip grenadier)
- Coryphaenoides tydemani (M. C. W. Weber, 1913)
- Coryphaenoides woodmasoni (Alcock, 1890)
- Coryphaenoides yaquinae Iwamoto & Stein, 1974
- Coryphaenoides zaniophorus (Vaillant, 1888) (Thick-beard grenadier)

The following fossil taxa are known:

- †Coryphaenoides karaginensis Gretshina, 1973 (Late Oligocene of Kamchatka, Russia)
- †Coryphaenoides richi Schwarzhans, Moritz & Goedert, 2026 (Early Oligocene of Washington, US)
