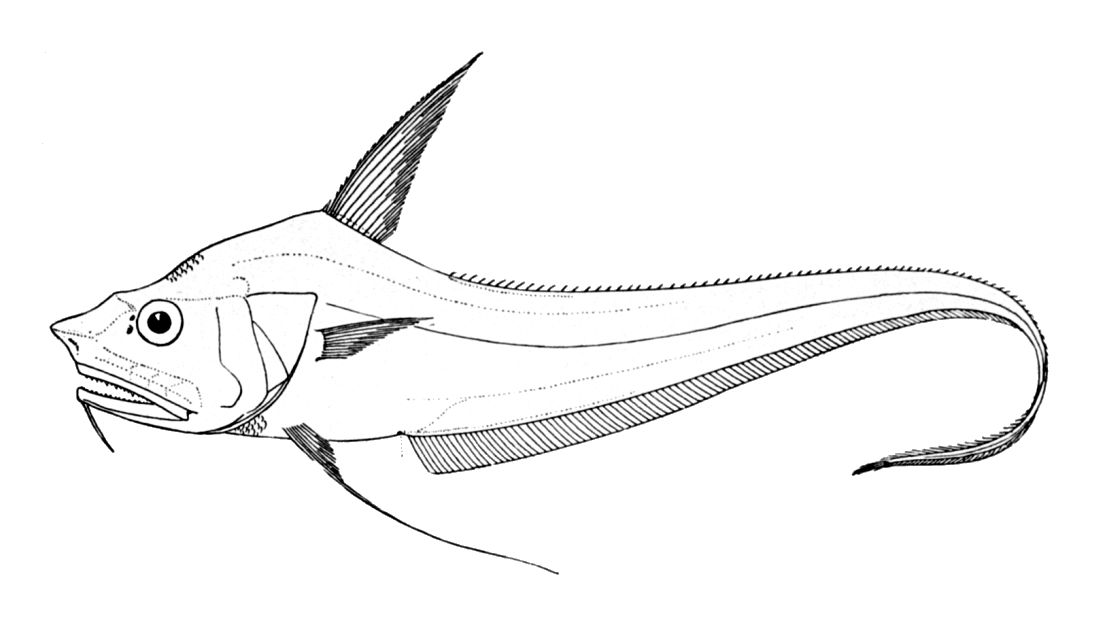

Conservation status
- Least Concern (IUCN 3.1)

Scientific classification
- Kingdom: Animalia
- Phylum: Chordata
- Class: Actinopterygii
- Order: Gadiformes
- Family: Macrouridae
- Genus: Coryphaenoides
- Species: C. mediterraneus

Binomial name
- Coryphaenoides mediterraneus (Giglioli, 1893)

Synonyms
- Chalinura mediterranea Giglioli, 1893; Chalinura murrayi europaea Nybelin, 1948; Coryphaenoides (Chalinura) mediterraneus Giglioli, 1893

= Mediterranean grenadier =

Species of fish

The Mediterranean grenadier (Coryphaenoides mediterraneus) is a species of deep-sea fish in the family Macrouridae.

== Description ==
The Mediterranean grenadier has a measurement of up to 73 cm (29 in). The head is scaled except for its gular and branchiostegal membranes; it has a blunt snout. Its brain shows increased volume in the octavolateral area (premotor organization of body movements) and gustatory area (taste); this is unsurprising as it lives in near-total darkness and is dependent on chemosensory inputs to find prey.

== Habitat ==
The Mediterranean grenadier lives in the North Atlantic Ocean, Mediterranean Sea and Gulf of Mexico; it is bathydemersal, living at depths of 1,000–4,262 m (3,281–13,983 ft). During 2008–2011 baited cameras were deployed over a depth range of 532–5111 m in the Ionian Sea to characterize the large mobile fauna. At depths greater than 3000 m, including Calypso Deep, the deepest point in the Mediterranean, the Mediterranean grenadier was observed, the only one fish species found, extending this species' maximum recorded depth to 5111 m.

== Behaviour ==
The Mediterranean grenadier feeds on small benthic invertebrates. They exhibit a cycle of daily activity, because the solar cycle influences the movement of pelagic prey who move vertically during the day. They are parasitised by many species of cestode worms.
