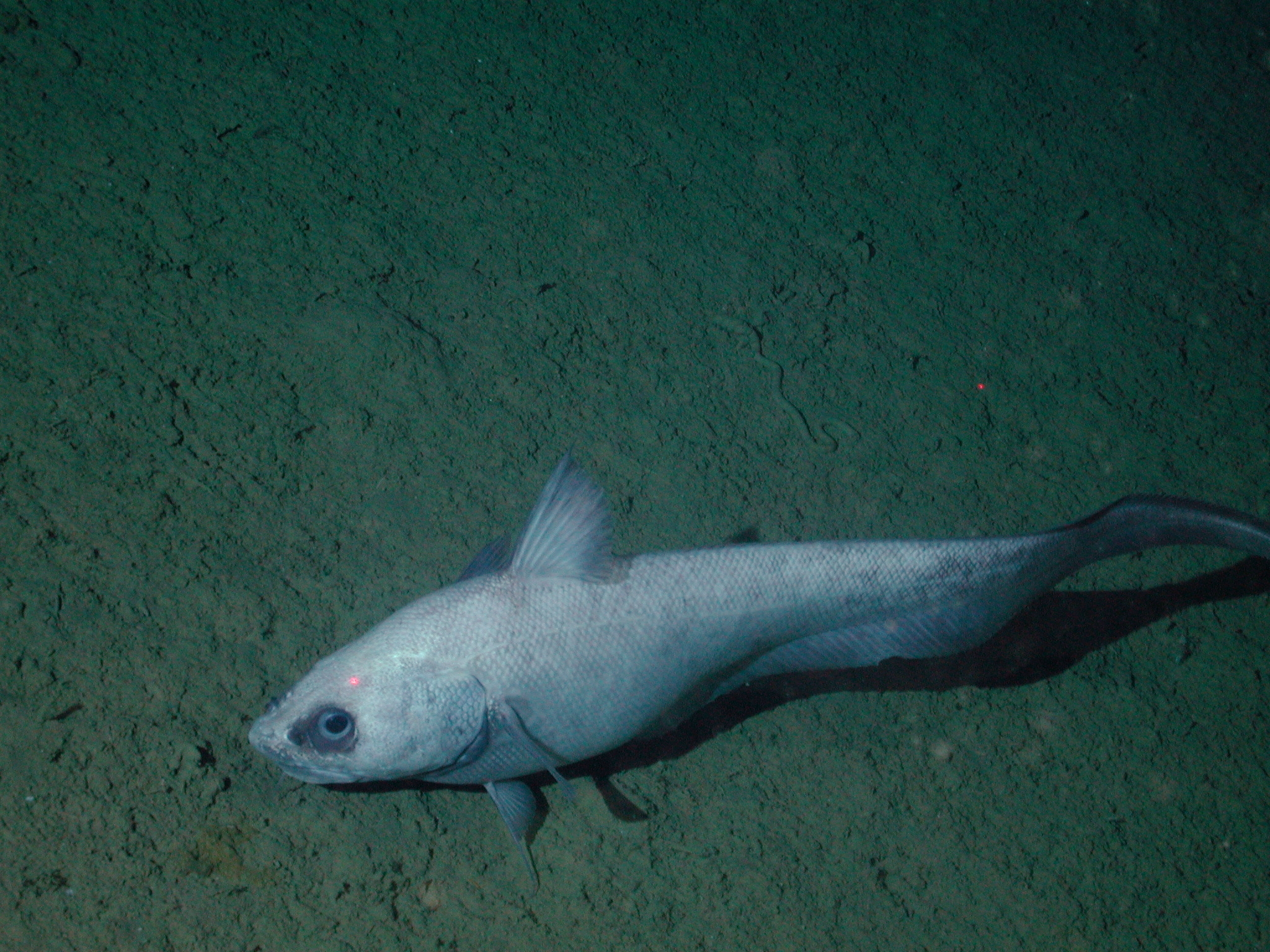

Conservation status
- Least Concern (IUCN 3.1)

Scientific classification
- Domain: Eukaryota
- Kingdom: Animalia
- Phylum: Chordata
- Class: Actinopterygii
- Order: Gadiformes
- Family: Macrouridae
- Subfamily: Macrourinae
- Genus: Coryphaenoides
- Species: C. leptolepis

Binomial name
- Coryphaenoides leptolepis Günther, 1877

Synonyms
- Chalinura leptolepis (Günther, 1877); Chalinura simula Goode & Bean, 1883; Coryphaenoides simulus (Goode & Bean, 1883); Macrurus simulus (Goode & Bean, 1883); Chalinura serrula Bean, 1890; Coryphaenoides serrula (Bean, 1890)

= Coryphaenoides leptolepis =

Species of fish

Coryphaenoides leptolepis, the ghostly grenadier, is a species of rattail found in the northern Atlantic and Pacific Oceans at depths of 610 to 4,000 metres (2,000 to 13,120 ft). This species grows to a length of 62 centimetres (24 in) TL.
