= Coomsaharn char =

Conservation status
- Vulnerable (IUCN 3.1)

Scientific classification
- Kingdom: Animalia
- Phylum: Chordata
- Class: Actinopterygii
- Division: Teleostei
- Order: Salmoniformes
- Family: Salmonidae
- Genus: Salvelinus
- Species: S. fimbriatus

Binomial name
- Salvelinus fimbriatus Regan, 1908

Species of fish

Coordinates: 51.992106°N 9.996643°W

The Coomsaharn char (Salvelinus fimbriatus; the spellings Coomasaharn and charr are also used; Irish: ruabhreac Chom Sathairn) is a species of lacustrine char fish in the family Salmonidae.

It is only located in Lough Coomsaharn, County Kerry, Ireland.

Location of Lough Coomsaharn in Ireland

== Taxonomy ==
=== Name ===
The English word "char[r]" is thought to derive from Old Irish ceara/cera meaning "[blood] red", referring to its pink-red underside. This would also connect with its Welsh name torgoch, "red belly".

It is believed that Lough Coomsaharn (/ˌkuːməˈsæhərən/) may derive its name from the Irish Com Sathairn, "hollow of Saturday(?)" in reference to the mass rock on the lakes northern flank. However, it has been argued that the name derives from Ancient Irish meaning "lost in time", this is backed by the rock art found nearby which provides a glimpse of early human settlement in the area (circa 4000-5000 years ago).

== Biology ==
Salvelinus fimbriatus spawns in November/December and feeds on zooplankton. It is distinguished from other Salvelinus in Ireland by large eyes, having 27–30 gill rakers, with 16–20 on the lower part (hence the species name fimbriatus, "fringed"). Also, its body depth is 20–25% of snout length, the snout is conical, and the lower jaw is not included in the upper one; an adaptation that helps it to feed on plankton.

== History ==
The Coomsaharn char are a remnant fish of the Last Ice Age.
