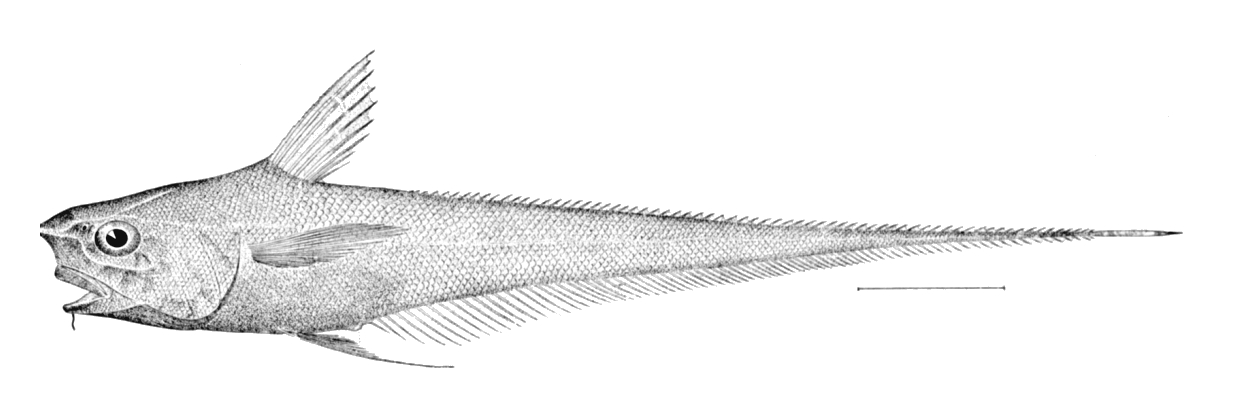

Conservation status
- Least Concern (IUCN 3.1) (Europe assessment)

Scientific classification
- Kingdom: Animalia
- Phylum: Chordata
- Class: Actinopterygii
- Order: Gadiformes
- Family: Macrouridae
- Genus: Coryphaenoides
- Species: C. carapinus

Binomial name
- Coryphaenoides carapinus (Goode & T. H. Bean, 1883)

Synonyms
- Coryphaenoides carapinus Goode & Bean, 1883; Chalinura carapina Goode & Bean, 1883; Chaulinura carapina Goode & Bean, 1883; Coryphaenoides (Lionurus) carapinus Goode & Bean, 1883; Lionurus carapinus Goode & Bean, 1883; Macrurus carapinus Goode & Bean, 1883; Nematonurus ferrani Goode & Bean, 1883; Coryphaenoides carapinus Fraser-Brunner, 1935

= Carapine grenadier =

Species of fish

The carapine grenadier (Coryphaenoides carapinus) is a species of deep-sea fish in the family Macrouridae.

Its name (pronounced /ˈkærəpaɪn/) refers to its resemblance to the Carapus pearlfishes.

== Description ==
The carapine grenadier is pale grey with a peppering of melanophores. It is up to 45 cm (18 in) in length. It has a narrow band of pointed teeth in the premaxillae.

== Habitat ==
The carapine grenadier lives in the Atlantic Ocean and Indian Ocean; it is bathypelagic, living at depths of 384–5,610 m (1,260–18,406 ft).

== Behaviour ==
The carapine grenadier feeds on polychaete worms, copepods, amphipods, isopods and mysids.
