= Coryphaenoides brevibarbis =

Conservation status
- Least Concern (IUCN 3.1)

Scientific classification
- Kingdom: Animalia
- Phylum: Chordata
- Class: Actinopterygii
- Order: Gadiformes
- Family: Macrouridae
- Genus: Coryphaenoides
- Species: C. brevibarbis

Binomial name
- Coryphaenoides brevibarbis (Goode & T. H. Bean, 1896)

Synonyms
- Chalinura brevibarbis Goode & Bean, 1896; Coryphaenoides (Chalinura) brevibarbis Goode & Bean, 1896

Species of fish

Coryphaenoides brevibarbis, also called the shortbeard grenadier, is a species of deep-sea fish in the family Macrouridae.

== Description ==
Coryphaenoides brevibarbis is pale brown in colour, with the lips, lining of gill cavities and peritoneum black. It is up to 35 cm (14 in) in length. Its premaxillary teeth are in a narrow/broad band, while the lower jaw has one row of teeth. Its snout is low and blunt, barely protruding, hence the name brevibarbis ("short beard").

== Habitat ==
Coryphaenoides brevibarbis lives in the North Atlantic Ocean; it is bathypelagic, living at depths of 430–4,700 m (1,410–15,420 ft).

== Behaviour ==
Coryphaenoides brevibarbis feeds on crustaceans, mysids and worms, using olfaction and its lateral line to find prey. Lifespan is about 14–15 years. Cyclocotyloides bergstadi and Chondracanthodes deflexus are parasites living in its gills. Many nematode parasites are also found in it.
