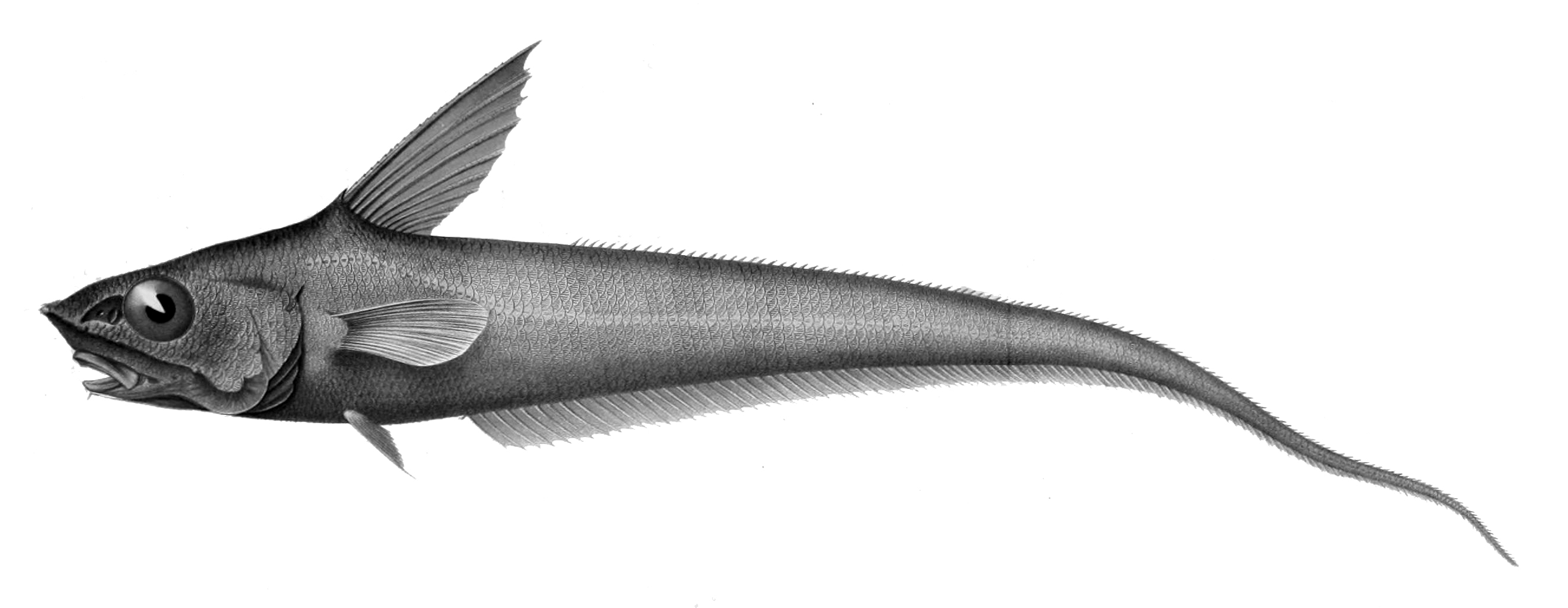

Conservation status
- Least Concern (IUCN 3.1)

Scientific classification
- Kingdom: Animalia
- Phylum: Chordata
- Class: Actinopterygii
- Order: Gadiformes
- Family: Macrouridae
- Genus: Coryphaenoides
- Species: C. guentheri

Binomial name
- Coryphaenoides guentheri (Vaillant, 1888)

Synonyms
- Chalinura guentheri Vaillant, 1888; Coryphaenoides (Coryphaenoides) guentheri Vaillant, 1888; Coryphaenoides ingolfi Vaillant, 1888; Macruroplus guentheri Vaillant, 1888; Macrurus guentheri Vaillant, 1888; Macrurus ingolfi Lütken, 1888

= Günther's grenadier =

Species of fish

Günther's grenadier (Coryphaenoides guentheri) is a species of deep-sea fish in the family Macrouridae.

The fish is named in honor of ichthyologist-herpetologist Albert Günther (1830–1914) of the British Museum (Natural History).

== Description ==
Günther's grenadier has a measurement of up to 50 cm (20 in). The head is compressed, with large eyes; the body is generally brownish, with the mouth and gill cavity darker.

== Habitat ==
Günther's grenadier lives in the Atlantic Ocean; it is bathydemersal, living at depths of 831–2,830 m (2,726–9,285 ft).

== Behaviour ==
Günther's grenadier feeds on small benthic invertebrates.
