= Deepwater grenadier =

Conservation status
- Least Concern (IUCN 3.1)

Scientific classification
- Kingdom: Animalia
- Phylum: Chordata
- Class: Actinopterygii
- Order: Gadiformes
- Family: Macrouridae
- Genus: Coryphaenoides
- Species: C. profundicolus

Binomial name
- Coryphaenoides profundicolus (Nybelin, 1893)

Synonyms
- Chalinura profundicola Nybelin, 1957; Coryphaenoides (Chalinura) profundicolus Nybelin, 1957

Species of fish

The deepwater grenadier (Coryphaenoides profundicolus) is a species of deep-sea fish in the family Macrouridae.

== Description ==
The deepwater grenadier is very large for its genus, measuring up to 129 cm (4.23 ft) and 14 kg (31 lb). Olfaction and taste are important senses for finding prey, which is unsurprising as it lives in the near-total darkness of the deep sea. It has a swim bladder, showing that it is a mobile forager.

== Habitat ==
The deepwater grenadier lives in the Atlantic Ocean, off the Bay of Biscay and Canary Islands, and in the Great Australian Bight; it lives at depths of up to 4,872 m (15,984 ft). The specific name is from Latin profundus ("deep") and the suffix -colus ("inhabitant"); -colus, -colum is not considered to be correct Latin but is still used in several species names. Otolith studies have shown that the deepwater grenadier lives at a variety of temperatures during its life.

== Behaviour ==
It is parasitised by Lepidapedon zubchenkoi and Steringophorus thulini, both trematode worms of the order Plagiorchiida.
