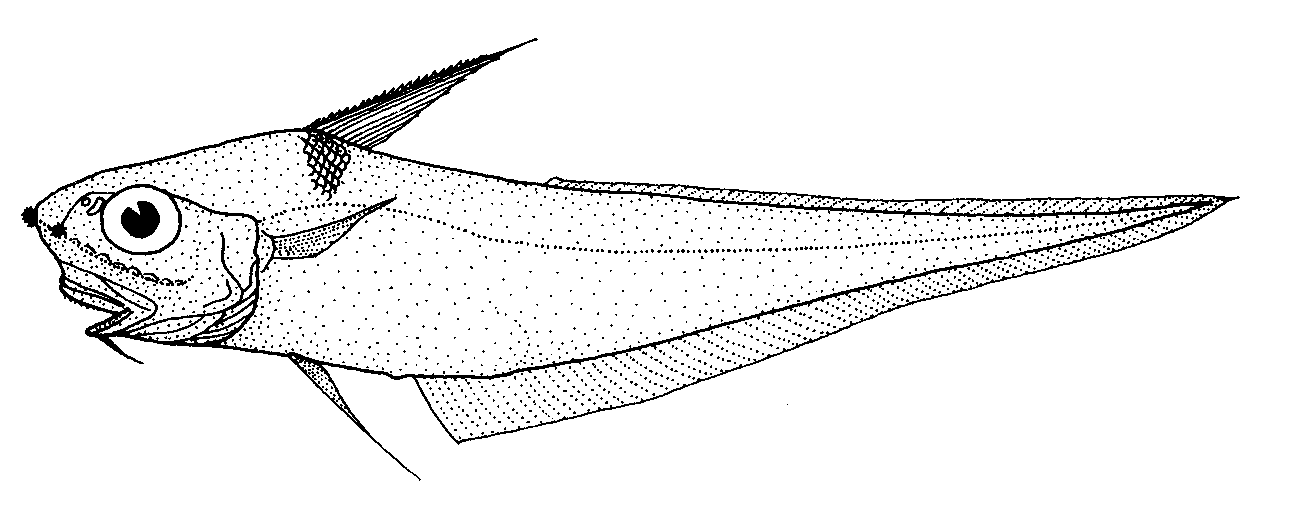
- Drawing by Dr Tony Ayling

Scientific classification
- Domain: Eukaryota
- Kingdom: Animalia
- Phylum: Chordata
- Class: Actinopterygii
- Order: Gadiformes
- Family: Macrouridae
- Subfamily: Macrourinae
- Genus: Coryphaenoides
- Species: C. serrulatus

Binomial name
- Coryphaenoides serrulatus Günther, 1878

Synonyms
- Macrurus serrulatus (Günther, 1878)

= Serrulate whiptail =

Species of fish

The serrulate whiptail or serrulate rattail, Coryphaenoides serrulatus, is a rattail of the genus Coryphaenoides, found around southern Australia and New Zealand, at depths of between 750 and 2,000 m. Its length is between 30 and 45 cm.
