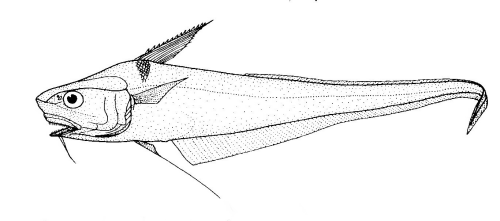
- Drawing by Dr Tony Ayling

Scientific classification
- Domain: Eukaryota
- Kingdom: Animalia
- Phylum: Chordata
- Class: Actinopterygii
- Order: Gadiformes
- Family: Macrouridae
- Subfamily: Macrourinae
- Genus: Coryphaenoides
- Species: C. murrayi

Binomial name
- Coryphaenoides murrayi Günther, 1878

= Abyssal rattail =

Species of fish

The abyssal rattail, Coryphaenoides murrayi, is a species of rattail found around southern Australia, Fiji, and the east coast of New Zealand at depths of between 1,196 to 2,350 metres (3,924 to 7,710 ft). Its reaches a length of 37 centimetres (15 in) TL.
