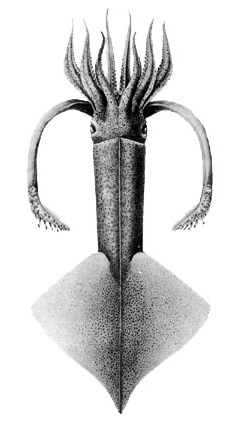
- Onychoteuthis banksii

Scientific classification
- Kingdom: Animalia
- Phylum: Mollusca
- Class: Cephalopoda
- Order: Oegopsida
- Family: Onychoteuthidae
- Genus: Onychoteuthis; Lichtenstein, 1818

Type species
- Onychoteuthis bergii Lichtenstein, 1818

Species
- See text

Synonyms
- Chaunoteuthis Appellöf, 1891; Teleonychoteuthis Pfeffer, 1900

= Onychoteuthis =

Genus of squids

Onychoteuthis is a genus of squid in the family Onychoteuthidae. The type species is Onychoteuthis bergii. While the genus is found worldwide in tropical and subtropical oceans, they can also occur in the North Pacific Ocean. There were previously considered to be four species in the genus but there are now considered to be roughly 10. These squid are frequently observed in the surface waters at night and they are often caught using dipnet at nightlight stations. The young squid are usually the only specimens captured using standard midwater trawls, the older squid are apparently able to avoid the trawls. They can, however be collected from the air as individuals are able to leap high out of the water, sometimes even landing on the deck of a ship.

== Anatomy ==
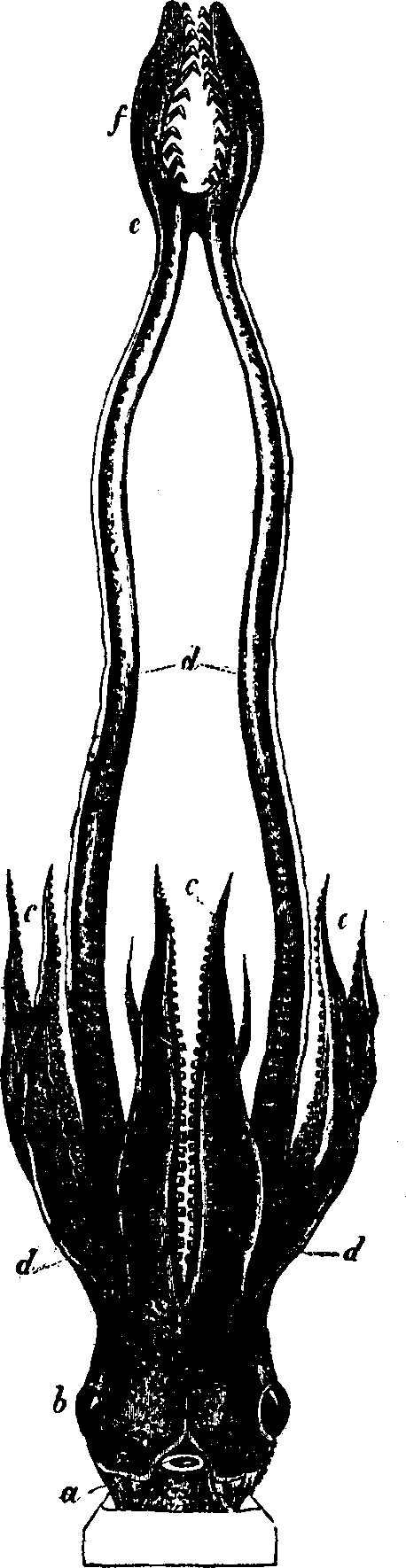
Head and circum-oral processes of the fore-foot. a, Neck. b, Eye. c, The eight short arms. d, Long prehensile tentacles, the clavate extremities of which are provided with suckers at e, and with a double row of hooks beyond at f.

Most species belonging to the genus have a mantle length of under 200 mm, however the larger members may measure over 300 mm. The species in this genus have a densely muscular, cylindrical mantle which is tapered posteriorly into a pointed tail. Their skin is smooth and has no warts or wrinkles. The gladius can be seen through the skin along the midline of the back. The fins are rhomboid in shape, heart shape or arrow shaped and are pointed posteriorly. The species of Onychoteuthis have 8-10 prominent nuchal folds. Their tentacular clubs have 2 central series of 19-27 large, strong hooks on their manus and the adults either have no lateral sucker series no marginal series of suckers. or they are vestigial. The chitinous rings of the suckers on the arms is smooth, with no teeth. They have photophores in their mantle cavity with a small one placed anteriorly on the ink sac, another near the anus; a large one placed posteriorly on the intestine and a bilobed photophore located on the ventral surface of each eye.

== Species ==
The following species are included in the genus:

- Onychoteuthis aequimanus Gabb, 1868
- Onychoteuthis banksii (Leach, 1817), common clubhook squid
- Onychoteuthis bergii Lichtenstein, 1818
- Onychoteuthis borealijaponica Okada, 1927, boreal clubhook squid
- Onychoteuthis compacta (Berry, 1913)
- Onychoteuthis horstkottei Bolstad, 2010
- Onychoteuthis lacrima Bolstad & Seki, 2008
- Onychoteuthis meridiopacifica Rancurel & Okutani, 1990
- Onychoteuthis mollis (Appellöf, 1891)
- Onychoteuthis prolata Bolstad, Vecchione & Young, 2008

There are also two species which are considered taxa inquirendum and up to 11 which are classed as nomen dubia.
