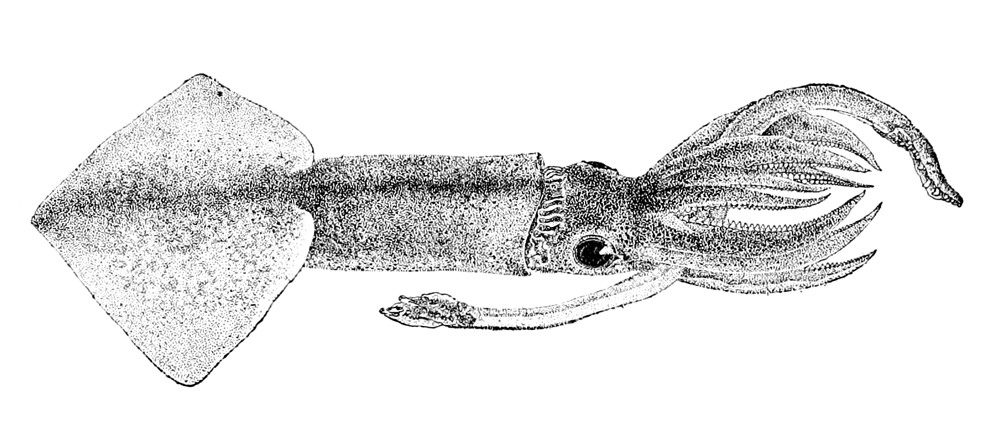
- Onychoteuthis banksii

Scientific classification
- Kingdom: Animalia
- Phylum: Mollusca
- Class: Cephalopoda
- Order: Oegopsida
- Family: Onychoteuthidae; Gray, 1849

Type genus
- Onychoteuthis Lichtenstein, 1818

Genera
- Ancistroteuthis; Onychoteuthis; Onykia; Filippovia; Moroteuthopsis; Notonykia; Walvisteuthis

Synonyms
- Walvisteuthidae Nesis & Nikitina, 1986

= Hooked squid =

Hooked squid Temporal range: Pliocene - recent

Family of squids

The hooked squid, family Onychoteuthidae, currently comprise about 20–25 species (several known from only single life stages and thus unconfirmed), in six or seven genera. They range in mature mantle length from 7 cm (2.8 in) to a suggested length of 2 m (6 ft 7 in) for the largest member, Onykia robusta. The family is characterised by the presence of hooks only on the tentacular clubs, a simple, straight, funnel–mantle locking apparatus, and a 'step' inside the jaw angle of the lower beak. With the exception of the Arctic Ocean, the family is found worldwide.

== Species ==
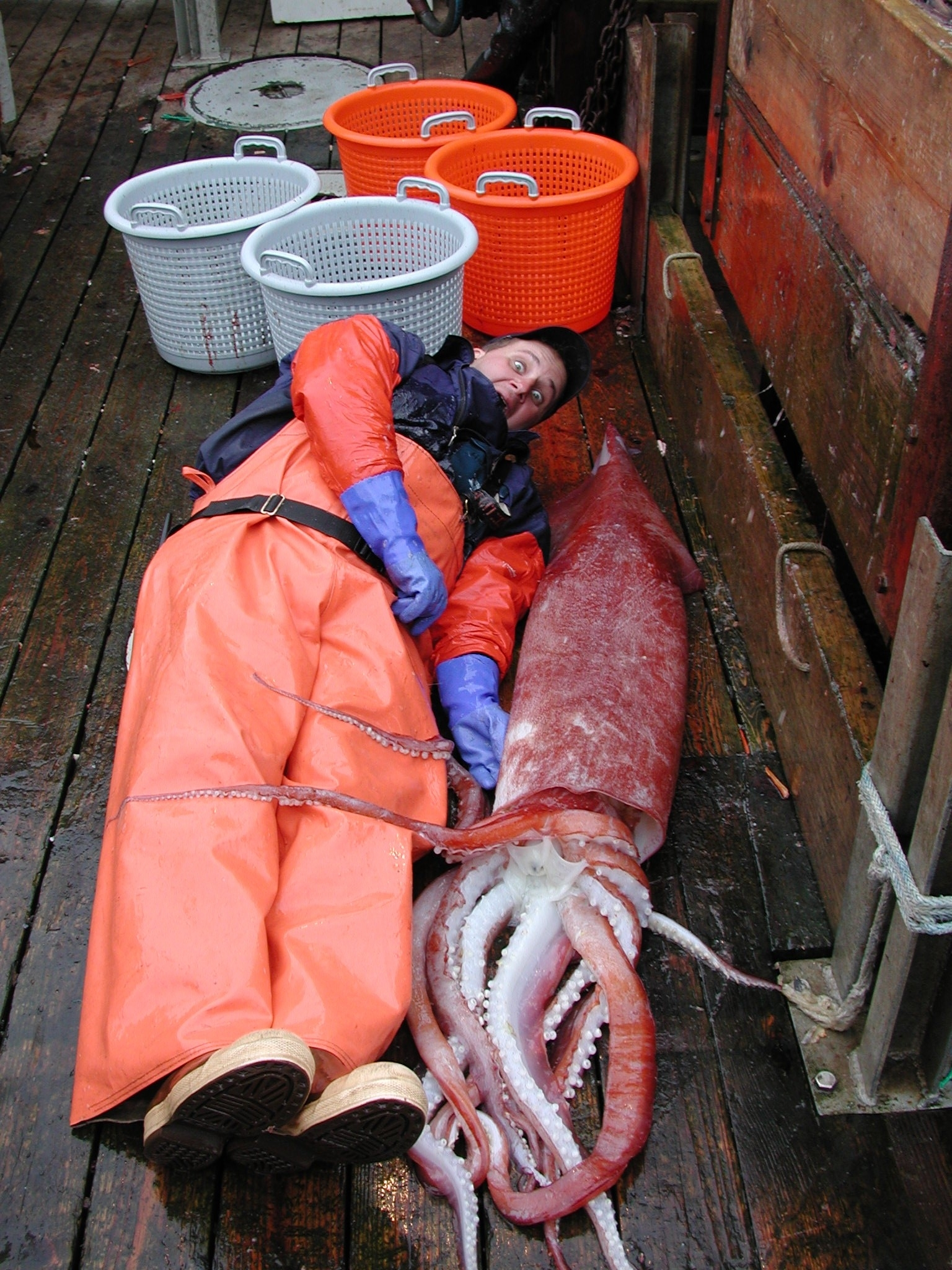
Reaching a mantle length of 2 m, Onykia robusta is the largest onychoteuthid and one of the largest of all squid.

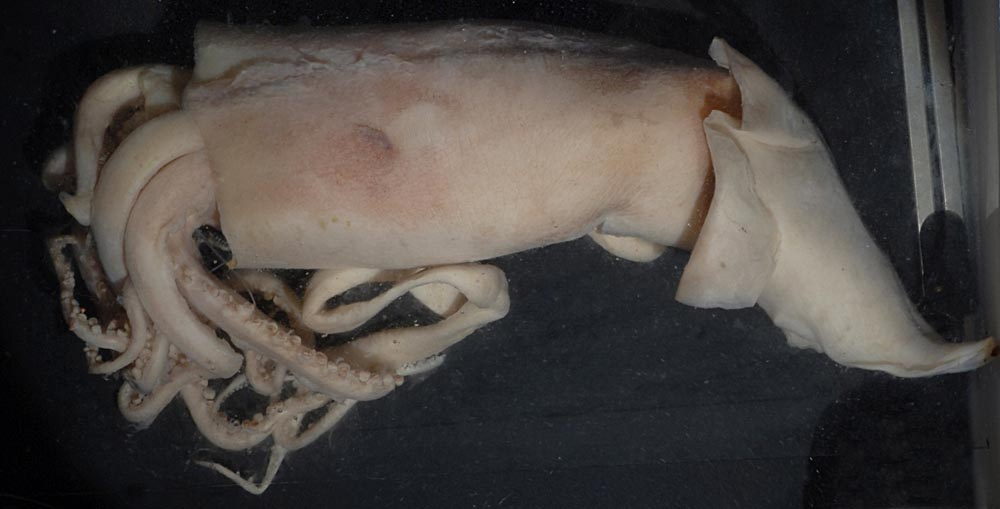
A nearly mature female of the undescribed species Onykia sp. A (27.2 cm ML), taken from the stomach of a swordfish

- Genus Onychoteuthis Lichtenstein, 1818
  - Onychoteuthis banksii (Leach, 1817) – common clubhook squid
  - Onychoteuthis bergii* Lichtenstein, 1818
  - Onychoteuthis mollis* Appelloef, 1891
  - Onychoteuthis compacta Berry, 1913
  - Onychoteuthis borealijaponica Okada, 1927 – boreal clubhook squid
  - Onychoteuthis meridiopacifica Rancurel & Okutani, 1990
  - Onychoteuthis lacrima Bolstad & Seki in Bolstad, 2008
  - Onychoteuthis prolata Bolstad, Vecchione & Young in Bolstad, 2008
  - Onychoteuthis horstkottei Bolstad, 2010
- Genus Onykia Lesueur, 1821 (includes most species previously placed in Moroteuthis)
  - Subgenus Onykia
    - Onykia carriboea Lesueur, 1821 – tropical clubhook squid
    - Onykia robusta (Verrill, 1876) – robust clubhook squid
    - Onykia loennbergii (Ishikawa & Wakiya, 1914) – Japanese hooked squid
    - Onykia aequatorialis* Thiele, 1920
    - Onykia robsoni (Adam, 1962) – rugose hooked squid
    - Onykia indica* Okutani, 1981
  - incertae sedis
    - ?Onykia appelloefi* Pfeffer, 1900
- Genus Ancistroteuthis Gray, 1849
  - Ancistroteuthis lichtensteinii (Ferussac, 1835) – angel clubhook squid or angel squid
- Genus Moroteuthopsis Pfeffer, 1908
  - Moroteuthopsis ingens (Smith, 1881) – greater hooked squid
  - Moroteuthopsis longimana Filippova, 1972
- Genus Notonykia Nesis, Roeleveld & Nikitina, 1998
  - Notonykia africanae Nesis, Roeleveld & Nikitina, 1998
  - Notonykia nesisi Bolstad, 2007
- Genus Filippovia Bolstad, 2010
  - Filippovia knipovitchi (Filippova, 1972) – smooth hooked squid
- Genus Walvisteuthis Nesis & Nikitina, 1986
  - Walvisteuthis jeremiahi Vecchione, Sosnowski & Young, 2015
  - Walvisteuthis rancureli (Okutani, 1981)
  - Walvisteuthis virilis Nesis & Nikitina, 1986
  - Walvisteuthis youngorum (Bolstad, 2010)

(*) indicates taxa requiring further taxonomic investigation
