= Onychoteuthis bergii =

Conservation status
- Data Deficient (IUCN 3.1)

Scientific classification
- Kingdom: Animalia
- Phylum: Mollusca
- Class: Cephalopoda
- Order: Oegopsida
- Family: Onychoteuthidae
- Genus: Onychoteuthis
- Species: O. bergii

Binomial name
- Onychoteuthis bergii Lichtenstein, 1818

Species of squid

Onychoteuthis bergii is a species of hooked squid from the family Onychoteuthidae. The species was originally described by Hinrich Lichtenstein from specimens taken near the Cape of Good Hope and is the type species of the genus Onychoteuthis. Until recently it was considered to be a junior synonym of Onychoteuthis banksii, but a re-examination of the type material, the lectotype and paralectotype which are deposited in the Natural History Museum, Berlin, showed that there were morphological differences which supported the status of O. bergii as a valid species. The species is found in the eastern South Atlantic and Indian Oceans.
