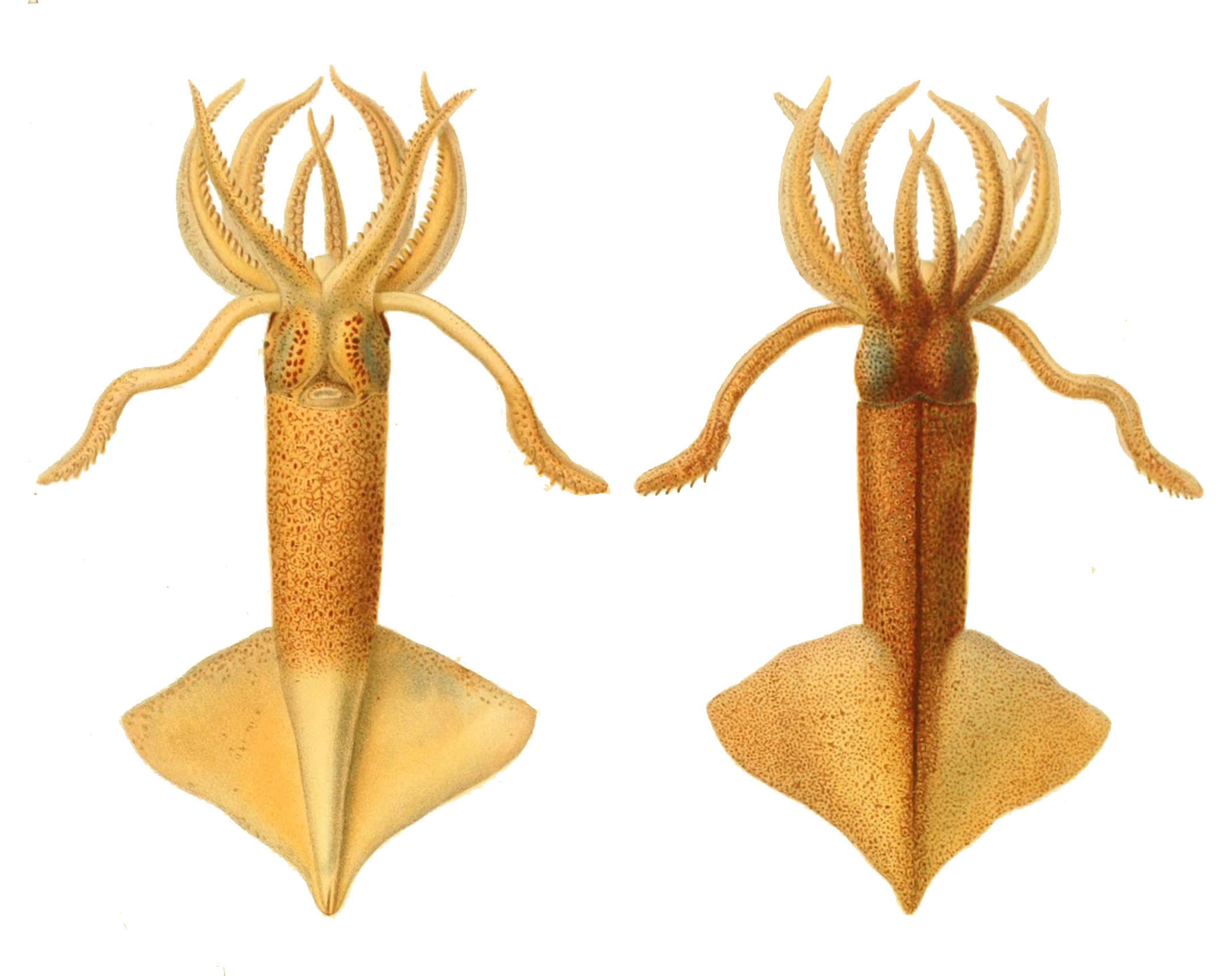

Conservation status
- Data Deficient (IUCN 3.1)

Scientific classification
- Kingdom: Animalia
- Phylum: Mollusca
- Class: Cephalopoda
- Order: Oegopsida
- Family: Onychoteuthidae
- Genus: Onychoteuthis
- Species: O. banksii

Binomial name
- Onychoteuthis banksii (Leach, 1817)

Synonyms
- Loligo banksii Leach, 1817; Loligo bianconii Vérany, 1847; Onychoteuthis fleuryi Reynaud, 1830; Onychoteuthis lesueurii d'Orbigny, 1835; Onychoteuthis molinae Lichtenstein, 1818; Teleoteuthis carolii Joubin, 1900

= Onychoteuthis banksii =

Common clubhook squid

Species of squid

Onychoteuthis banksii, the common clubhook squid, is a species of squid in the family Onychoteuthidae. It is the type species of the genus Onychoteuthis. This species was thought to have a worldwide distribution but with the revision of the genus Onychoteuthis in 2010, it is now accepted that Onychoteuthis banksii is restricted to the central and northern Atlantic and the Gulf of Mexico while a recently described species, Onychoteuthis horstkottei, is found in the Pacific Ocean. The type locality is the Gulf of Guinea.

== Description ==
The maximum mantle length is 350 mm (14 in). The eight arms are all of equal size and the tentacles are 27% of the mantle length. The clubs on the end of the tentacles bear two rows of strongly recurved hooks. There are two intestinal photophores, the anterior one being larger than the posterior one; there are also photophores in the form of whitish patches on the underside of the eyeballs.

Most squid live in deep water, and in these, the lens of the eye is translucent to ultraviolet light. However, O. banksii lives near the surface where ultraviolet light penetrates the water, and the lens is yellow, strongly absorbing blue light.

== Distribution and habitat ==
Although this species used to be considered to have a global distribution in tropical and temperate seas, it is now accepted that it is restricted to the north and central Atlantic Ocean and the Gulf of Mexico, with other species in the species complex occupying other parts of its previous range. It occurs in open waters from the sea surface down to depths of 800 m (2,600 ft); it often rises to the surface at nights, sometimes being found on the decks of ships.

== Ecology ==
Like all squid, O. banksii is a predator. With its long tentacles it can catch prey much larger than its relatively small mouth. The posterior salivary gland secretes a toxin which helps subdue the prey while the horny beak breaks it into small pieces that the squid is able to swallow; to a human, the bite of this squid feels like a wasp sting. The biology of this species is poorly known; it is short-lived, with females shedding their feeding tentacles at maturity, and after spawning, losing their turgidity and becoming weak.
