= Notonykia nesisi =

Conservation status
- Data Deficient (IUCN 3.1)

Scientific classification
- Kingdom: Animalia
- Phylum: Mollusca
- Class: Cephalopoda
- Order: Oegopsida
- Family: Onychoteuthidae
- Genus: Notonykia
- Species: N. nesisi

Binomial name
- Notonykia nesisi Bolstad, 2007

Species of mollusc

Notonykia nesisi is a species of squid in the family Onychoteuthidae. It is differentiated from Notonykia africanae by the shape of the tentacles. While the species is only known from immature specimens, it is known to achieve a mantle length of at least 100 mm. The tentacles are about 65-115% of the mantle length, and contain 6-18 hooks.
