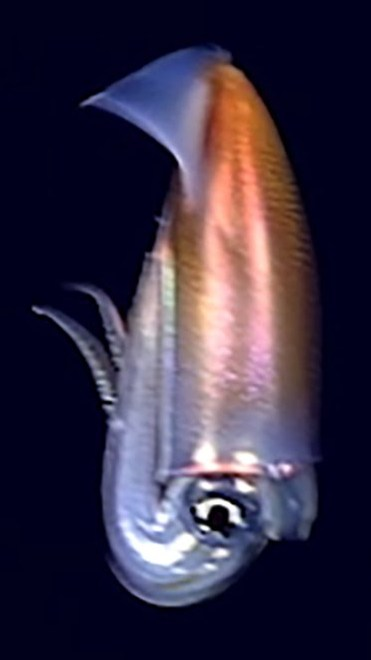
- Walvisteuthis youngorum

Scientific classification
- Domain: Eukaryota
- Kingdom: Animalia
- Phylum: Mollusca
- Class: Cephalopoda
- Order: Oegopsida
- Family: Onychoteuthidae
- Genus: Walvisteuthis; Nesis & Nikitina, 1986

Type species
- Walvisteuthis virilis Nesis & Nikitina, 1986

Synonyms
- Callimachus

= Walvisteuthis =

Genus of squids

Walvisteuthis, the stubby hook squids, is a genus of squid in the family Onychoteuthidae. The genus contains four species. They are characterised by possessing oval fins which are not drawn-out posteriorly, the gladius has elongated-rhomboid vanes and a short, blunt rostrum which is perpendicular to tip of gladius, the gladius is visible beneath skin at the dorsal midline and they only have primary occipital folds.

== Species ==
The four species currently recognised are:

- Walvisteuthis jeremiahi Vecchione, Sosnowski & Young, 2015
- Walvisteuthis rancureli (Okutani, 1981)
- Walvisteuthis virilis Nesis & Nikitina, 1986
- Walvisteuthis youngorum (Bolstad, 2010)
