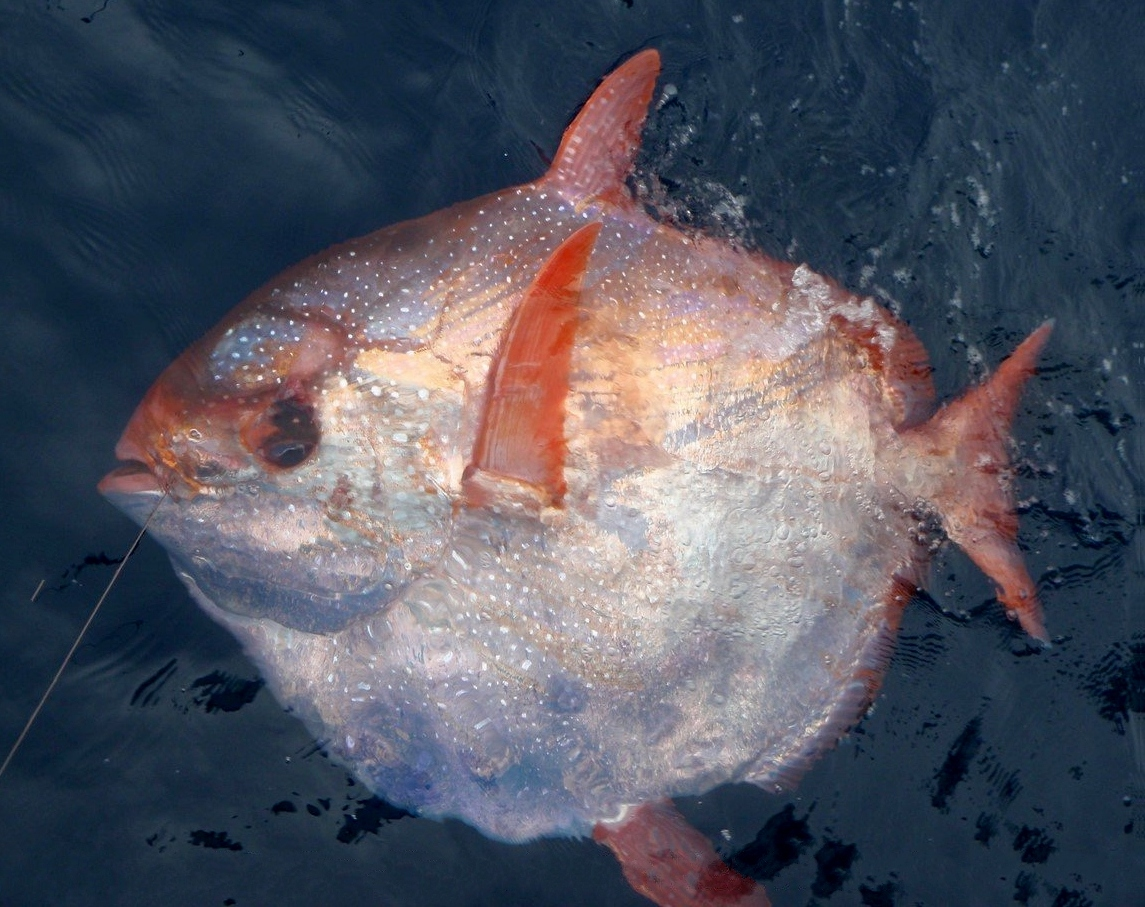

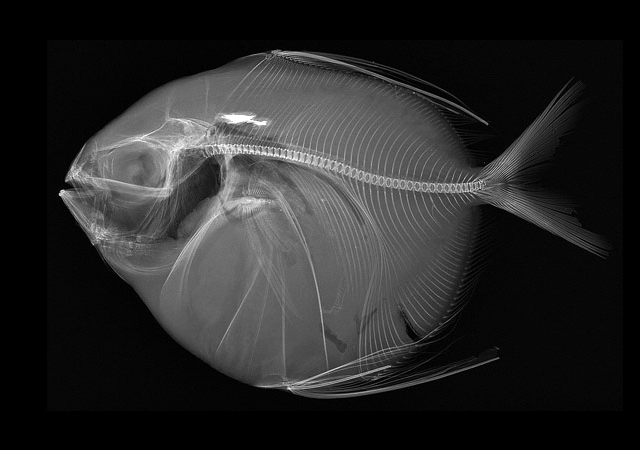
- Lampris guttatus, conventional and X-ray images

Conservation status
- Least Concern (IUCN 3.1)

Scientific classification
- Kingdom: Animalia
- Phylum: Chordata
- Class: Actinopterygii
- Division: Teleostei
- Order: Lampriformes
- Family: Lampridae
- Genus: Lampris
- Species: L. guttatus

Binomial name
- Lampris guttatus Brünnich, 1788

Synonyms
- Lampris lauta (Lowe, 1838); Lampris luna (Gmelin, 1789); Lampris regius (Bonnaterre, 1788); Scomber gunneri (Bloch & Schneider, 1801); Scomber pelagicus (Gunnerus, 1768); Zeus guttatus (Brünnich, 1788); Zeus imperialis (Shaw, 1793); Zeus luna (Gmelin, 1789); Zeus regius (Bonnaterre, 1788); Zeus stroemii (Walbaum, 1792)

= Lampris guttatus =

Species of fish

Lampris guttatus, commonly known as the opah, cravo, moonfish, kingfish, and Jerusalem haddock, is a large, colorful, deep-bodied pelagic lampriform fish belonging to the family Lampridae, which comprises the genus Lampris.

It is a pelagic fish with a worldwide distribution. While it is common to locations such as Hawaii and west Africa, it remains uncommon in others, including the Mediterranean. In the places where L. guttatus is prevalent, it is not a target of fishing, though it does represent an important commercial component of bycatch. It is common in restaurants in Hawaii. In Hawaiian longline fisheries, it is generally caught in deep nets targeting bigeye tuna. In 2005, the fish caught numbered 13,332. In areas where the fish is uncommon, such as the Mediterranean, its prevalence is increasing. Some researchers believe this a result of climate change. Much is still unknown about the distribution, interactions, life histories, and preferred habitats of this fish and other medium to large-sized pelagic fishes.

== Etymology and taxonomy ==
Danish zoologist Morten Thrane Brünnich described the species in 1788. The genus name Lampris is derived from the Ancient Greek word lampros, meaning "brilliant" or "clear", while the Latin species name guttatus means "spotted" and refers to the spotted body of this fish.

Although traditionally recognized as one of only two species of opah, the other being the southern opah (L. immaculatus), a review in 2018 found that the widely distributed "L. guttatus" consists of five distinct groups that differ in geographic range, genetics, morphology and meristics: North Atlantic opah (L. guttatus) of the northeast Atlantic including the North Sea and Mediterranean, East Atlantic opah (L. lauta) of the subtropical and warm temperate northeast Atlantic including the Mediterranean, southern spotted opah (L. australensis) of the subtropical and warm temperate Southern Hemisphere, smalleye Pacific opah (L. incognitus) of the central and northeast Pacific, and bigeye Pacific opah (L. megalopsis) found in tropical and subtropical parts of the West Atlantic, Pacific, Indian oceans.

== Description ==
Lampris guttatus is a large discoid and deeply keeled fish with a conspicuous coloration. They can reach a maximum length of 2 m (6.6 ft) and a maximum weight of 86 kg (190 lb), although there are reports of the fish reaching up to 270 kg (600 lb). The body is a deep steely blue grading to rosy on the belly, with white spots in irregular rows covering the flanks. Both the median and paired fins are a bright vermillion. Jaws are vermillion, too. The large eyes stand out as well, ringed with golden yellow. The body is covered in minute cycloid scales and its silvery, iridescent guanine coating is easily abraded.

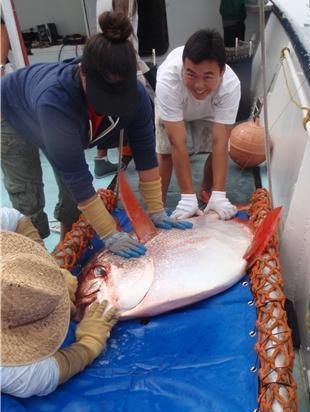
Researchers examine an opah caught off California

They have long falcated pectoral fins inserted (more or less) horizontally. The caudal fins are broadly lunated, forked, and emarginated. The pelvic fins are similar but a little longer than pectoral fins, with about 14–17 rays. The anterior portion of a dorsal fin (with about 50–55 rays) is greatly elongated, also in a falcate profile similar to the pelvic fins. The anal fin (34–41 rays) is about as high and as long as the shorter portion of the dorsal fin, and both fins have corresponding grooves into which they can be depressed. The snout is pointed and the mouth small, toothless, and terminal. The lateral line forms a high arch over the pectoral fins before sweeping down to the caudal peduncle.

=== Endothermy ===
In May 2015, L. guttatus was shown to maintain its entire body core above ambient temperature, becoming the first known fish with this trait ('whole-body endothermy'). The fish generates heat as well as propulsion with continuous movements of its pectoral fins (the musculature of which is insulated by a one-cm-thick layer of fat), and the vasculature of its gill tissue is arranged to conserve heat by a process of countercurrent heat exchange, a structure known as a rete mirabile (plural, retia). It can consistently keep its body core approximately 5 °C warmer than its environment. Elevated body core temperature should improve aerobic performance and physiologic function. Other adaptions of L. guttatus to increase aerobic performance include high hematocrit and a relatively large heart, gill surface area and aerobic muscle mass. These adaptations for high performance predation are similar to those found in tuna and lamnid sharks, which actively chase down their prey, but are very unusual among lampridiform fish, which are mostly sluggish ambush predators.

Previously, L. guttatus was known to exhibit cranial endothermy, generating and maintaining metabolic heat in the cranial and optic regions to keep them 2 °C warmer than the rest of the body. This adaptation is important for maintaining brain and eye function during the wide range of temperatures it experiences with its vertical movements.

Most fish are completely cold-blooded. Some, such as tuna and lamnid sharks (such as the salmon shark), have evolved regional endothermy, in which parts of the body core are kept at a warmer temperature. These fish have retia arranged to warm muscles used for propulsion, and some visceral organs, while other organs, such as the heart, remain cooler. Only L. guttatus is known to have retia within its gill arches (which are also insulated by fat), an arrangement that warms the entire body core including the heart.

== Distribution and habitat ==
Lampris guttatus has a worldwide distribution, from the Grand Banks to Argentina in the Western Atlantic, from Norway and Greenland to Senegal and south to Angola in the Eastern Atlantic (also in the Mediterranean), from the Gulf of Alaska to southern California in the Eastern Pacific, in temperate waters of the Indian Ocean, and rare forays into the Southern Ocean.

This species is presumed to live out its entire life in the open ocean, at mesopelagic depths of 50–500 m (160–1,640 ft), with possible forays into the bathypelagic zone. Typically, it is found within water at 8 to 22 °C. To better understand the depths L. guttatus inhabited in the tropical and temperate ocean waters, a study was performed, tagging them in the central North Pacific. Their location was found to be related to a temporal scale, inhabiting depths of 50–100 m during the night and 100–400 m during the day. The depths of the vertical habitat varied with local oceanogeographic conditions, though the patterns of deeper depths during the day is universal to the species.

The endothermy of Lampris guttatus gives them a major advantage at the depths where they live. Since they are relatively warm-blooded at those depths compared to the water around them, they can move more quickly to hunt prey. Most predators at such low depths do not have the energy to be able to move much and therefore must wait for prey to pass them.

== Behavior ==
The life history and development of L. guttatus remains rather uncertain. They are apparently solitary, but are known to school with tuna and other scombrids. They propel themselves by a lift-based mode of swimming using their pectoral fins. This, together with their forked caudal fins and depressible median fins, indicates that they swim at constantly low speeds. They are able to swim at over 25 cm/s, and one was even observed reaching 4 m/s (14 km/h; 8.9 mph) in a burst of speed.

Like many other large pelagic visual predators, such as swordfish and big-eye tuna, they exhibit vertical behavior. Based on those caught off the Hawaiian coast, squid and krill make up the bulk of their diet, though they also consume small fish. Those caught along the Patagonian Shelf also showed a narrow range of prey, the most common of which was the deepwater onychotenhid squid (Moroteuthis ingens).

They probably spawn in the spring. Their planktonic larvae lack dorsal and pelvic fins. The slender hatchlings undergo a marked and rapid transformation from a slender to deep-bodied form; this transformation is complete by 10.6 mm standard length.

== Fishery ==
L. guttatus is often regarded as a secondary target in commercial fisheries, and is taken incidentally while longline fishing for other pelagic species like tuna. It has been described to have a rich and creamy flavor, and are commonly used in sashimi.
