= Onykia appelloefi =

Scientific classification
- Domain: Eukaryota
- Kingdom: Animalia
- Phylum: Mollusca
- Class: Cephalopoda
- Order: Oegopsida
- Family: Onychoteuthidae
- Genus: Onykia
- Species: O. appelloefi

Binomial name
- Onykia appelloefi Pfeffer, 1900

Synonyms
- Onykia appellofi Pfeffer, 1900; Onykia appellöfi Pfeffer, 1900

Species of squid

Onykia appelloefi may be a species of squid in the family Onychoteuthidae. The species occurs in the Atlantic Ocean. It is a taxon inquirendum and it requires more research to confirm its validity as a species.
