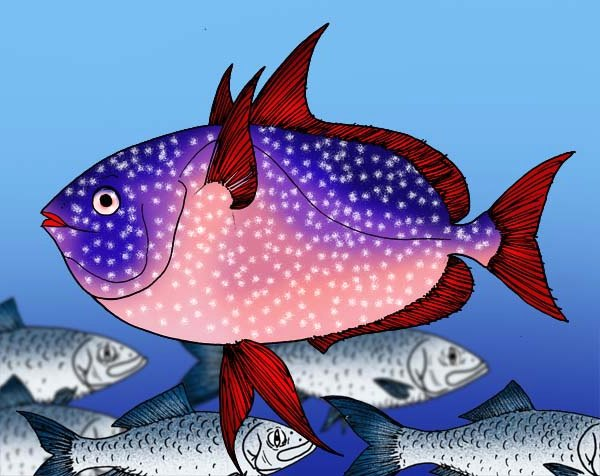

Scientific classification
- Kingdom: Animalia
- Phylum: Chordata
- Class: Actinopterygii
- Order: Lampriformes
- Family: Lampridae
- Genus: Lampris
- Species: L. zatima

Binomial name
- Lampris zatima (Jordan & Gilbert, 1920)

Synonyms
- Diatomoeca zatima Jordan & Gilbert, 1920; Dasceles dassurus Jordan, 1925

= Lampris zatima =

Lampris zatima Temporal range: Late Miocene

Extinct species of fish

Lampris zatima is the oldest known opah of the genus Lampris, from the Late Miocene of Southern California (the giant opah of the genus Megalampris, of Late Oligocene New Zealand, is older). Its fossil record is rather poor, known primarily from isolated vertebral columns, and a few headless specimens. Alive, it is estimated to have been around 20 to 30 centimeters long.

Mistakenly, it was later re-described as a surfperch, Dascles dassurus.
