= Onychoteuthis meridiopacifica =

Conservation status
- Data Deficient (IUCN 3.1)

Scientific classification
- Kingdom: Animalia
- Phylum: Mollusca
- Class: Cephalopoda
- Order: Oegopsida
- Family: Onychoteuthidae
- Genus: Onychoteuthis
- Species: O. meridiopacifica

Binomial name
- Onychoteuthis meridiopacifica Rancurel & Okutani, 1990

Species of squid

Onychoteuthis meridiopacifica is a species of squid in the family Onychoteuthidae. Males become mature at 40 mm, and the species is believed to reach a maximum mantle length of 90 mm, the smallest species in the genus Onychoteuthis. The tentacular club reaches a length of 20-25% of the mantle length, and contains 16-19 club hooks. Arms reach 27-44% of the mantle length, and each contain 50-60 suckers. 8-12 nuchal folds are present on each side of the head. Its short, broad fins and the possession of a small number marginal suckers on the tentacular clubs of adults are distinguishing characteristics of this species. It is found off eastern Australia and probably extends into seas off Indonesia as well as east to Tonga and Vanuatu.
