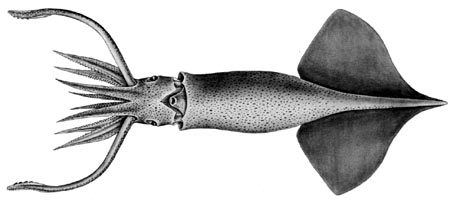

Conservation status
- Data Deficient (IUCN 3.1)

Scientific classification
- Kingdom: Animalia
- Phylum: Mollusca
- Class: Cephalopoda
- Order: Oegopsida
- Family: Onychoteuthidae
- Genus: Onychoteuthis
- Species: O. borealijaponica

Binomial name
- Onychoteuthis borealijaponica (Okada, 1927)

= Onychoteuthis borealijaponica =

Boreal clubhook squid

Species of squid

Onychoteuthis borealijaponica, the boreal clubhook squid, is a species of squid in the family Onychoteuthidae. It is the largest member of the genus Onychoteuthis, reaching a mantle length of 30 cm in males and 37 cm in females. Maturity is reached at 250 mm for males, and 300–350 mm in females. There are 24–27 hooks on each club, which is more than any other species in the genus Onychoteuthis. It is a pelagic species native to the North Pacific, although it migrates into Subarctic waters during the summer from its more southerly winter spawning grounds.
