= Walvisteuthis virilis =

Scientific classification
- Kingdom: Animalia
- Phylum: Mollusca
- Class: Cephalopoda
- Order: Oegopsida
- Family: Onychoteuthidae
- Genus: Walvisteuthis
- Species: W. virilis

Binomial name
- Walvisteuthis virilis Nesis & Nikitina, 1986

Species of squid

Walvisteuthis virilis is a species of squid from the family Onychoteuthidae, it is the type species of the genus Walvisteuthis. It may be synonymous with Walvisteuthis rancureli. The type specimen was collected, as a mature male with a mantle length of 71 mm, near the Walvis Ridge in the eastern South Atlantic Ocean at a depth of 1000m. A second specimen was subsequently collected on the other side of the South Atlantic, also a mature male with a total length of 71mm.
