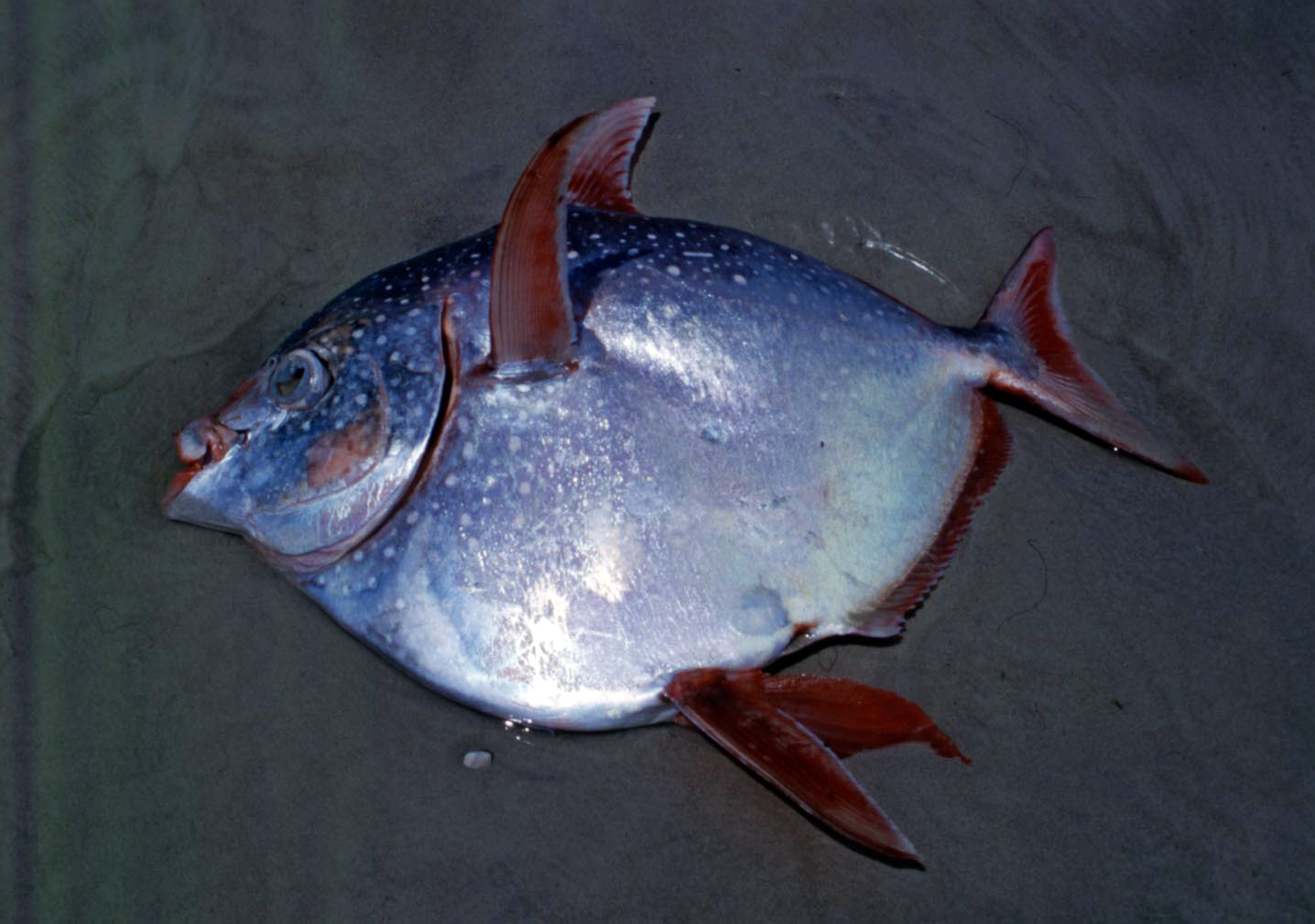

Scientific classification
- Kingdom: Animalia
- Phylum: Chordata
- Class: Actinopterygii
- Order: Lampriformes
- Family: Lampridae
- Genus: Lampris
- Species: L. australensis

Binomial name
- Lampris australensis Underkoffler, 2018

= Lampris australensis =

Southern spotted opah

Species of fish

Lampris australensis, the southern spotted opah, is a large, colorful, deep-bodied pelagic lampriform fish belonging to the family Lampridae, which comprises the genus Lampris.

It is found in the subtropical and warm temperate southern hemisphere.

A review in 2018 found that the widely distributed "L. guttatus" consisted of more than one species, such that several species including L. australensis were then differentiated from L. guttatus.
