= Lichtensteinia =

Lichtensteinia may refer to:

- Lichtensteinia (plant), a genus of plants in the family Apiaceae
- Lichtensteinia, a genus of plants in the family Loranthaceae, synonym of Tapinanthus
- Lichtensteinia, a genus of true bugs in the family Coccidae, synonym of Lichtensia
