= Moroteuthopsis longimana =

Conservation status
- Least Concern (IUCN 3.1)

Scientific classification
- Kingdom: Animalia
- Phylum: Mollusca
- Class: Cephalopoda
- Order: Oegopsida
- Family: Onychoteuthidae
- Genus: Moroteuthopsis
- Species: M. longimana

Binomial name
- Moroteuthopsis longimana (Filippova, 1972)

Synonyms
- Kondakovia longimana Filippova, 1972; Kondakovia nigmatullini Laptikhovsky, Arkhipkin & Bolstad, 2009

Species of squid

Moroteuthopsis longimana, previously Kondakovia longimana, the giant warty squid or longarm octopus squid (though it is not a true octopus squid), is a large species of hooked squid. It attains a mantle length of at least 85 cm (33 in) and probably over 1.15 m (3 ft 9 in). The largest complete specimen of this species, measuring 2.3 m (7 ft 7 in) in total length, was found in Antarctica in 2000.

The previous generic name was in honor of N. N. Kondakov, a "noted Russian malacologist".

== Description ==
M. longimana is a large squid, the adults can grow to a mantle length of 740 mm (29 in), which is characterised by the presence of 33 hooks and marginal suckers throughout the tentacular club during subadult years. The gladius of this species is not visible beneath the skin in the dorsal midline. M. longimana possesses three nuchal folds.

== Type material ==
The type material of this species, consisting of three specimens caught at the surface and a depth of 50 m (160 ft), was collected just north of the South Orkney Islands and is deposited at the Zoological Museum of Moscow State University.

== Distribution ==
M. longimana occurs in epipelagic and mesopelagic waters of the Southern Ocean. Its range may be circumpolar with an Antarctic and Sub-Antarctic distribution, stretching as far north as South Georgia and the Tasman Sea.

== Ecology ==
This squid is eaten by several predators in the Southern Ocean, mainly sharks (sleeper sharks and porbeagles, accounting for 21% and 19% of the cephalopod biomass consumed by each shark, respectively), albatrosses, sperm whales and penguins.

Several prey have been identified for the diet of M. longimana, with krill as the main source of food. However, indirect methods have pointed for other high trophic level prey as other crustaceans and lanternfish.

== See also ==
- Cephalopod size
