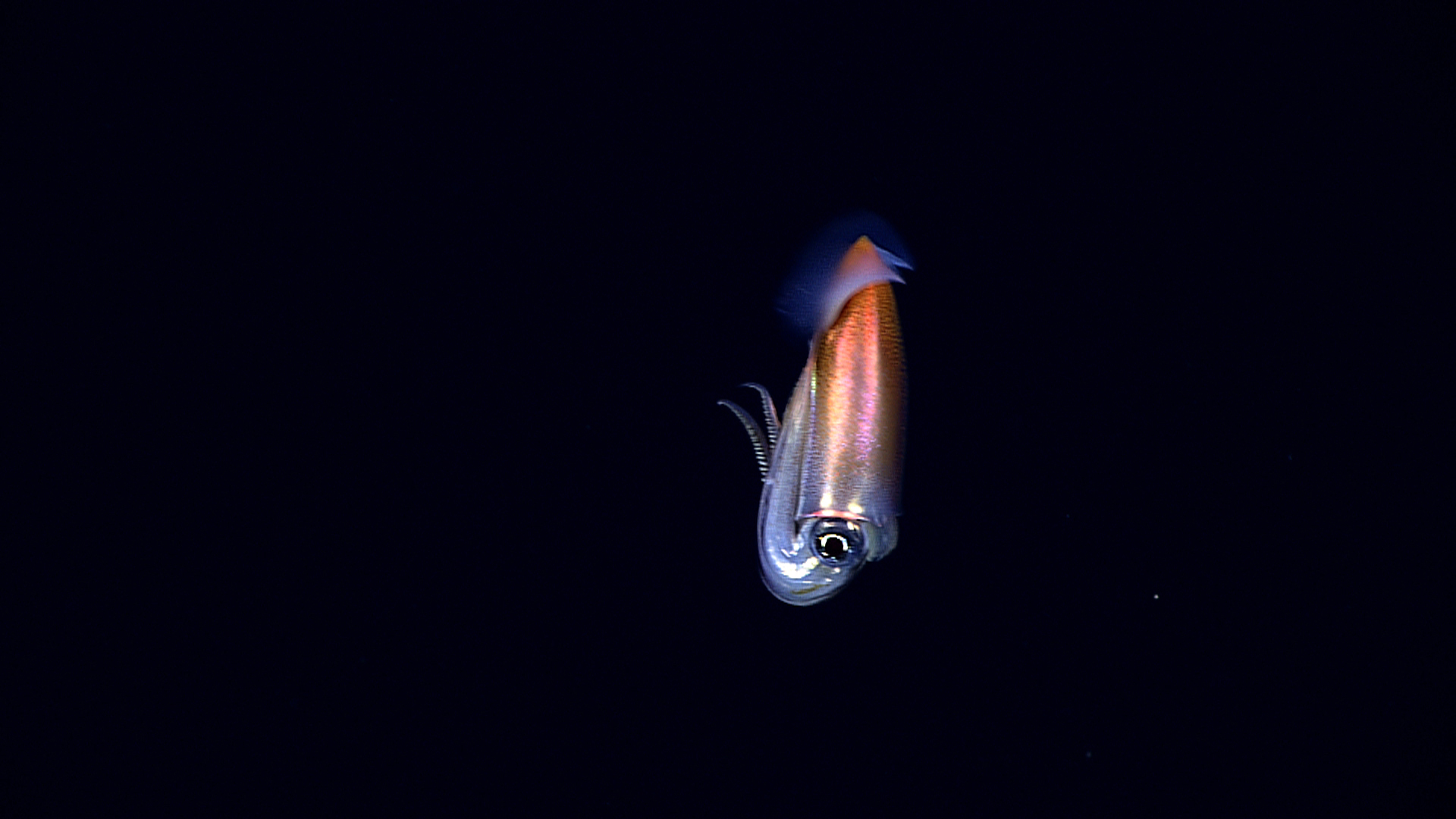
- The first filmed encounter with Walvisteuthis youngorum, as seen from a depth of ~900 meters

Conservation status
- Data Deficient (IUCN 3.1)

Scientific classification
- Kingdom: Animalia
- Phylum: Mollusca
- Class: Cephalopoda
- Order: Oegopsida
- Family: Onychoteuthidae
- Genus: Walvisteuthis
- Species: W. youngorum

Binomial name
- Walvisteuthis youngorum (Bolstad, 2010)

= Walvisteuthis youngorum =

Species of squid

Walvisteuthis youngorum is a species of squid from the family Onychoteuthidae. They can be found off of the northern Hawaiian Islands. They are rarely seen due to the depth that they reside in, and have only been filmed once, in 2015.
