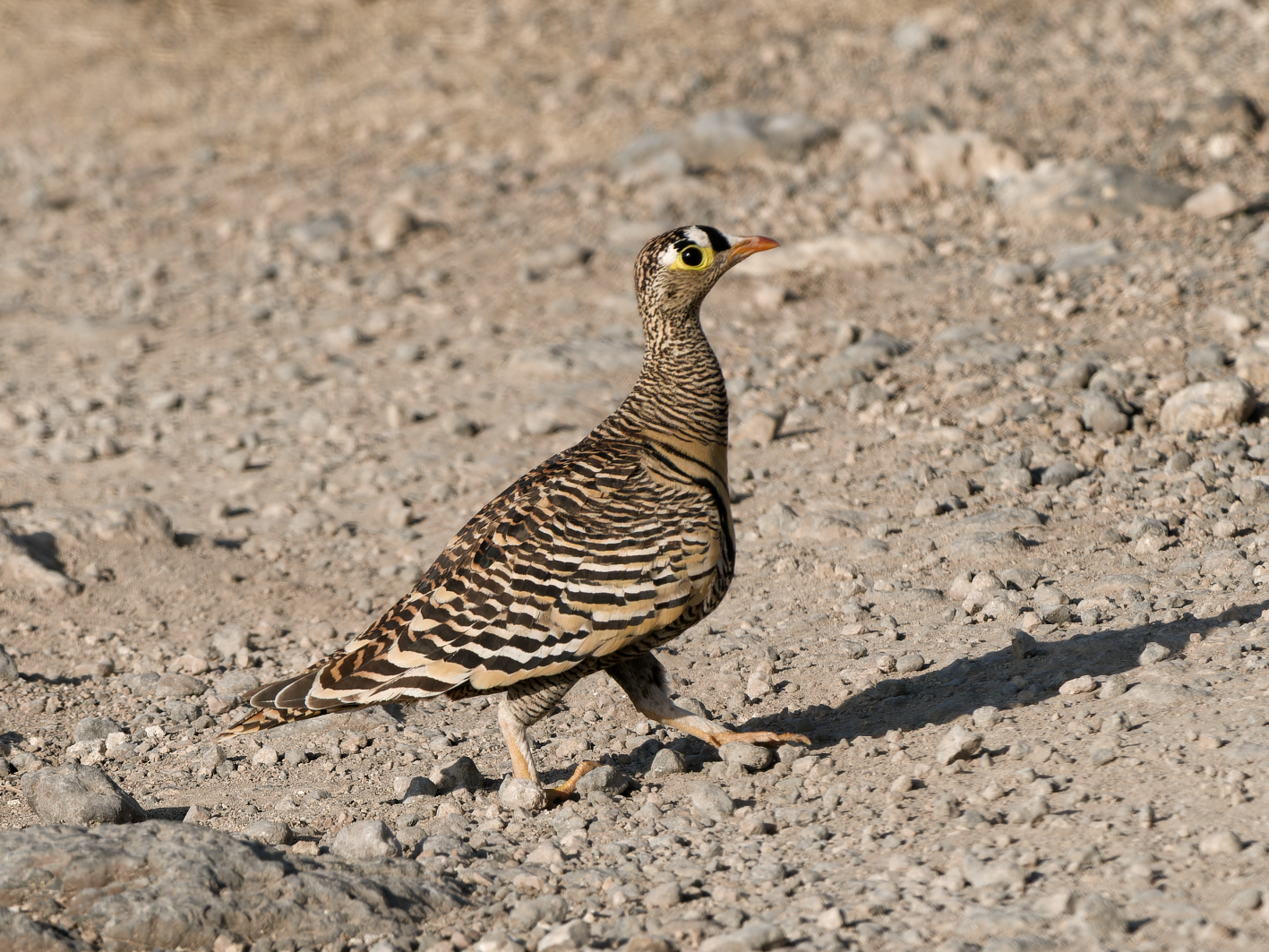
- Male in Samburu National Park, Kenya

Conservation status
- Least Concern (IUCN 3.1)

Scientific classification
- Kingdom: Animalia
- Phylum: Chordata
- Class: Aves
- Order: Pterocliformes
- Family: Pteroclidae
- Genus: Pterocles
- Species: P. lichtensteinii

Binomial name
- Pterocles lichtensteinii Temminck, 1825

= Lichtenstein's sandgrouse =

Species of bird

Lichtenstein's sandgrouse (Pterocles lichtensteinii) is a species of sandgrouse in the family Pteroclidae. It is named after the German naturalist Martin Lichtenstein. A small, closely barred bird of stony deserts and arid hills, it ranges across northern and eastern Africa, the Middle East and south-western Asia to Pakistan. It is nomadic and mostly nocturnal, drinking before dawn and after dusk.

== Description ==
Lichtenstein's sandgrouse is a small, stocky sandgrouse about 25 cm (9.8 in) long and weighing 175–250 g (6.2–8.8 oz). It lacks the elongated central tail feathers of some other sandgrouse, and both sexes are closely barred blackish on a buff ground, above and below.

== Distribution and habitat ==
Lichtenstein's sandgrouse has a very large range, covering some 18,200,000 square kilometres (7,000,000 sq mi) across Africa and south-western Asia. It is found from near the equator in Kenya north and east through the Middle East to Afghanistan and Pakistan. In Africa it occurs in Algeria, Chad, Djibouti, Egypt, Eritrea, Ethiopia, Libya, Mali, Mauritania, Morocco, Niger, Senegal, Somalia, Sudan and Uganda; in Asia it occurs in Iran, Iraq, Israel, Jordan, Oman, Pakistan, Palestine, Saudi Arabia, the United Arab Emirates and Yemen.

The most desert-adapted of the sandgrouse, it frequents stony and rocky desert, arid hills, and acacia scrub along dry watercourses.

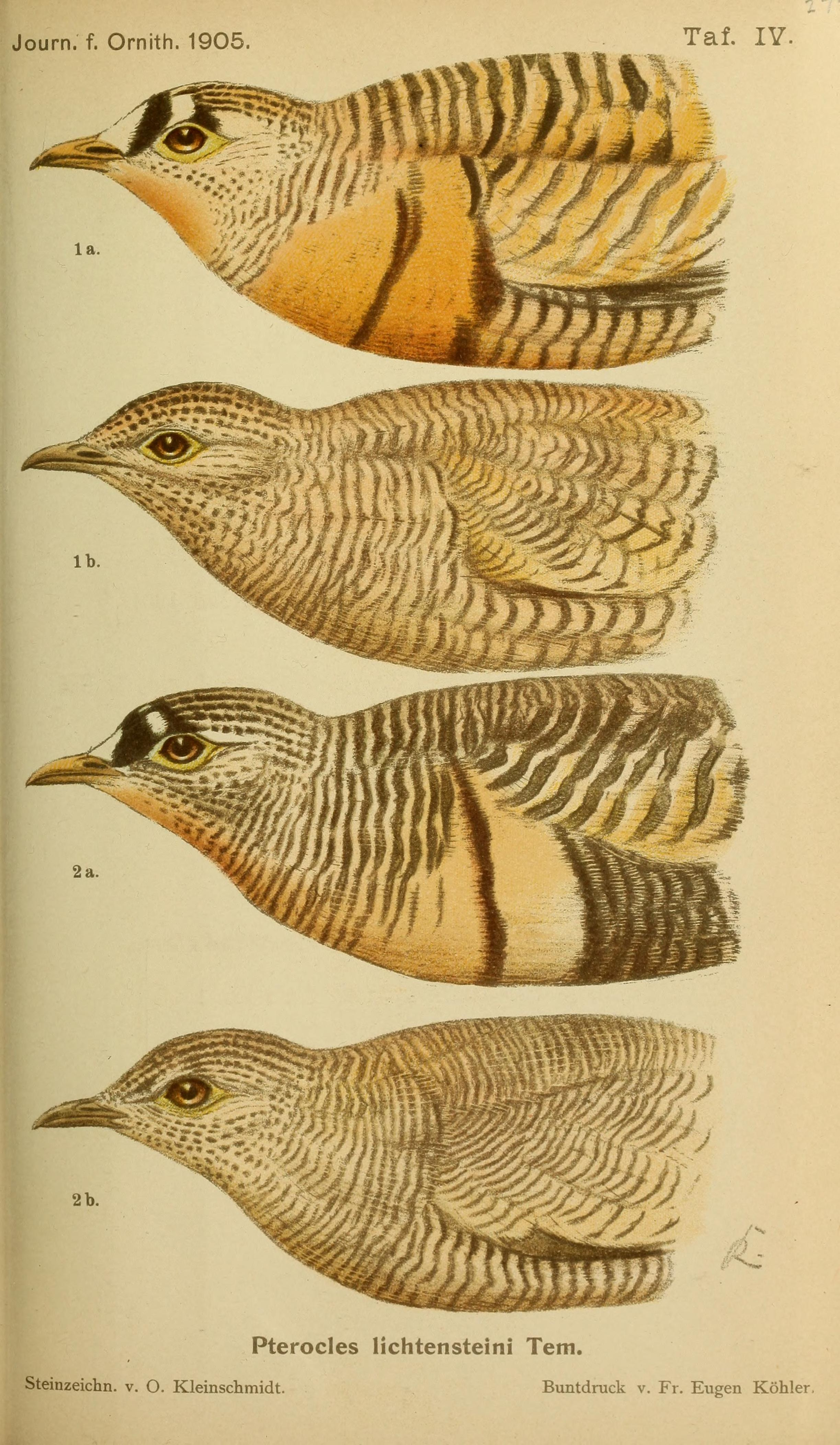
P. l. sukensis ♂,♀ P. l. lichtensteinii ♂,♀

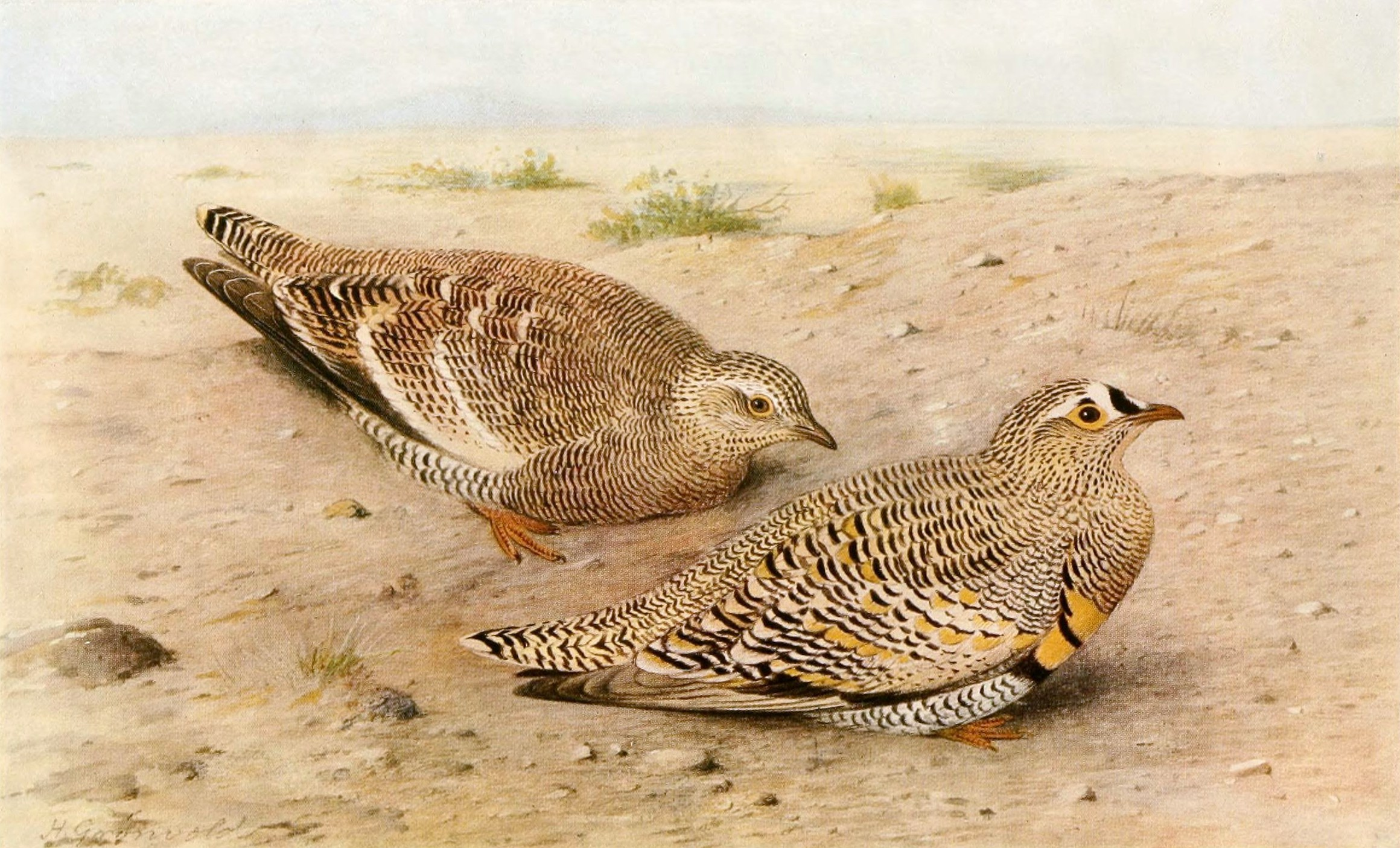
P. l. arabicus

== Subspecies ==
Five subspecies are recognised:

- P. l. targius von Schweppenburg, 1916 – Sahara and Sahel
- P. l. lichtensteinii Temminck, 1825 – Israel to Somalia and Socotra
- P. l. sukensis Neumann, 1909 – South Sudan to central Kenya
- P. l. ingramsi Bates & Kinnear, 1937 – local in Yemen
- P. l. arabicus Neumann, 1909 – Arabia to Pakistan

== Behaviour and ecology ==
Lichtenstein's sandgrouse feeds on small, hard seeds, especially those of acacia and other legumes. It is usually seen in pairs or small groups by day, gathering into larger flocks at dusk to fly to water; like other sandgrouse it is well adapted to conserving water, and the male can carry water to its young in its belly feathers. Breeding is mainly from May to July, the nest being a shallow scrape among scattered rocks and vegetation, with a clutch of usually two or three camouflaged eggs.

== Status ==
With an extremely large range and a population thought to be stable, the species is assessed as being of least concern on the IUCN Red List.
