= Notonykia =

Scientific classification
- Domain: Eukaryota
- Kingdom: Animalia
- Phylum: Mollusca
- Class: Cephalopoda
- Order: Oegopsida
- Family: Onychoteuthidae
- Genus: Notonykia; Nesis, Roeleveld and Nikitina, 1998

Type species
- Notonykia africanae Nesis, Roeleveld & Nikitina, 1998

Species
- Notonykia africanae Nesis, Roeleveld & Nikitina, 1998; Notonykia nesisi Bolstad, 2007

Genus of squids

Notonykia is a genus of squid in the family Onychoteuthidae. The type species is Notonykia africanae.
