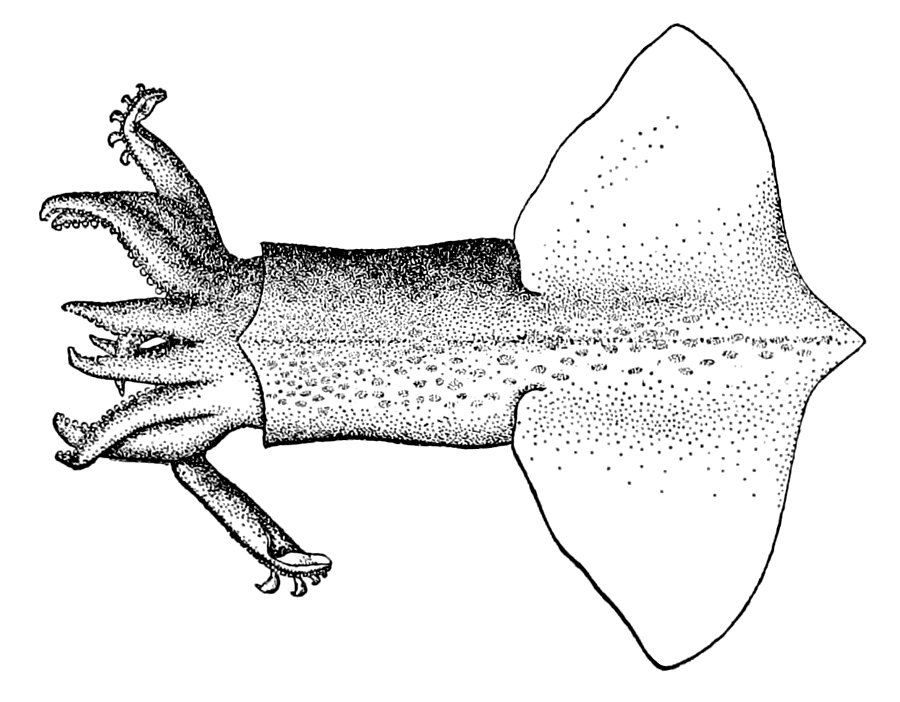

Conservation status
- Data Deficient (IUCN 3.1)

Scientific classification
- Kingdom: Animalia
- Phylum: Mollusca
- Class: Cephalopoda
- Order: Oegopsida
- Family: Onychoteuthidae
- Genus: Onychoteuthis
- Species: O. compacta

Binomial name
- Onychoteuthis compacta (Berry, 1913)

Synonyms
- Teleoteuthis compacta (Berry, 1913)

= Onychoteuthis compacta =

Species of squid

Onychoteuthis compacta is a species of squid in the family Onychoteuthidae, known to occur in Hawaiian waters. as well as in other areas of the Central Pacific and western north-central Atlantic, it probably has a circumglobar distribution. The species is known to have a mantle length of at least 122 mm for females and 127 mm for males. Each tentacle has 22 club hooks, measuring approximately 30 mm in mature specimens.
