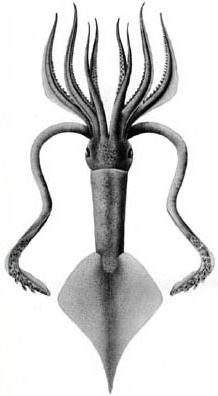
- Ancistroteuthis lichtensteinii

Conservation status
- Least Concern (IUCN 3.1)

Scientific classification
- Kingdom: Animalia
- Phylum: Mollusca
- Class: Cephalopoda
- Order: Oegopsida
- Family: Onychoteuthidae
- Genus: Ancistroteuthis; Gray, 1849
- Species: A. lichtensteinii

Binomial name
- Ancistroteuthis lichtensteinii (Férussac, 1835)

Synonyms
- Onychoteuthis hamatus Risso, 1854; Onychoteuthis lichtensteini Orbigny, 1839

= Ancistroteuthis =

Angel clubhook squid

Genus of squids

Ancistroteuthis lichtensteinii, also known as the angel clubhook squid or simply angel squid, is a species of squid in the family Onychoteuthidae and the sole member of the genus Ancistroteuthis. It grows to a mantle length of 30 cm. It lives in the western Mediterranean Sea, subtropical and tropical eastern Atlantic Ocean and western north Atlantic Ocean. Its diet include mesopelagic fish and pelagic crustaceans. It is sometimes taken as bycatch by commercial fisheries, but is not a targeted species.

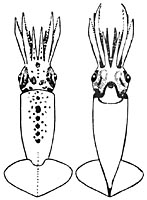
Dorsal and ventral views of juvenile A. lichtensteinii (16 mm ML)

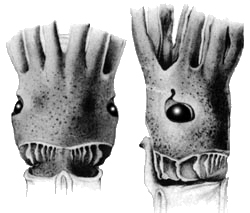
Dorsal and lateral views of head and occipital folds (145 mm ML)

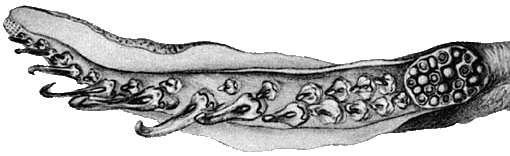
Oral view of tentacular club (145 mm ML)
Ventral and enlarged side views of gladius (165 mm ML)

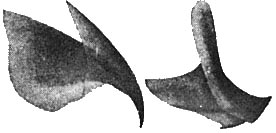
Upper (left) and lower (right) beaks (URL ca. 3 mm)
