= Onychoteuthis prolata =

Conservation status
- Data Deficient (IUCN 3.1)

Scientific classification
- Kingdom: Animalia
- Phylum: Mollusca
- Class: Cephalopoda
- Order: Oegopsida
- Family: Onychoteuthidae
- Genus: Onychoteuthis
- Species: O. prolata

Binomial name
- Onychoteuthis prolata (Bolstad, Vecchione & Young, 2008)

Species of squid

Onychoteuthis prolata is a species of squid in the family Onychoteuthidae. They can be found in the Eastern Pacific Ocean off the coast of Hawaii, and can grow to 15.5 centimeters in length.
