= Onykia loennbergii =

Japanese hooked squid

Conservation status
- Least Concern (IUCN 3.1)

Scientific classification
- Kingdom: Animalia
- Phylum: Mollusca
- Class: Cephalopoda
- Order: Oegopsida
- Family: Onychoteuthidae
- Genus: Onykia
- Species: O. loennbergii

Binomial name
- Onykia loennbergii (Ishikawa & Wakiya, 1914)

Synonyms
- Moroteuthis lonnbergii Ishikawa & Wakiya, 1914

Species of squid

Onykia loennbergii, the Japanese hooked squid, is a species of squid in the family Onychoteuthidae, named by Swedish zoologist Einar Lönnberg. It occurs in the Western Pacific Ocean, at an estimated depth of 230–1200 m. The mantle length is approximately 300 mm. Each tentacular club contains 25 hooks. The arms are about 60% of the size of the mantle length.
