= Moroteuthopsis =

Scientific classification
- Kingdom: Animalia
- Phylum: Mollusca
- Class: Cephalopoda
- Order: Oegopsida
- Family: Onychoteuthidae
- Genus: Moroteuthopsis; Pfeffer, 1908

Type species
- Onychoteuthis ingens E. A. Smith, 1881

Species
- Moroteuthopsis ingens (E. A. Smith, 1881); Moroteuthopsis longimana (Filippova, 1972)

Synonyms
- Kondakovia Filippova, 1972

Genus of squids

Moroteuthopsis is a genus of squid in the family Onychoteuthidae. The type species is Moroteuthopsis ingens. Prior to 2018, Moroteuthopsis was considered a subgenus of Onykia; after the mitochondrial DNA of the family Onychoteuthidae was studied, "O." ingens was found to group together with Kondakovia, and the subgenus Moroteuthopsis was elevated to full genus status.

This genus is similar to Onykia, both possessing warty or longitudinally-ridged skin, ammoniacal tissues, large body size, and the lack of photophores, but can be distinguished by Mo. spp. lacking a Y-shaped ridge in the funnel and symmetrical grooves on the "claw portion" of the tentacular hooks, both of these present in Onykia, along with the rostrum segment of the gladius being proportionally shorter in Mo. spp..
