= Walvisteuthis jeremiahi =

Scientific classification
- Kingdom: Animalia
- Phylum: Mollusca
- Class: Cephalopoda
- Order: Oegopsida
- Family: Onychoteuthidae
- Genus: Walvisteuthis
- Species: W. jeremiahi

Binomial name
- Walvisteuthis jeremiahi (Vecchione, Sosnowski & Young, 2015)

Species of squid

Walvisteuthis jeremiahi is a species of squid from the family Onychoteuthidae. They have only been observed in the Gulf of Mexico.
