= Onychoteuthis lacrima =

Conservation status
- Data Deficient (IUCN 3.1)

Scientific classification
- Kingdom: Animalia
- Phylum: Mollusca
- Class: Cephalopoda
- Order: Oegopsida
- Family: Onychoteuthidae
- Genus: Onychoteuthis
- Species: O. lacrima

Binomial name
- Onychoteuthis lacrima (Bolstad & Seki, 2008)

Species of squid

Onychoteuthis lacrima is a species of squid in the family Onychoteuthidae. They are found off the coast of central and southern Japan, and can grow to ~11.2 centimeters in length.
