= Lampris immaculatus =

Conservation status
- Least Concern (IUCN 3.1)

Scientific classification
- Kingdom: Animalia
- Phylum: Chordata
- Class: Actinopterygii
- Order: Lampriformes
- Family: Lampridae
- Genus: Lampris
- Species: L. immaculatus

Binomial name
- Lampris immaculatus Gilchrist, 1904

Species of fish

Lampris immaculatus, commonly known as the southern opah or southern moonfish, is a species of fish native to the Southern Ocean. The species is found commonly in New Zealand waters. They are caught commercially using long-line fishery in New Zealand. The most common prey species for the southern opah are juvenile onychoteuthid squid Moroteuthis ingens, which were found in 93% of 69 fish. It was discovered that 14% of the opahs contained plastic pollutants in their digestive tract, which indicates signs of high plastic pollution in the Southwest Atlantic.
