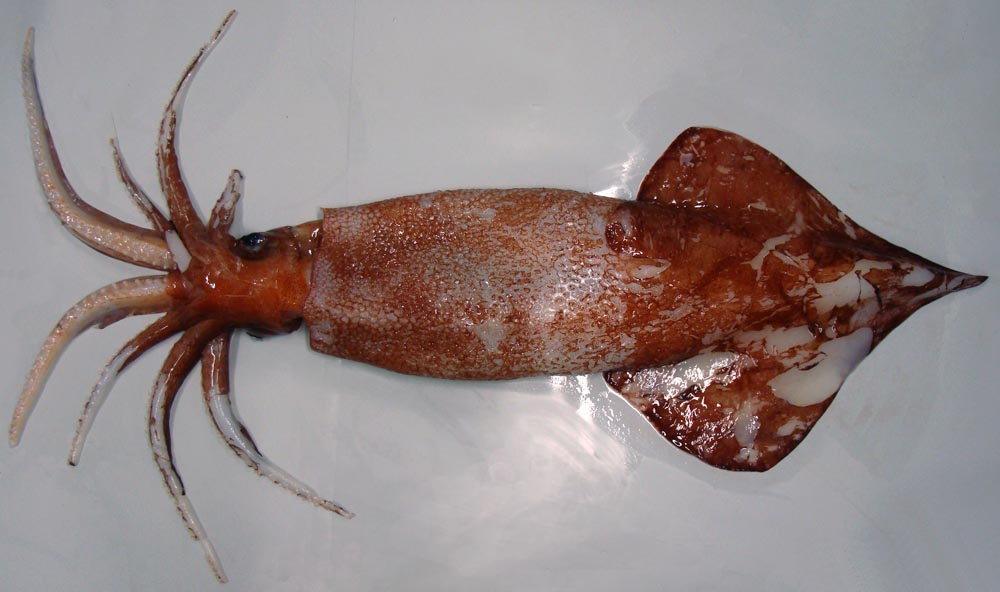
- Mature female (88.5 cm ML, 11.1 kg weight) from the Chatham Rise near New Zealand
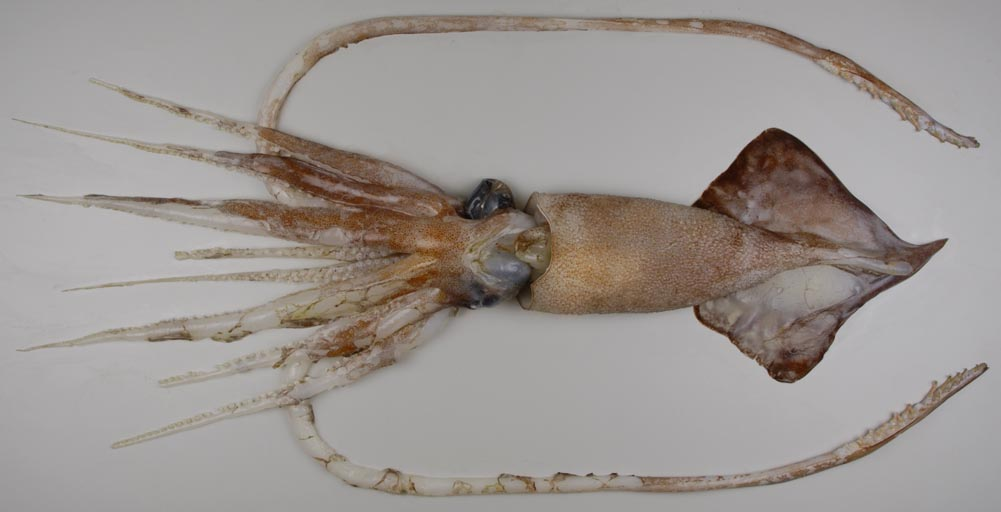
- Immature female (26.0 cm ML), also from the Chatham Rise

Conservation status
- Least Concern (IUCN 3.1)

Scientific classification
- Kingdom: Animalia
- Phylum: Mollusca
- Class: Cephalopoda
- Order: Oegopsida
- Family: Onychoteuthidae
- Genus: Onykia
- Species: O. robsoni

Binomial name
- Onykia robsoni (Adam, 1962)

Synonyms
- Moroteuthis robsoni Adam, 1962

= Onykia robsoni =

Rugose hooked squid

Species of squid

Onykia robsoni, the rugose hooked squid, is a species of squid in the family Onychoteuthidae. It occurs in the Antarctic Ocean, at an estimated depth of 250–550 meters. The mantle of this species grows to a length of 75 cm. The species has been suggested as a junior synonym of Onykia carriboea, the tropical clubhook squid, due to similarities between the species.
