= Lichtenstein's seahorse =

Scientific classification
- Kingdom: Animalia
- Phylum: Chordata
- Class: Actinopterygii
- Order: Syngnathiformes
- Family: Syngnathidae
- Genus: Hippocampus
- Species: H. lichtensteinii

Binomial name
- Hippocampus lichtensteinii Kaup, 1856

Species of fish

Lichtenstein's seahorse (Hippocampus lichtensteinii) is a species of fish in the family Syngnathidae. This species requires further investigation to ensure validity.

The seahorse is named in honor of zoologist Martin Heinrich Carl Lichtenstein (1780–1857) of the Museum für Naturkunde Berlin, who provided the type specimen.

== Description ==
Lichtenstein's seahorse is pale brown in colour without markings. It reaches a maximum length of 4.0 cm. Its coronet is high, columnar or knob-like, lacking spines.

== Distribution ==
Lichtenstein's seahorse is found in the Western Indian Ocean and the Red Sea.
