= Lampris incognitus =

Scientific classification
- Kingdom: Animalia
- Phylum: Chordata
- Class: Actinopterygii
- Division: Teleostei
- Order: Lampriformes
- Family: Lampridae
- Genus: Lampris
- Species: L. incognitus

Binomial name
- Lampris incognitus Underkoffler, Luers, Hyde & Craig, 2018

Species of fish

Lampris incognitus, the small-eye Pacific opah, is a bathypelagic, marine; ray-finned fish of the infraclass Teleostei. It belongs to the order Lampriformes, and is in the family Lampridae. It is endemic to the "transpacific" (East & Central and/or West Pacific Ocean).

Though there is not much species specific documentation on the small-eye opah due to the "newness" of its taxonomic classification, research suggests that they exhibit much of the same characteristics as other species in the genus.

== Morphology ==
The small-eye pacific opah has a deeply compressed, oval body shape. Its mouth is small in size and lacking teeth. The entirety of its head and body is covered with densely packed round, pale spots of two distinct sizes. Dorsal and caudal fins are sometimes tipped with white, and the caudal fin is characterized by a translucent edge.

== Diet ==
The small-eye pacific opah has a carnivorous diet, similar to other species of opah, mainly consisting of squid and small bony fish including mackerels, saury and anchovy. Although they are carnivores the small-eye opah lack teeth. The small-eye opah is fully warm-blooded (endothermy) making it very agile when it comes to chasing their prey.

== Discovery ==
It was originally thought that there was only two species of opah until a discovery in 2018 was made at a fish auction located in Honolulu, Hawaii. A fisher buyer noticed differences about the available opahs and this lead was followed up by contractors from the NOAA where they took tissue samples from each different looking fish to test if there were any differences in the DNA. The DNA samples taken showed variety, which took the number of species from the original two known to a total of six, including the small-eye pacific opah.

== Geographic distribution ==
Endemic to the central and northeast Pacific. Catch data suggests a geographic range from the southern coast of California down the Baja Peninsula. Though, literature suggests that their range may extend up the Californian coast to the southern coast of Alaska.

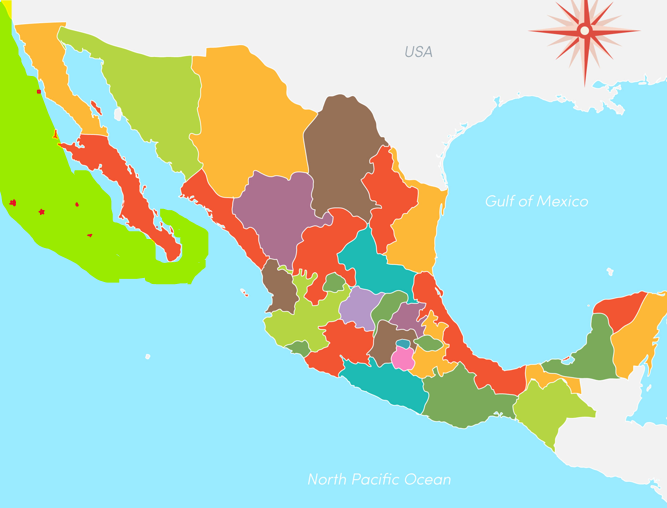
Estimated geographic distribution of small-eye opah based on confirmed catch data
