= Filippovia knipovitchi =

Conservation status
- Least Concern (IUCN 3.1)

Scientific classification
- Kingdom: Animalia
- Phylum: Mollusca
- Class: Cephalopoda
- Order: Oegopsida
- Family: Onychoteuthidae
- Genus: Filippovia; Bolstad, 2010
- Species: F. knipovitchi

Binomial name
- Filippovia knipovitchi (Filippova, 1972)

Synonyms
- Moroteuthis knipovitchi Filippova, 1972; Onykia knipovitchi (Filippova, 1972)

Species of squid

Filippovia knipovitchi, the smooth hooked squid, is a species of squid in the family Onychoteuthidae and the sole member of the genus Filippovia. It is found in the Antarctic and Atlantic Oceans, and reaches a mantle length of 35 cm.
