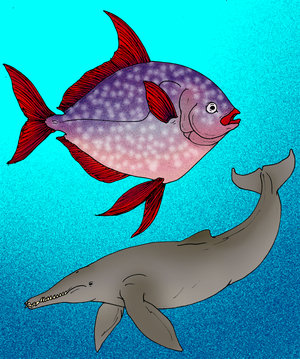
- M. keyesi and Waipatia maerewhenua

Scientific classification
- Kingdom: Animalia
- Phylum: Chordata
- Class: Actinopterygii
- Order: Lampriformes
- Family: Lampridae
- Genus: †Megalampris
- Species: †M. keyesi

Binomial name
- †Megalampris keyesi Gottfried, Fordyce & Rust, 2006

= Megalampris =

Megalampris Temporal range: Late Oligocene

Extinct species of fish

Megalampris keyesi is an extinct species of opah from the late Oligocene of New Zealand about 26 million years ago. It was recovered from the Otekaike Limestone in North Otago, by a team led by Ewan Fordyce from the Geology Department of the University of Otago. The species is named in honour of the New Zealand palaeontologist Ian Warwick Keyes (1938–2004). It is the largest fossil teleost fish from New Zealand, the spectacular remains comprise three large limestone blocks containing mostly caudal skeleton. These are on display in the Otago Museum, Dunedin, New Zealand. Some of the vertebral centra preserved are 90 mm across. Comparison with the skeletons of living Lampris species suggest the giant fish was around 4 metres (13 ft) in length when alive, which is twice the length of the largest living opah species, Lampris guttatus. The cleithra in the fossil are significantly enlarged to suggest that Megalampris used the pectoral swimming mode characteristic of moonfishes.
