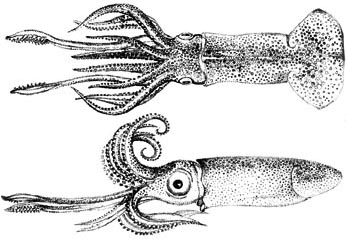
- Holotype of Onykia carriboea (25 mm ML)

Conservation status
- Data Deficient (IUCN 3.1)

Scientific classification
- Kingdom: Animalia
- Phylum: Mollusca
- Class: Cephalopoda
- Order: Oegopsida
- Family: Onychoteuthidae
- Genus: Onykia
- Species: O. carriboea

Binomial name
- Onykia carriboea Lesueur, 1821

Synonyms
- Onychia binotata Pfeffer, 1884; Sepiola cardioptera Lesueur, 1821; Teleoteuthis agilis Verrill, 1885

= Onykia carriboea =

Tropical clubhook squid

Species of squid

Onykia carriboea, the tropical clubhook squid, is a squid in the family Onychoteuthidae, the type species of the genus Onykia. It is known with certainty only from immature specimens. The type locality of O. carriboea is the Gulf of Mexico. Onykia robsoni has been suggested as a junior synonym, owing to similarities between the species.
