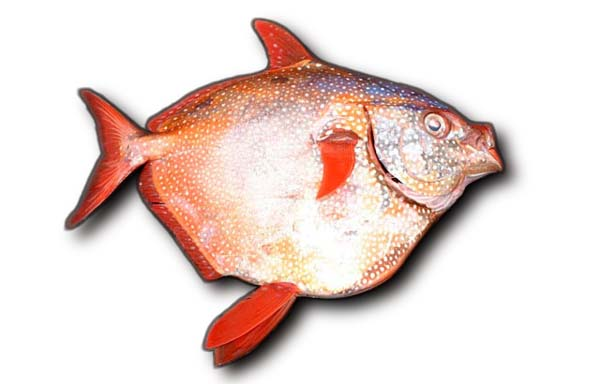
- Lampris guttatus

Scientific classification
- Kingdom: Animalia
- Phylum: Chordata
- Class: Actinopterygii
- Order: Lampriformes
- Family: Lampridae; Gill, 1862
- Genus: Lampris; Retzius, 1799

Species
- See text

= Opah =

Opah Temporal range: Late Miocene–present

Genus of fishes

The opah, also commonly known as moonfish, sunfish (not to be confused with Molidae or ocean sunfish), cowfish, kingfish, and redfin ocean pan are large, colorful, deep-bodied pelagic lampriform fishes comprising the genus Lampris, of the small family Lampridae (also spelled Lamprididae).

== Species ==
Two living species were traditionally recognized, but a taxonomic review in 2018 suggests the idea of splitting L. guttatus into several species, each with a more restricted geographic range, bringing the total to six. The six species of Lampris have mostly non-overlapping geographical ranges, and can be recognized based on body shape and coloration pattern.

- Southern Spotted Opah (Lampris australensis): Found in the Southern Hemisphere, primarily in the Pacific and Indian Oceans.
- North Atlantic Opah (Lampris guttatus): Potentially located in the Northeastern Atlantic, including the Mediterranean Sea.
- Southern Opah (Lampris immaculatus): Geographical range extends from 34° S to the Antarctic Polar Front.
- Smalleye Pacific Opah (Lampris incognitus): Found in eastern and central North Pacific Ocean.
- East Atlantic Opah (Lampris lauta): Found in Eastern Atlantic Ocean, including the Mediterranean, Azores and Canary Islands.
- Bigeye Pacific Opah (Lampris megalopsis): Found in the Gulf of Mexico, Indian Ocean, the western Pacific Ocean and Chile.

=== Extinct species ===
- † Lampris zatima, also known as Diatomœca zatima, is a very small, extinct species from the late Miocene of what is now Southern California known primarily from fragmentary fossils, and occasional headless specimens.
- † Megalampris keyesi is an extinct species estimated to be about 4 m (13 ft) in length. Fossil remains date back to the late Oligocene of what is now New Zealand, and it is the first fossil lampridiform found in the Southern Hemisphere.

== Description ==
Opahs are deeply keeled, laterally compressed, discoid fish with conspicuous coloration: the body is a deep red-orange grading to rosy on the belly, with white spots covering the flanks. Both the median and paired fins are a bright vermilion. The large eyes stand out as well, ringed with golden yellow. The body is covered in minute cycloid scales and its silvery, iridescent guanine coating is easily abraded. The snout of the opah is pointed as the lateral line (the sensory system in fish) forms a high arch over the pectoral fins before sweeping down to the caudal peduncle. The Lampris species vary in size. For instance, the larger Lampris species, Lampris guttatus, has a small, terminal, and toothless mouth and can reach a total length of 2 m (6.6 ft) and a weight of 86 kg (190 lb), but has been reported up to 270 kg (600 lb), while the lesser-known Lampris immaculatus reaches a recorded total length of just 1.1 m (3.6 ft).

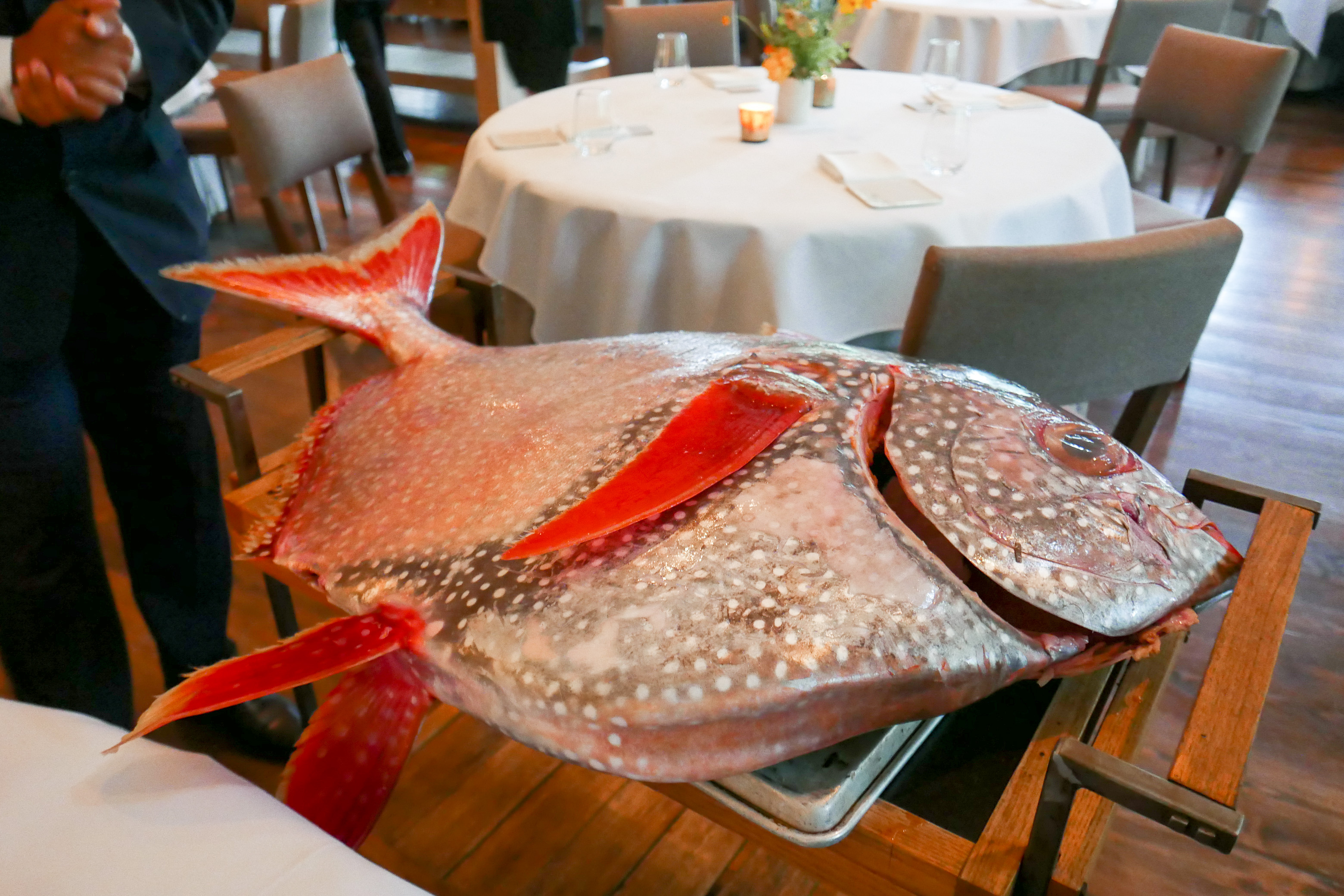
Ventral view of an opah

Opahs closely resemble the shape of the unrelated butterfish (family Stromateidae). Both have falcated (curved) pectoral fins and forked, emarginated (notched) caudal fins. Aside from being significantly larger than butterfish, opahs have enlarged, falcated pelvic fins with about 14 to 17 rays, which distinguish them from superficially similar carangids—positioned thoracically; adult butterfish lack pelvic fins. The pectorals of opahs are also inserted horizontally rather than vertically. The anterior portion of an opah's single dorsal fin (with about 50–55 rays) is greatly elongated, also in a falcated profile similar to the pelvic fins. The anal fin (around 34 to 41 rays) is about as high and as long as the shorter portion of the dorsal fin, and both fins have corresponding grooves into which they can be depressed.

The genome of Lampris megalopsis was analyzed in 2022.

=== Endothermy ===
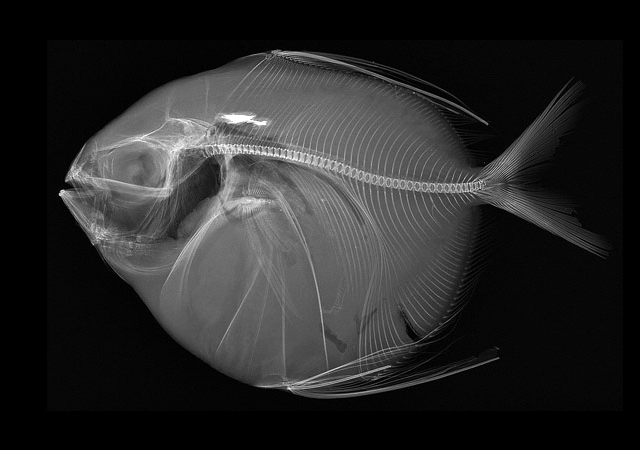
X-ray

Opah fishes use two methods for thermogenesis: pectoral muscle metabolism and specialized tissues in their brain. The opah is the only fish known to exhibit whole body endothermy where all the internal organs are kept at a higher temperature than the surrounding water. This feature allows opahs to maintain an active lifestyle in the cold waters they inhabit. Unlike birds and mammals, the opah is not a homeotherm despite being an endotherm: while its body temperature is raised above the surrounding water temperature, it still varies with the external temperature and is not held constant. In addition to whole body endothermy, the opah also exhibits regional endothermy by raising the temperature of its brain and eyes above that of the rest of the body. Regional endothermy also arose by convergent evolution in tuna, lamnid sharks and billfishes where the swimming muscles and cranial organs are maintained at an elevated temperature compared with the surrounding water.

The large muscles powering the pectoral fins generate most of the heat in the opah. In addition to the heat they generate while moving, these muscles have special regions that can generate additional heat without contracting. The opah has a thick layer of fat that insulates its internal organs and cranium from the surrounding water. However, fat alone is insufficient to retain heat within a fish's body. The gills are the main point of heat loss in fishes as this is where blood from the entire body must continuously be brought in close contact with the surrounding water. Opahs prevent heat loss through their gills using a special structure in the gill blood vessels called the rete mirabile. The rete mirabile is a dense network of blood vessels where the warm blood flowing from the heart to the gills transfers its heat to the cold blood returning from the gills. Hence, the rete mirabile prevents warm blood from coming in contact with the cold water (and losing its heat) and also ensures that the blood returning to the internal organs is warmed up to body temperature. Within the rete, the warm and cold blood flow past each other in opposite directions through thin vessels to maximize the heat transferred. This mechanism is called a counter-current heat exchanger.

In addition to the rete mirabile in its gills, the opah also has a rete in the blood supply to its brain and eyes. This helps to trap heat in the cranium and further raise its temperature above the rest of the body. While the rete mirabile in the gills is unique to the opah, the cranial rete mirabile has also evolved independently in other fishes. Unlike in billfish which have a specialized non-contractile tissue that functions as a brain heater, the opah cranium is heated by the contractions of the large eye muscles.

== Behavior ==
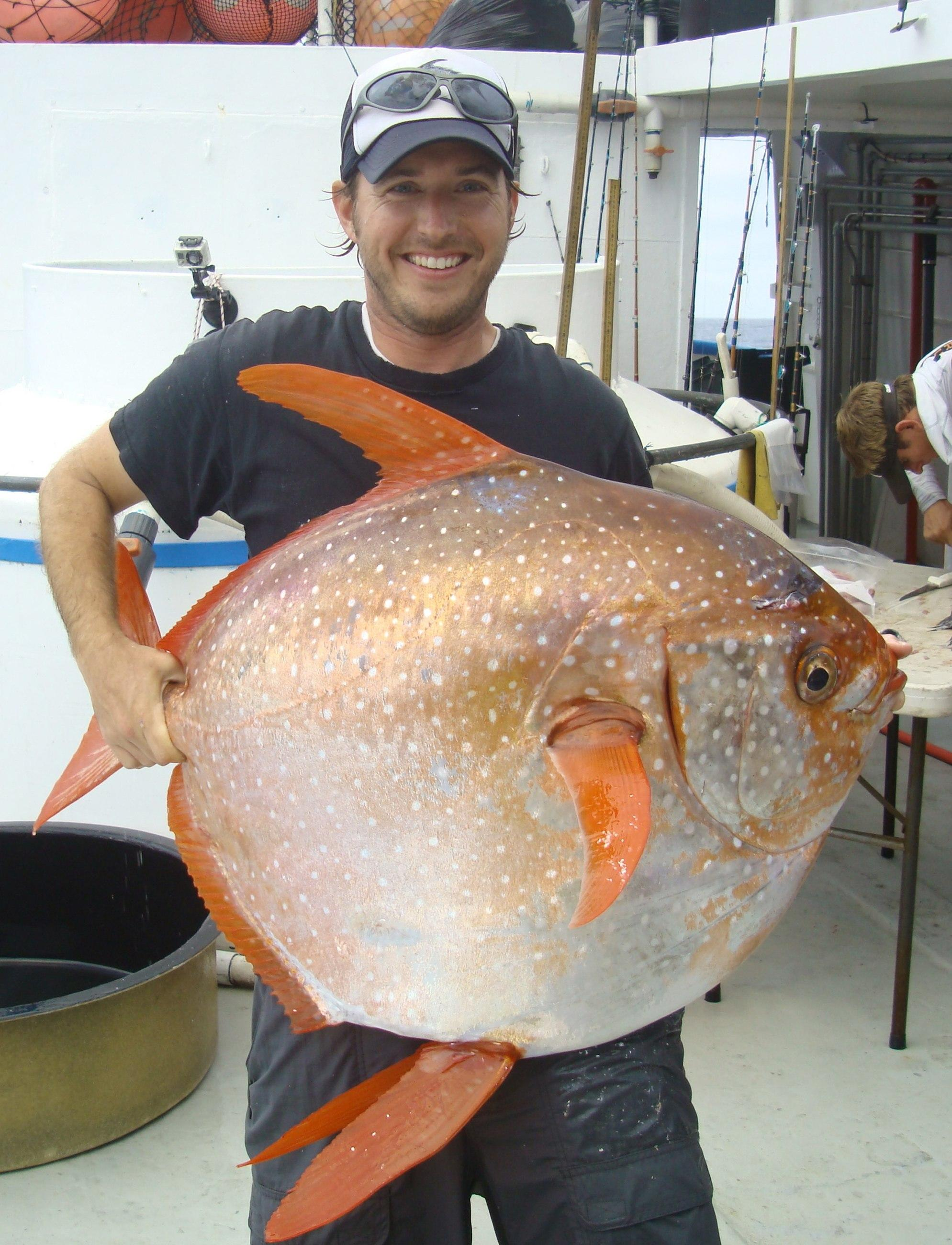
Lampris guttatus

Much research explores the endothermic attributes of the Opah but knowledge is limited to the specific aspects of the Lampris genus, and live specimens are rarely observed. They are presumed to live out their entire lives in the open ocean, at mesopelagic depths of 50 to 500 m (160 to 1,640 ft) with possible forays into the bathypelagic zone. They are apparently solitary, but are known to school with tuna and other scombrids. The fish propel themselves by a lift-based labriform mode of swimming, that is, by flapping their pectoral fins. This, together with their forked caudal fins and depressible median fins, indicates they swim at constantly high speeds like tuna.

The opah can be found worldwide in temperate and tropical oceans. However, their migration is determined by season and temperature. In Diel Vertical Migration opah fishes do not pass 50 meters (160 ft) from the surface, to avoid predation, and they prefer to remain in ocean waters above 7 °C (45 °F). For instance, in the North Pacific, during the day, opah fish can be found in the 100-to-400-meter (330 to 1,310 ft) range that is between 8 and 22 °C (46 and 72 °F); and at night, the fish are restricted to the 50-to-100-meter (160 to 330 ft) range; they rarely surpass a depth of 400 meters.

Lampris guttatus are able to maintain their eyes and brain at 2 °C (3.6 °F) warmer than their bodies, a phenomenon called cranial endothermy and one they share with sharks in the family Lamnidae, billfishes, and some tunas. This may allow their eyes and brains to continue functioning during deep dives into water below 4 °C (39 °F).

Large pelagic sharks, such as great white sharks and mako sharks, are the primary predators of the Opah as shown from archival transmitting tagging operations. The opah fish eats a lot of food, typically, smaller fishes, invertebrates like squid and euphausiids (krill) – that make up the bulk of the opah diet – and large pelagic organisms. Opah fish also carry many parasites such as the tetraphyllidean tapeworm, which has been found in L. guttatus, which may be an intermediate or paratenic host.

The planktonic opah larvae initially resemble those of ribbonfishes (Trachipteridae), but are distinguished by the lack of dorsal and pelvic fin ornamentation. The slender hatchlings later undergo a marked and rapid transformation to a deep-bodied form; this transformation is complete by 10.6 mm (0.42 in) standard length in L. guttatus.
