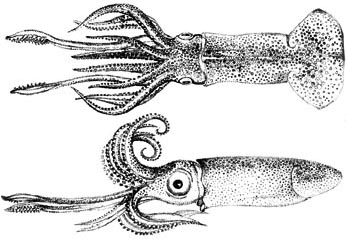
- Onykia carriboea

Scientific classification
- Domain: Eukaryota
- Kingdom: Animalia
- Phylum: Mollusca
- Class: Cephalopoda
- Order: Oegopsida
- Family: Onychoteuthidae
- Genus: Onykia; Lesueur, 1821

Type species
- Onykia carriboea Lesueur, 1821

Species
- see text

Synonyms
- Moroteuthis Verrill, 1881; Moroteuthopsis Pfeffer, 1908; Onychia Latreille, 1825; Steenstrupiola Pfeffer, 1884; Teleoteuthis Verrill, 1882

= Onykia =

Onykia Temporal range: Pliocene - recent

Genus of squids

Onykia is a genus of squids in the family Onychoteuthidae. Due to similarities between the genera, several recent authors consider the genus Moroteuthis a junior synonym of Onykia. The type species is Onykia carriboea, the tropical clubhook squid.

== Species ==
The following are the valid species currently recognised as members of the genus Onkyia by the World Register of Marine Species:

- Onykia aequatorialis (Thiele, 1920)
- Onykia carriboea Lesueur, 1821
- Onykia indica Okutani, 1981
- Onykia ingens (E. A. Smith, 1881)
- Onykia loennbergii (Ishikawa & Wakiya, 1914)
- Onykia robsoni (Adam, 1962)
- Onykia robusta (Verrill, 1876)
