= Onychoteuthis horstkottei =

Scientific classification
- Kingdom: Animalia
- Phylum: Mollusca
- Class: Cephalopoda
- Order: Oegopsida
- Family: Onychoteuthidae
- Genus: Onychoteuthis
- Species: O. horstkottei

Binomial name
- Onychoteuthis horstkottei Bolstad, 2010

Species of squid

Onychoteuthis horstkottei is a species of squid in the family Onychoteuthidae. The species is endemic to the Pacific Ocean.
