= Notonykia africanae =

Conservation status
- Data Deficient (IUCN 3.1)

Scientific classification
- Kingdom: Animalia
- Phylum: Mollusca
- Class: Cephalopoda
- Order: Oegopsida
- Family: Onychoteuthidae
- Genus: Notonykia
- Species: N. africanae

Binomial name
- Notonykia africanae Nesis, Roeleveld & Nikitina, 1998

Species of squid

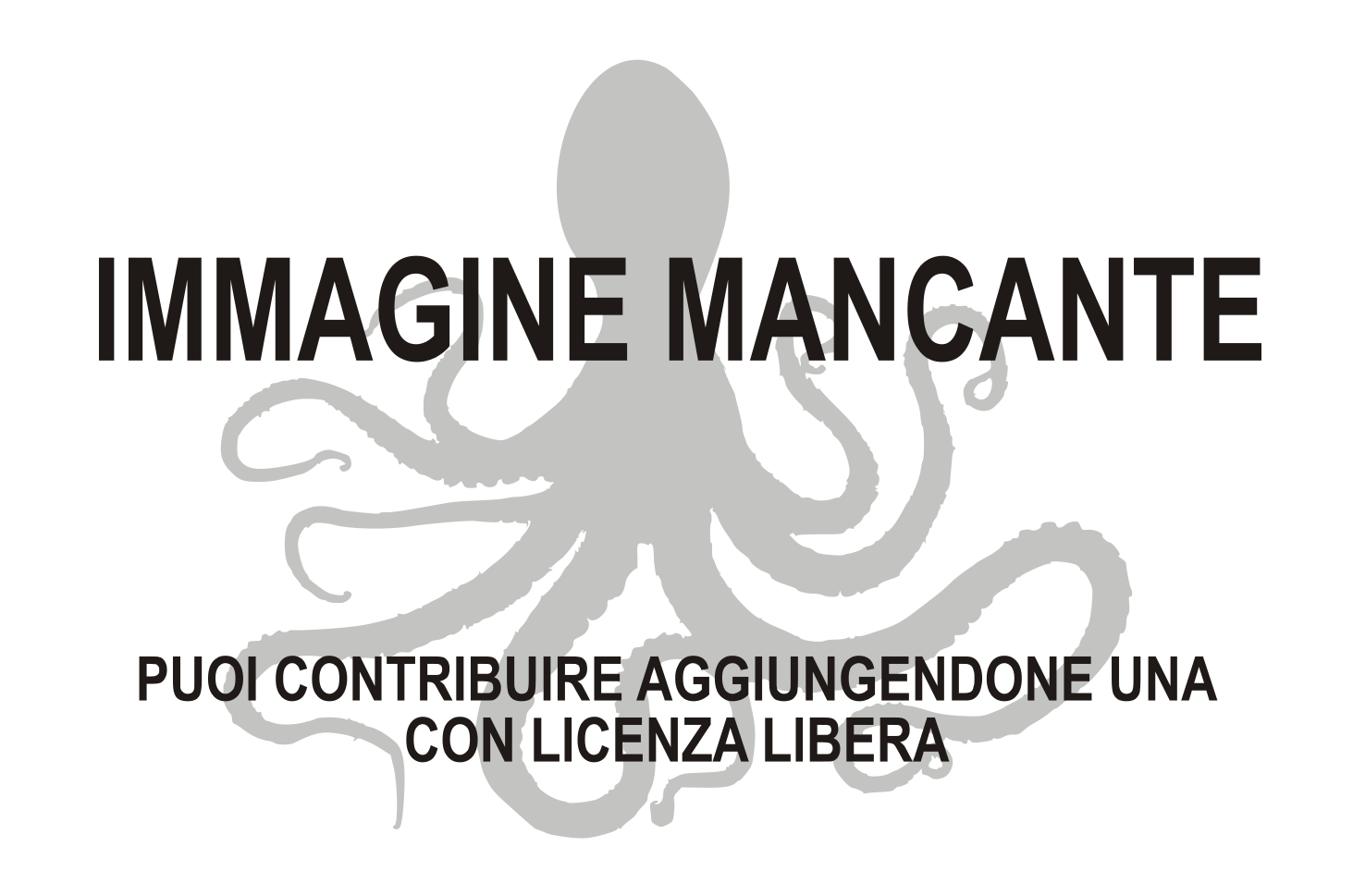

Notonykia africanae, the African clubhook-squid, is a species of squid in the family Onychoteuthidae. It is the type species of the genus Notonykia. While the mature size of the species is unknown, it is known to reach a mantle length of at least 180 mm. Tentacles reach approximately 70% of the mantle length, and contain 14–20 club hooks. Arms are known to reach 27–45% (arm I) and 33–55% (arms II-IV) of the mantle length; each containing 50–60 suckers. The species is located in southern waters off Australia, Tasmania, New Zealand and South Africa.
