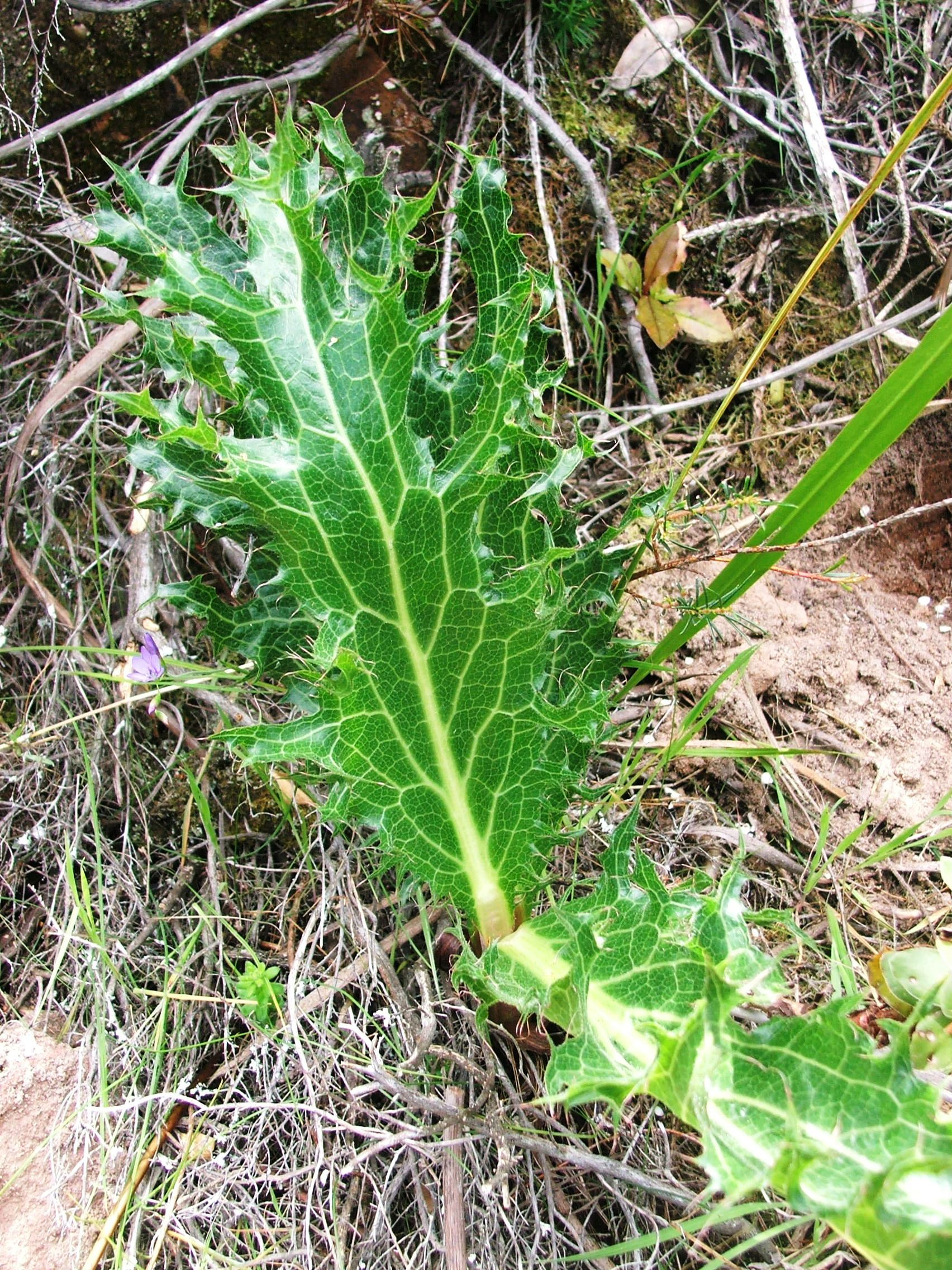
- Lichtensteinia lacera, from Cape Fynbos, Cape Town

Scientific classification
- Kingdom: Plantae
- Clade: Tracheophytes
- Clade: Angiosperms
- Clade: Eudicots
- Clade: Asterids
- Order: Apiales
- Family: Apiaceae
- Subfamily: Apioideae
- Tribe: Lichtensteinieae; Magee, C.I.Calviño, M.Liu, S.R.Downie, Tilney & B.-E.van Wyk
- Genus: Lichtensteinia; Cham. & Schltdl.

Type species
- Lichtensteinia lacera Cham. & Schltdl.

= Lichtensteinia (plant) =

Genus of flowering plant

Lichtensteinia is a genus of flowering plants belonging to the family Apiaceae. It is also the only genus in the tribe Lichtensteinieae, subfamily Apioideae.

It is native to the Cape Provinces and KwaZulu-Natal (within South Africa).

The genus name of Lichtensteinia is in honour of Hinrich Lichtenstein (1780–1857), a German physician, explorer, botanist and zoologist. It was first described and published in Linnaea Vol.1 on page 394 in 1826.

== Known species ==
According to Kew:

- Lichtensteinia crassijuga E.Mey. ex Sond.
- Lichtensteinia globosa B.-E.van Wyk & Tilney
- Lichtensteinia interrupta (Thunb.) E.Mey. ex Sond.
- Lichtensteinia lacera Cham. & Schltdl.
- Lichtensteinia latifolia Eckl. & Zeyh.
- Lichtensteinia obscura (Spreng.) Koso-Pol.
- Lichtensteinia trifida Cham. & Schltdl.
