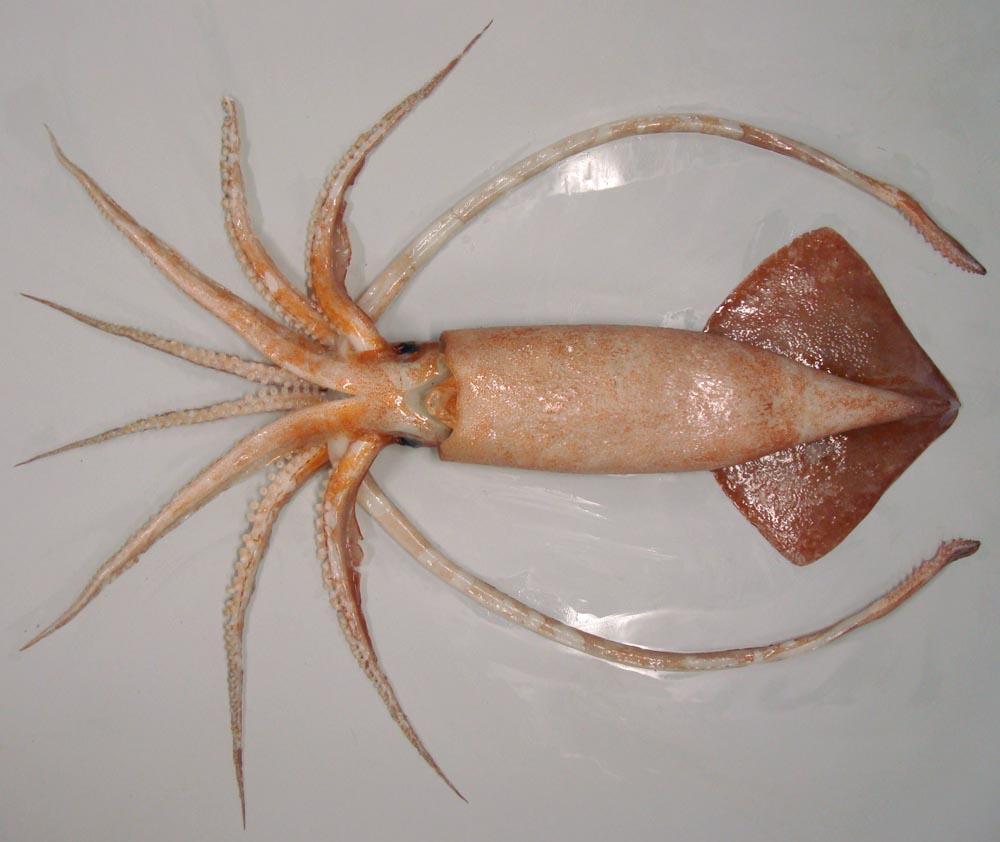
- Mature female (384 mm (15.1 inches) ML, 1.875 kg (4.13 lb) weight) from the Chatham Rise
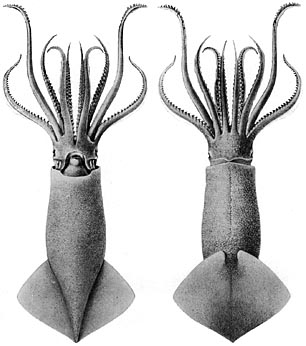
- ~400 mm ML

Conservation status
- Least Concern (IUCN 3.1)

Scientific classification
- Kingdom: Animalia
- Phylum: Mollusca
- Class: Cephalopoda
- Order: Oegopsida
- Family: Onychoteuthidae
- Genus: Moroteuthopsis
- Species: M. ingens

Binomial name
- Moroteuthopsis ingens (Smith, 1881)

Synonyms
- Onychoteuthis ingens Smith, 1881; Moroteuthis ingens (Smith, 1881); Onykia ingens(Smith, 1881)

= Moroteuthopsis ingens =

Greater hooked squid

Species of squid

Moroteuthopsis ingens, the greater hooked squid, is a species of squid in the family Onychoteuthidae. It occurs worldwide in subantarctic oceans.

== Taxonomy ==
M. ingens was long attributed to the genus Moroteuthis, which became a junior synonym of Onykia in 2010; this species was subsequently lumped into that genus, though it was separated from all other Onykia spp. into its own subgenus; Moroteuthopsis. A 2018 study of mitochondrial DNA of the family Onychoteuthidae subsequently found that the subgenus Moroteuthopsis was deemed distinct from the rest of Onykia, and furthermore, this species formed a monophyletic clade with Kondakovia longimana. Thus, it was decided to elevate subgenus Moroteuthopsis into a full genus, and this species became its type species by seniority, with "K." longimana becoming the second species in Moroteuthopsis.

== Biology ==
=== Size and growth ===
The size of a fully grown M. ingens including the clubbed tentacles is currently unknown. Many estimates, however, predict that the mantle may reach lengths of up to 94 cm (37 in). Research has found that egg sizes of the squid average 2.1 mm inside mature females, while juveniles average 4.6 mm (0.18 in) or larger. Juveniles are presumed to live near the surface, until they reach a mantle length of approximately 200 mm (7.9 in), at which time they relocate to deeper water, and larger prey. M. ingens exhibit sexual dimorphism, with females growing linearly twice as fast as males, and reaching a fully mature weight of more than five times that of male counterparts.

Penis elongation has been observed in this species; when erect, the penis may be as long as the mantle, head and arms combined. As such, deep water squid like M. ingens have the greatest known penis length relative to body size of all mobile animals, second in the entire animal kingdom only to certain sessile barnacles.

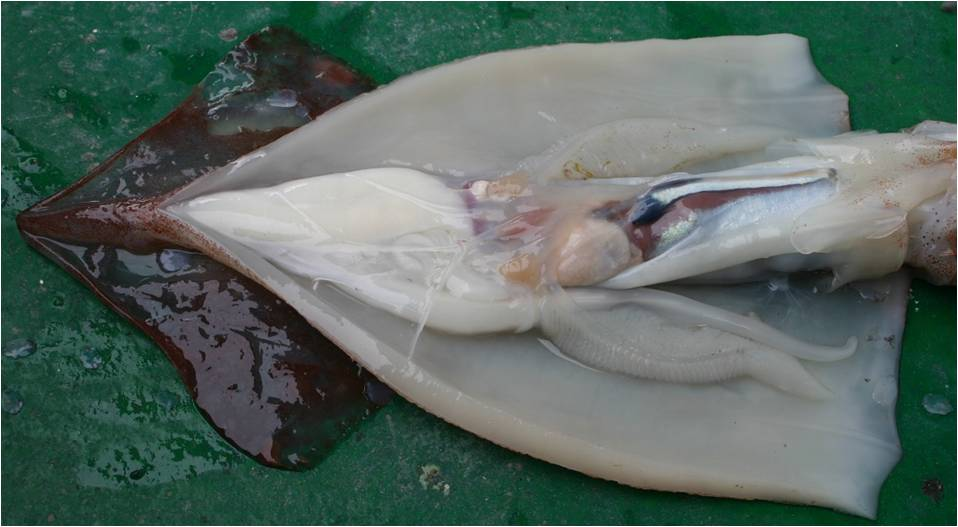
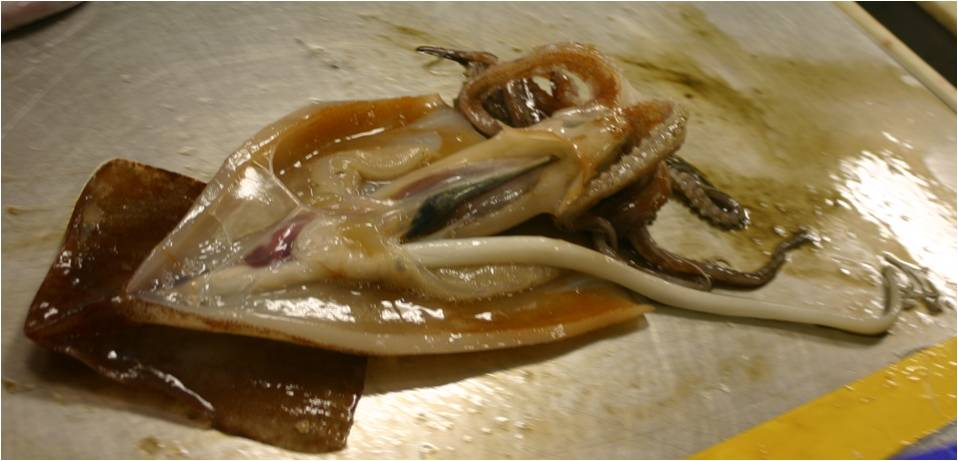
Left: A dissected male specimen of Moroteuthopsis ingens, showing a non-erect penis (the white tubular structure located below most of the other organs)
Right: A specimen of the same species exhibiting elongation of the penis to 67 cm (26 in) in length

=== Ecology ===
It is generally accepted that there are large dietary variations between large and small M. ingens. One of the most common findings is that juvenile squid (>200 mm ML) consume a greater percentage of crustaceans and cephalopods compared to their size than mature squid, which consume a large percentage of fish and virtually no crustaceans. Myctophid lantern fish are seen as common prey, globally. Larger squid are known to practice cannibalism (accounting for up to 6% of diet).

M. ingens, as with many (if not all) large squid, has a number of predators. These include the patagonian toothfish, king penguin, wandering albatross, pilot whale, bottlenose whale, dwarf sperm whale, sperm whale, and other types of squid. Other predators include Antarctic and Subantarctic fur seals.

Tentacular club of Moroteuthopsis ingens

Piece of ventral mantle skin

Gladius with cross-sections
