= Walvisteuthis rancureli =

Conservation status
- Data Deficient (IUCN 3.1)

Scientific classification
- Kingdom: Animalia
- Phylum: Mollusca
- Class: Cephalopoda
- Order: Oegopsida
- Family: Onychoteuthidae
- Genus: Walvisteuthis
- Species: W. rancureli

Binomial name
- Walvisteuthis rancureli (Okutani, 1981)

Species of squid

Walvisteuthis rancureli is a species of squid from the family Onychoteuthidae. The species can be found in the Eastern Central Atlantic and Eastern Indian oceans, and members of the species are gonochoric.
