= Adolf Appellöf =

Swedish marine zoologist

Jakob Johan Adolf Appellöf
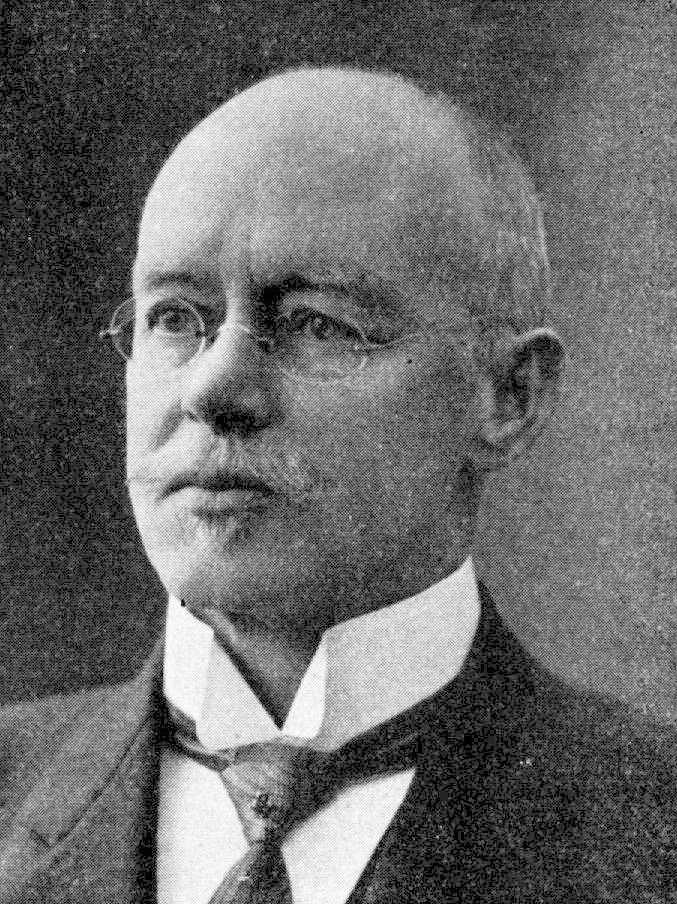
- Born: 2 November 1857; Garda on Gotland, Sweden
- Died: 5 January 1921 (aged 63); Uppsala, Sweden
- Education: Uppsala University (PhD 1886)
- Known for: Contributions to knowledge of cephalopods
- Scientific career
- Fields: Marine biology
- Institutions: University Museum of Bergen; Uppsala University
- Patrons: Bünsow (sawmill magnate)
- Author abbrev. (zoology): Appellöf

Jakob Johan Adolf Appellöf (Garda on Gotland 2 November 1857 – Uppsala 5 January 1921) was a Swedish marine zoologist.

Appellöf matriculated at Uppsala University in 1877, earned his PhD in 1886 and became a docent of zoology in 1887. In 1889 he received the position of conservator at the University Museum of Bergen. He was appointed professor of comparative anatomy in Uppsala in 1910. With a donation from the sawmill magnate Bünsow, Appellöf established the Klubban Biological Station of Uppsala University, a station for the study of marine biology located on the west coast of Sweden. In 1919 he was elected a member of the Royal Swedish Academy of Sciences and in 1920 of the Royal Society of Sciences in Uppsala.

He made several important contributions to the knowledge of cephalopods.

== Partial bibliography ==
- "Die schalen von Sepia, Spirula und Nautilus, Studien über ihren Bau und Wachsthum" (in: Kungl. Svenska vetenskapsakademiens handlingar, [ISSN 0023-5377]; N.F., 25:7)
- "Teuthologische beiträge", 1–4 (1889–1892, in: Bergens museums aarsberetning och aarbog)
- "Cephalopoden von Ternate" (in: Abhandlung der Senckenbergischen naturforschenden Gesellschaft, Bd 24, H. 4, 1898)
- "Über das vorkommen innerer Schalen bei Octopoda" (in: Bergens Museums Aarbog 1899).
- "Über einige Resultate der Kreuzbefruchtung bei Knochenfischen" (Bergens Museums Aarbog, 1894–95)
- "Zur Kenntnis der Edvardsien" (Bergens Museums Aarbog, 1891)
- "Studien über Actinien-Entwicklung" (Bergens Museums Aarbog, 1900. N:o 1, 1900).
- "Untersuchungen über den Hummer: mit besonderer Berücksichtigung seines Auftretens an den Norwegischen Küsten" (in: Bergens Museums Skrifter, [ISSN 0365-981X]; 8; N.R., 1:1, 1909; awarded the Joachim Friele Gold Medal).
