= Yaichirō Okada =

Japanese zoologist

Yaichirō Okada (岡田 彌一郎, Okada Yaichirō; June 24, 1892 – April 28, 1976) was a Japanese zoologist. He was born in Ishikawa Prefecture.

Okada studied at the Imperial Fisheries Institute (now Tokyo University of Marine Science and Technology). He was a professor at Tokyo Higher Normal School (now University of Tsukuba), and after World War II he taught at Mie University from 1950, where he was dean of Fisheries. After retirement he served as a professor at Tokai University.

As a zoologist, has contributed in the field of fish taxonomy, as well as reptiles and amphibians. Okada's primary work in English was Fishes of Japan, which published in 1955 by Maruzen and subsequently issued in revised editions.
