= Nuchal crest (cephalopod) =

The nuchal crest in cephalopods is a prominent transverse ridge that extends across the dorsal surface of the head and on to the lateral surfaces at its posterior end. It is often joined at the posterior end to fixed folds of the head integument which are perpendicular to the nuchal crest; these are known as nuchal folds. It is also known as the occipital crest and the folds as occipital folds.
