= Hinrich Lichtenstein =

German physician, explorer, botanist and zoologist

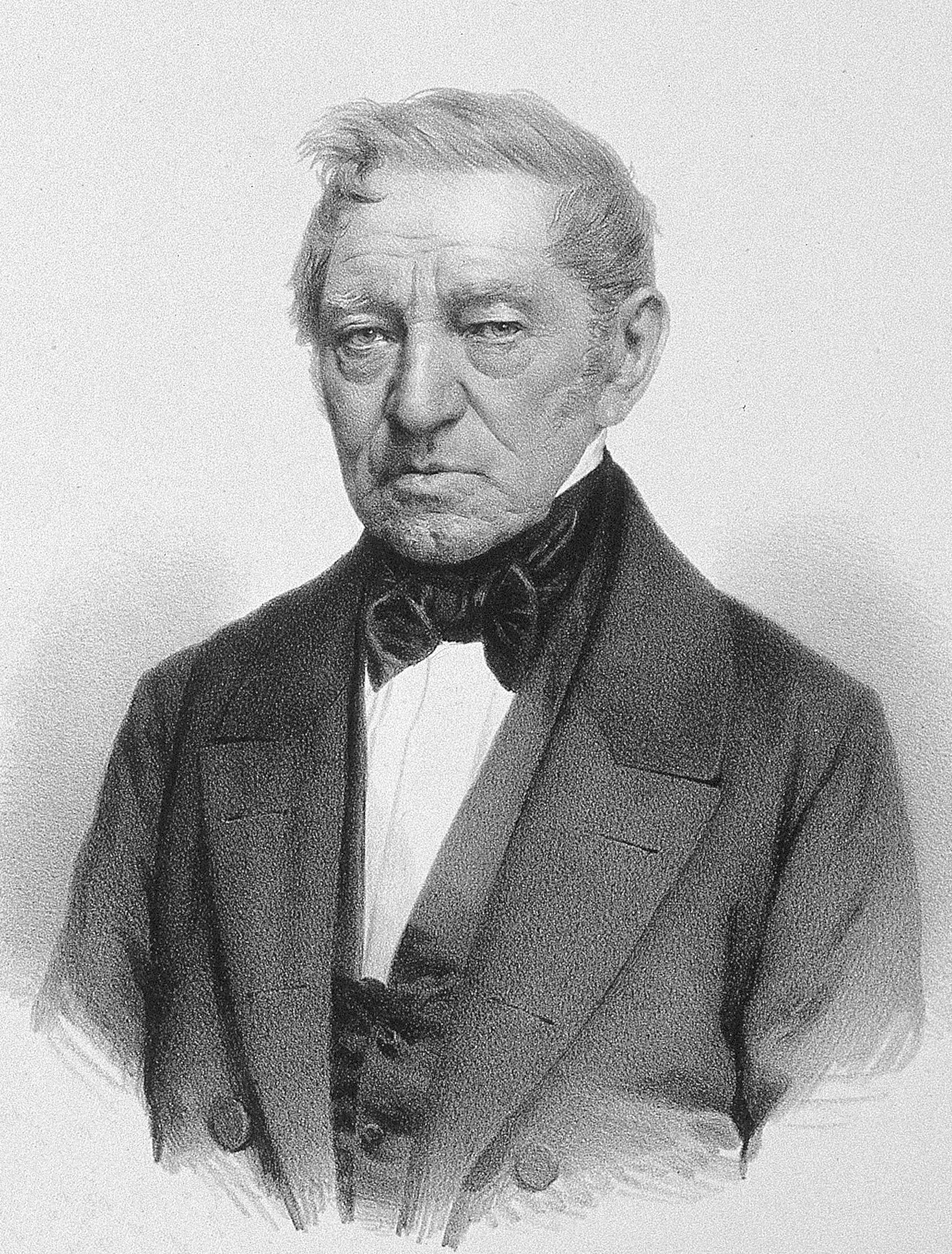
- Born: Hinrich Lichtenstein; 10 January 1780; Hamburg
- Died: 2 September 1857 (aged 77); At sea
- Scientific career
- Author abbrev. (zoology): Lichtenstein

Martin Hinrich Carl Lichtenstein (10 January 1780 – 2 September 1857) was a German medical doctor, explorer, botanist and zoologist. He explored parts of southern Africa and collected natural history specimens extensively and many new species were described from his collections by European scientists.

== Biography ==
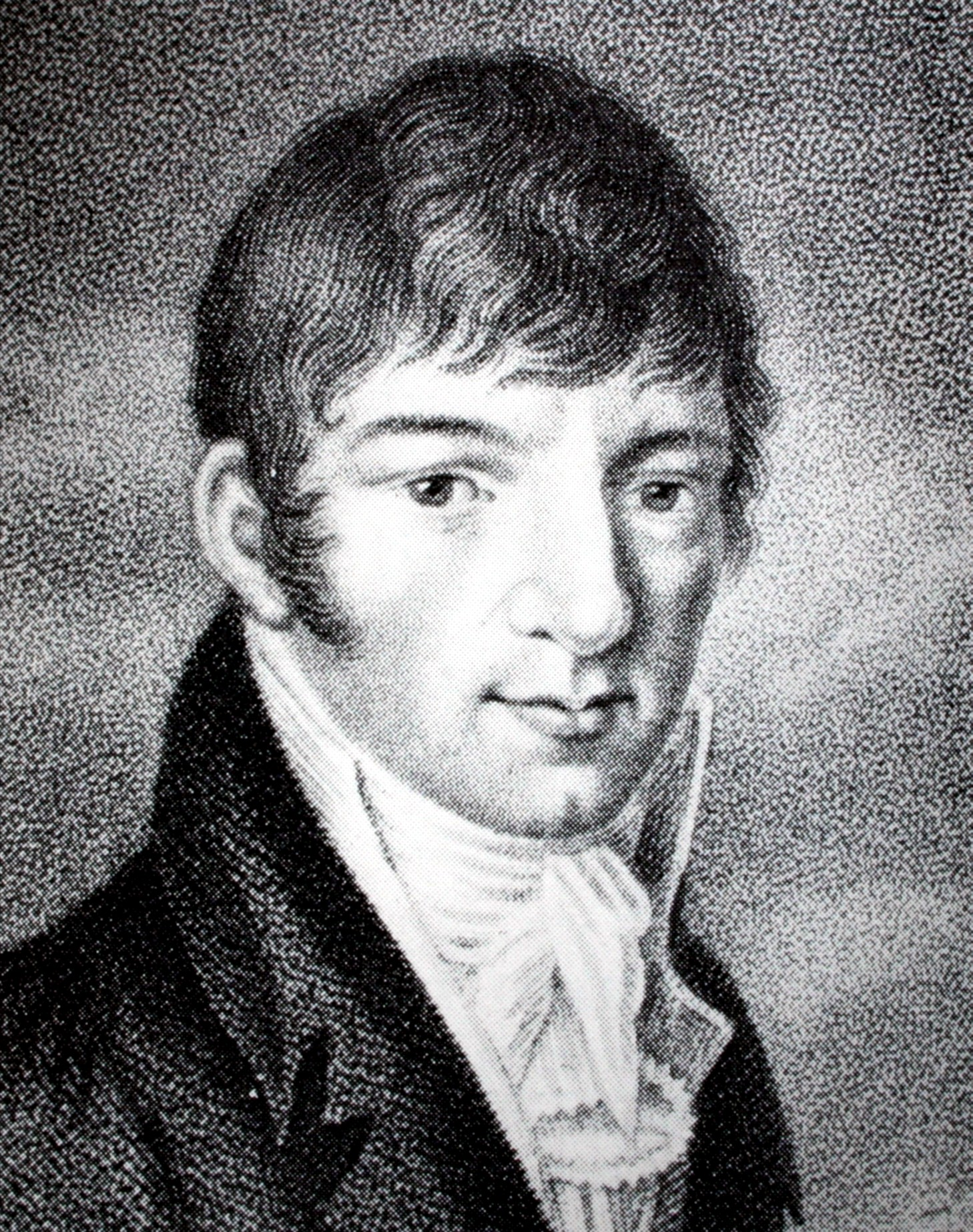
Hinrich Lichtenstein c. 1806

Born in Hamburg, Lichtenstein was the son of Anton August Heinrich Lichtenstein, head of the Johanneum. His father had an interest in eastern languages and built up an extensive library. He took an interest in natural history and geography from an early age, and came into contact with Count Johann Centurius Hoffmannsegg in 1797 and began to help examine the Count's extensive collections of insects and birds. He then went to study medicine at Jena and Helmstedt and qualified as a doctor on 26 April 1802. He then chose to travel and found work when the Dutch governor of the Cape Colony, General Jan Willem Janssens hired Lichtenstein as a family physician and tutor for his son. Lichtenstein prepared himself by reading the accounts of travellers like Peter Kolbe, Anders Sparrman, Carl Peter Thunberg, François Le Vaillant and John Barrow. He also met the collectors Johann Hellwig and Johann Karl Wilhelm Illiger who gave him an overview of the gaps in the knowledge of the flora and fauna of the African region and on methods for collecting specimens. He reached Cape Town on 23 December 1802 and from that point he traveled widely around southern Africa. When war broke out against England, he joined the Dutch army as a major surgeon. After the English conquered the colony, he returned to Germany.

In 1811 he published Reisen im südlichen Afrika : in den Jahren 1803, 1804, 1805, und 1806; as a result, he was appointed professor of zoology at the University of Berlin in 1811, and appointed director of the Berlin Zoological Museum in 1813. His collections of plants from Africa was examined in Germany by Carl Willdenow. He travelled to London in 1819 to purchase specimens for the Berlin Museum at auctions.

Lichtenstein was a close friend of Carl Maria von Weber. After his death, in 1826, together with the banker Wilhelm Beer, he arranged for the sale of the score of Oberon to the Berlin music publisher Adolf Martin Schlesinger on behalf of Weber's widow Caroline. As guardian together with Carl Theodor Winkler, he participated in the education of Weber's orphaned sons Max Maria and Alexander.

Together with Alexander von Humboldt, Lichtenstein organized the annual meeting of the Society of German Natural Scientists and Physicians in Berlin in 1828. In 1829, Lichtenstein was elected a foreign member of the Royal Swedish Academy of Sciences. He was also appointed Privy Councillor in Berlin.

He died from a stroke at sea while aboard a steamer from Korsør to Kiel.

== Legacy ==
Lichtenstein was responsible for the creation of Berlin's Zoological Gardens in 1841, when he persuaded King Frederick William IV of Prussia to donate the grounds of his pheasantry. He also published Johann Reinhold Forster's manuscripts for Descriptiones animalium in 1844.

In the field of herpetology he described many new species of amphibians and reptiles.

Among species named by Lichtenstein are the Australian king parrot (Alisterus scapularis), the crowned sandgrouse (Pterocles coronatus), and the Cape night adder (Causus rhombeatus).

In 1826, botanists Cham. & Schltdl. published a genus of flowering plants from South Africa, belonging to the family Apiaceae as Lichtensteinia in his honour. A genus Lichtensteinia was also erected by Carl Willdenow but this is a rejected name.

In 1856 Johann Jakob Kaup named the seahorse Hippocampus lichtensteinii after him.

Then in 1859 Italian herpetologist, Giorgio Jan, named the forest night adder (Causus lichtensteinii) in his honor of Hinrich Lichtenstein, as did the Dutch zoologist Coenraad Jacob Temminck with Lichtenstein's sandgrouse (Pterocles lichtensteinii ).

== Writings ==
Lichtenstein's Reisen im südlichen Afrika in den Jahren 1803, 1804, 1805 und 1806 was translated into English by Anne Plumptre, and published in 1812 as "Travels in Southern Africa in the years 1803, 1804, 1805 and 1806".

- Reisen im südlichen Afrika. 1803–1806. Mit einer Einführung von Wahrhold Drascher. 1811. 2 Bände (Neudruck: Brockhaus Antiquarium, Stuttgart 1967).
- Nachrichten von Teneriffa. Ein Fragment aus dem Tagebuche des Hrn. Dr. Lichtenstein auf der Reise von Amsterdam nach dem Vorgebirge der guten Hofnung 1802. Industrie-Comptoirs, Weimar 1806
- Über die Beetjuanas. Als Nachtrag und Berichtigung zu Barrows Auszug aus Trüters Tagebuch einer Reise zu den Buschwanas. Vom Hrn. Dr. Hinrich Lichtenstein. Industrie-Comptoirs, Weimar 1807
- Darstellung neuer oder wenig bekannter Säugethiere in Abbildungen und Beschreibungen von 65 Arten auf 50 colorirten Steindrucktafeln, nach den Originalen des Zoologischen Museums der Universität Berlin. Lüderitz, Berlin 1827/34. Text Plates
- Zur Geschichte der Sing-Akademie in Berlin. Nebst einer Nachricht über das Fest am funfzigsten Jahrestage Ihrer Stiftung und einem alphabetischen Verzeichniss aller Personen, die ihr als Mitglieder angehört haben. Verlag Trautwein, Berlin 1843.

== Literature ==
- Ernst Rudorff (Hrsg.): Briefe von Carl Maria von Weber an Hinrich Lichtenstein. Mit drei Porträts, drei Abbildungen und sechs Faksimiles. George Westermann, Braunschweig 1900. VIII Seiten, 252 Seiten, mit Abb.
- Wilhelm Bölsche (Hrsg.): Neue Welten. Die Eroberung der Erde in Darstellungen großer Naturforscher. Anthologie mit Texten von Georg Forster, Hinrich Lichtenstein, Karl von den Steinen, Ferdinand von Hochstetter, Alfred Russel Wallace, Adelbert von Chamisso, Alexander von Humboldt und Charles Darwin – jeweils mit Einleitung von Wilhelm Bölsche. EA. Deutsche Bibliothek, Berlin 1917. XXIV, 644 S., 1 Bl. Mit 24 Tafeln.
- F. D. Steinheimer, "Martin Hinrich Carl Lichtenstein and his ornithological purchases at the auction of William Bullock's museum in 1819". Archives of Natural History, Volume 35 Issue 1 (2008), Page 88–99, ISSN 0260-9541.

== Other sources ==
- Gilman, D. C.; Peck, H. T.; Colby, F. M., eds. (1905). "Lichtenstein, Martin Heinrich Karl" . New International Encyclopedia (1st ed.). New York: Dodd, Mead.
- Hess, W. (1883). "Lichtenstein, Martin" (in German). Bayerische Staatsbibliothek.
