= Danata Formation =

Marine geological formation in western Turkmenistan

- Stratigraphic range: Early Eocene-Mid Eocene; ~56–45 Ma
- Type: Geological formation

Location
- Coordinates: 38°38′N 55°48′E
- Approximate paleocoordinates: 35.1°N 51.2°E
- Country: Turkmenistan
- Danata Formation (Turkmenistan)

The Danata Formation (or Danatinskaya, Danatinsk, Russian: Danata Svita) is an earliest Eocene to Middle Eocene sedimentary succession located in Turkmenistan. It is mostly famous for its fish-bearing horizons (Ichthyofauna). The formation for example crops out in the Kopet Dag mountain range in the border region of Turkmenistan and Iran. It was deposited in a far northeastern arm of the Tethys Sea.

Previously, it was thought that the earliest horizons of this formation dated to the latest Paleocene (Thanetian). However, more recent studies have found the formation's sapropel to originate from a global anoxic event caused by the Paleocene-Eocene Thermal Maximum, indicating that it formed just after the Paleocene-Eocene boundary, during the earliest Ypresian.

== Paleoenvironment ==
The Danata Formation is famous for its ichthyofauna. The fish are found in a 9 metres (30 ft) thick clay horizon in the middle of the succession, that has been dated as earliest Ypresian, around 56 million years ago. This includes fossils of the family Turkmenidae. Luvarus necopinatus was first described in this formation. Other fossils of fish include the genera Eospinus, Danatinia, Exellia, Turkmene and Avitoluvarus. The snake species Archaeophis turkmenicus has also been described. A similar fauna occurs in the Moler Formation in Denmark. The majority of these taxa were named by prominent Russian ichthyologist Pavel Daniltshenko.

The fauna is largely dominated by three species: Primisardinella genetrix, Chanos torosus, and Mene triangulum. The formation appears to have been deposited in an open-water environment as the vast majority of genera had a pelagic lifestyle, with only two very rare benthic genera (Eolamprogrammus and Asanoa) known. Despite some of the similarities in the taxonomic affiliation of the Danata ichthyofauna with modern-day marine ichthyofauna, only five to six genera represented in the formation (Chanos, Seriola, Luvarus, Mene, Scomberomorus, and possibly Caesio) also have modern representatives. Uniquely, a high diversity of luvarid fishes is known from the formation, despite this family being represented by a single, very rare species (the louvar) in the modern day.

== Paleobiota ==
The following taxa are known:

=== Bony fish ===
Genus	Species	Notes	Image
Archaeus	A. oblongus	A carangid.	
Argestichthys	A. vysotzkyi	A gempylid.	
Asanoa	A. kushlukensis	A snake eel.	
Asianthus	A. celebratus (=Serranus celebratus)	A perciform of uncertain affinities.	
Auxides	A. turkmenicus	A scombrid.	
Avitoluvarus	A. dianae	A luvarid.	
Avitoluvarus	A. mariannae	A luvarid.	
Blochiidae indet.		A blochiid billfish.	
?Caesio	?C. breviuscula	A fusilier.	
Chanos	C. torosus	A relative of milkfish.	
Danatinia	D. casca	A turkmenid lamprimoph.	
Eocoelopoma	E. portentosa	A scombrid.	
Eolamprogrammus	E. senectus	A viviparous brotula.	
Eospinus	E. daniltshenkoi	A bolcabalistid tetraodontiform.	
?Epigonus	?E. sp.	A deepwater cardinalfish.	
Exellia	E. proxima	An exelliid percomorph.	
Georgidens	G. nikolskii	A georgidentid eel.	
Goodya	G. danatensis	A halecid aulopiform.	
Hemingwaya	H. sarissa	A hemingwayid billfish.	
Idrissia	I. turkmenica	A stomiiform of uncertain affinities.	
Kushlukia	K. permira	A kushlukiid acanthuriform.	
Luvarus	L. necopinatus	A relative of the louvar.	
Mene	M. triangulum	A moonfish.	
Neocassandra	N. mica	A blackchin.	
Opsithrissops	O. osseus	A bonytongue.	
Palaeothunnus	P. parvidentatus	A scombrid.	
Palimphyes	P. palaeocenicus	A euzaphlegid.	
Pauranthus	P. argutulus	A perciform of uncertain affinities.	
Platinx	P. cognitus	A late-surviving pachyrhizodontid crossognathiform.	
Primisardinella	P. genetrix	A clupeid.	
Protorhamphosus	P. parvulus	A macroramphosid.	
Pycnodontiformes indet.		A pycnodont.	
Scomberomorus	S. avitus	A Spanish mackerel.	
Scombrosarda	S. turkmenica	A scombrid.	
Seriola	S. paleocenica	A relative of amberjacks.	
Siganopygaeus	S. rarus	A relative of rabbitfish.	
Trachicaranx	T. tersus (=Uylyaichthys eugeniae)	An apolectid carangiform.	
Turkmene	T. finitimus	A turkmenid lamprimoph.	
Urosphenopsis	U. sagitta	A urosphenid syngnathiform.	
Uylyakushlyukia	U. danatensis	A stromateoid	

=== Reptiles ===
Genus	Species	Notes	Image
"Archaeophis"	"A." turkmenicus	A palaeophiid snake. Assignment to Archaeophis disputed.	
