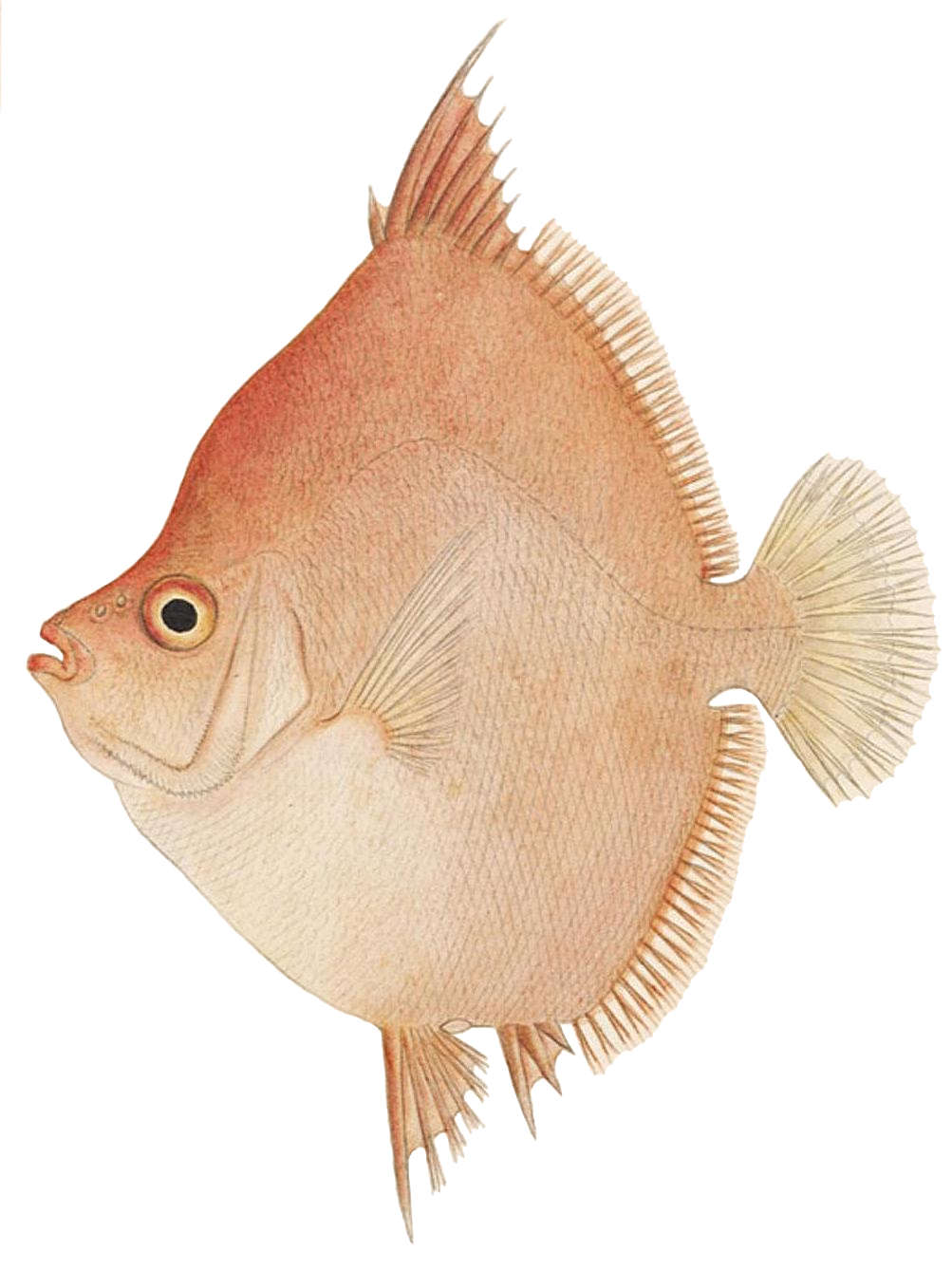

Scientific classification
- Kingdom: Animalia
- Phylum: Chordata
- Class: Actinopterygii
- Order: Acanthuriformes
- Family: Antigoniidae
- Genus: Antigonia
- Species: A. rubescens

Binomial name
- Antigonia rubescens (Günther, 1860)

Synonyms
- Hypsinotus rubescens Günther, 1860; Hypsinotus benhalatate Bleeker, 1853; Antigonia fowleri Franz, 1910

= Antigonia rubescens =

Species of marine fish

Antigonia rubescens, the Indo-Pacific boarfish or sharpsnout deepsea boarfish, is a species of marine ray-finned fish belonging to the family Caproidae, the boarfishes. This fish is found in the Indo-West Pacific region.

== Taxonomy ==
Antigonia rubescens was first formally described as Hypsinotus rubescens in 1860 by the German-born British herpetologist and ichthyologist Albert Günther with its type locality given as Nagasaki. The 5th edition of Fishes of the World classifies the genus Antigonia in the Antigoniinae, a subfamily of the Caproidae, within the order Caproiformes, as do other authorities. However, other authorities classify this taxon as a family, the Antigoniidae, and classify and the Caproidae in the order Acanthuriformes.

== Etymology ==
Antigonia rubescens has the genus name, Antigonia, and this was not explained by Lowe but it is probably a combination of anti, meaning "against", and goneos, which means "ancestor". This may be reference to how A. capros is so distinctive yet seems to elucidate the ancestry of relayed forms which Lowe felt were randomly classified before he described A. capros. The specific name, rubescens, means "reddish", Günther did not explain this but it is obviouslt a reference to the redish orange colour of this fish .

== Description ==
Antigonia rubescens has 9 spines and between 27 and 30 soft rays supporting the dorsal fin and 3 spines and between 24 and 28 soft rays supporting the anal fin. They have a highly compressed, deep rhomboid shaped body, typical of the genus Antigomia. The overall colour of the body is reddish orange. This species has a maximum published standard length of 15 cm (5.9 in).

== Distribution and habitat ==
Antigonia rubescens is found in the Indo-West Pacific from Japan to Australia. It is a benthopelagic fish found at depths between 50 and 750 m (160 and 2,460 ft).
