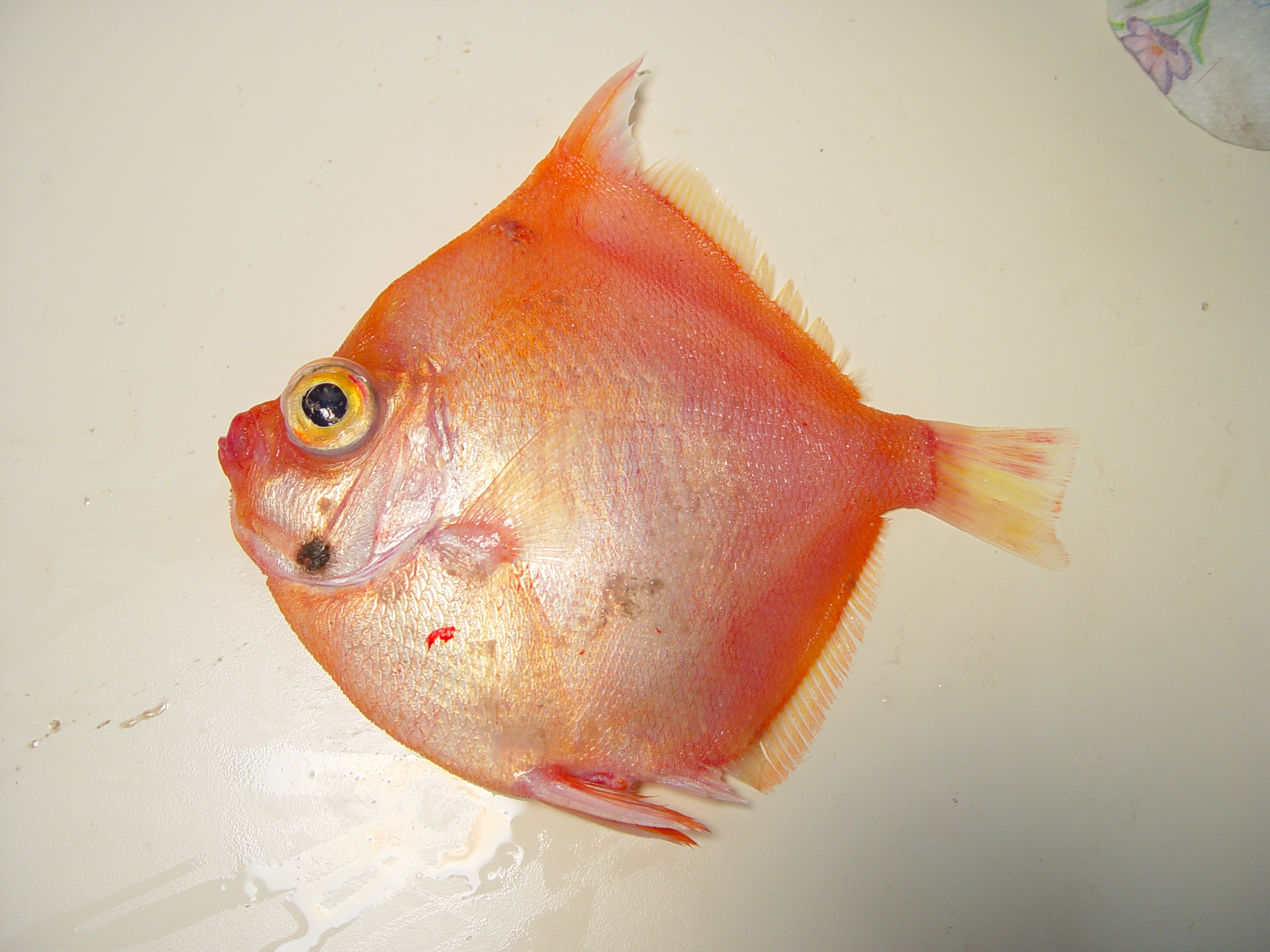

Conservation status
- Least Concern (IUCN 3.1)

Scientific classification
- Kingdom: Animalia
- Phylum: Chordata
- Class: Actinopterygii
- Order: Acanthuriformes
- Family: Antigoniidae
- Genus: Antigonia
- Species: A. capros

Binomial name
- Antigonia capros R. T. Lowe, 1843

Synonyms
- Caprophonus aurora Müller & Troschel, 1848; Antigonia steindachneri Jordan & Evermann, 1902; Antigonia browni Fowler, 1934

= Deepbody boarfish =

Species of fish

The deepbody boarfish (Antigonia capros), or robust deepsea boarfish, is a species of marine ray-finned fish belonging to the family Caproidae, the boarfishes. This fish is found in the warmer waters of the Atlantic, Indian and Pacific Oceans.

== Taxonomy ==
The deepbody boarfish was first formally described in 1843 by the English zoologist Richard Thomas Lowe with its type locality given as Madeira. When he described this species Lowe classified it in the new monospecific genus Antigonia. The 5th edition of Fishes of the World classifies the genus Antigonia in the Antigoniinae, a subfamily of the Caproidae, within the order Caproiformes, as do other authorities. However, other authorities classify this taxon as a family, the Antigoniidae, and classify and the Caproidae in the order Acanthuriformes.

== Etymology ==
The deepbody boarfish has the genus name, Antigonia, and this was not explained by Lowe but it is probably a combination of anti, meaning "against", and goneos, which means "ancestor". This may be reference to how A. capros is so distinctive yet seems to elucidate the ancestry of relayed forms which Lowe felt were randomly classified before he described A. capros. The specific name, capros, means "boar" but is an indicator of its perceived familial relationship with Capros aper.

== Description ==
The deepbody boarfish has a highly compressed, rhomboid shaped body with convex dorsal and ventral profiles. The small head bears bony ridges that radiate, has a concave dorsal profile and a clear crest along the nape. The eyes are large and the mouth is small, upward pointing, opens at the front and has protrusible jaws. The continuous dorsal fin is supported by 8 (occasionally 7 or 9) spines, the third spine being the longest, and between 33 and 37 soft rays. The anal fin has 2 or 3 spines with the first spine being the longest, these are separated from the 29 to 34 soft rays. The long bases of the soft rayed dorsal and anal fins have scaly sheaths. The roundly pointed pectoral fins have a single spine and 12 or 13 fin rays. The overall colour of the body is orange red with 3 dark red vertical bands on the eye, the mid-body and the caudal peduncle. This species has a maximum published total length of 30.5 cm (12.0 in).

== Distribution and habitat ==
The deepbody boarfish is found in tropical and subtropical oceans throughout the world. In the eastern Atlantic it occurs as far north as the Bay of Biscay off France south to South Africa including the Canary Islands and Cape Verde. In the western Atlantic it is found from New England south to Uruguay, including the Caribbean. In the Indo-Pacific it is found from East Africa to Hawaii, north to Japan and south to Australia. It is a demersal fish which is found at depths between 50 and 900 m (160 and 2,950 ft), although it is normally found between 100 and 300 m (330 and 980 ft), over rocky slopes and ledges.

== Biology ==
The deepwater boarfish feeds on zooplankton, small molluscs and crustaceans. It is frequently encountered in large aggregations. The adults are found closer to the bottom and the juveniles in midwater.
