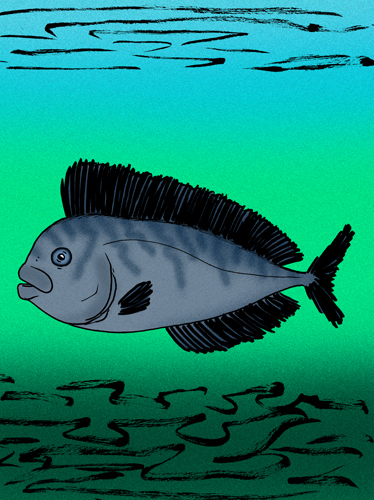
- Artist's restoration of E. bondei

Scientific classification
- Domain: Eukaryota
- Kingdom: Animalia
- Phylum: Chordata
- Class: Actinopterygii
- Clade: Percomorpha
- Family: †Exelliidae
- Genus: †Eoluvarus; Sahni & Choudhary, 1977
- Species: †E. bondei

Binomial name
- †Eoluvarus bondei Sahni & Choudhary, 1977

= Eoluvarus =

Eoluvarus Temporal range: Early Eocene, Ypresian

Extinct genus of fishes

Eoluvarus ("dawn Luvarus") is an extinct genus of marine ray-finned fish from the Eocene of India. It contains a single species, E. bondei from the late Ypresian-aged fuller's earth deposits in the Kapurdi Formation of the Barmer District, Rajasthan.

As its name suggests, it was initially considered an early louvar. Later, more comprehensive specimens were found from the same locality, and E. bondei was reappraised as being a relative of Exellia, an unusual genus of spadefish-like percomorph known from Italy and Turkmenistan, and thus also a member of the family Exelliidae.
