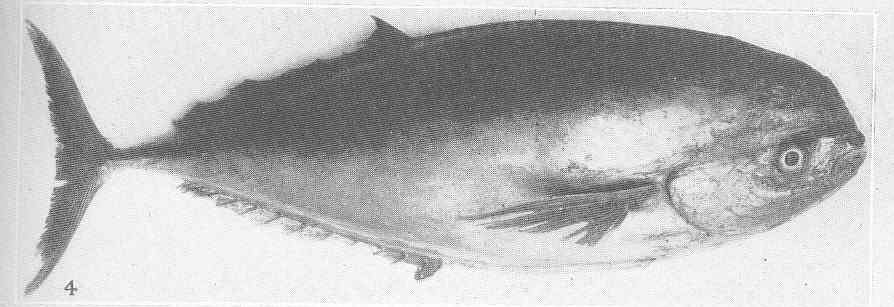
- Louvar (L. imperialis)

Scientific classification
- Kingdom: Animalia
- Phylum: Chordata
- Class: Actinopterygii
- Division: Teleostei
- Order: Acanthuriformes
- Family: Luvaridae
- Genus: Luvarus; Rafinesque, 1810

Type species
- Luvarus imperialis Rafinesque, 1810

Synonyms
- Ausonia Risso, 1827; Diana Risso, 1827; Proctostegus Nardo, 1827; Proluvarus Danilchenko, 1968; Astrodermus Cuvier, 1829; Scrofaria Gistel, 1848

= Luvarus =

Luvarus Temporal range: Early Eocene to present

Genus of fishes

Luvarus is a genus of ray-finned fishes belonging to the family Luvaridae. It is the only extant genus in that family and its only extant species is the cosmopolitan louvar (Luvarus imperialis), with one potential fossil species (L. necopinatus) known from the earliest Eocene of Turkmenistan.

== Species ==
Luvarus contains the following 2 species:

- Luvarus imperialis Rafinesque, 1810 (Louvar)
- †Luvarus necopinatus (Danilchenko, 1968)

A reexamination of the specimens of Luvarus praeimperialis published in 1995 found that it has features which are not consistent with its classification in this genus and familyand it has been classified in its own genus Aluvarus as family incertae sedis.

A 2026 study found that Luvarus necopinatus may actually be most closely related to Kushlukia, an extinct relative of the luvar belonging to its own family, Kushlukiidae. Meanwhile, the closest relative of Luvarus was instead found to be the extinct Avitoluvarus, with A. eocaenicus being the sister species to the modern Luvarus imperialis.
