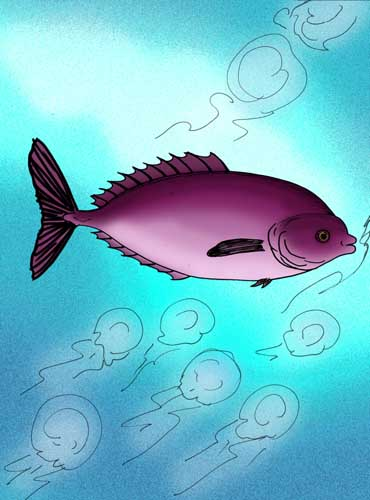
- Artist's reconstruction

Scientific classification
- Kingdom: Animalia
- Phylum: Chordata
- Class: Actinopterygii
- Division: Teleostei
- Order: Acanthuriformes
- Family: Luvaridae
- Genus: Luvarus
- Species: †L. necopinatus

Binomial name
- †Luvarus necopinatus (Daniltshenko, 1968)

Synonyms
- †Proluvarus necopinatus Daniltshenko, 1968

= Luvarus necopinatus =

Luvarus necopinatus Temporal range: 59–56 Ma Thanetian to Ypresian

Extinct species of fish

Luvarus necopinatus is a species of extinct louvar that lived in the Tethys Ocean during the early Paleogene. It differs from the modern species, L. imperialis, in that L. necopinatus has an oval body shape, and is around one foot in length when fully grown.

The first specimens were found from the Danata Formation Lagerstätten, of the Thanetian to Ypresian epochs of Turkmenistan. L. necopinatus was originally described as "Proluvarus necopinatus," citing several anatomical differences between Proluvarus and Luvarus. A later reexamination of the fossil specimens lead researchers to reappraise Proluvarus as a junior synonym, as well as determine that specimens of what were originally thought to be juveniles were actually two different species of a different genus of louvar, Avitoluvarus.

A 2026 phylogenetic study found that L. necopinatus may actually be most closely related to Kushlukia.
