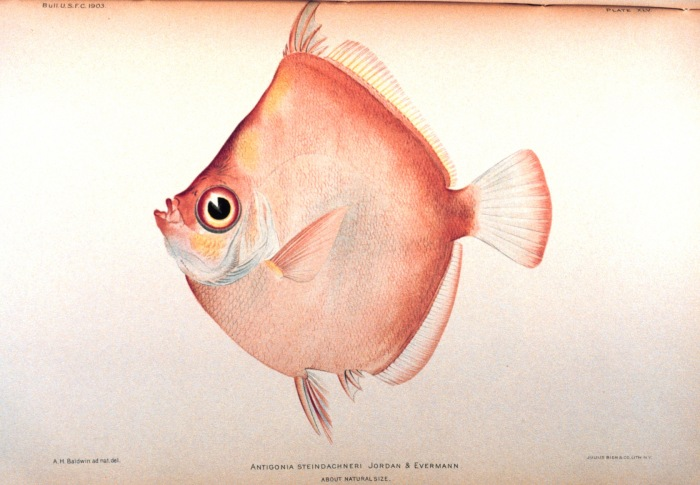
- Deepbody boarfish, (A. capros)

Scientific classification
- Kingdom: Animalia
- Phylum: Chordata
- Class: Actinopterygii
- Order: Acanthuriformes
- Family: Antigoniidae
- Genus: Antigonia; R. T. Lowe, 1843

Type species
- Antigonia capros Lowe, 1843

Synonyms
- Caprophonus Müller & Troschel, 1848; Hypsinotus Temminck & Schlegel, 1844

= Antigonia (fish) =

Antigonia Temporal range: Early Oligocene–present

Genus of fishes

Antigonia is a genus of marine ray-finned fish belonging to the family Antigoniidae, the deepwater boarfishes, of which it is the only extant genus. This genus is found in the warmer oceans around the world.

== Taxonomy ==
Antigonia was first proposed as a monospecific genus in 1843 by the English zoologist Richard Thomas Lowe when he described Antigonia capros as a new species. When Lowe described A. capros he gave its type locality as Madeira. The 5th edition of Fishes of the World classifies this genus in the Antigoniinae, a subfamily of the Caproidae, within the order Caproiformes, as do other authorities. However, other authorities classify this taxon as a family, the Antigoniidae, and classify and the Caproidae in the order Acanthuriformes.

Fossil specimens of juvenile Antigonia are known from the Early Oligocene of Poland and Romania. A potential earlier specimen is known from the Middle Eocene of North Caucasus, Russia, but this classification is only tentative. An earlier specimen from the Early Eocene of Italy is now placed in its own genus, †Eoantigonia. Potential even earlier records are known from the Early Eocene of New Zealand and Middle Eocene of Europe, but only from isolated otoliths.

== Etymology ==
Antigonia, the genus name, was not explained by Lowe but it is probably a combination of anti, meaning "against", and goneos, which means "ancestor". This may be reference to how A. capros is so distinctive yet seems to elucidate the ancestry of relayed forms which Lowe felt were randomly classified before he described A. capros.

== Species ==
Antigonia contains the following recognised species:

- Antigonia aurorosea Parin & Borodulina, 1986
- Antigonia capros R. T. Lowe, 1843 (deepbody boarfish)
- Antigonia combatia Berry & Rathjen, 1959 (shortspine boarfish)
- Antigonia emanuela Prokofiev, Psomadakis & Gon, 2020 (Emanuela's boarfish)
- Antigonia eos C. H. Gilbert, 1905
- Antigonia hulleyi Parin & Borodulina, 2005
- Antigonia indica Parin & Borodulina, 1986
- Antigonia kenyae Parin & Borodulina, 2005
- Antigonia malayana M. C. W. Weber, 1913 (Malayan deepsea boarfish)
- Antigonia ovalis Parin & Borodulina, 2006
- Antigonia quiproqua Parin & Borodulina, 2006
- Antigonia rhomboidea McCulloch, 1915 (rhomboidal boarfish)
- Antigonia rubescens (Günther, 1860) (Indo-Pacific boarfish)
- Antigonia rubicunda J. D. Ogilby, 1910 (rosy deepsea boarfish)
- Antigonia saya Parin & Borodulina, 1986
- Antigonia socotrae Parin & Borodulina, 2006
- Antigonia undulata Parin & Borodulina, 2005
- Antigonia xenolepis Parin & Borodulina, 1986

The following otolith-based fossil species are also known:

- †Antigonia angusta Stinton & Nolf, 1970 - Middle Eocene of Belgium, and potentially England, France, and Germany
- †Antigonia artata Schwarzhans, 2019 - Early Eocene of New Zealand
- †Antigonia fornicata Stinton, 1962 - Late Miocene of Victoria, Australia
- †Antigonia postangusta Holec, 1975 - Middle Miocene of Slovakia

== Characteristics ==
Antigonia boarfishes have highly compressed, rhomboid shaped bodies with convex dorsal and ventral profiles. The small head bears bony ridges that radiate, has a concave dorsal profile and a clear crest along the nape. The eyes are large and the mouth is small, upward pointing, opens at the front and has protrusible jaws. The continuous dorsal fin has 8 or 9 spines, the third spine being the longest. The anal fin has 2 or 3 spines with the first spine being the longest. The anal spines are separated from the anal fin rays. The long bases of the soft rayed dorsal and anal fins have scaly sheaths. The roundly pointed pectoral fins have a single spine and 12 or 13 fin rays. The largest species is the deepbody boarfish (A. capros) with a maximum published total length of 30.5 cm (12.0 in) while the smallest is A. kenyae at 4.4 cm (1.7 in).

== Distribution ==
Antigonia boarfishes are found in the tropical and temperate Indian, Pacific and Atlantic Oceans.
