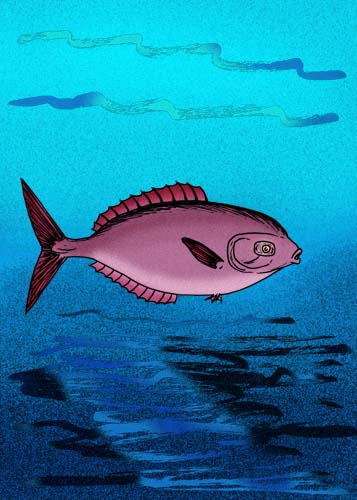
- Artist's reconstruction

Scientific classification
- Kingdom: Animalia
- Phylum: Chordata
- Class: Actinopterygii
- Division: Teleostei
- Order: Acanthuriformes
- Family: Luvaridae
- Genus: †Beerichthys; Casier, 1966
- Species: †B. ingens

Binomial name
- †Beerichthys ingens Casier, 1966

= Beerichthys =

Beerichthys Temporal range: Lower Eocene

Extinct genus of fishes

Beerichthys is an extinct genus of prehistoric marine ray-finned fish. It contains a single species, Beerichthys ingens, that was a member of the Ypresian London Clay fauna of lower Eocene England.

It is known only from a series of incomplete skulls. When originally described in 1966, B. ingens was placed in a monotypic family, "Beerichthyidae," within Iniomi. Later, more (also incomplete) skulls were studied by Colin Patterson, who determined that the fish was a louvar, an assessment supported with further CT scanning of its fossils.

== See also ==
- Prehistoric fish
- List of prehistoric bony fish
