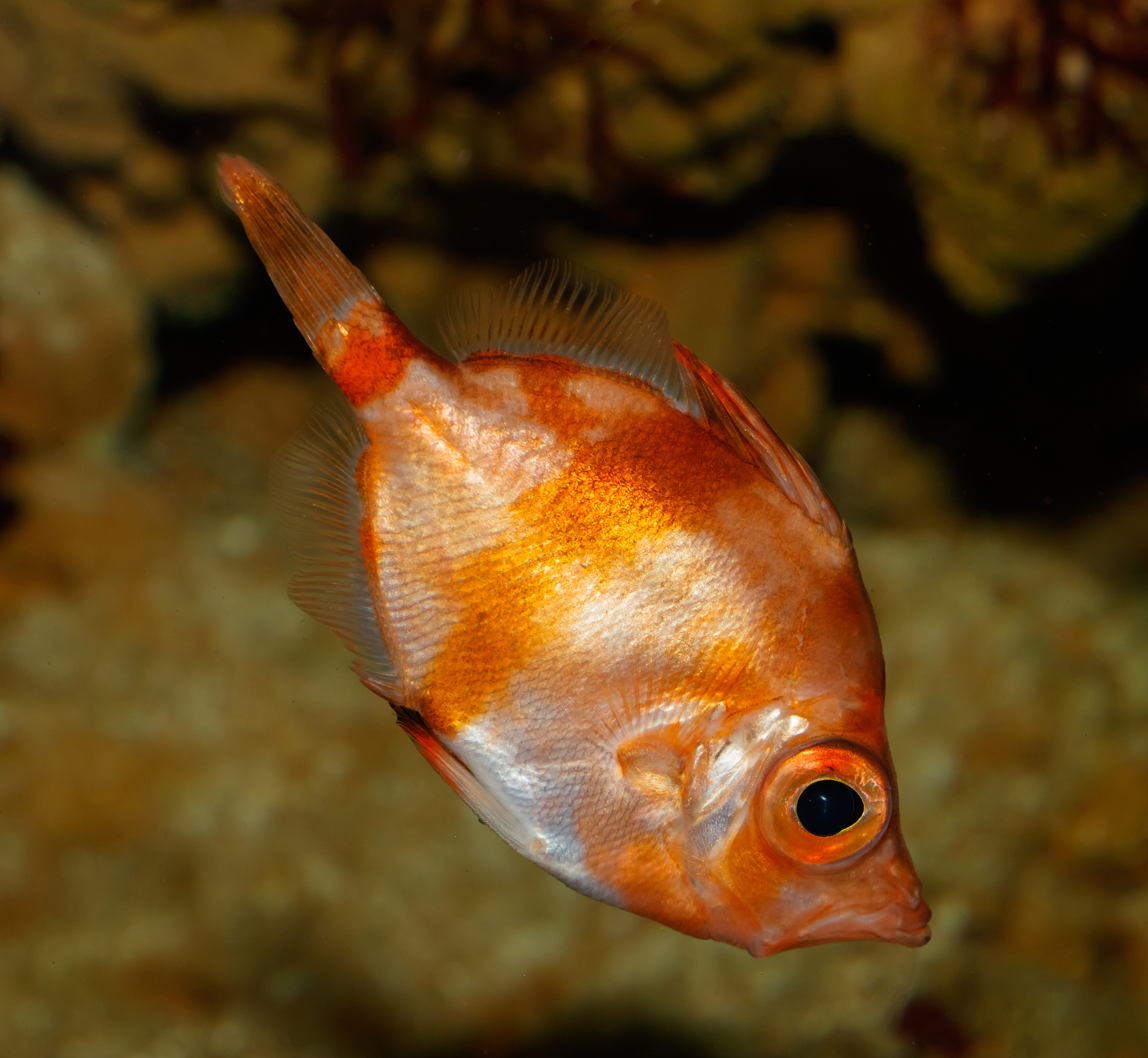

Conservation status
- Least Concern (IUCN 3.1)

Scientific classification
- Kingdom: Animalia
- Phylum: Chordata
- Class: Actinopterygii
- Division: Teleostei
- Order: Acanthuriformes
- Family: Caproidae; Bonaparte, 1835
- Genus: Capros; Lacépède, 1802
- Species: C. aper

Binomial name
- Capros aper (Linnaeus, 1758)

Synonyms
- Zeus aper Linnaeus, 1758; Perca pusilla Brünnich, 1768; Perca brunnich Lacépède, 1802

= Capros =

Species of fish

Capros, the boarfish or Zulu fish, is a monospecific genus of marine ray-finned fish belonging to the family Caproidae. Its only known species is Capros aper. The boarfish is found in the northeastern Atlantic Ocean and the Mediterranean.

== Taxonomy ==
Capros aper was first formally described as Zeus aper by Carl Linnaeus in the 10th edition of Systema Naturae published in 1758. Linnaeus gave the type localities as Rome and Genoa in Italy. In 1802 Bernard Germain de Lacépède classified Zeus aper into the monotypic genus Capros. Some authorities treat Capros as the only genus in the family Caproidae. However, the 5th edition of Fishes of the World includes Antigonia in the Caproidae, albeit placing this taxon in the monotypic subfamily Caproinae and Antigonia in the similarly monotypic subfamily Antigoniinae. The Caproidae is the only family in the order Caproiformess.

== Etymology ==
Capros is a latinisation of kapros, the Greek for "boar". The specific name aper is Latin for "wild boar". Both are allusions to the cylindrical snout, ending in a small mouth with a protrusible upper lip, resembling a pig.

== Description ==
Capros has an oval, compressed and deep body with the depth of the body being greater than the length of the head. The depth of the body fits into the standard length between 1.7 and 1.9 times. The dorsal profile of the head is concave with a conical snout. The large eyes which are approximately equal in diameter to the length of the snout. The large mouth is very protrusible, protruding out as a short tube. There are a pair of spiny plates near the symphysis if the jaws. Each jaw has 4 or 5 rows of narrow with a patch of very small vomerine teeth arranged in a cloverleaf shape and there are a small number of similar teeth on the palatine. The bones of the head have rough surfaces and spines. The dorsal fin is deeply incised, the incision separating the 9 or 10 robust, grooved spines from the 23 to 25 branched soft rays. The anal fin is supported by 3, short, thick spines and between 22 and 24 soft rays. The pectoral fins are short and rounded having a length that is half of the length of the head and contains 15 fin rays. The pelvic fin has a single robust spine and f thick soft rays and the fin does not reach much beyond the second spine in the anal fin. The spines and rays in the paired fins have lots of spinelets on them. The boarfish is covered in small scales that feel rough when touched. The lateral line has 20 tubed scales and terminates underneath the rearmost spine of the dorsal fin. The overall colour of the head and body is silver-gold with the spiny parts of the dorsal fin being black with a wide red upper margin, the rest of the dorsal fin, the anal fin and the caudal fin are black with dusky yellow margins. The pelvic fins are red. Fishes found in deeper water, deeper than 200 m (660 ft) are a red in colour, which may be broken up by yellow bars. The boarfish has a maximum published total length of 30 cm (12 in), although 13 cm (5.1 in) is more typical.

== Distribution and habitat ==
Capros is widespread in the Eastern Atlantic, from western Norway, Skagerrak, Shetland, and western Scotland to Senegal. It is also present in the Mediterranean, especially in the western part. It is found at depths between 40 and 600 m (130 and 1,970 ft), although its depth range in the eastern Aegean Sea is 288 to 700 m (940 to 2,300 ft). The boarfish is found over coral, rocks and sand, being most common along the edge of the continental shelf and areas of high productivity.

== Biology ==
Capros is a carnivorous genus which feeds mainly on small crustaceans and polychaetes as well as molluscs and hydrozoans. The boarfish is a R-strategist, they produce a large number of pelagic eggs which hatch into very small larvae and provide no parental care. They are also, however, long lived and are slow to reach sexual maturity. Spawning takes place between April and August in the Aegean, elsewhere in the Mediterranean it has been recorded from March to August and in the northeastern Atlantic between April and September. In the Aegean both sexes reach sexual maturity at a total length of 6.69 cm (2.63 in) but the females appear to mature earlier than the males, in the Mediterranean maturity was found to be reached at 2 years old and 8.5 cm (3.3 in) and 4.6 years old while in the Atlantic the total length at maturity is 9.7 cm (3.8 in) and 3.4 years old. It is a gregarious species which aggregates in schools. Despite their well armoured bodies boarfishes are known to be taken by a number of fishes, including tope (Galeorhinus galeus), thornback ray (Raja clavata), conger eel (Conger conger), bigeye tuna (Thunnus obesus), and blackspot seabream (Pagellus bogaraveo), as well as birds such as Cory's shearwater (Calonectris diomedea), common tern (Sterna hirundo) and the yellow-legged gull (Larus cachinnans).

== Fisheries ==
Capros has increased in frequency in fishing catches in the northeastern Atlantic in the late 20th and early 21st Centuries. The numbers caught in the Bay of Biscay increased between the early 1970s and 2000 from 7 fishes per haul to 1500 per haul, the increase is at least partially caused by increasing water temperatures. Most of the catch is processed into fish meal. This genus has life history characteristics, e.g. longevity and late maturity, that make it more vulnerable to overfishing than other small pelagic, schooling fish such as Atlantic herring (Clupea harengus) and European pilchard (Sardina pilchardus).
