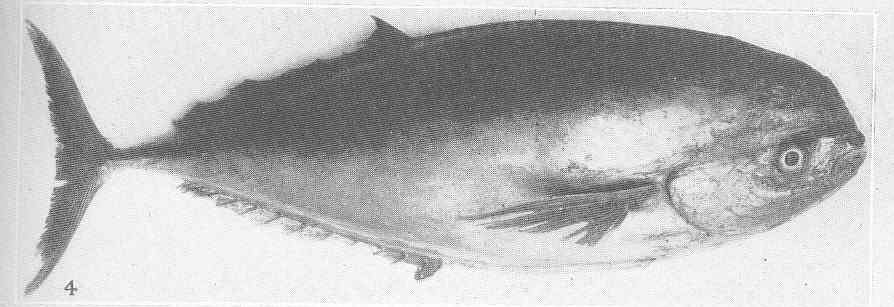
- Luvarus imperialis

Scientific classification
- Kingdom: Animalia
- Phylum: Chordata
- Class: Actinopterygii
- Order: Acanthuriformes
- Suborder: Acanthuroidei
- Family: Luvaridae; Gill, 1885

= Luvaridae =

Luvaridae Temporal range: Late Paleocene–present

Family of fishes

Luvaridae is a family of marine ray-finned fishes belonging to the suborder Acanthuroidei in the order Acanthuriformes, of which they are the only pelagic members. The family has a single extant species, the widespread louvar (Luvarus imperialis) and a small number of known extinct species.

== Genera and species ==
The family Luvaridae contains the following taxa:

- Genus Luvarus Rafinesque, 1810
  - Luvarus imperialis Rafinesque, 1810
  - † Luvarus necopinatus (Danilchenko, 1968)
- † Aluvarus? Bannikov & Tyler, 1995 (disputed)
  - † Aluvarus praeimperialis (Arambourg, 1967)
- † Avitoluvarus Bannikov & Tyler, 1995
  - † Avitoluvarus mariannae Bannikov & Tyler, 1995
  - † Avitoluvarus dianae Bannikov & Tyler, 1995
  - † Avitoluvarus eocaenicus Bannikov & Tyler, 2001
- † Beerichthys Casier, 1996
  - † Beerichthys ingens Casier, 1996
- † Kushlukia Danilchenko, 1968
  - † Kushlukia permira Danilchenko, 1968

† means extinct
