= Eolamprogrammus =

Eolamprogrammus Temporal range: Earliest Ypresian

Scientific classification
- Domain: Eukaryota
- Kingdom: Animalia
- Phylum: Chordata
- Class: Actinopterygii
- Order: Ophidiiformes
- Family: Ophidiidae
- Subfamily: Neobythitinae
- Genus: †Eolamprogrammus; Daniltshenko, 1968
- Species: †E. senectus

Binomial name
- †Eolamprogrammus senectus Daniltshenko, 1968

Extinct genus of fishes

Eolamprogrammus ("dawn Lamprogrammus") is an extinct genus of prehistoric marine cusk-eel that lived during the earliest Eocene. It contains a single species, E. senectus from the earliest Ypresian-aged Danata Formation of Turkmenistan. It may potentially represent an early member of the Neobythitinae.

== See also ==
- Prehistoric fish
- List of prehistoric bony fish
