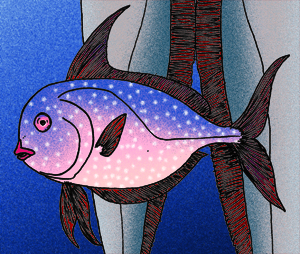

Scientific classification
- Kingdom: Animalia
- Phylum: Chordata
- Class: Actinopterygii
- Order: Lampriformes
- Family: †Turkmenidae
- Genus: †Analectis; Daniltshenko, 1980
- Species: †A. pala

Binomial name
- †Analectis pala Daniltshenko, 1980

= Analectis =

Analectis Temporal range: Early Oligocene 33.9–28.1 Ma

Extinct genus of fishes

Analectis pala is an extinct lamprid of the family Turkmenidae, of which it was the last surviving member. Its fossils are found from Early Oligocene strata of the Krasnodar Krai, Russia. Analectis, as with the other members of Turkmenidae, was a close relative of the opahs. An indeterminate lamprid with potential affinities to it is known from the early Eocene of Denmark.
