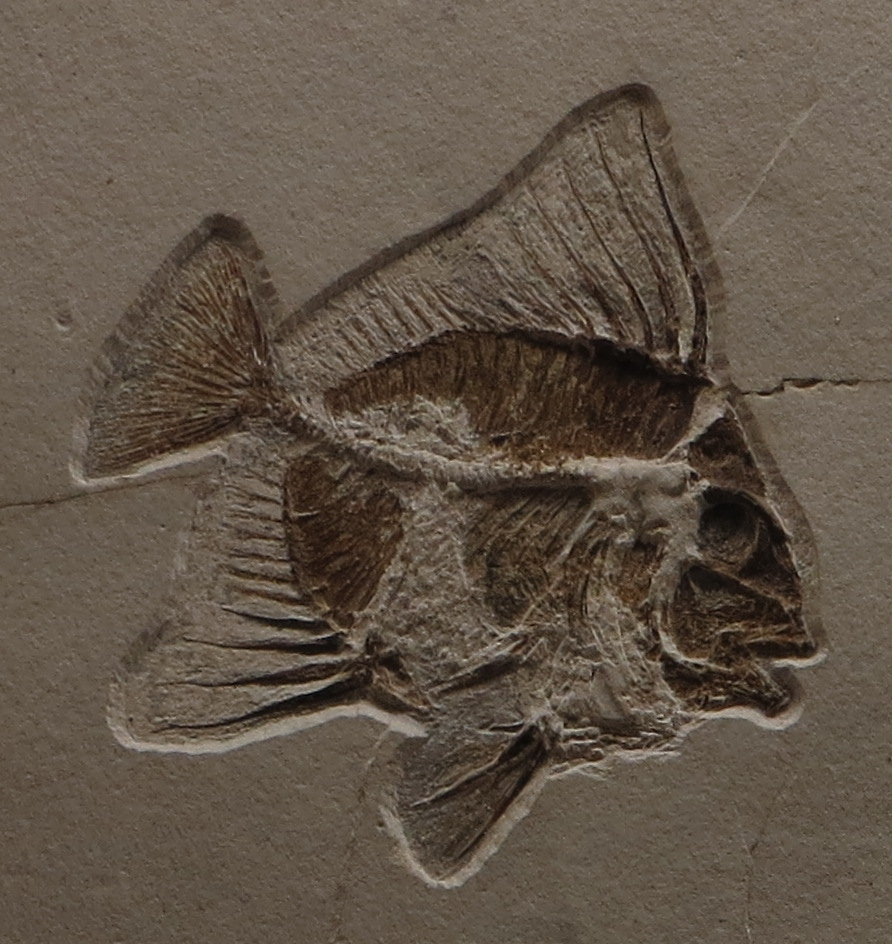
- Fossil of A. subaureus

Scientific classification
- Kingdom: Animalia
- Phylum: Chordata
- Class: Actinopterygii
- Order: Acanthuriformes
- Suborder: Acanthuroidei
- Family: †Acanthonemidae; Bannikov, 1991
- Genus: †Acanthonemus; Agassiz, 1833
- Species: †A. subaureus

Binomial name
- †Acanthonemus subaureus (de Blainville, 1818)

Synonyms
- †A. bertrandi Agassiz, 1834; †A. filamentosus Agassiz, 1834

= Acanthonemus =

Acanthonemus Temporal range: Early Eocene

Extinct genus of fishes

Acanthonemus (from Greek: ἄκανθα akantha, 'spine' and Greek: νεμω nemo 'to distribute' or 'covered') is an extinct genus of prehistoric marine ray-finned fish that lived from the early Eocene. It contains a single species, A. subaureus (synonyms: A. bertrandi Agassiz, 1834, A. filamentosus Agassiz, 1834), known from the famous Monte Bolca site in Italy. It is the only genus in the extinct family Acanthonemidae.

== See also ==
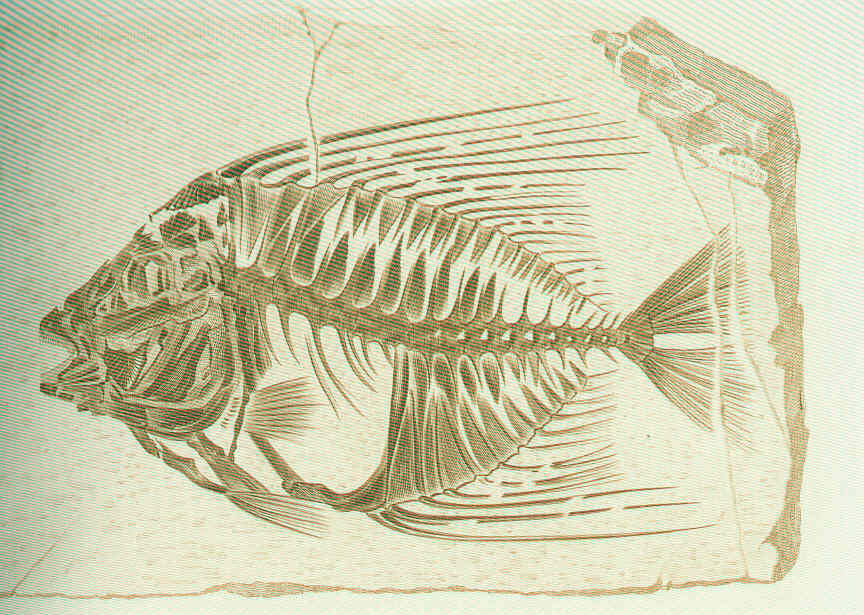
Illustration from Dictionnaire Universel d'Histoire Naturelle. Atlas (1849)

- Prehistoric fish
- List of prehistoric bony fish
