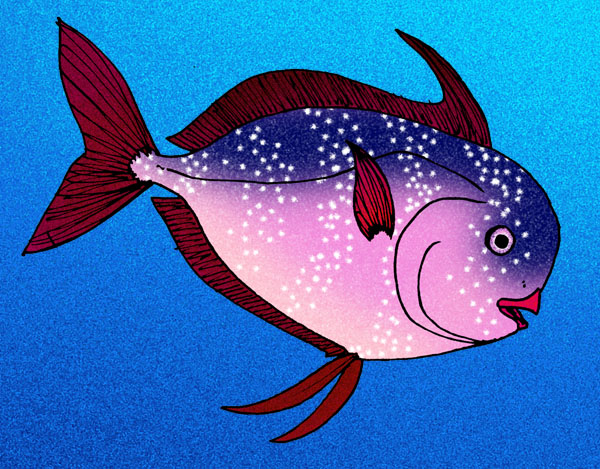

Scientific classification
- Domain: Eukaryota
- Kingdom: Animalia
- Phylum: Chordata
- Class: Actinopterygii
- Order: Lampriformes
- Family: †Turkmenidae
- Genus: †Turkmene; Daniltshenko, 1968
- Species: †T. finitimus

Binomial name
- †Turkmene finitimus Daniltshenko, 1968

= Turkmene =

Turkmene Temporal range: Thanetian

Extinct genus of fishes

Turkmene finitimus is an extinct lamprid from the Danata Formation Lagerstatten, of the Upper Paleocene of Turkmenistan. It lived sympatrically with its close relative, Danatinia.

In life, T. finitimus would have resembled a spadefish with beak-like lips, or a very small opah (its closest living relative) with a bulging forehead.
