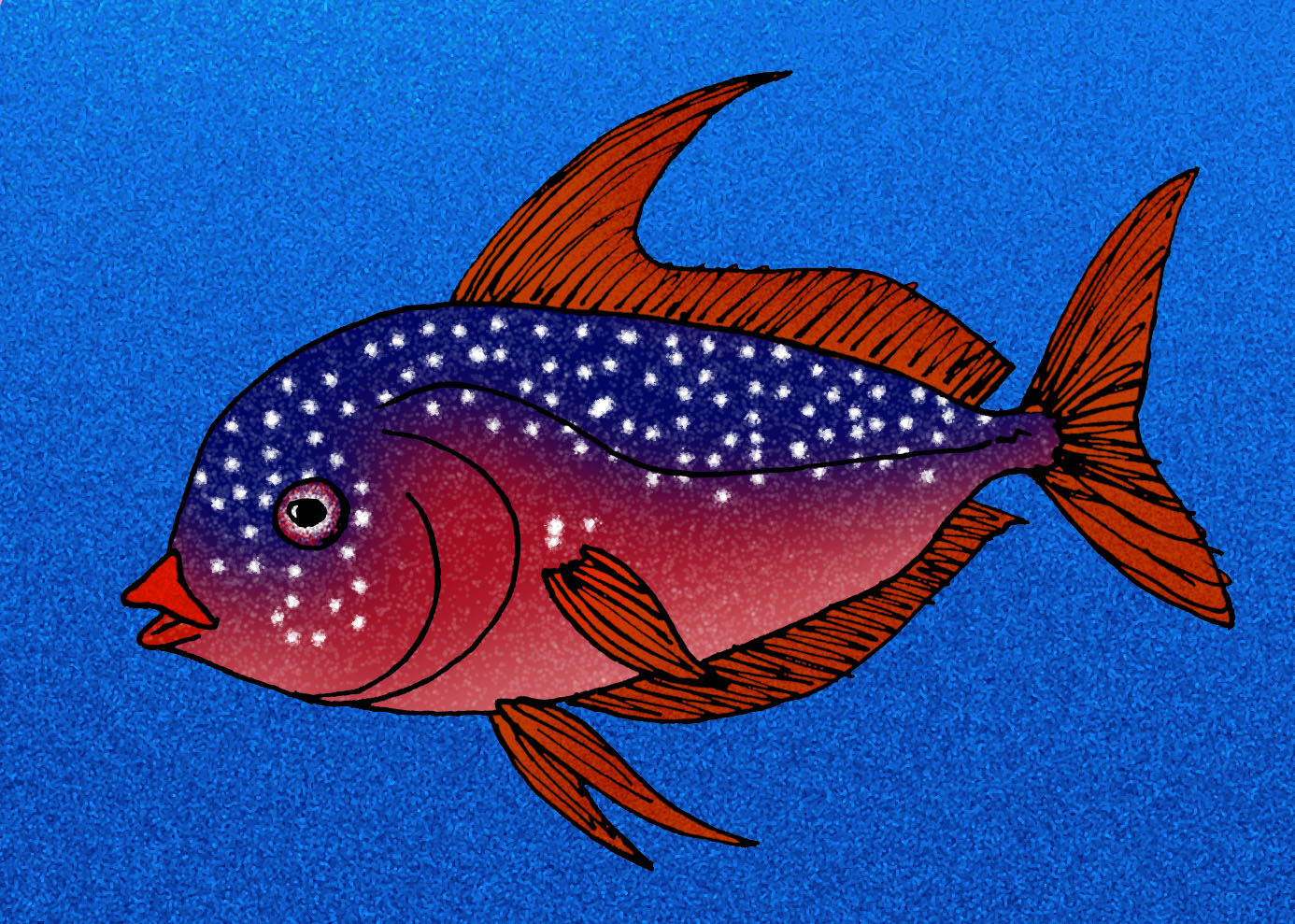

Scientific classification
- Domain: Eukaryota
- Kingdom: Animalia
- Phylum: Chordata
- Class: Actinopterygii
- Order: Lampriformes
- Family: †Turkmenidae
- Genus: †Danatinia; Daniltshenko, 1968
- Species: †D. casca

Binomial name
- †Danatinia casca Daniltshenko, 1968

= Danatinia =

Danatinia Temporal range: Early Ypresian

Extinct genus of fishes

Danatinia is an extinct genus of lamprid fish from the Eocene. It contains a single species, D. casca from Danata Formation Lagerstatten, of the earliest Ypresian of Turkmenistan. It was first named by Daniltshenko in 1968.

D. casca was sympatric with its close relative, Turkmene. In life, it would have resembled a very small opah.
