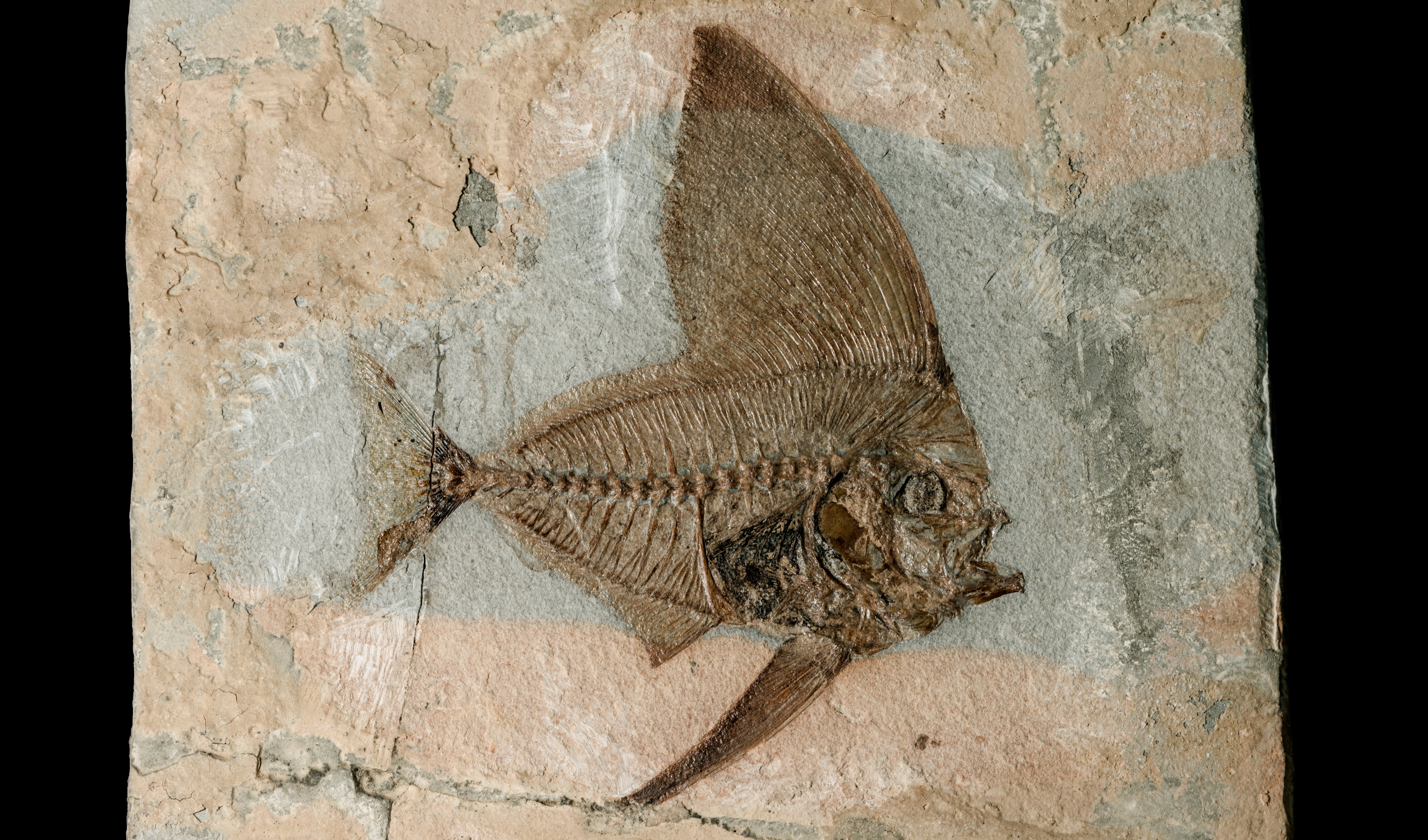
- Fossil specimen of E. velifer

Scientific classification
- Kingdom: Animalia
- Phylum: Chordata
- Class: Actinopterygii
- Clade: Percomorpha
- Family: †Exelliidae
- Genus: †Exellia; White & Moy-Thomas, 1941

Type species
- †Kurtus velifer Volta, 1796

Species
- †E. velifer Volta, 1796; †E. proxima Daniltshenko, 1968

Synonyms
- Semiophorus Agassiz, 1841

= Exellia =

Exellia Temporal range: Earliest to Late Ypresian

Extinct genus of fishes

Exellia is a genus of extinct marine ray-finned fish that inhabited the northern Tethys Ocean during the early Eocene. It is notable for its large, highly conspicuous dorsal fin.

== Taxonomy ==
It contains the following species:

- E. proxima Daniltshenko, 1968 - earliest Ypresian of Turkmenistan (Danata Formation)
- E. velifer (Volta, 1796) (type species) - late Ypresian of Italy (Monte Bolca)

In addition, an indeterminate species is also known from the earliest Eocene-aged Fur Formation of Denmark, although it has not yet been assigned to its own species. The species Exellia schaerbeeki (van Beneden, 1881) from the middle Eocene of Belgium is too fragmentary and cannot be properly assigned to a genus.

The latter-occurring species, E. velifer, is the better studied species, and is known from numerous adult and juvenile specimens from the Monte Bolca lagerstätten. This type species was initially described by Volta (1796) as Kurtus velifer, but placed in its own genus, Semiophorus, by Agassiz (1841). This genus was used for over a century; however, White & Moy-Thomas (1941) found Semiophorus to be preoccupied by a synonym for the lizard genus Sitana, and thus suggested the new genus name Exellia.

The taxonomic affinities of Exellia have long been debated due to its unusual appearance. Authors have variously assigned it to the Carangidae, Caristiidae, Ephippidae, or the Lampriformes. Blot (1969) noted that Exellia displays some traits that prevent any lampriform affinities, and are too primitive for the Perciformes (sensu lato), but ultimately placed it as a basal perciform in its own family, Exelliidae. Also now placed in Exelliidae is Eoluvarus from the Eocene of India, which was previously considered a louvar.

== Description ==
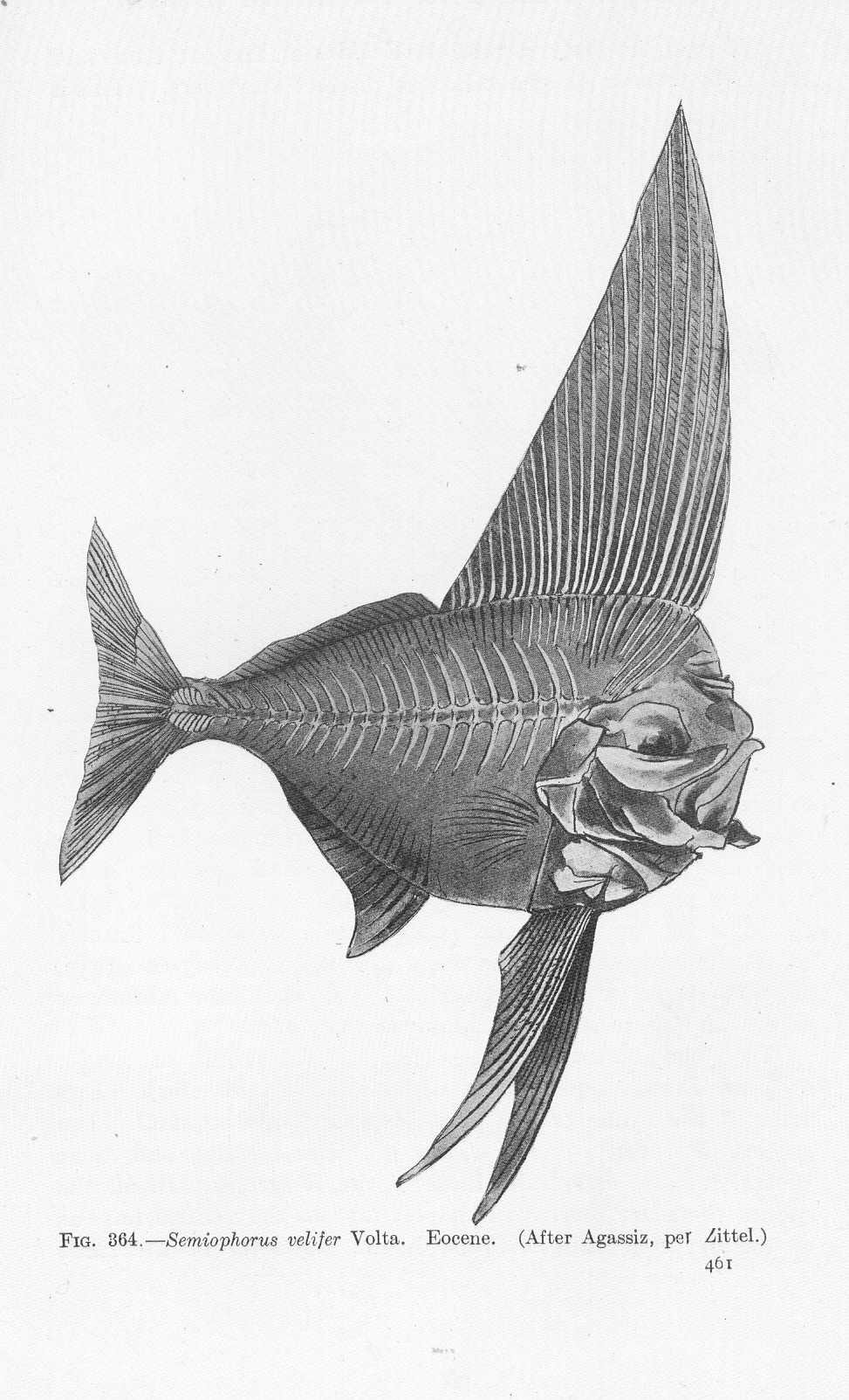
Illustration

The adult form is shaped akin to a large spadefish or a short dolphinfish, with very large pelvic fins, and a long dorsal fin starting from in front of the eyes to near the base of the caudal peduncle. The juvenile form resembles a juvenile drumfish, with the dorsal fin forming a long crest on top of the head.
