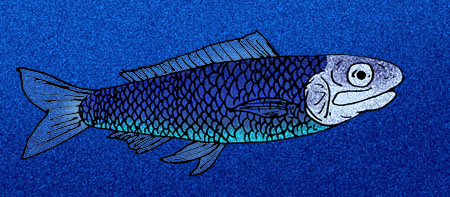
- Life restoration of I. turkmenica

Scientific classification
- Kingdom: Animalia
- Phylum: Chordata
- Class: Actinopterygii
- Division: Teleostei
- Order: Stomiiformes (?)
- Genus: †Idrissia; Arambourg, 1954

Species
- I. jubae Arambourg, 1954; I. turkmenica Prokofiev, 2004

= Idrissia =

Idrissia Temporal range: Cenomanian–Early Eocene

Extinct genus of fishes

Idrissia is an ancient genus of putative marine stomiiform (related to marine hatchetfish and viperfish) fish from the Late Cretaceous and Early Eocene of northern Africa and central Asia. However, Idrissia's position in the order is in doubt, however, as scientists have not studied enough fossil specimens to determine exactly which stomiiforms the genus is most closely related to, and it may not even be a stomiiform. Some authorities treat it as an uncertain teleost. It is also uncertain whether both Idrissia species even belong to the same genus.

The following species are known:

- I. jubae Arambourg, 1954 - Late Cretaceous (Cenomanian) of Morocco (Jbel Tselfat)
- I. turkmenica Prokofiev, 2004 - Early Eocene of Turkmenistan (Danata Formation)

Another species described from the Oligocene of Poland & Romania, I. carpathica, was reclassified into the new genus Xenomesopelagia in 2009.

In life, Idrissia species would have had a superficial resemblance to a small-eyed lanternfish or a minnow.
