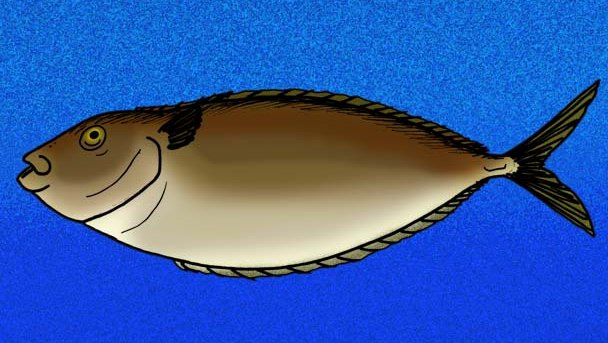
- Artist's reconstruction of K. permira

Scientific classification
- Kingdom: Animalia
- Phylum: Chordata
- Class: Actinopterygii
- Division: Teleostei
- Order: Acanthuriformes
- Family: †Kushlukiidae; Daniltshenko, 1968
- Genus: †Kushlukia; Daniltshenko, 1968
- Species: †K. permira

Binomial name
- †Kushlukia permira Daniltshenko, 1968

= Kushlukia =

Kushlukia Temporal range: Lower Eocene

Extinct genus of fishes

Kushlukia is an extinct genus of prehistoric marine ray-finned fish from the Early Eocene of Asia. It is the only known member of the family Kushlukiidae, which is closely related to the modern louvars. It contains a single described species, K. permira from the Danata Formation lagerstatten of Turkmenistan. An apparent second species of Kushlukia is also known from the Fuller's Earth formation in the Barmer District, of Ypresian Rajasthan, India, although these specimens are too fragmentary to assign a proper species name. Luvarus necopinatus from the Danata Formation, which was previously thought to be closely related to the modern louvar, may actually also be a relative of Kushlukia.

== See also ==
- Avitoluvarus
- Prehistoric fish
- List of prehistoric bony fish
