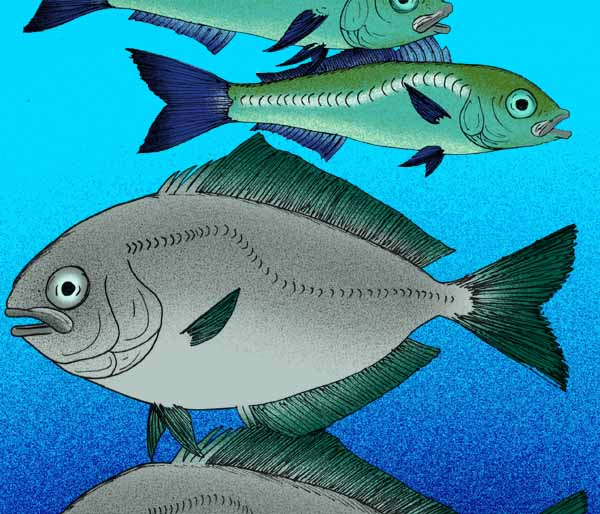
- Archaeus and T. tersus

Scientific classification
- Domain: Eukaryota
- Kingdom: Animalia
- Phylum: Chordata
- Class: Actinopterygii
- Order: Carangiformes
- Suborder: Carangoidei
- Family: Carangidae
- Genus: †Trachicaranx; Daniltshenko, 1968
- Species: †T. tarsus

Binomial name
- †Trachicaranx tarsus Daniltshenko, 1968

Synonyms
- Uylyaichthys eugeniae Prokofiev, 2002

= Trachicaranx =

Trachicaranx Temporal range: Thanetian

Extinct species of fish

Trachicaranx tersus is an extinct primitive, pompano-like jack fish from what is now Turkmenistan. It lived in an ocean upwelling with its relative, Archaeus oblongus during the Thanetian epoch of the late Paleocene. Some incomplete fossil specimens were once identified as being a separate species, "Uylyaichthys eugeniae."
