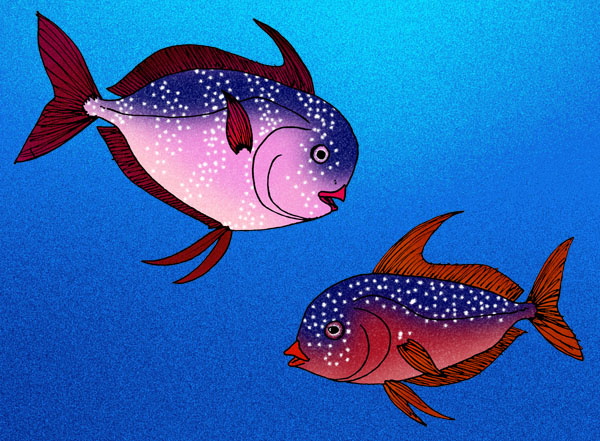
- Turkmene and Danatinia

Scientific classification
- Kingdom: Animalia
- Phylum: Chordata
- Class: Actinopterygii
- Order: Lampriformes
- Family: †Turkmenidae; Daniltshenko, 1968

Genera
- Analectis; Danatinia; Turkmene

= Turkmenidae =

Turkmenidae Temporal range: Thanetian-Late Oligocene ~58–25 Ma

Extinct family of fishes

Turkmenidae is an extinct family of lamprids from the Paleogene of the west-central Asia, in what was formerly the Peri-Tethys Ocean. They were small, disk-shaped fish that bore a strong resemblance to their closest living relatives, the opahs.

Turkmene and Danatinia are found in the Thanetian epoch (of the Paleocene) sections of the Danata Formation of Turkmenistan. Analectis is found in Late Oligocene strata in North Caucasus, Russia. After the extinction of Analectis, Turkmenidae disappears from the fossil record.
