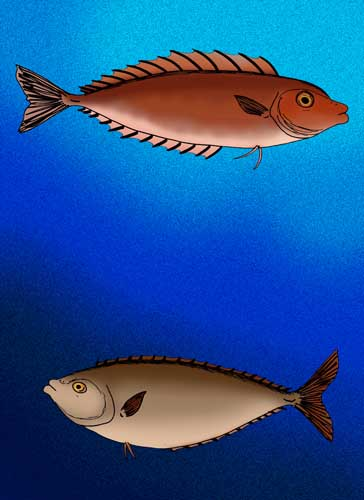
- A. dianae and A. mariannae

Scientific classification
- Kingdom: Animalia
- Phylum: Chordata
- Class: Actinopterygii
- Division: Teleostei
- Order: Acanthuriformes
- Family: Luvaridae
- Genus: †Avitoluvarus; Bannikov & Tyler, 1995

Species
- See text

= Avitoluvarus =

Avitoluvarus Temporal range: 56.0–38.0 Ma Ypresian to Bartonian

Extinct genus of fishes

Avitoluvarus ("ancient louvar") is a genus of extinct louvar that lived in the Peri-Tethys Sea during the early Paleogene. The first specimens were found from the Danata Formation Lagerstätten, of the Ypresian age of Turkmenistan, where they were originally thought to be smaller or juvenile individuals of the true louvar, Luvarus necopinatus. These specimens were later reexamined, and determined to be a separate genus comprising two species.

A third species, A. eocaenicus is known from the Middle Eocene of the Kumsky Horizon, in what is now the Northern Caucasus Mountains in Southwestern Russia. Indeterminate remains are also known from the Ypresian Gerpegezh locality in Russia.

The following species are known:

- A. dianae Bannikov & Tyler, 1995 - Ypresian of Turkmenistan
- A. eocaenicus Bannikov & Tyler, 2001 - Bartonian of Russia
- A. marianae Bannikov & Tyler, 1995 - Ypresian of Turkmenistan

Avitoluvarus differs from modern louvars in that the former's forehead does not bulge out as much, giving the appearance of having the face appear higher.

A 2026 phylogenetic study found that Avitoluvarus represents the sister group to the modern Luvarus, but may be paraphyletic, with A. eocaenicus being the sister genus to the modern louvar, while the other two species form a distinct clade sister to both A. eocaenicus and Luvarus.
