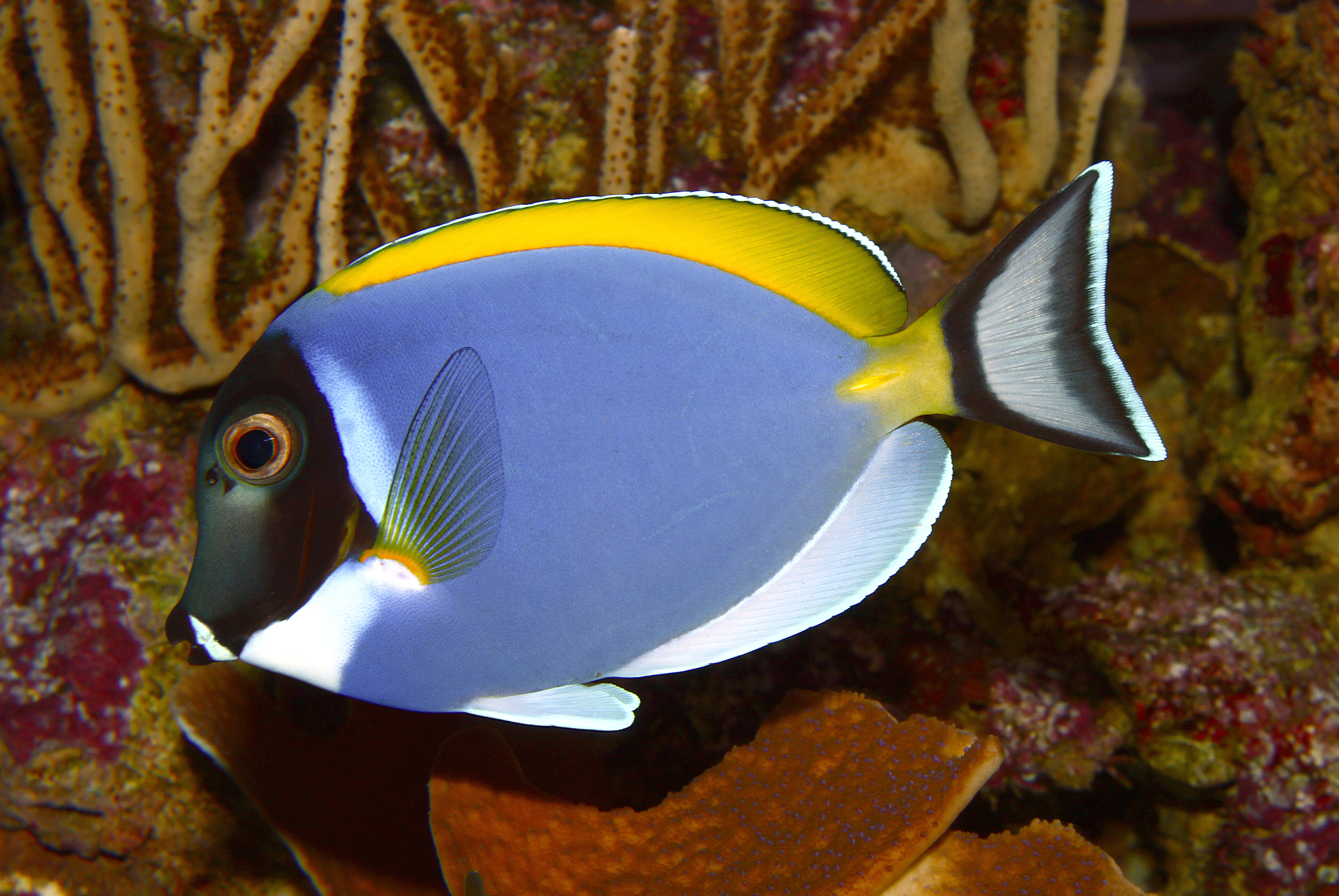
- Powderblue surgeonfish Acanthus leucosternon
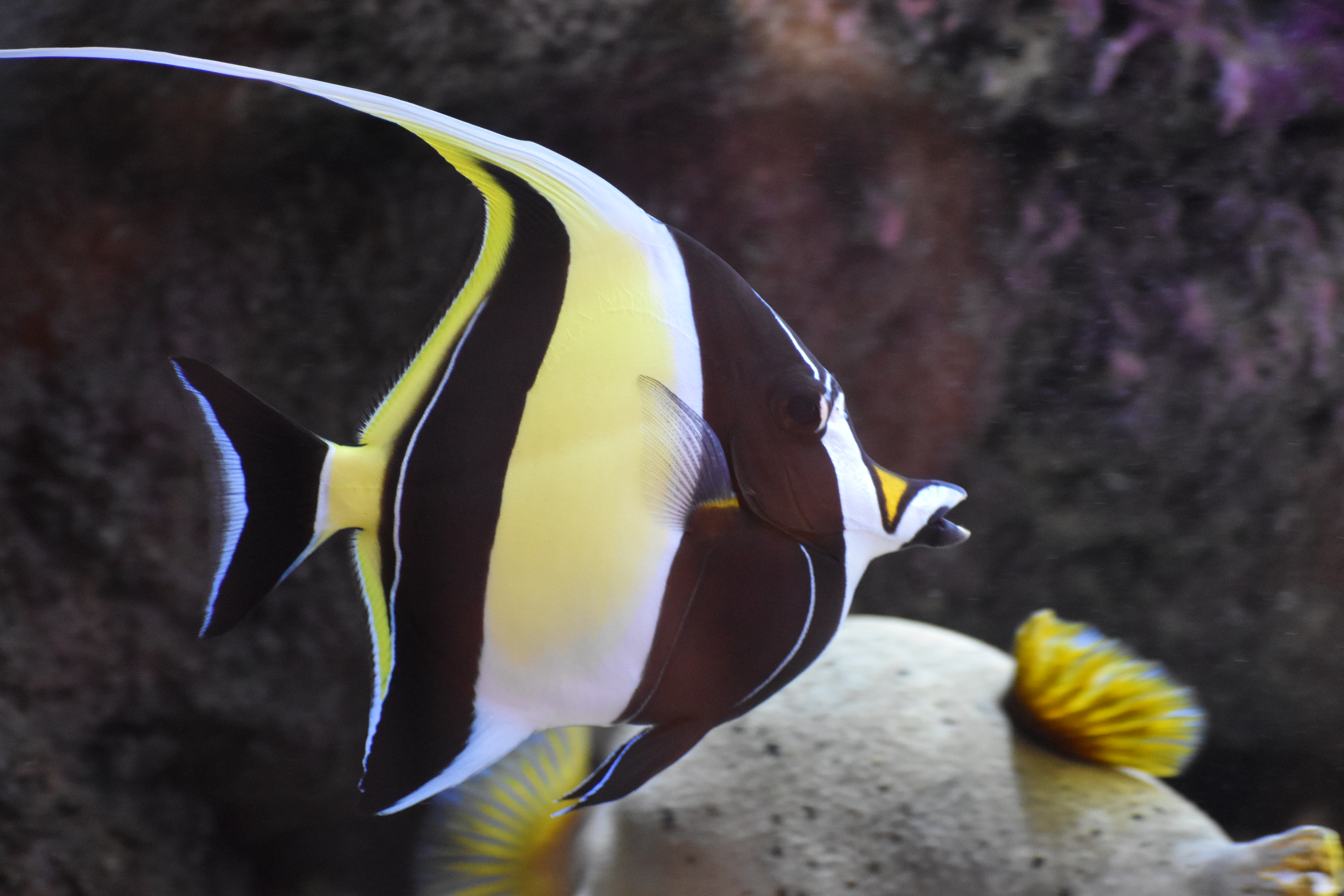
- Moorish idol Zanclus cornutus

Scientific classification
- Kingdom: Animalia
- Phylum: Chordata
- Class: Actinopterygii
- Order: Acanthuriformes
- Suborder: Acanthuroidei; Greenwood et al, 1966

Type species
- Acanthurus triostegus (Linnaeus, 1758)

Families
- see text

Diversity
- 19 genera

= Acanthuroidei =

Suborder of fishes

Acanthuroidei /əˌkænθəˈrɔɪdiːaɪ/, is a group of ray finned fishes which is a suborder of the Acanthuriformes, although older classifications regarded it as a suborder of the Perciformes, the largest order of fish, The suborder includes the surgeonfish and Moorish idol. Members of this suborder have a compressed body covered with small ctenoid scales. The name for the suborder comes from that of the surgeonfish (Acanthuridae) family within it, and is derived from the Greek words akantha and oura, which loosely translate to "thorn" and "tail", respectively, referring to the "scalpels" found on surgeonfishes' caudal peduncle.

== Families ==
Acanthuroidei contains the following families:

- Family Luvaridae Gill, 1885 (Luvar)
- Family Zanclidae Bleeker, 1876 (Moorish angels)
- †Family Massalongiidae Tyler & Bannikov, 2005
- †Family Acanthonemidae Bannikov, 1991
- Family Acanthuridae Bonaparte, 1835 (Surgeonfishes)
  - Subfamily Nasinae Fowler & Bean, 1929
  - Subfamily Acanthurinae Bonaparte, 1835
    - Tribe Prionurini J. L. B. Smith, 1966
    - Tribe Zebrasomini Winterbottom, 1993
    - Tribe Acanthurini Bonaparte, 1835
