= Scombrosarda =

Scientific classification
- Domain: Eukaryota
- Kingdom: Animalia
- Phylum: Chordata
- Class: Actinopterygii
- Order: Perciformes
- Genus: †Scombrosarda; Danilt'chenko, 1962

Extinct genus of fishes

Scombrosarda is an extinct genus of prehistoric perciform fish.
