= Urosphenopsis =

Urosphenopsis Temporal range: Thanetian

Scientific classification
- Domain: Eukaryota
- Kingdom: Animalia
- Phylum: Chordata
- Class: Actinopterygii
- Order: Gasterosteiformes
- Genus: †Urosphenopsis; Daniltshenko 1968

Extinct genus of fishes

Urosphenopsis is an extinct genus of prehistoric bony fish that lived during the Thanetian stage of the Paleocene epoch.
