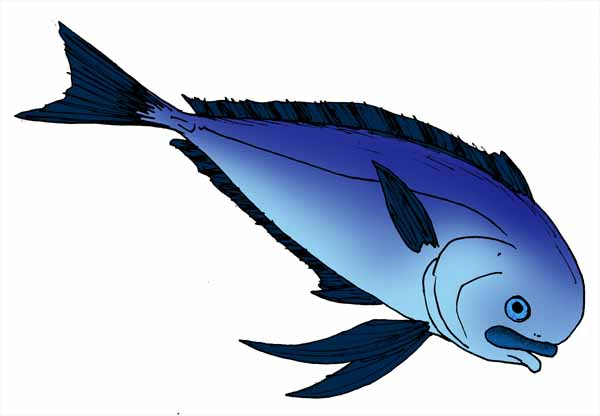
- Artist's reconstruction of an adult as a louvar-like fish

Scientific classification
- Kingdom: Animalia
- Phylum: Chordata
- Class: Actinopterygii
- Clade: Percomorpha
- Genus: †Aluvarus; Bannikov & Tyler, 1995
- Species: †A. praeimperialis

Binomial name
- †Aluvarus praeimperialis (Arambourg, 1967)

Synonyms
- †Luvarus praeimperialis Arambourg, 1967

= Aluvarus =

Aluvarus Temporal range: Priabonian

Extinct genus of fishes

Aluvarus praeimperialis is an extinct ray-finned fish, known from two headless larval fossil specimens found in the Pabdeh Formation, a Late Eocene stratum from the Priabonian epoch, of what is now Iran. A. praeimperialis was originally thought to be a luvar, described as "Luvarus praeimperialis", as it was thought to be a predecessor to the modern luvar. A later reexamination of the specimens showed that they were too incomplete to demonstrate such a conclusion and had no clear exclusive shared traits with luvar, and were renamed "Aluvarus", meaning "not luvar" or "different than luvar". However, some authorities still retain it as a luvar.

The Pabdeh Formation was originally dated to the early Oligocene, but more recent analysis indicates it to be from the mid-late Eocene, most likely the Priabonian. It inhabited an open ocean habitat with a significant deepwater component to the fauna.

== See also ==
- Prehistoric fish
- List of prehistoric bony fish
