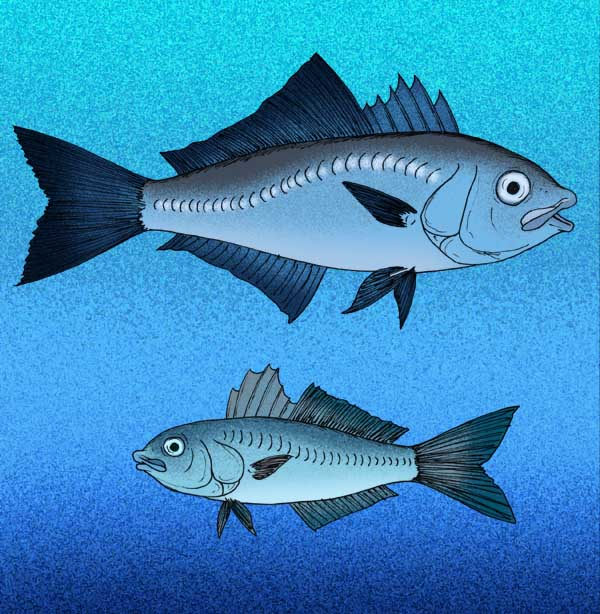
- A. glarisianus & "A. brevis"

Scientific classification
- Kingdom: Animalia
- Phylum: Chordata
- Class: Actinopterygii
- Order: Carangiformes
- Suborder: Carangoidei
- Family: Carangidae
- Genus: †Archaeus; Agassiz, 1844

Type species
- Archaeus glarisianus Agassiz 1844

Species
- See text

Synonyms
- Archaeoides Rath 1859

= Archaeus =

Archaeus Temporal range: Early Eocene to Early Oligocene, 56.0–28.1 Ma

Extinct genus of fishes

Archaeus (Greek for "ancient one") is an extinct genus of marine jackfish from the Paleogene of Europe, where it inhabited the former Tethys Ocean. The oldest species, A. oblongus is from the early Ypresian epoch of Eocene Turkmenistan, and the last species, A. glarisianus and A. solus, are from the early to middle Rupelian, of the Matt Formation of Canton Glarus, Switzerland and the Pshekha Formation of North Caucasus, Russia.

In life, Archaeus species would have resembled a small trevally, though, Archaeus had a proportionally smaller mouth, and larger eyes, and the tail was more fan-shaped, rather than crescent-shaped.

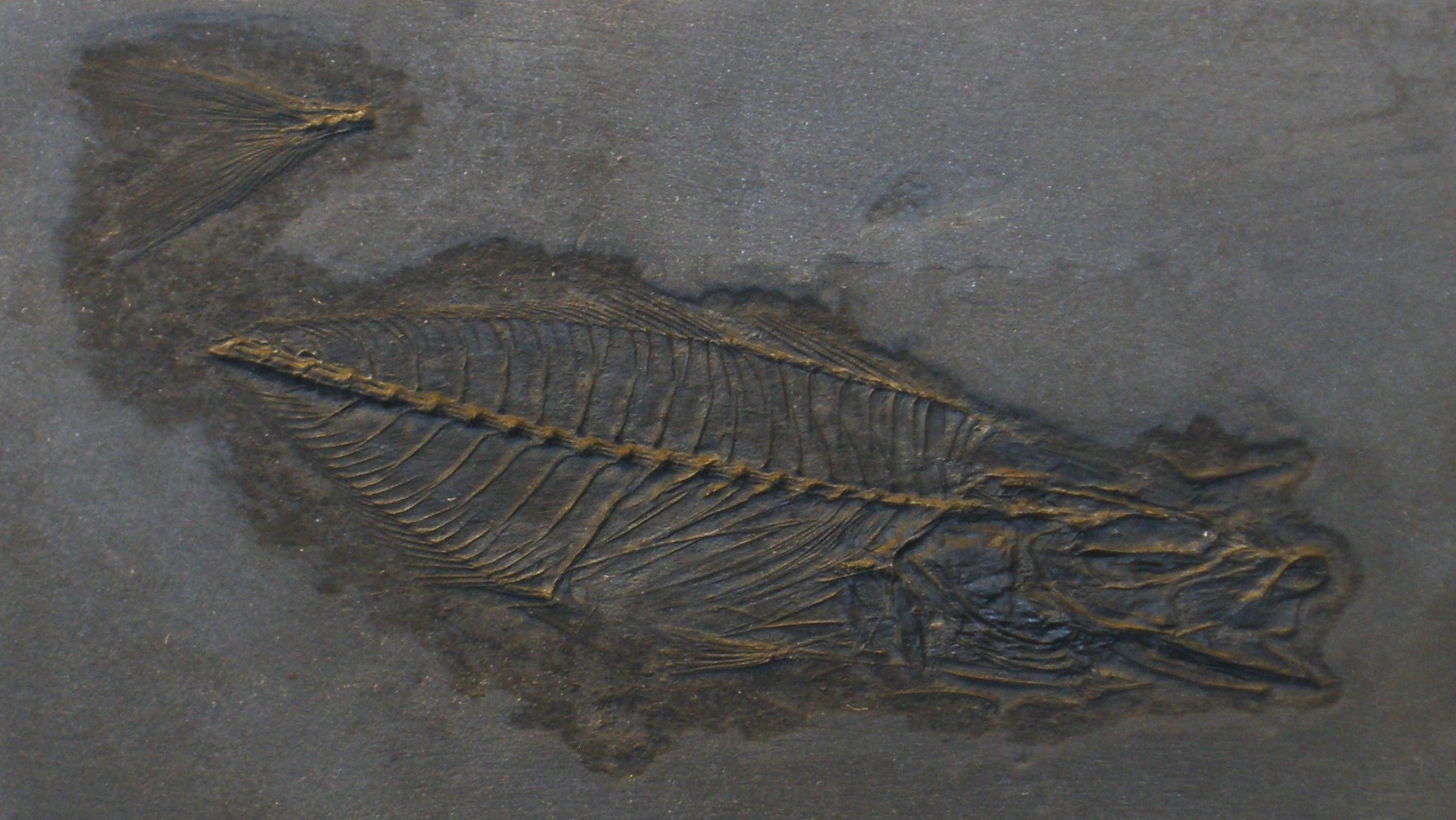
Fossil of A. glarisianus

The following species are known:

- A. glarisianus Agassiz, 1844 (Early Oligocene of Switzerland and Germany)
- A. oblongus Daniltshenko, 1968 (Early Eocene of Danata Formation, Turkmenistan)
- A. solus Bannikov & Erebakan, 2023 (Early Oligocene of North Caucasus, Russia)

The former species A. brevis is no longer considered valid. A specimen of A. glarisianus from the Oligocene of Abkhazia is now thought to represent an extinct species of Caranx, C. daniltshenkoi.

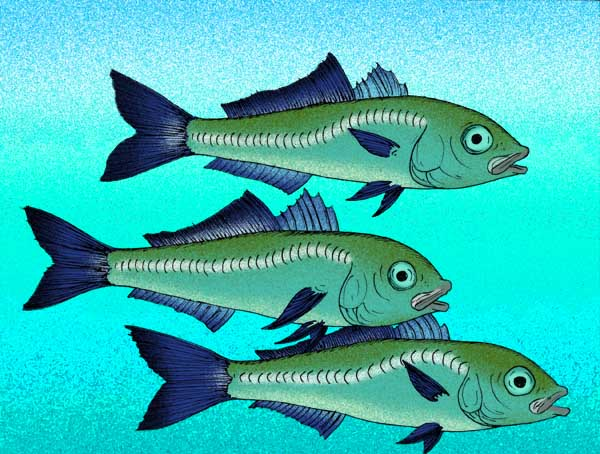
A. oblongus from Eocene Turkmenistan
