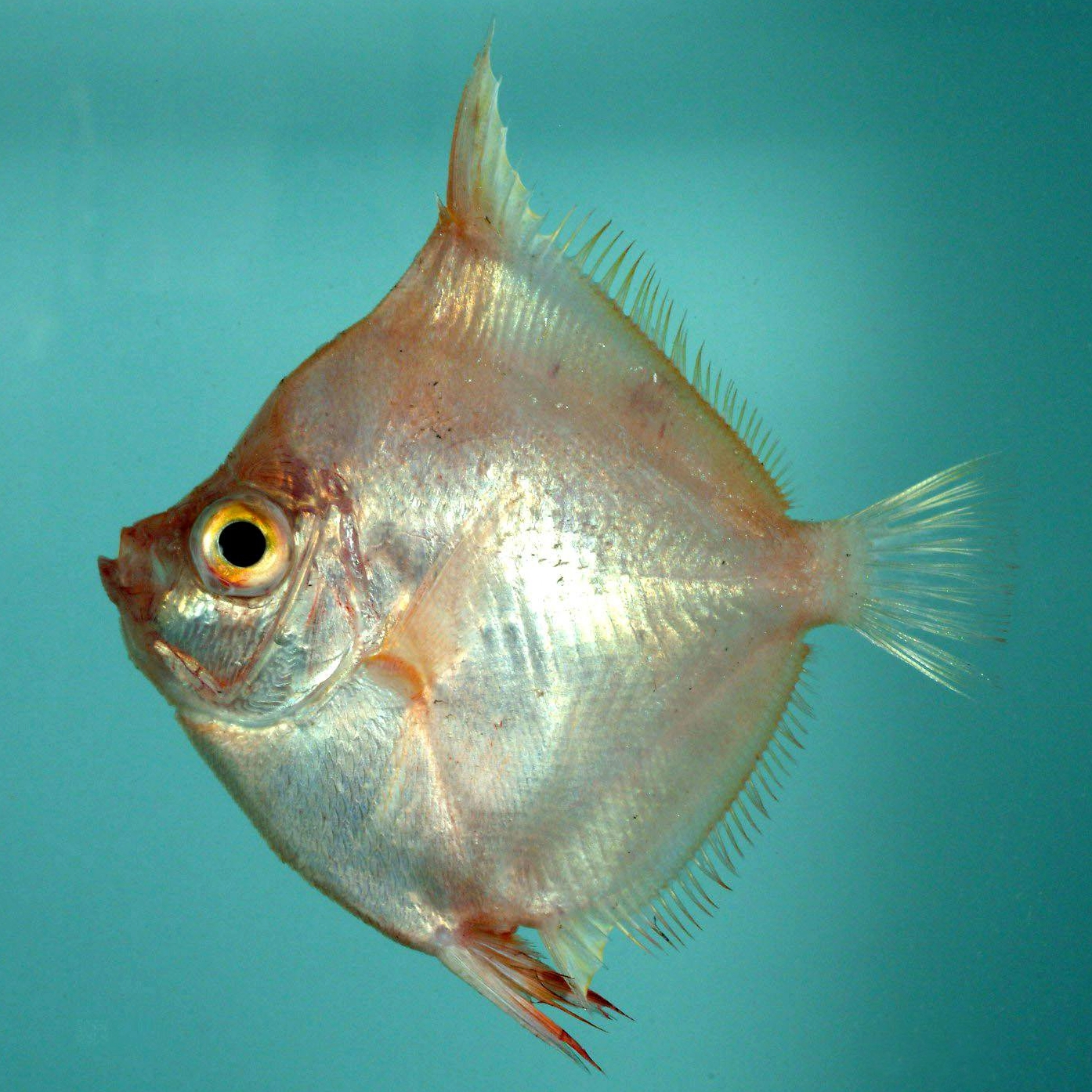
- Antigonia capros

Scientific classification
- Kingdom: Animalia
- Phylum: Chordata
- Class: Actinopterygii
- Order: Acanthuriformes
- Family: Antigoniidae; D. S. Jordan & Evermann, 1898

Genera
- see text

= Antigoniidae =

Antigoniidae Temporal range: Early Eocene to present

Subfamily of fishes

Antigoniidae, the deepwater boarfishes, is a family of marine ray-finned fishes belonging to the order Acanthuriformes. It contains a single extant genus. These fishes are found in the warmer oceans throughout the world.

== Taxonomy ==
Antigoniinae was first named as a taxonomic grouping in 1898 by the American ichthyologists David Starr Jordan and Barton Warren Evermann. The 5th edition of Fishes of the World classifies Antigoniinae as a subfamily of the Caproidae, within the order Caproiformes, as do other authorities. However, more recently, other authorities have classified this taxon as a distinct family, the Antigoniidae, and classify it and the Caproidae in the order Acanthuriformes.

The alleged relationship between Caproidae and Antigoniidae has always been poorly attested, and at least some recent studies suggest that this former classification was paraphyletic, with antigoniids being the sister group to the Lophiiformes and Tetraodontiformes, while caproids are sister to the Priacanthidae.

== Genera ==
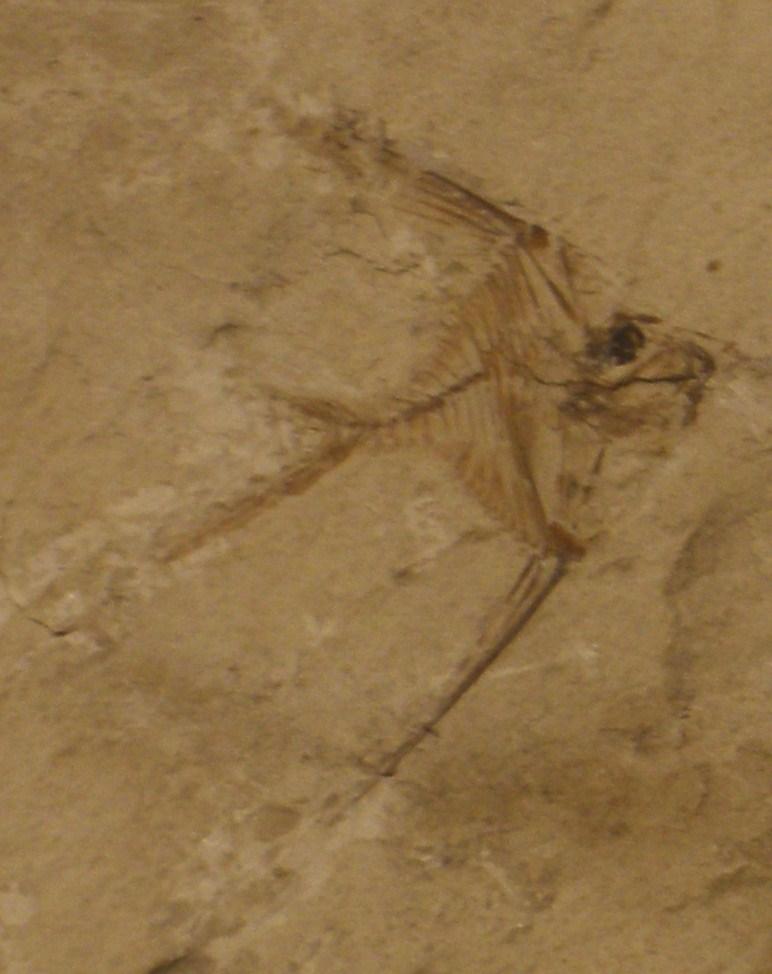
Eoantigonia fossil from the Early Eocene of Italy

Antigoniinae contains one extant and one extinct genera:

- Antigonia Lowe, 1843
- †Eoantigonia Baciu, Bannikov & Tyler, 2005 (Early Eocene of Italy)

Despite its name, †Proantigonia from the Oligocene and Miocene of Russia and Europe is more closely related to caproids.

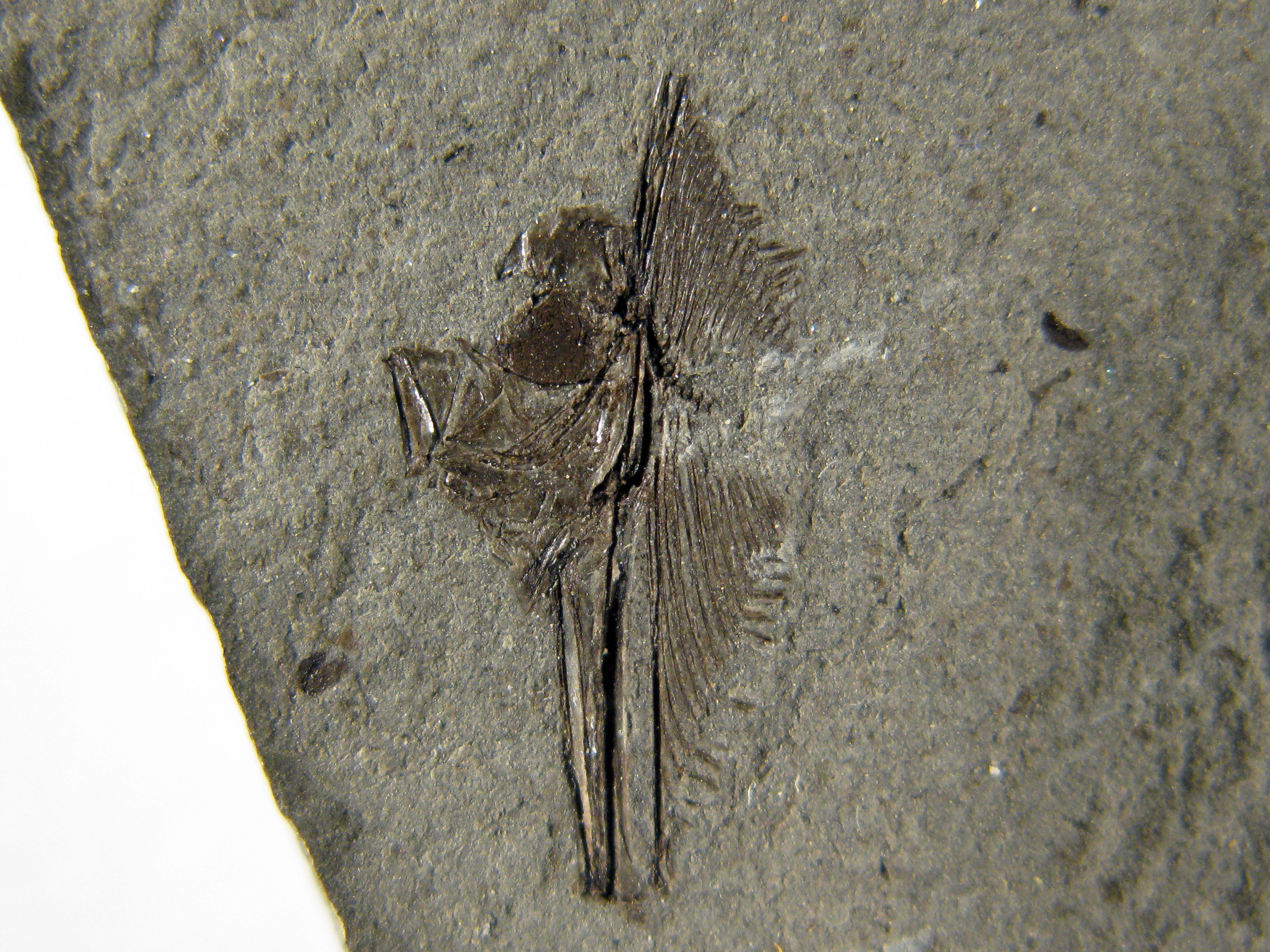
The indeterminate antigoniid-like fish fossil from the Fur Formation, Denmark

An unusual deep-bodied fossil fish, potentially the earliest known antigoniid, is known from the earliest Eocene-aged Fur Formation of Denmark; however, it does not preserve any of the distinguishing features of antigoniids, and its taxonomy thus remains unknown.

== Characteristics ==
Antigoniid boarfishes are predominantly red in colour and have very deep, compressed, rhomboid shaped bodies. Most of the scales on the body are clearly ridged, the ridge being high and curved on the rear of the scales. There are 8 or 9 spines in the dorsal fin and between 26 and 38 soft rays while the anal fin is supported by 3 spines which are separate from the soft rays in the fin. The caudal fin contains 10 branched rays. The maxillary process of the palatine is articulated with the forward end of the nasal bone. The largest species is the deepbody boarfish (Antigonia capros) with a maximum published total length of 30.5 cm (12.0 in) while the smallest is Antigonia kenyae at 4.4 cm (1.7 in).

== Distribution and habitat ==
Antigoniid boarfishes are found at depths between 50 and 600 m (160 and 1,970 ft).
