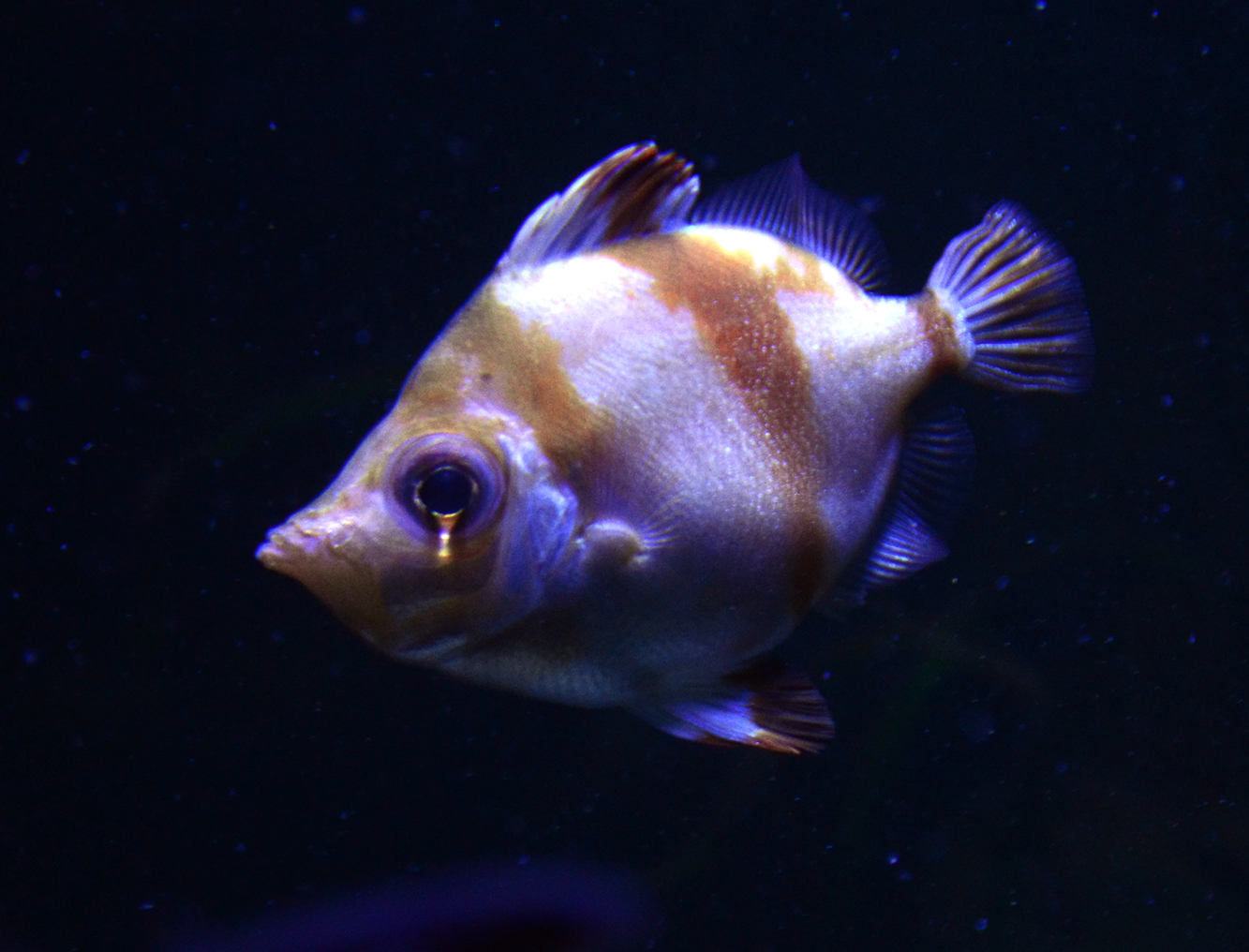
- Boarfish, Capros aper, the only extant species

Scientific classification
- Kingdom: Animalia
- Phylum: Chordata
- Class: Actinopterygii
- Order: Acanthuriformes
- Family: Caproidae; Bonaparte, 1835

Genera
- see text

= Caproidae =

Boarfishes Temporal range: Early Oligocene–present

Family of fishes

Caproidae, or boarfishes, are a small family of marine fishes with a single extant species, the boarfish (Capros aper), native to the northeastern Atlantic Ocean, as well as a few other extinct species and genera.

== Etymology ==
Caproidae comes from the genus name Capros which is derived from the Greek word kapros meanin "boar". This is a reference to the rather cylindrical snout, ending in a small mouth with a protrusible upper lip which Bonaparte thought had some resemblance to snout of a pig or boar.

== Taxonomy ==
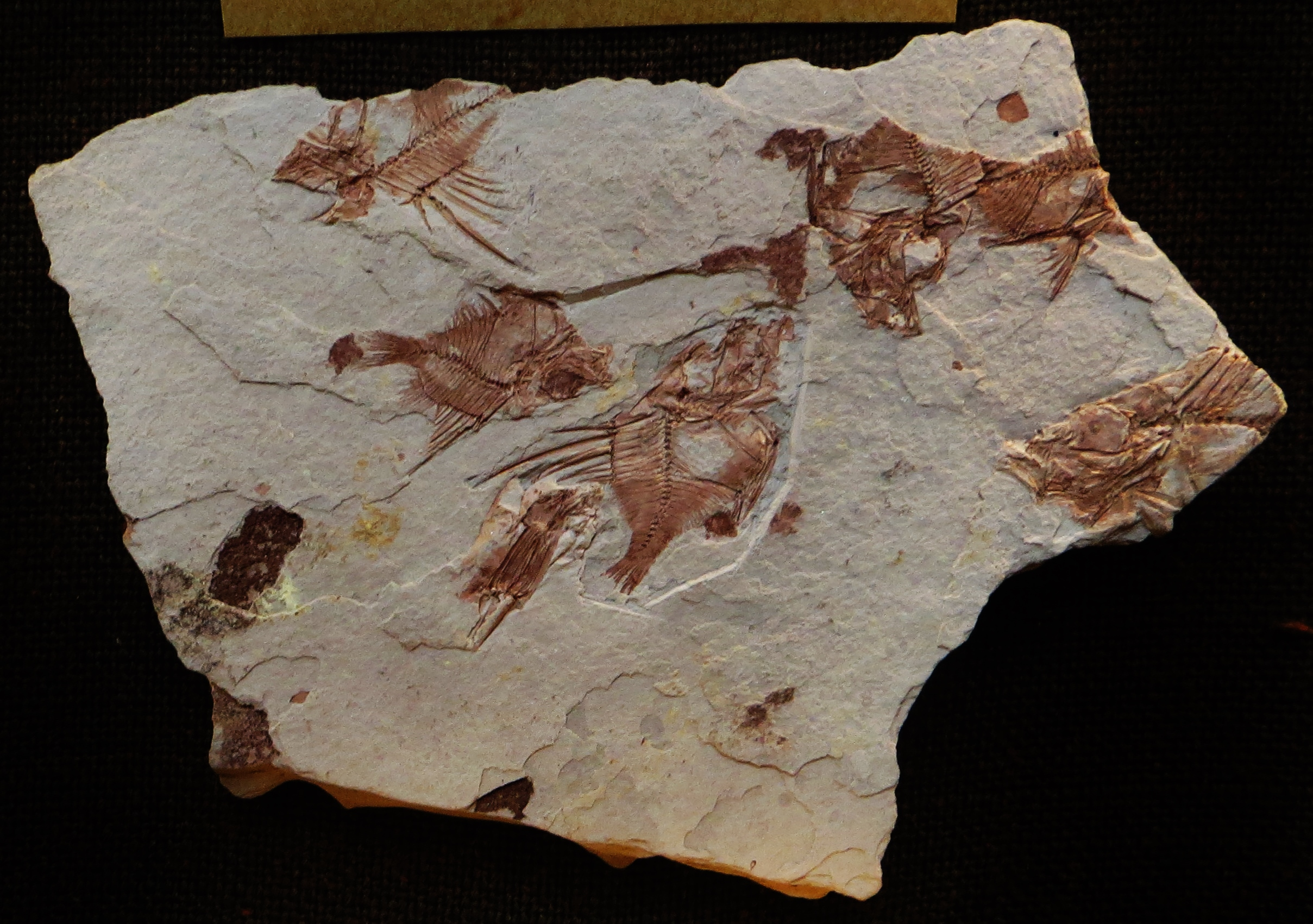
Fossil specimens of Capros rhenanus

Caproidae was first proposed as a family in 1835 by the French naturalist and ornithologist Charles Lucien Bonaparte. Caproidae was formerly placed in the order Zeiformes with the dories, but were later moved to Perciformes based on percoid characteristics of the caudal skeleton and other morphological evidence. More recent revisions of Percomorpha have seen them placed in Caproiformes or Acanthuriformes. Presently, Eschmeyer's Catalog of Fishes places them in the latter.

In the past, the deepwater boarfishes of the family Antigoniidae were placed in this family as the subfamily Antigoniinae. However, the monophyly of this classification has always been poorly attested, and presently Eschmeyer's Catalog of Fishes recognizes both as distinct families. At least some recent studies suggest that this former classification was paraphyletic, with antigoniids being the sister group to the Lophiiformes and Tetraodontiformes, while caproids are sister to the Priacanthidae.

Fossil remains of caproids are largely restricted to the Mediterranean and former Paratethyan region, suggesting that this region was important to the evolution of the group. The only surviving member, the boarfish, is also similarly restricted to the Mediterranean and eastern Atlantic, continuing the unique extent of the group's distribution.

=== Genera ===
Caproidae contains the following genera:

- Caproidae Bonaparte, 1835
  - Capros Lacépède, 1802
  - †Caprosimilis Bienkowska-Wasiluk & Bonde, 2015 (Early Oligocene of Poland)
  - †Proantigonia Kramberger, 1882 (Early Oligocene to Middle Miocene of Croatia, Romania, Ukraine, and North Caucasus, Russia)

== Characteristics ==
Caproidae are characterised by small ctenoid scales covering the body. They have between 7 and 9 spines in the dorsal fin, there are 2 or 3 spines in the anal fin while the pelvic fins have one spine and five soft rays. The caudal fin is rounded. They have an obvious sagittal crest and pleural ribs. The vertebrate count is 21 to 23. The boarfish (Capros aper) can grow up to 30 cm (12 in) long.

== See also ==
- Some fish of the family Pentacerotidae (order Perciformes) are also called boarfish.
