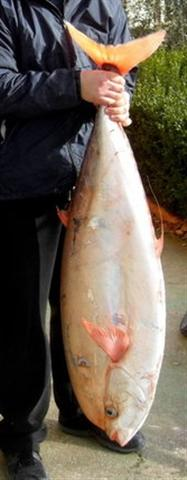

Conservation status
- Least Concern (IUCN 3.1)

Scientific classification
- Kingdom: Animalia
- Phylum: Chordata
- Class: Actinopterygii
- Division: Teleostei
- Order: Acanthuriformes
- Family: Luvaridae
- Genus: Luvarus
- Species: L. imperialis

Binomial name
- Luvarus imperialis Rafinesque, 1810

Synonyms
- List: Luvar imperialis Rafinesque, 1810; Luvaris imperialis Rafinesque, 1810; Proctostegus proctostegus Nardo, 1827; Proctostegus prototypus Nardo, 1827; Diana semilunata Risso, 1827; Ausonia cuvieri Risso, 1827; Astrodermus guttatus Cuvier, 1829; Astrodermus coryphaenoides Cuvier & Valenciennes, 1833; Coryphaena elegans Cuvier, 1833; Diana valenciennesii Cocco & Scuderi, 1835; Astrodermus elegans Bonaparte, 1839; Astroderma plumbeum Lowe, 1843

= Louvar =

Species of fish

The louvar or luvar (Luvarus imperialis) is a species of marine ray-finned fish, it is the only extant species in the genus Luvarus and family Luvaridae. This taxon is classified within the suborder Acanthuroidei, which includes the surgeonfish, of the order Acanthuriformes, and is the only pelagic species of this order. The juvenile form has a pair of spines near the base of the tail, like the surgeonfish, though they are lost in the adult.

== Taxonomy ==
The louvar was first formally described in 1810 by the French polymath Constantine Samuel Rafinesque with its type locality given as Sicily. Rafinesque described it as the only species in the monospecific genus Luvarus. It is the only extant species in the genus and in the family Luvaridae, the Luvaridae being proposed by Theodore Gill in 1885. The family is included in the suborder Acanthuroidei of the order Acanthuriformes.

== Etymology ==
The louvar's binomial Luvarus imperialis is based on the Sicilian name for this fish, Luvari imperiali, which was used because this species resembles the actual luvari, the common pandora (Pagellus erythrinus). The specific name imperialis means "imperial" or "majestic", perhaps referring to the palatability of its flesh.

== Description ==
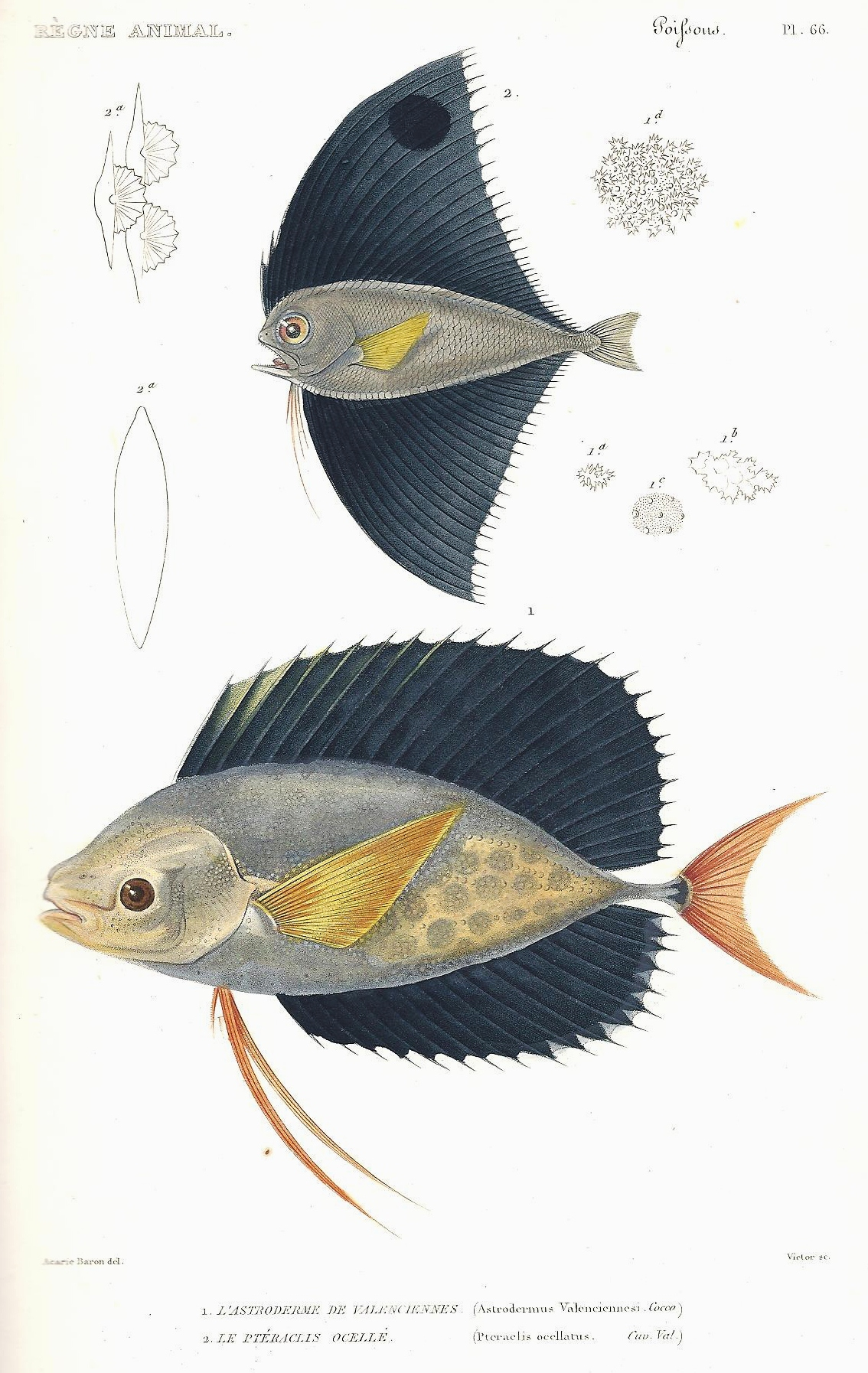
Juvenile (bottom)

The louvar has a robust, ovoid body tapering towards the caudal fin with a small mouth and eyes that are placed low on the head, behind the mouth and beneath a large bulging forehead. The anal and dorsal fins are long-based and are not tall and have no spines, the anal fin has 18 soft rays and the dorsal fins have 20. The caudal fin is large and concave with the slender caudal peduncle having either one or two keels close to the base of the caudal fin. The pelvic fins are tiny while the long pectoral fins have pointed tips. These fishes have a covering of rough skin with very small spines. The overall colour is a metallic bluish-grey with some pinkish or orange tint. The dorsal and caudal fins are reddish. The juveniles have longer dorsal and anal fins than the adults and the origin of these fins is closer to the head. They also have long pelvic fins and teeth in the jaws, features that are lost as they change to adults. The louvar has a maximum published total length of 200 cm (79 in), although 152 cm (60 in) is more typical, and a maximum weight of 150 kg (330 lb).

== Distribution and habitat ==
The louvar has an almost cosmopolitan tropical and temperate distribution. It is widespread in the Indo-Pacific region but in the Atlantic the distribution is more localised, although it appears to be less uncommon in the eastern Atlantic than it is in the western Atlantic, and there are a number of widely dispersed records from the Mediterranean. This is an oceanic or epipelagic species found near the surface or in deep water, down to 200 m (660 ft).

== Biology ==
Louvars are solitary carnivores feeding on soft-bodied zooplankton such as jellyfishes and ctenophores. They spawn from the late spring and throughout the summer and each female may lay millions of small pelagic eggs.

Studies of louvar anatomy indicate that they have evolved a highly complex system of red muscle akin to those of endothermic animals, of which there are very few known fish. However, it lacks a rete mirabile, unlike actual endotherms. It remains uncertain whether the species may ultimately evolve true endothermy or remain an ectotherm.

== Fisheries ==
Louvars are very rare and are not targeted by fisheries and are normally taken as bycatch. For example, they are hardly ever found in fish markets in the United States, only as bycatch, but is prized as an eating fish. Fish are often removed from markets because of their high parasite load.
