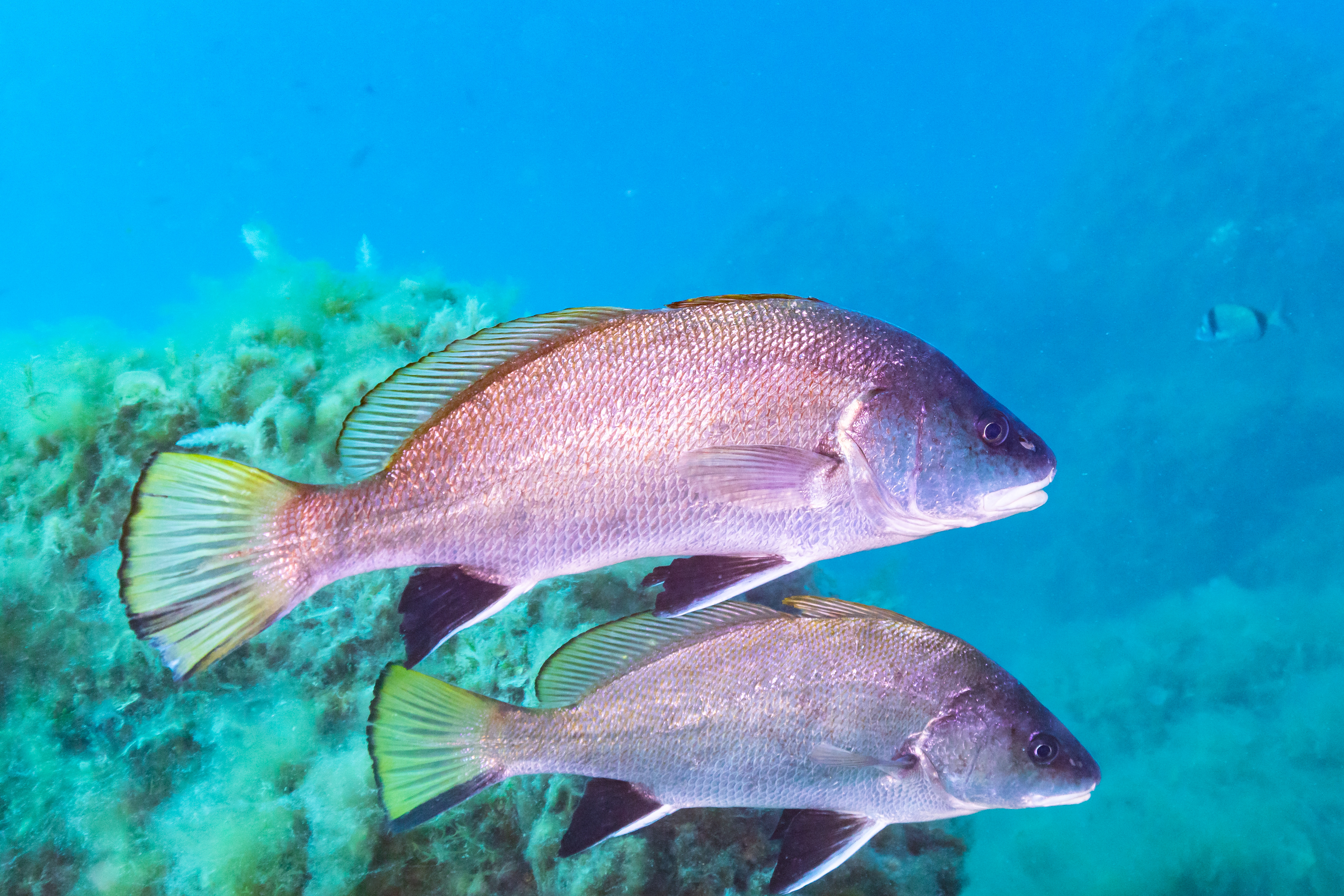
- Brown meagre (Sciaena umbra)
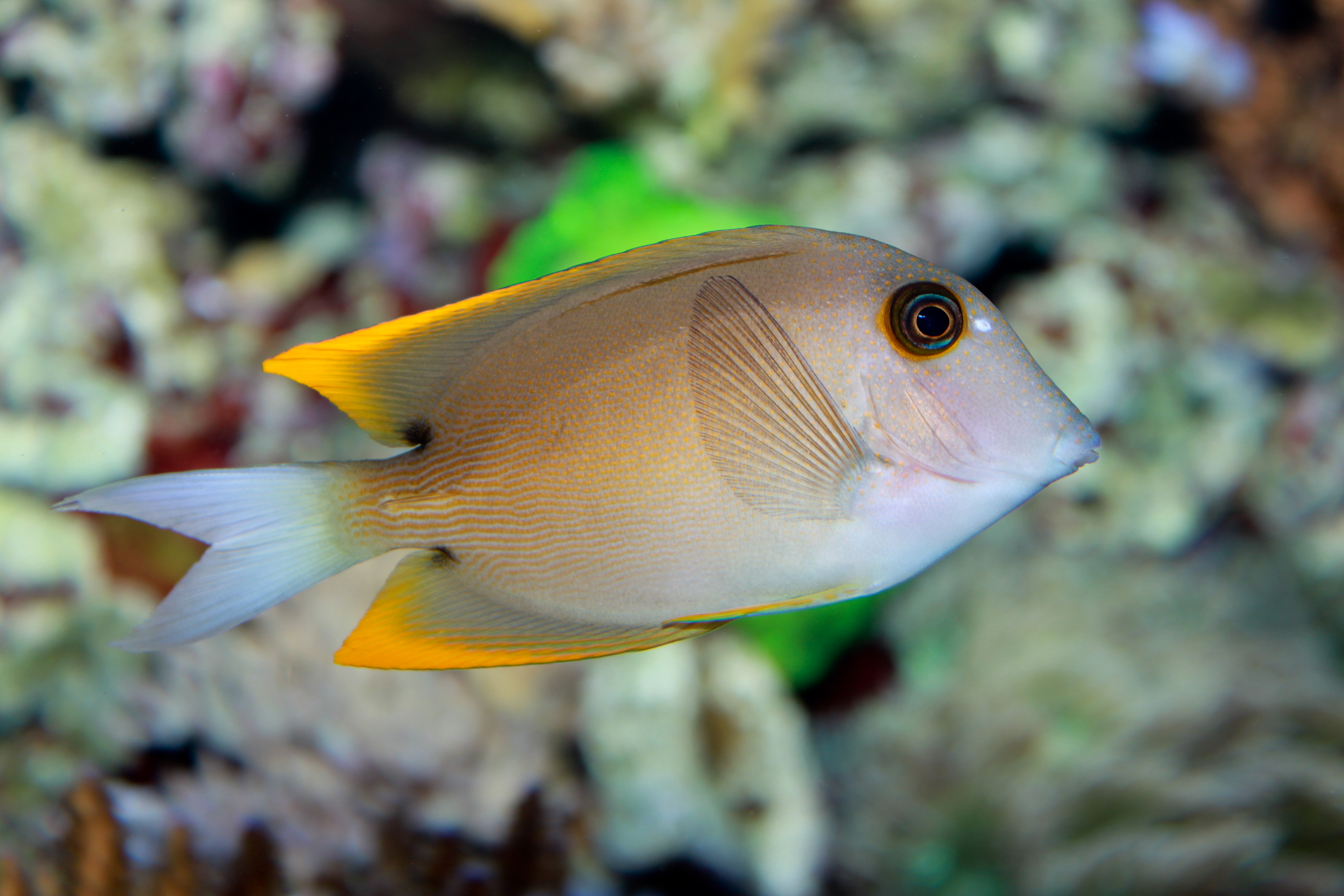
- Ctenochaetus tominiensis

Scientific classification
- Kingdom: Animalia
- Phylum: Chordata
- Class: Actinopterygii
- Division: Teleostei
- Clade: Percomorpha
- Clade: Eupercaria
- Order: Acanthuriformes; Jordan, 1923

Type species
- Acanthurus triostegus (Linnaeus, 1758)

Families
- See text

Cladistically included but traditionally excluded taxa
- Lophiiformes; Tetraodontiformes

Synonyms
- Chaetodontiformes; Caproiformes; Ephippiformes; Lobotiformes; Lutjaniformes; Moroniformes; Priacanthiformes; Spariformes

= Acanthuriformes =

Acanthuriformes Temporal range: Late Paleocene–present

Order of ray-finned fishes

Acanthuriformes is a large, diverse order of mostly marine ray-finned fishes, part of the Percomorpha clade. In the past, members of this clade were placed in the suborders Acanthuroidea and Percoidea of the order Perciformes, but this treatment is now considered paraphyletic.

This order contains many of the iconic tropical reef fish groups, such as surgeonfish, marine angelfish, butterflyfish, rabbitfish, grunts, and snappers. It also contains widespread, economically important food and sport fishes, such as drums, temperate basses, and porgies. The only pelagic member of the group is the louvar.

== Etymology ==
The name comes from Ancient Greek ἄκανθα (ákantha), meaning "spine", οὐρά (ourá), and Latin formes, meaning "form".

== Classification ==
The following classification is based on Eschmeyer's Catalog of Fishes (2025):

- Order Acanthuriformes
  - Family Gerreidae Bleeker, 1859 (mojarras)
  - Family Sillaginidae Richardson, 1846 (sillagos)
  - Family Moronidae Jordan & Evermann, 1896 (temperate basses)
  - Family Drepaneidae Gill, 1872 (sicklefishes)
  - Family Ephippidae Bleeker, 1859 (spadefishes & batfishes)
  - Family Sciaenidae Cuvier, 1829 (croakers & drums)
  - Family Dinopercidae Heemstra & Hecht, 1986 (cavebasses)
  - Family Haemulidae Gill, 1885 (grunts)
  - Family Lobotidae Gill, 1861 (tripletails and tigerperches)
  - Family Monodactylidae Jordan & Evermann, 1898 (moonies)
  - Family Emmelichthyidae Poey, 1867 (rovers)
  - Family Lutjanidae Gill, 1861 (snappers)
  - Family Malacanthidae Poey, 1861 (tilefishes or sand tilefishes)
  - Family Latilidae Gill, 1862 (deepwater tilefishes)
  - Family Pomacanthidae Jordan & Evermann, 1898 (angelfishes)
  - Family Chaetodontidae Rafinesque, 1815 (butterflyfishes)
  - Family Leiognathidae Gill, 1893 (ponyfishes or slipmouths)
  - Family Luvaridae Gill, 1885 (louvar)
  - Family Zanclidae Bleeker, 1876 (Moorish idols)
  - Family Acanthuridae Bonaparte, 1835 (surgeonfishes & unicornfishes)
  - Family Callanthiidae Ogilby, 1899 (splendid perches)
  - Family Nemipteridae Regan, 1913 (threadfin breams and spinycheeks)
  - Family Lethrinidae Bonaparte, 1831 (emperor snappers)
  - Family Sparidae Rafinesque, 1818 (porgys and seabreams)
  - Family Siganidae Richardson, 1837 (rabbitfishes)
  - Family Scatophagidae Gill, 1883 (scats)
  - Family Cepolidae Rafinesque, 1815 (bandfishes)
  - Family Priacanthidae Günther, 1859 (bigeyes)
  - Family Caproidae Bonaparte, 1835 (boarfishes)
  - Family Antigoniidae Jordan & Evermann, 1898 (deepwater boarfishes)

In the past, the rovers and drums were included within the suborder Sciaenoidei within the Acanthuriformes. However, this placement causes the group to be paraphyletic. Some authors have resolved this by placing the two families included in that suborder as incertae sedis in the Eupercaria, but others have resolved this by placing even more families within the order, the latter of which is followed by the Catalog of Fishes.

Some authors also lump the Lophiiformes and Tetraodontiformes within this group as the suborders Lophioidei and Tetraodontoidei, because Acanthuriformes is otherwise paraphyletic. However, they are presently retained as distinct orders by taxonomic authorities.

=== Fossil taxa ===
The following extinct groups are also known:

- Family †Acanthonemidae Bannikov, 1991
- Family †Kushlukiidae Daniltshenko, 1968
- Family †Massalongiidae Tyler & Bannikov, 2005
- Family †Sorbinipercidae Tyler, 1998
- Family †Zorzinichthyidae Tyler & Bannikov, 2002

== Phylogeny ==
Cladogram from Near & Thacker, 2024:

- Acanthuriformes
  - Gerreidae
  - - - Moronidae
      - Sillaginidae
    - - - Drepane
        - Ephippidae
      - - - Sciaenidae
          - - Dinopercidae
            - Haemulidae
        - - - Lobotidae
            - Monodactylus
          - - - Emmelichthyidae
              - - Lutjanidae
                - Malacanthidae
            - - - - Pomacanthidae
                  - - Chaetodontidae
                    - Leiognathidae
                - - Acanthuroidei
                    - - pan‑luvarids
                        - †Kushlukia
                        - - †Avitoluvarus
                          - Luvarus imperialis
                    - - pan‑zanclids
                        - †Massalongius
                        - Zanclus cornutus
                      - pan‑acanthurids
                        - - †Gazolaichthys
                          - †Padvoathurus
                        - Acanthuridae
              - - - Callanthiidae
                  - - Nemipteridae
                    - - Lethrinidae
                      - Sparidae
                - - - pan‑siganids
                      - †Ruffoichthys
                      - - †Eosiganus
                        - - †Siganopygaeus
                          - - †Protosiganus
                            - Siganus
                  - - - - Cepolidae
                        - Priacanthidae
                      - - pan‑scatophagids
                          - - †Eoscatophagus
                            - †Oligoscatophagus
                          - Scatophagidae
                    - - - pan‑caproids
                          - †Caprosimilis
                          - Caproidae
                      - - Lophioidei
                        - Tetraodontoidei
