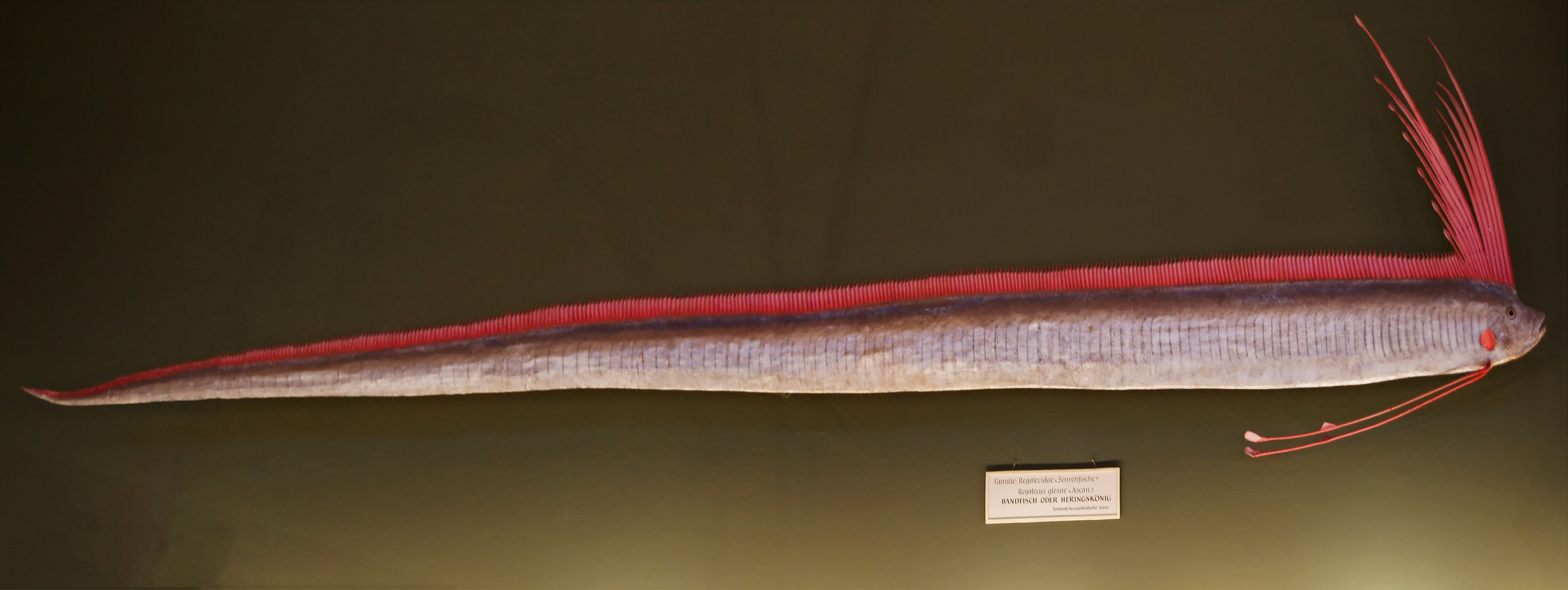
- Giant oarfish (Regalecus glesne)
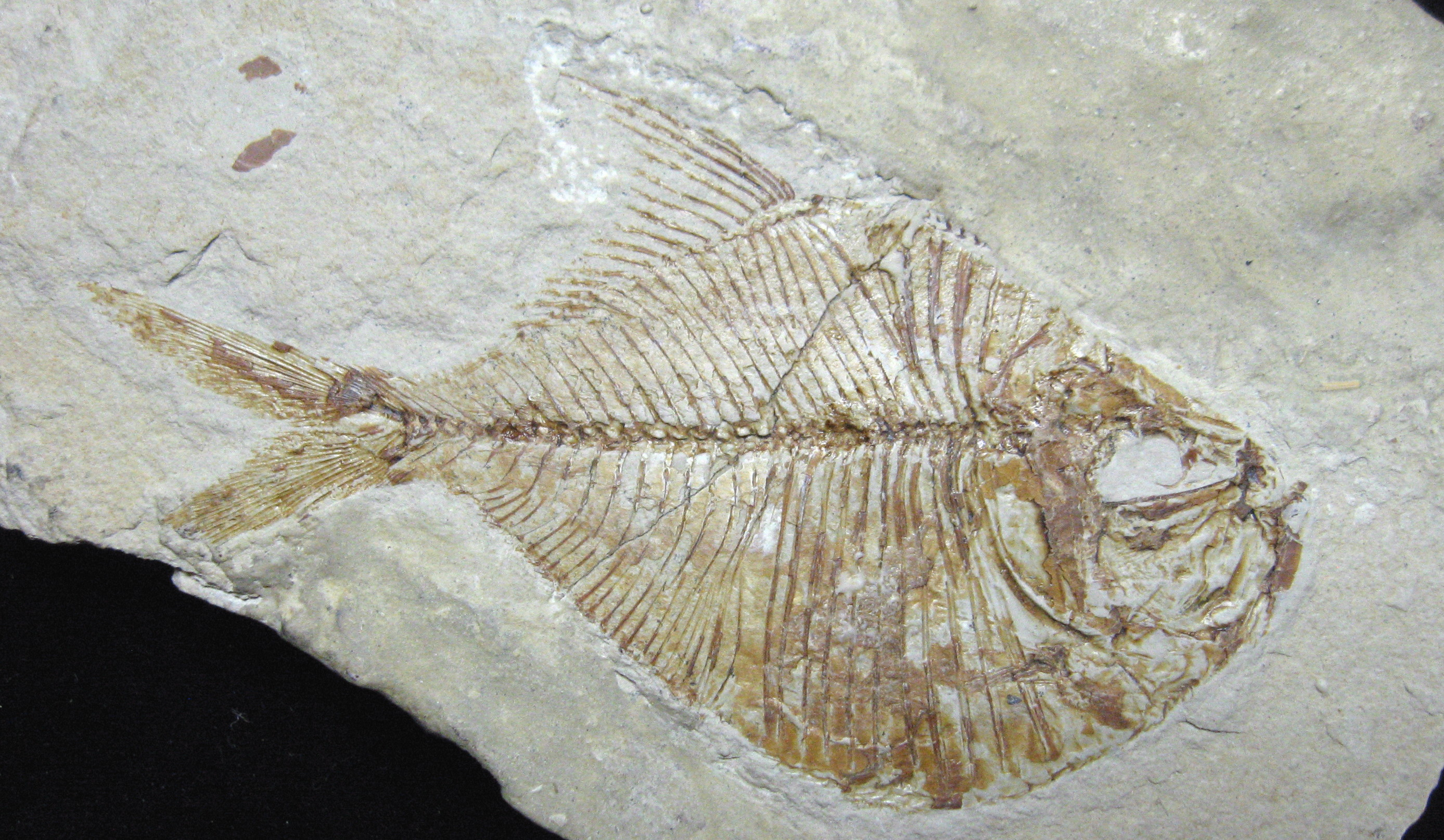
- Fossil of "Aipichthys" velifer

Scientific classification
- Domain: Eukaryota
- Kingdom: Animalia
- Phylum: Chordata
- Class: Actinopterygii
- Clade: Acanthomorpha
- Superorder: Lamprimorpha; Davesne et al, 2014

Subdivisions
- Lampriformes; †Aipichthyidae; †Aipichthyoididae; †Pharmacichthyidae; †Pycnosteroididae; Others, see text

Synonyms
- Lampridomorpha Davesne et al, 2014; Lampripterygii Betancur et al, 2017

= Lamprimorpha =

Lamprimorpha Temporal range: Cenomanian–present

Superorder of marine ray-finned fishes

Lamprimorpha is a superorder of marine ray-finned fishes, representing a basal group of the highly diverse clade Acanthomorpha. Represented today only by the order Lampriformes (containing oarfish, crestfish, and opahs, among others), recent studies have recovered other basal fossil species of the group (most of which were previously classified in other clades) dating as far back as the Cenomanian stage of the Late Cretaceous. Some of these fossil taxa, such as the paraphyletic genus Aipichthys, are among the oldest known fossil acanthomorphs, and overall they appear to have been a major component of the marine fish fauna at that time. Lamprimorpha is thought to be the sister group to the superorder Paracanthopterygii, which contains cod, dories, and trout-perches; however, Lamprimorpha may instead be sister to Acanthopterygii.

It was initially described as Lampridomorpha, although this is considered a misspelling by Fishes of the World, which refers to it as Lamprimorpha. Also synonymous with the group is the division Lampripterygii.

== Taxonomy ==
The following taxa are known:

- Genus †Freigichthys
- Genus †Zoqueichthys
- Family †Pharmacichthyidae
- Family †Pycnosteroididae? (alternatively considered stem-paracanthopterygians)
- Superfamily †Aipichthyoidea
  - Family †Aipichthyidae
  - Family †Aipichthyoididae
- Order Lampriformes
  - Genus †Nardovelifer
  - Genus †Whitephippus
  - Suborder Bathysomi
    - Genus †Bathysoma
    - Genus †Palaeocentrotus
    - Genus †Veronavelifer
    - Genus †Wettonius
    - Family Lampridae
    - Family †Turkmenidae
    - Family Veliferidae
  - Suborder Taeniosomi
    - Family Lophotidae
    - Family Radiicephalidae
    - Family Trachipteridae
    - Family Regalecidae
