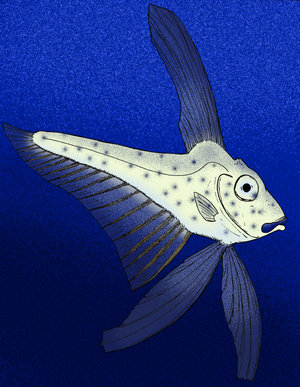
- Life restoration

Scientific classification
- Kingdom: Animalia
- Phylum: Chordata
- Class: Actinopterygii
- Division: Teleostei
- Order: Zeiformes
- Family: †Bajaichthyidae; Bannikov & Sorbini in Bannikov, 2014
- Genus: †Bajaichthys; Sorbini, 1983
- Species: †B. elegans

Binomial name
- †Bajaichthys elegans Sorbini, 1983

= Bajaichthys =

Bajaichthys Temporal range: Ypresian, 50–49 Ma

Extinct genus of fishes

Bajaichthys is an extinct Ypresian (early Eocene) zeid from the Monte Bolca Lagerstätten of Italy. It contains a single species, B. elegans, and is the only member of the family Bajaichthyidae.

== Anatomy and appearance ==
The holotype is four centimeters in length. It has a deep, oblong-shaped body, a deep, but short head, a long tail composed of 27 caudal vertebrae, a long, crest-like dorsal fin, a long, banner-like anal fin with 29 to 30 rays running from the posterior region of the body down the entire length of the tail, and two enormous, wing-like pelvic fins.

The holotype (and only known specimen) was originally described as the remains of a larval ("youthful") form due to its small size and due to its strong similarity to the larval form of trachypterid ribbonfish.

== Taxonomic status ==
Bajaichthys elegans' taxonomic has been debated since its description in 1983. Because it appeared to combine features of both taeniosomid lamprids (i.e., its larval form resembles those of oarfish and ribbonfish), and of bathysomid lamprids (the anatomy of the pelvis is extremely similar to that of sailfins), it was attributed to an incertae sedis position within Lampriformes. Further research placed it within Zeiformes, another group of acanthomorph teleosts. It is thought to be the second most basal member of the order, behind Archaeozeus.
