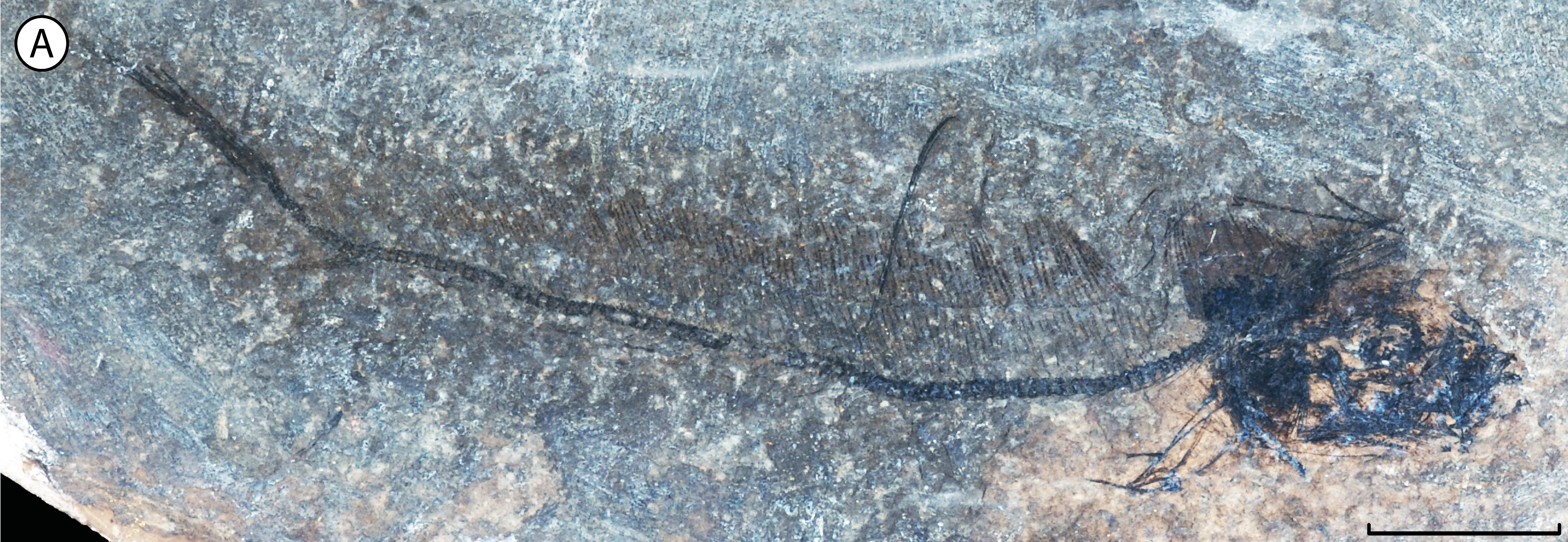
- E. lenis holotype, scale bar = 5 mm

Scientific classification
- Kingdom: Animalia
- Phylum: Chordata
- Class: Actinopterygii
- Order: Lampriformes
- Family: Lophotidae
- Genus: †Eolophotes; Daniltshenko, 1980
- Species: †E. lenis

Binomial name
- †Eolophotes lenis (Daniltshenko, 1962)

Synonyms
- †Lophotes lenis Daniltshenko, 1962

= Eolophotes =

Eolophotes Temporal range: Middle Eocene, Lutetian

Extinct genus of fishes

Eolophotes ("dawn Lophotes") is an extinct genus of prehistoric crestfish that inhabited the northeastern Tethys Ocean during the Eocene. It contains a single species, E. lenis, known from the Lutetian-aged Dabakhan Formation of Georgia. It is a diminutive, poorly-known species, but represents the oldest fossil record of the group. However, Brownstein & Near (2023) found the Lophotidae to be potentially non-monophyletic, and Eolophotes to be a member of the Taeniosomi with uncertain placement.
