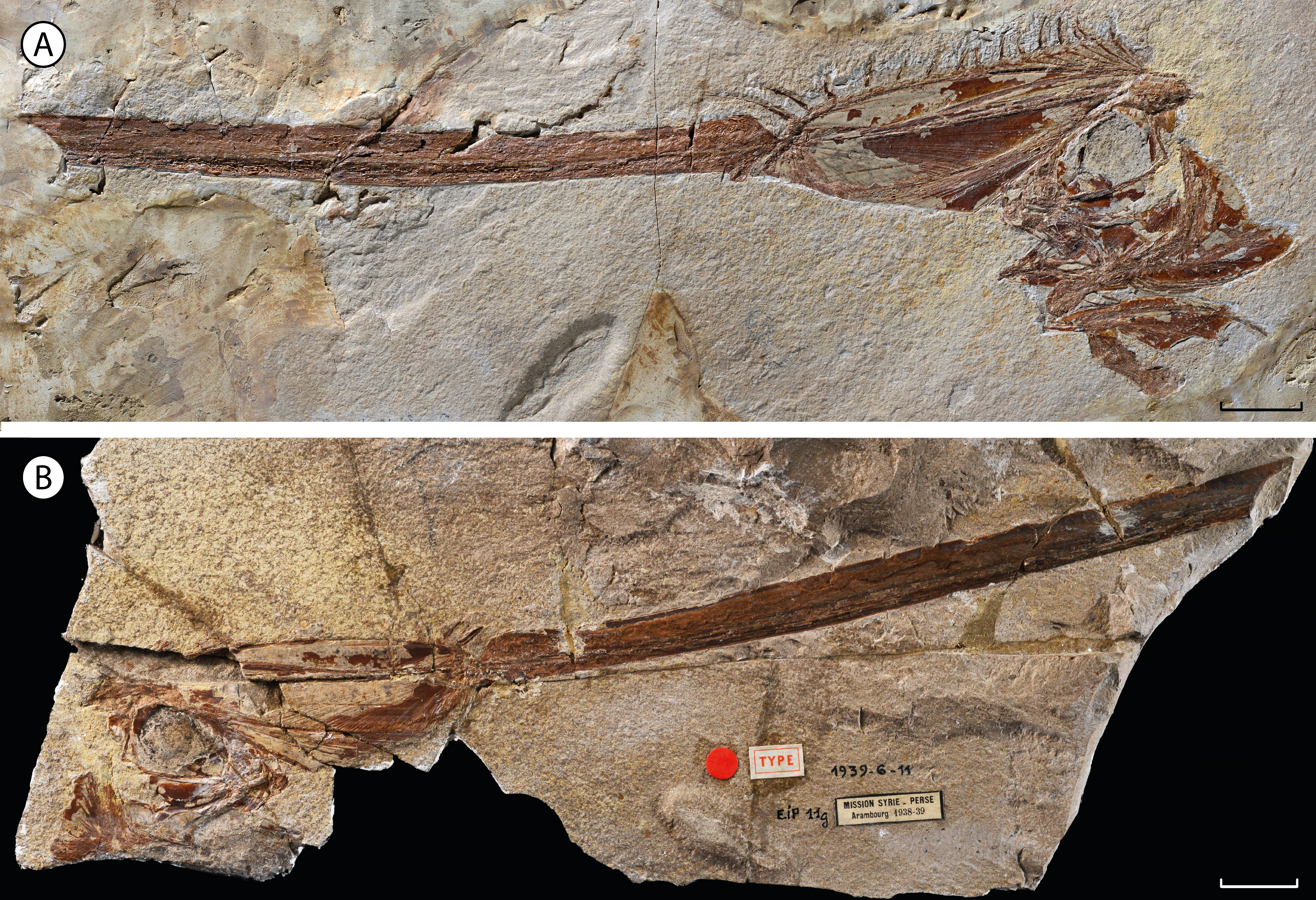
- Part and counterpart slabs. (Scale bar = 20 mm)

Scientific classification
- Kingdom: Animalia
- Phylum: Chordata
- Class: Actinopterygii
- Order: Lampriformes
- Family: Lophotidae
- Genus: †Babelichthys; Davesne, 2017
- Species: †B. olneyi

Binomial name
- †Babelichthys olneyi Davesne, 2017

= Babelichthys =

Babelichthys Temporal range: Late Eocene, ?Priabonian

Extinct genus of crestfish

Babelichthys is an extinct genus of crestfish (Lophotidae) from what is thought to be the Late Eocene-aged Pabdeh Formation of Western Iran. It contains a single species, Babelichthys olneyi. The type specimen was initially figured by Camille Arambourg as a second, more poorly-preserved specimen of the crestfish Protolophotus, which is found in the same geologic formation. However, it was identified as its own distinct taxon in 2017.

== Etymology ==
The genus name Babelichthys literally translates to "Babel fish" in Greek, named after the teleost-like, ear-dwelling, polyglot, extraterrestrial species from The Hitchhiker's Guide to the Galaxy series of novels. The name was chosen as a reference to the very peculiar, almost alien-like, appearance of the genus. The species name "olneyi" is named after John E. Olney for his work on the anatomy and ontogeny of Lampriformes.

== Description ==
The single-known specimen consists of a head and the front-most region of the dorsal fin: preserving the extremely elongated and enlarged first dorsal-fin ray. It has been inferred that Babelichthys had a highly elongated "crest" at the front of its dorsal fin that projected horizontally forwards like a horn, akin to that of the extant unicorn crestfish (Eumecichthys fiski) but even larger and more elongated.

It and the unicorn crestfish are each other's closest known relatives. However, some studies find Lophotidae to be paraphyletic, and place Babelichthys as an indeterminate taeniosome.

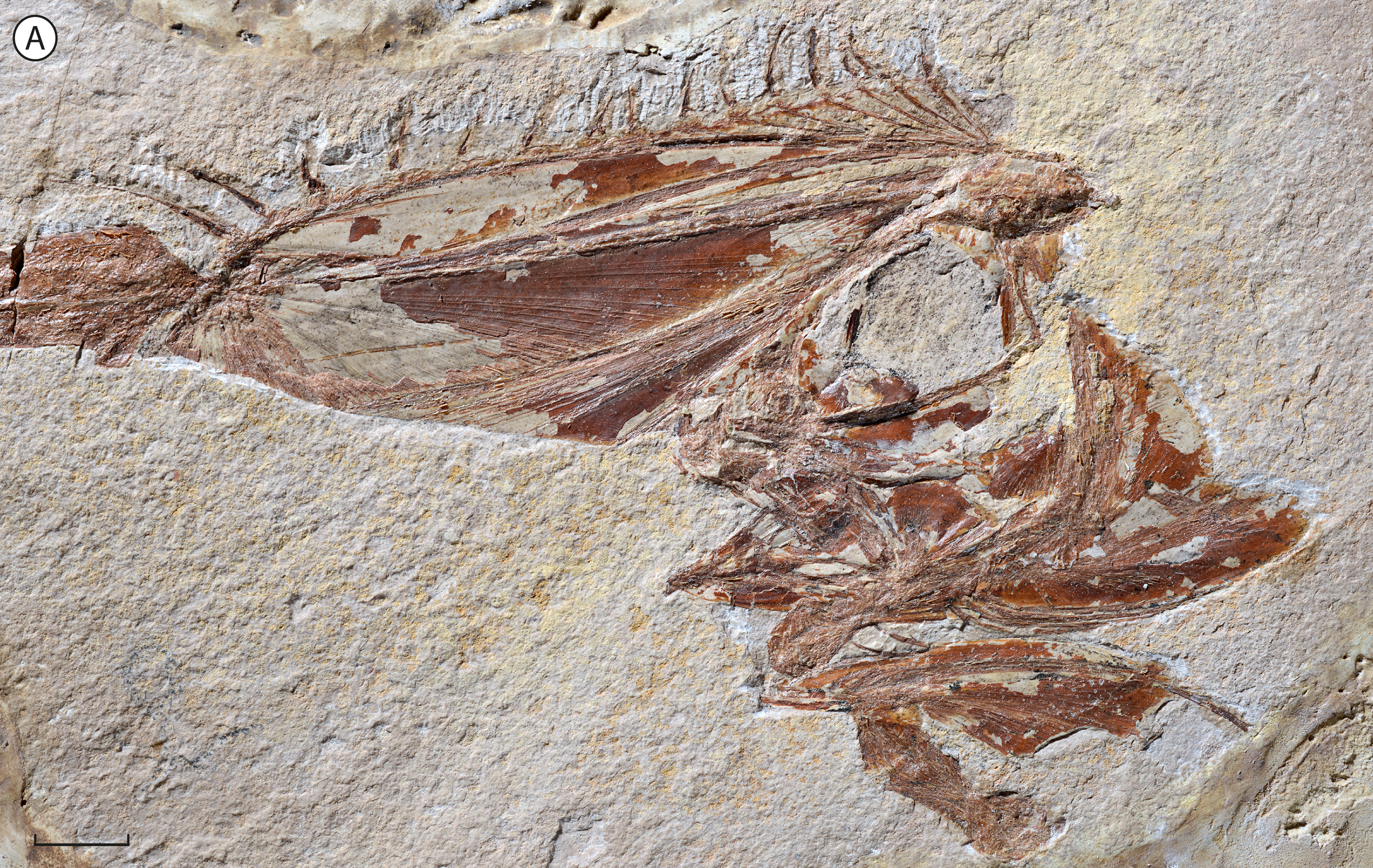
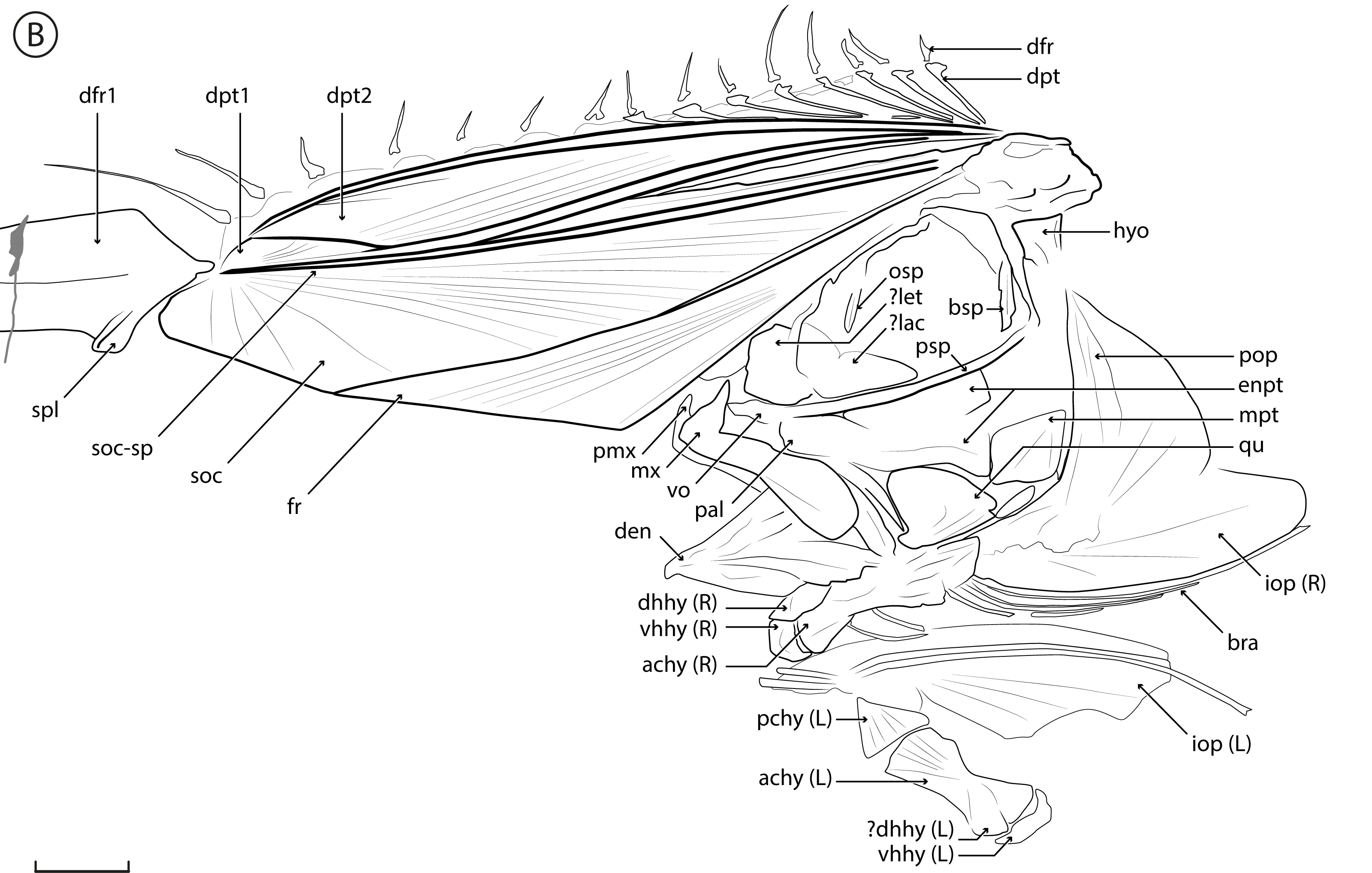
Scale bar = 10 mm
