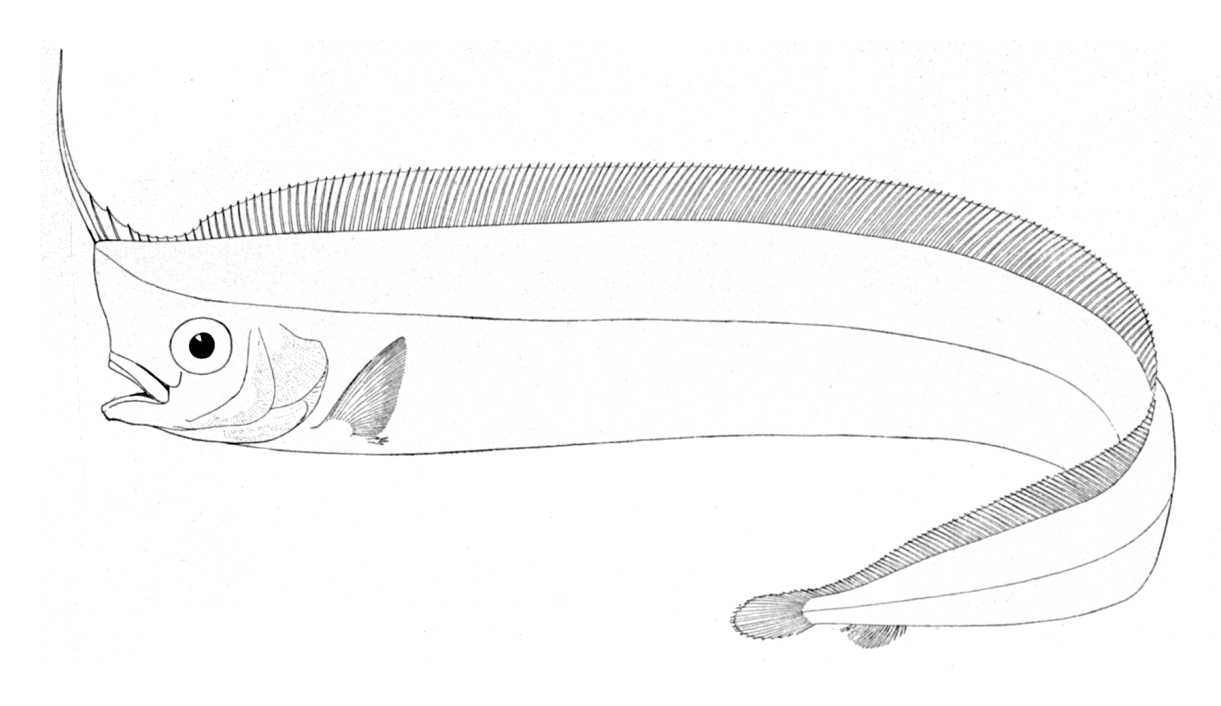

Conservation status
- Least Concern (IUCN 3.1)

Scientific classification
- Kingdom: Animalia
- Phylum: Chordata
- Class: Actinopterygii
- Division: Teleostei
- Order: Lampriformes
- Family: Lophotidae
- Genus: Lophotus
- Species: L. capellei

Binomial name
- Lophotus capellei Temminck & Schlegel, 1845

= North Pacific crestfish =

Species of fish

The North Pacific crestfish or unicornfish (Lophotus capellei) is a crestfish of the genus Lophotus, found in the tropical and subtropical waters of the Pacific and Atlantic oceans, in a depth of 0–100 m. Its length is up to 2 m.
