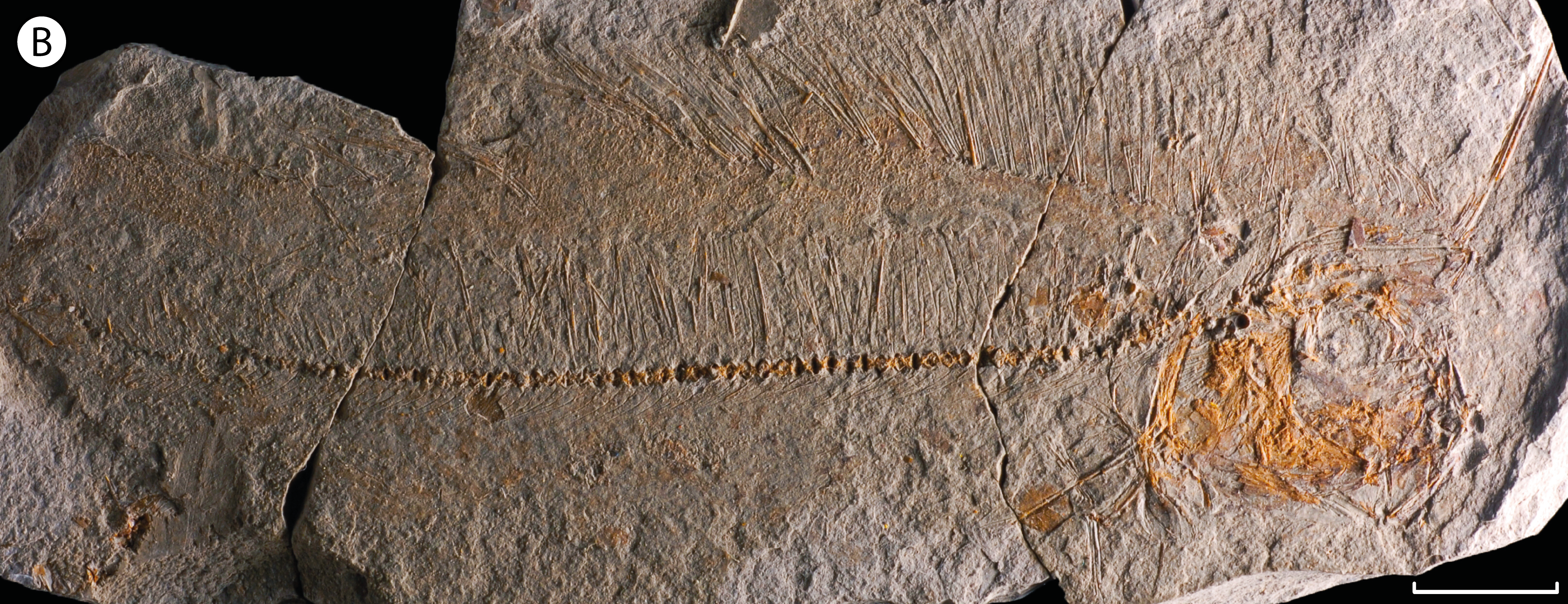
- Holotype, scale bar = 10 mm

Scientific classification
- Kingdom: Animalia
- Phylum: Chordata
- Class: Actinopterygii
- Order: Lampriformes
- Family: Lophotidae
- Genus: †Oligolophotes; Bannikov, 1999

Type species
- †Oligolophotes fragosus Bannikov, 1999

= Oligolophotes =

Oligolophotes Temporal range: Early Oligocene

Extinct genus of fishes

Oligolophotes is an extinct genus of fish from the Early Oligocene of the bank of Belaya River in Adygea, the Caucasus Mountains. There is one species, Oligolophotes fragosus, known from the holotype that is estimated to have measured 122 mm (4.8 in) in body length.
