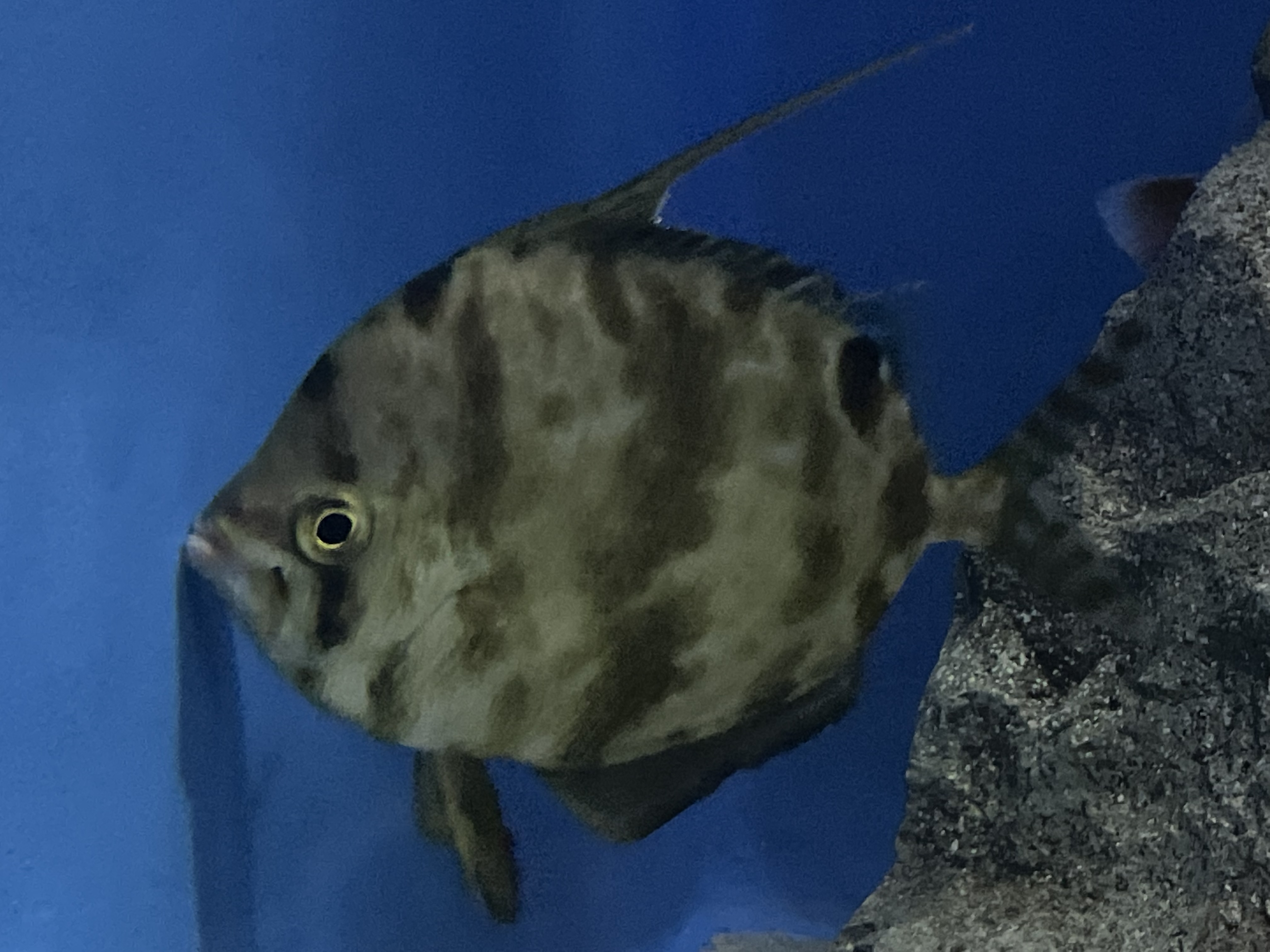
- Adult
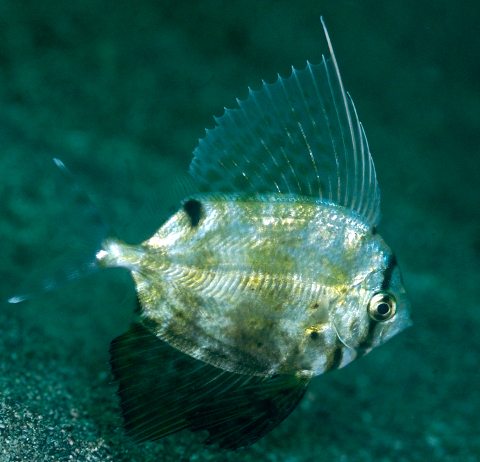
- Juvenile

Conservation status
- Least Concern (IUCN 3.1)

Scientific classification
- Kingdom: Animalia
- Phylum: Chordata
- Class: Actinopterygii
- Order: Lampriformes
- Family: Veliferidae
- Genus: Metavelifer; Walters, 1960
- Species: M. multiradiatus

Binomial name
- Metavelifer multiradiatus (Regan, 1907)

= Metavelifer =

Metavelifer multiradiatus

Species of fish

Metavelifer is a genus of fishes in the family Veliferidae. It is monotypic, being represented by the single species Metavelifer multiradiatus, commonly known as the spinyfin velifer. It grows to a length of 28 centimetres (11 in) TL and is found in the Indian and Pacific Oceans.

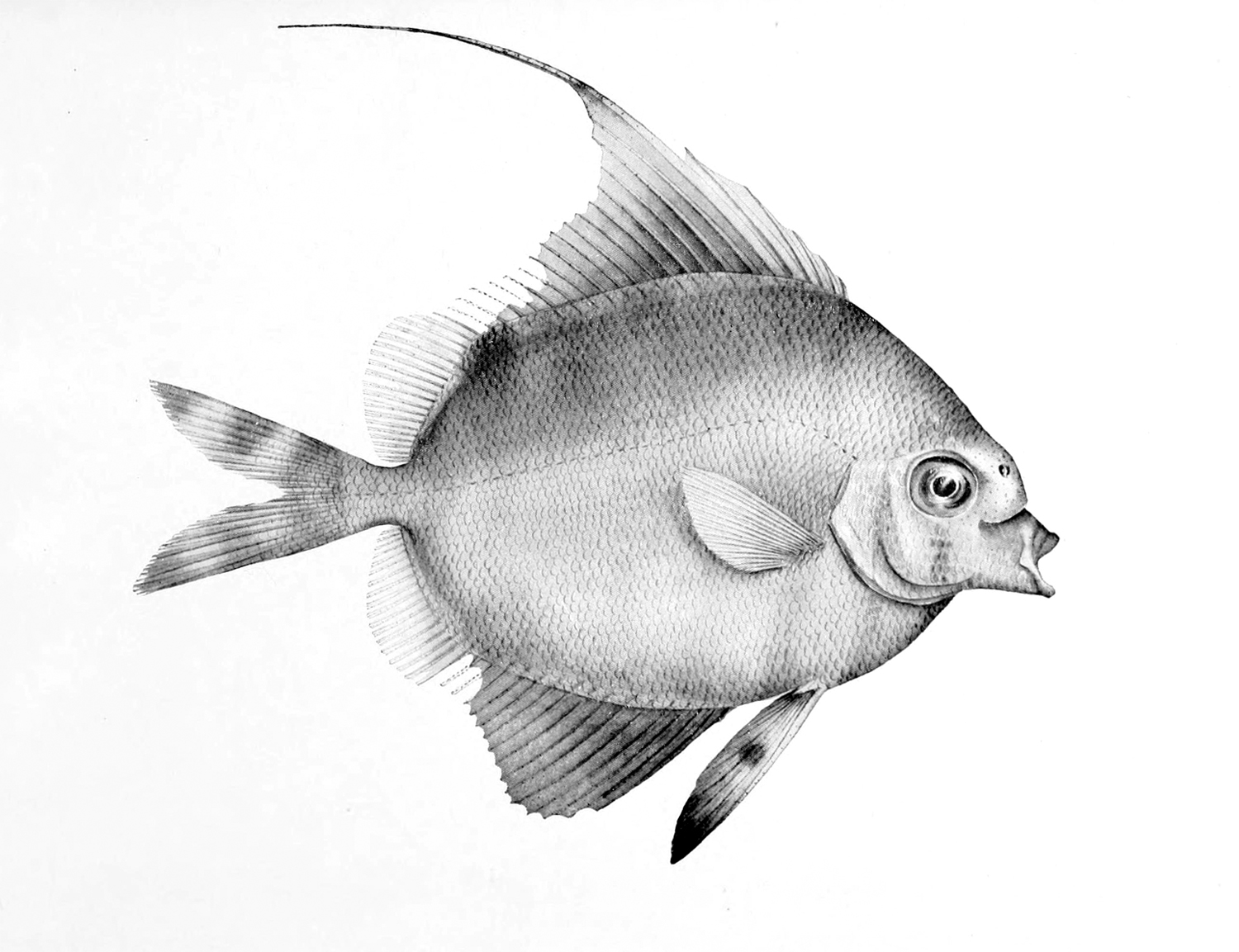
1913 illustration
