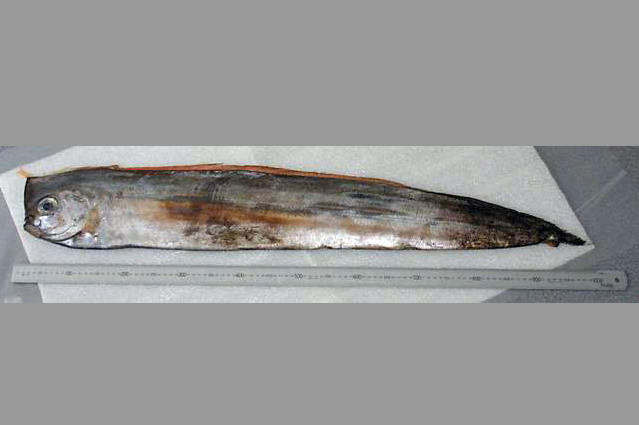

Conservation status
- Least Concern (IUCN 3.1)

Scientific classification
- Domain: Eukaryota
- Kingdom: Animalia
- Phylum: Chordata
- Class: Actinopterygii
- Order: Lampriformes
- Family: Lophotidae
- Genus: Lophotus
- Species: L. guentheri

Binomial name
- Lophotus guentheri Johnston, 1883

= Crested bandfish =

Species of fish

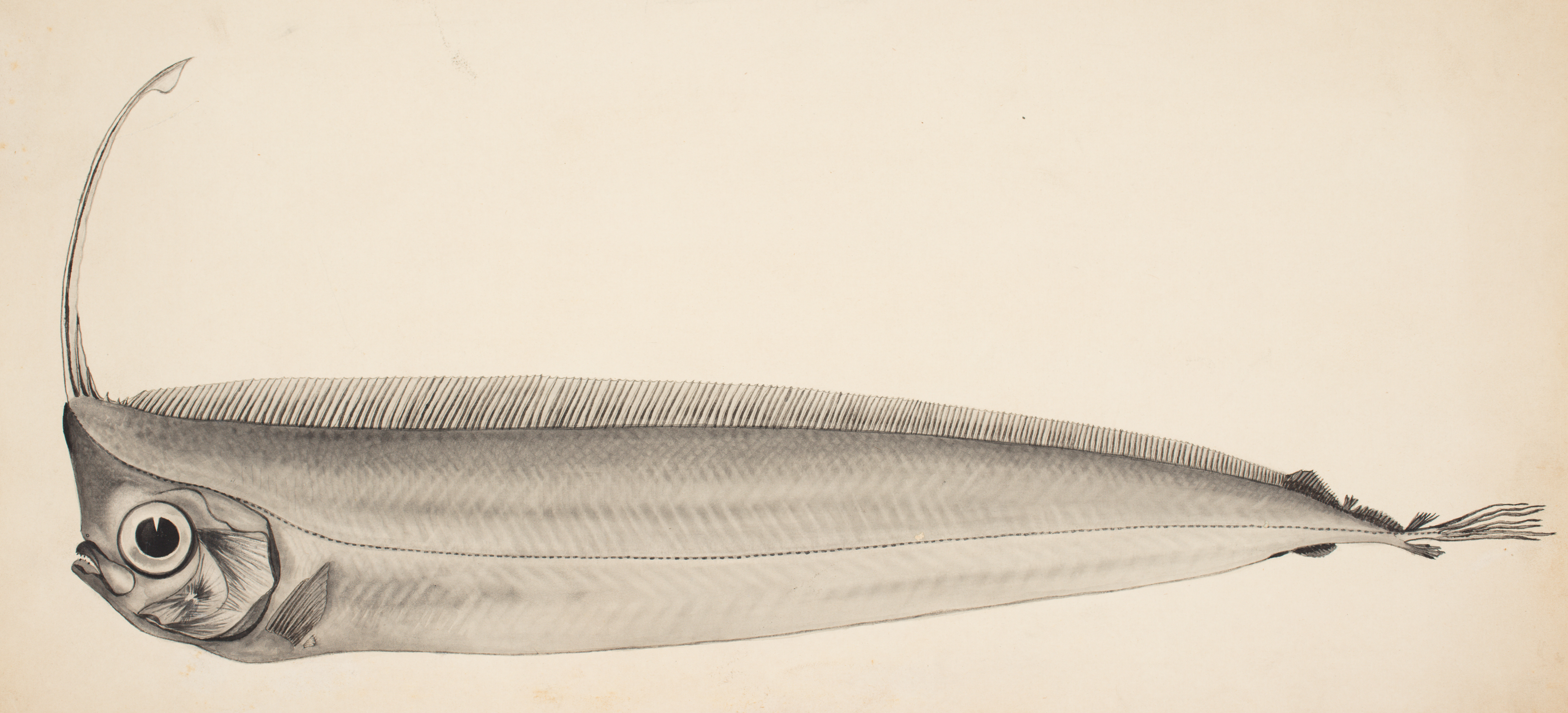
1933 illustration by Louis Thomas Griffin

The crested bandfish (Lophotus guentheri) is a species of crestfish in the family Lophotidae. It has a long string-like body, with large eyes, a red dorsal fin, elongated leading rays, and a short anal fin near the caudal fin. It grows up to 2 metres in length.

== Etymology ==
The species was presumably named for Albert Günther, an ichthyologist at the British Museum (Natural History). In his formal description, Johnston named the species guntheri, although the correct spelling for species named after Günther is guentheri. The species' common names include the crested bandfish, crestfish, unicorn fish and unicorn ribbon-fish. (Note: Species citation: Lophotus guntheri Johnston (1883), Papers and Proceedings of the Royal Society of Tasmania 1882: 177. Type locality: near Emu Bay, northwestern coast of Tasmania.)

== Distribution and ecology ==
The crested bandfish is a marine pelagic species, found at depths up 90 metres, although it may occur at depths up to 300 metres. The species has been found in four locations in the western Pacific: in Australia, near Emu Bay, Tasmania and off the New South Wales coast; Johnston Atoll; and southwestern Taiwan. However, its true distribution is likely wider than this. The species' diet comprises cephalopods and small fish. It has an ink sac, which may be used as a defence mechanism when it encounters danger.

== Conservation ==
Very little is known about the crested bandfish, although specimens have been reported to wash ashore following storms. The crested bandfish has been evaluated as "Least Concern" for the IUCN Red List.
