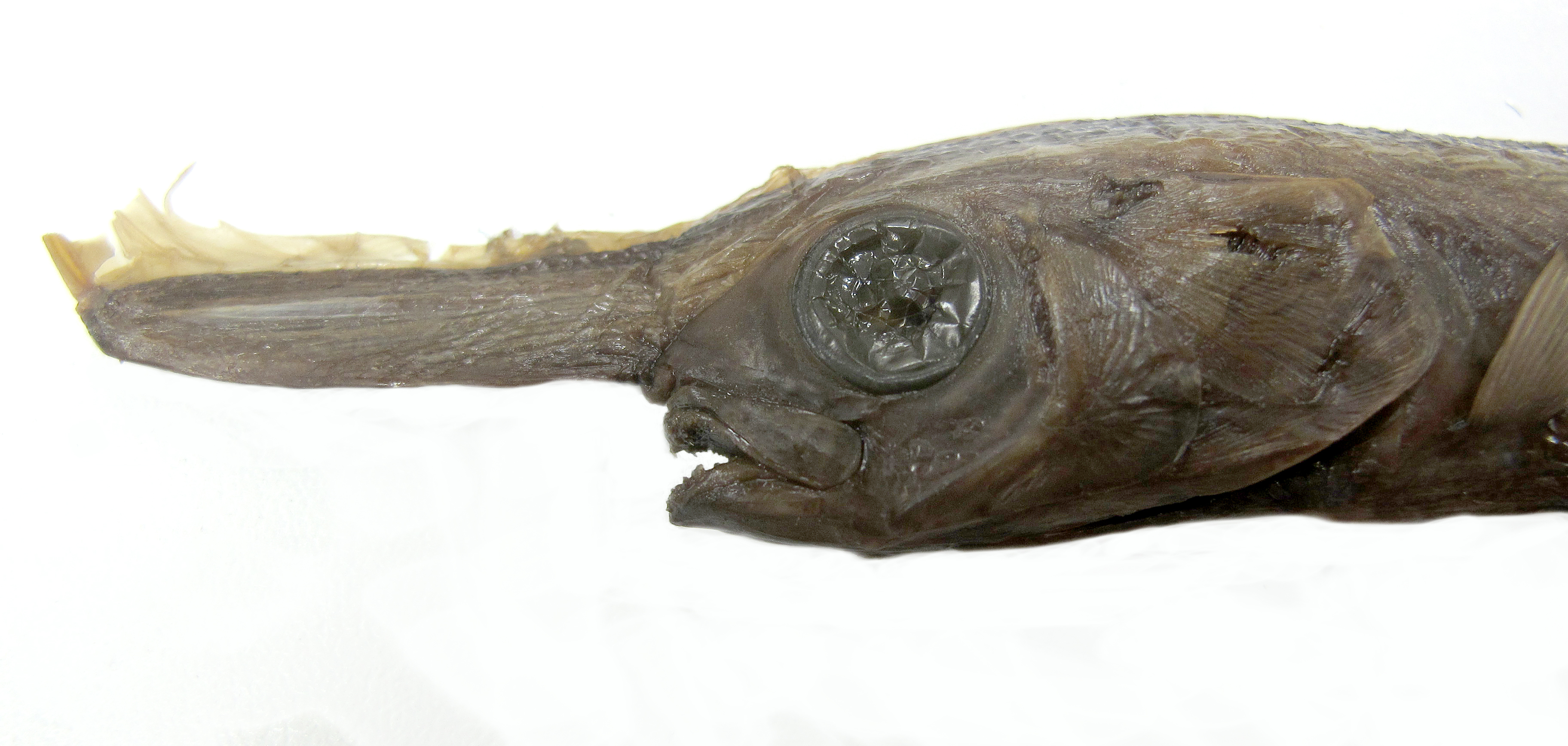

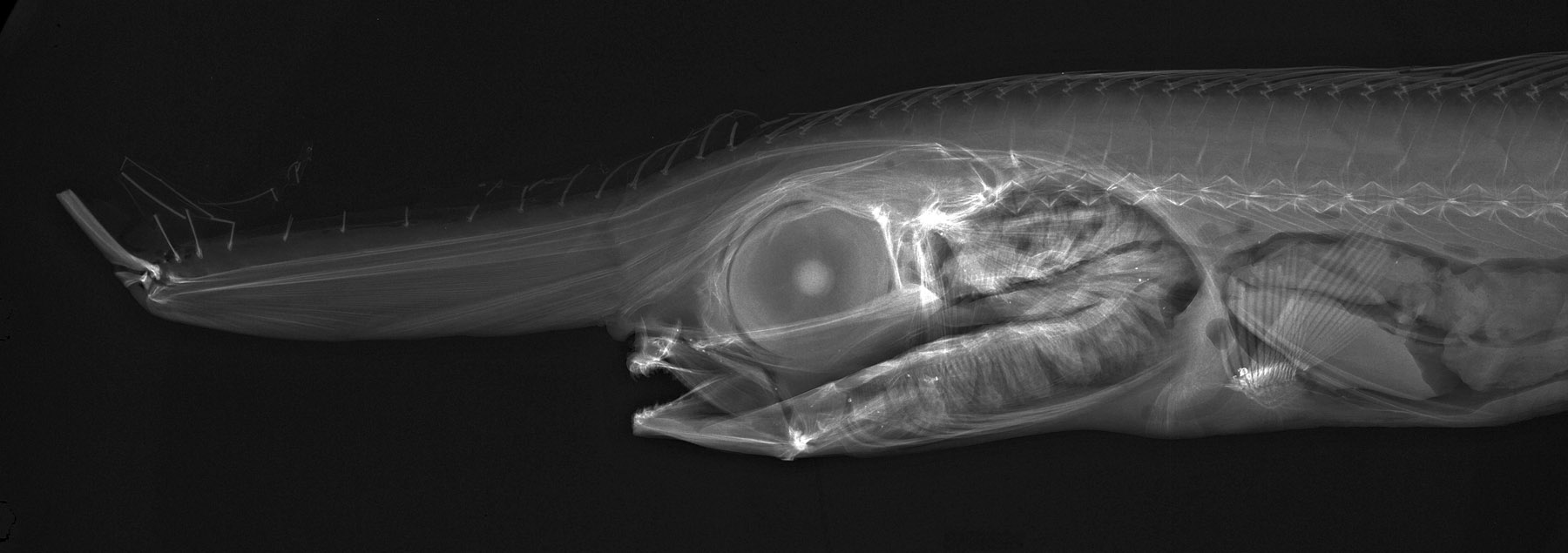
- Eumecichthys fiski, conventional and X-ray images

Conservation status
- Least Concern (IUCN 3.1)

Scientific classification
- Kingdom: Animalia
- Phylum: Chordata
- Class: Actinopterygii
- Order: Lampriformes
- Family: Lophotidae
- Genus: Eumecichthys; Regan, 1907
- Species: E. fiski

Binomial name
- Eumecichthys fiski (Günther, 1890)

Synonyms
- Lophotes fiski Günther, 1890

= Eumecichthys =

Unicorn crestfish

Genus of fishes

Eumecichthys fiski, the unicorn crestfish or unicornfish, is a very rare, little-known species of crestfish in the family Lophotidae, and the only member of the genus Eumecichthys. It likely has a worldwide distribution, having been first discovered offshore of Kalk Bay, South Africa, and subsequently reported from the Sea of Japan, southwest Florida, Clarion Island off Mexico, Hawaii, and India. Reports from the Bering Sea are likely erroneous. It is found in the bathypelagic zone, at depths around 1,000 m (3,300 ft).

== Description ==
This species has a highly elongate, ribbon-like body reaching up to 150 cm (59 in) in length. Its common name derives from a horn-like supraoccipital process projecting forward above the eyes. The upper jaw is protrusible, with small conical teeth adapted for seizing small fishes and pelagic invertebrates. The dorsal fin extends the full length of the body with 310–392 soft rays, the first three to five rays forming an elongated pennant at the cranial ridge. The pectoral fins contain 13–15 rays, while pelvic fins are absent. The anal fin contains 5–9 rays and is split in adults to form two rows of nubbins. The caudal fin has 12–13 rays, the lowermost being enlarged and bony. Coloration is silvery with 24–60 dark subvertical bands; dorsal and caudal fins are crimson.

Juveniles are smaller, with less developed cranial horns, fewer subvertical bands, and shorter dorsal-fin pennants, reflecting ontogenetic development. The flexible dorsal-fin pennants may be raised or lowered, potentially serving as a defensive mechanism. Compared with other lampriforms such as Lophotus lacepede and Zu cristatus, E. fiski is distinct in its horn, crimson fins, and unusually high dorsal-ray count. Its laterally compressed, ribbon-like body is adapted for efficient swimming in the bathypelagic zone. Like other lampriforms, it lacks a swim bladder, relying on lipid-rich tissues for buoyancy.

Eumecichthys is one of three lampriform genera with ink tubes that expel black fluid from the cloaca as a defense. The ink tube, derived from a primitive gut, runs above the intestine. Predators include the longnose lancetfish (Alepisaurus ferox), with specimens found that had ingested unicorn crestfish. An extinct relative, Babelichthys, is known from the Eocene of Iran.

Phylogenetic studies place Eumecichthys at the base of Lampriformes, suggesting early divergence in acanthomorph evolution. Fossil records, including Babelichthys, support long-term morphological conservation of dorsal-fin pennants and cranial horn. Molecular analyses show shared evolutionary history with other lampriforms, reflecting adaptive radiation in pelagic ecosystems.

== Geographical distribution ==
Eumecichthys fiski is recorded worldwide in deep pelagic waters, including South Africa, the Sea of Japan, southwest Florida, Clarion Island, Hawaii, and India. Recent captures in the Canary upwelling zone indicate preference for nutrient-rich midwater habitats where vertical migrations of prey occur. The species is naturally rare, mostly collected as bycatch, indicating low population density despite broad geographic range.

== Ecology and life history ==
Little is known about reproduction; it is presumed to be a pelagic spawner, releasing eggs into open water. Juveniles are paler, with shorter dorsal-fin pennants and smaller cranial horns. Growth rates, lifespan, and age at maturity remain unknown but likely moderate to long, as in other deep-sea pelagic fishes.

E. fiski is carnivorous, feeding on small fishes and pelagic invertebrates. Diel vertical migrations likely move individuals from bathypelagic to mesopelagic zones to feed while avoiding predators. Observed stomach contents show diverse mesopelagic fish, cephalopods, and crustaceans. Juveniles likely follow similar feeding behavior. The ink tube provides a unique defense against predators in low-light pelagic conditions.

== Conservation ==
The IUCN classifies Eumecichthys fiski as Least Concern due to wide but sparse distribution and lack of targeted fisheries. Threats are mainly indirect: climate-driven changes in deep-water temperature and oxygen, shifts in prey availability, and deep-sea trawling. Fossil evidence suggests the lineage has persisted tens of millions of years, indicating resilience. Continued research is needed on ecological roles, population trends, and vulnerability to anthropogenic impacts.

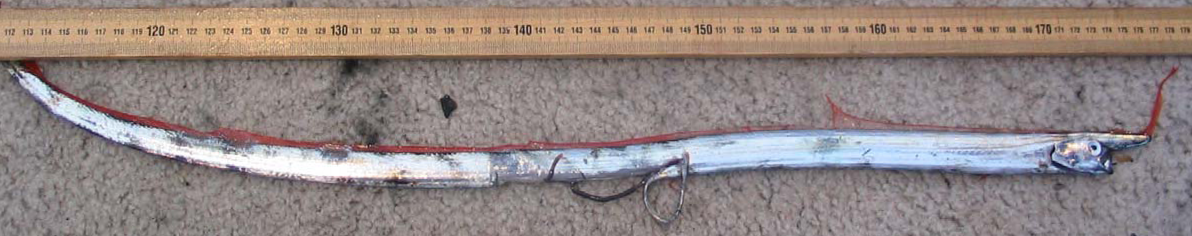
Unicorn crestfish
