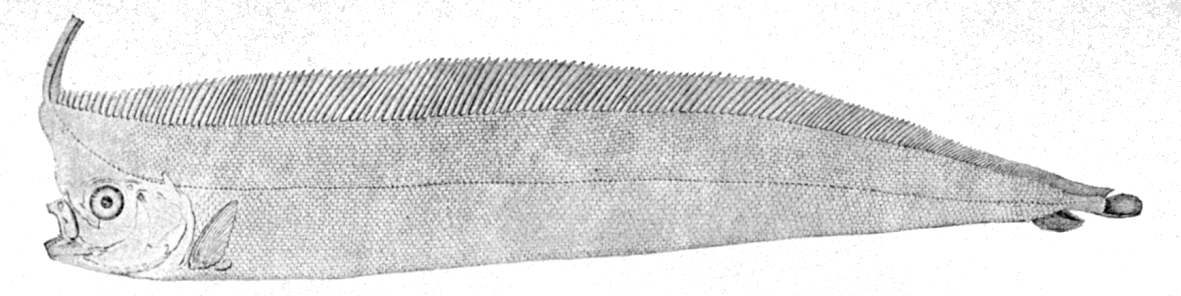

Conservation status
- Least Concern (IUCN 3.1)

Scientific classification
- Kingdom: Animalia
- Phylum: Chordata
- Class: Actinopterygii
- Division: Teleostei
- Order: Lampriformes
- Family: Lophotidae
- Genus: Lophotus
- Species: L. lacepede

Binomial name
- Lophotus lacepede Giorna, 1809

Synonyms
- Leptopus peregrinus Rafinesque, 1814; Lophotes cristatus Johnson, 1863; Lophotus cepedianus Cloquet, 1823; Lophotus cristatus Johnson, 1863; Lophotus lacepedei Giorna, 1809

= Crested oarfish =

Species of fish

The crested oarfish (Lophotus lacepede) is a species of crestfish in the family Lophotidae. It is a marine fish ranging from waters up to 92 meters deep, but may get stranded in shallow waters.

== Distribution and habitat ==
The crested oarfish lives in warm seas near areas such as the Western Atlantic, Western Indian Ocean, Eastern Atlantic, and the Eastern Pacific within the oceanic and mesopelagic zone.

== Description and ecology ==
The crested oarfish has maximum length of 200 centimeters, but are often are only found at 100 centimeters in length. It has an ink sack near the cloaca, and discharges ink out of it when it feels alarmed. Its prey consists of squids and fishes such as anchovies. It is oviparous, and lays planktonic eggs.

== Conservation ==
The crested oarfish are likely found in marine protected areas, and has no known major threats towards it. No specific conservation measures have been made, and IUCN Red List has classified the fish as a 'least concern' species.

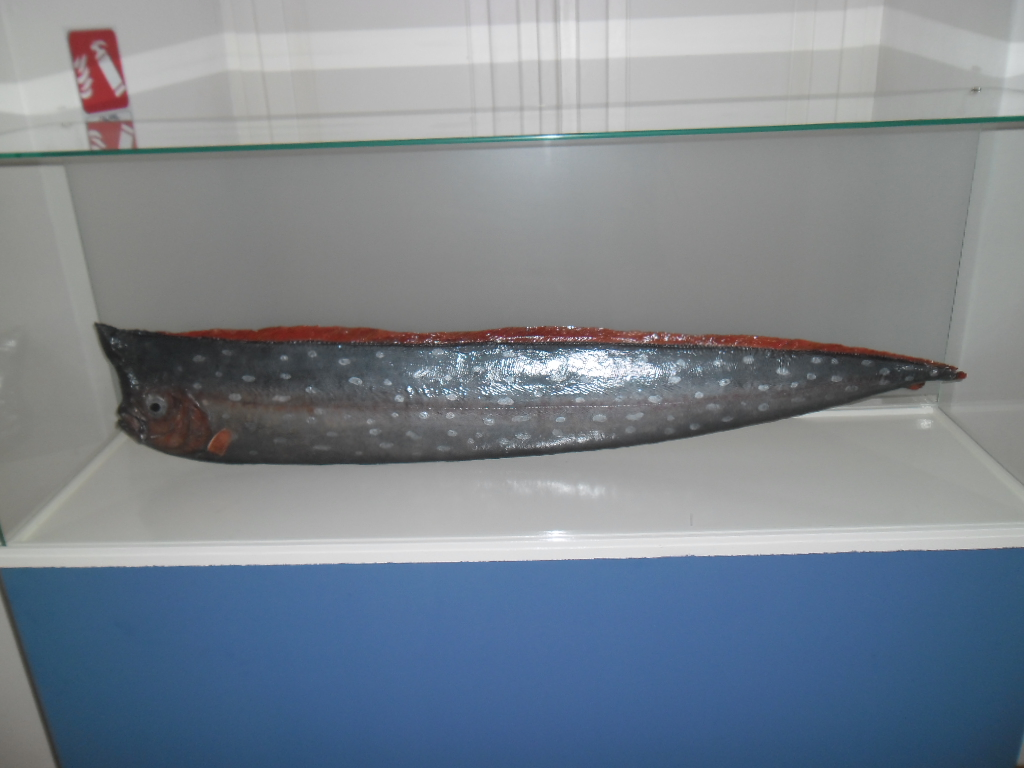
A crested oarfish at the Dubrovnik Natural History Museum
