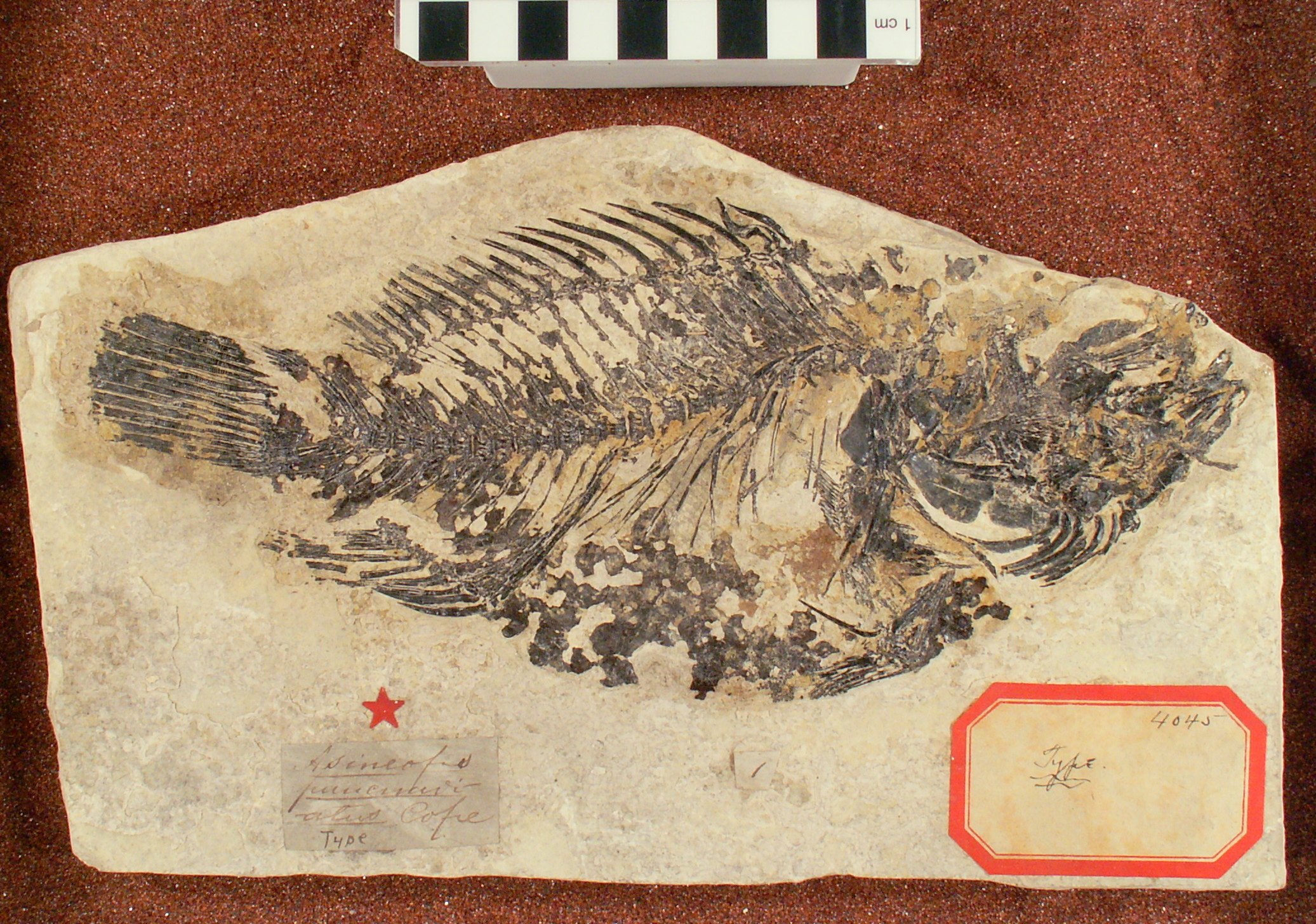
- Asineops squamifrons

Scientific classification
- Kingdom: Animalia
- Phylum: Chordata
- Class: Actinopterygii
- Clade: Acanthomorpha
- Family: †Asineopidae; Cope, 1877
- Genus: †Asineops; Cope, 1870
- Species: †A. squamifrons

Binomial name
- †Asineops squamifrons Cope, 1870

Synonyms
- Asineops pauciradiatus Cope, 1877

= Asineops =

Asineops Temporal range: Early Eocene, 53.5–48.5 Ma

Extinct genus of fishes

Asineops is an enigmatic genus of extinct freshwater ray-finned fish from the Eocene. It is the only member of the family Asineopidae and contains a single species, A. squamifrons, from the famous Green River Formation of Colorado, Wyoming, and Utah. It was described by Edward Drinker Cope in 1870. The name comes from the Greek for "donkey-faced".

Asineops is known from all three prehistoric lakes that would eventually become the Green River Formation, although it is only common in the former Lake Gosiute's deposits. It is extremely rare in the famous Fossil Lake deposits.

Some sources, including Cope, considered it allied with the pirate perch and classified Asineops with it in the family Aphredoderidae. However, more recent analysis indicates that it lacks many of the traits of that family. Other sources still consider it a percopsisform and related to the sympatric percopsiform Erismatopterus. However, an affinity to the Polymixiiformes or Perciformes has also been suggested. Little further research has been done of its affinity, and it is thus considered to be an indeterminate acanthomorph. Asineops may potentially be instead related to Nardoichthys from the Late Cretaceous of Italy.
