= Bathysoma =

Bathysoma Temporal range: Early-Mid Paleocene, 63–59 Ma
- Life restoration

Scientific classification
- Kingdom: Animalia
- Phylum: Chordata
- Class: Actinopterygii
- Division: Teleostei
- Order: Lampriformes
- Genus: †Bathysoma; Davis, 1890
- Species: †B. lutkeni

Binomial name
- †Bathysoma lutkeni Davis, 1890

Extinct genus of fishes

Bathysoma is an extinct genus of marine lampriform ray-finned fish from the early-mid Paleocene. It contains a single species, B. lutkeni from Sweden. Its fossils are common in exposures of the Danian København Limestone Formation at Limhamns kalkbrott, one of the largest quarries in northern Europe. A single specimen is also known from an erratic boulder from the Selandian Lellinge Greensand Formation of southern Sweden.

It is the second oldest lampriform known, after Nardovelifer of Campanian/Maastrichtian Italy. B. lutkeni has a disk-shaped body and an elongated head. It was originally described as a menid bony fish. Later, it was described as being a basal snake mackerel. Eventually, anatomical similarities with the turkmenids were noted, and B. lutkeni is now regarded as an extremely basal lamprid.
