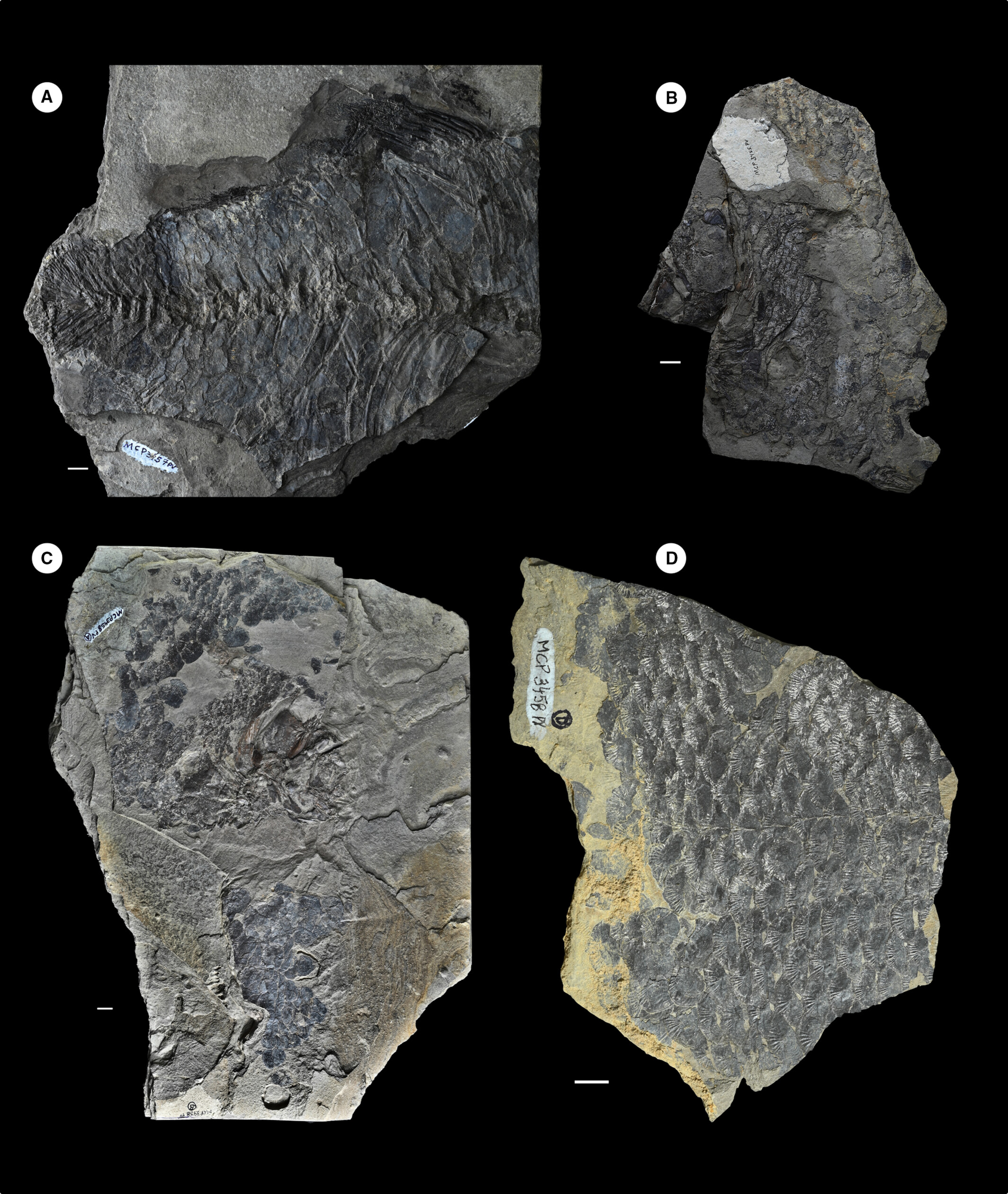
- All known specimens of Gondwanacanthus decollatus

Scientific classification
- Kingdom: Animalia
- Phylum: Chordata
- Class: Actinopterygii
- Division: Teleostei
- Clade: Acanthomorpha
- Genus: †Gondwanacanthus; Ribeiro et al., 2026

Type species
- Gondwanacanthus decollatus Ribeiro et al., 2026

= Gondwanacanthus =

Gondwanacanthus Temporal range: Early Cretaceous late Barremian or early Aptian 123.6–117.3 Ma

Extinct genus of fishes

Gondwanacanthus is an extinct genus of acanthomorph ray-finned fish from the Barremian-Aptian boundary of Alagoas, Brazil. Fossils of the fish have been found in a quarry that has strata belonging to the Morro do Chaves Formation. Gondwanacanthus was a medium-sized, deep-bodied fish with large, spinoid scales. These scales, along with a number of other features like the presence of fin spines on the dorsal and anal fins, place it as a very early member of the order. The description of the genus caused a 25 million year range extension of Acanthomorpha, supporting previous estimates in molecular dating analyses. Gondwanacanthus lived within a rift lake system surrounded by mountains with potential marine influences. Smaller fish in the superorder Clupeomorpha were by far the most common from the deposits though larger fish Mawsonia and Lepidotes were also present and most likely represented some of the largest predators of the lake system.

== History and naming ==
The specimens assigned to Gondwanacanthus were first collected from the strata within the InterCement Quarry in São Miguel dos Campos, Alagoas, Brazil in the early 2000s. These layers represent either late Barremian or early Aptian deposits of the Morro do Chaves Formation. After the initial collection of the material, they were placed in the Paleontological Collection at the Museu de Ciências da Pontifícia Universidade Católica do Rio Grande do Sul in Porto Alegre, Brazil. This was until Alexandre Cunha Ribeiro found a well-preserved specimen with 'ctenoid scales', which would become the holotype specimen assigned of the new genus. This specimen, along with two others, were described by Ribeiro and coauthors in 2026. Based on a number of anatomic features, the authors placed the genus within Acanthomorpha, making it the oldest member of the group currently known by about 25 million years.

The generic name of Gondwanacanthus originates from the supercontinent where the fish lived, Gondwana, and the suffix "acanthus" which references the fish's placement within Acanthomorpha. The specific name "decollatus" derives from the Greek word for decapitated, due to lack of a head in the holotype specimen. The authors suspect that they happened during collection rather than taphonomic processes due to the straight cut cutting off that section of the body.

== Description ==
Though the complete skeleton of Gondwanacanthus is unknown, the holotype of the fish (MCP3457) shows that the fish was ovular in shape, having a maximum body depth of 197 millimetres (7.8 in). The complete length of the fish is unknown but the holotype, which preserves a majority of the postcranial vertebrae of Gondwanacanthus, has a length of 240 millimetres (9.4 in). The paratypes of Gondwanacanthus (MCP3455 and MCP3455) both preserve parts of the skull and pectoral fins which are absent in the holotype. Between the three specimens, a total of four individuals are preserved.

Not much of the skull of Gondwanacanthus is known with the only known bones largely belonging to the opercular region of the fish. Both the operculum and preoperculum are much taller than they are wide. The only other bone known from the skull of the fish is the broad hyomandibula. Similar to the skull, the pectoral girdle of Gondwanacanthus is also poorly known with the cleithrum being the only well preserved bone of the girdle. Other bones such as the coracoid and supracleithrum are either very fragmentary or only preserved as impressions. Both the cleithrum and what is believed to be the supracleithrum possess large ornamentations. The pectoral fins of the fish are positioned right behind the head and are made up of at least eight fin rays. Though the pectoral fin is very incomplete, the anterior three rays of the fin are noticeably larger than the other ones that were preserved in the specimens. Unlike the anterior portion of the skeleton, majority of the postcranium is much more well preserved. Almost all vertebrae are known with the exception of the first three precaudal vertebrae, showing that the vertebral column of Gondwanacanthus was made up of up to twenty two vertebrae.

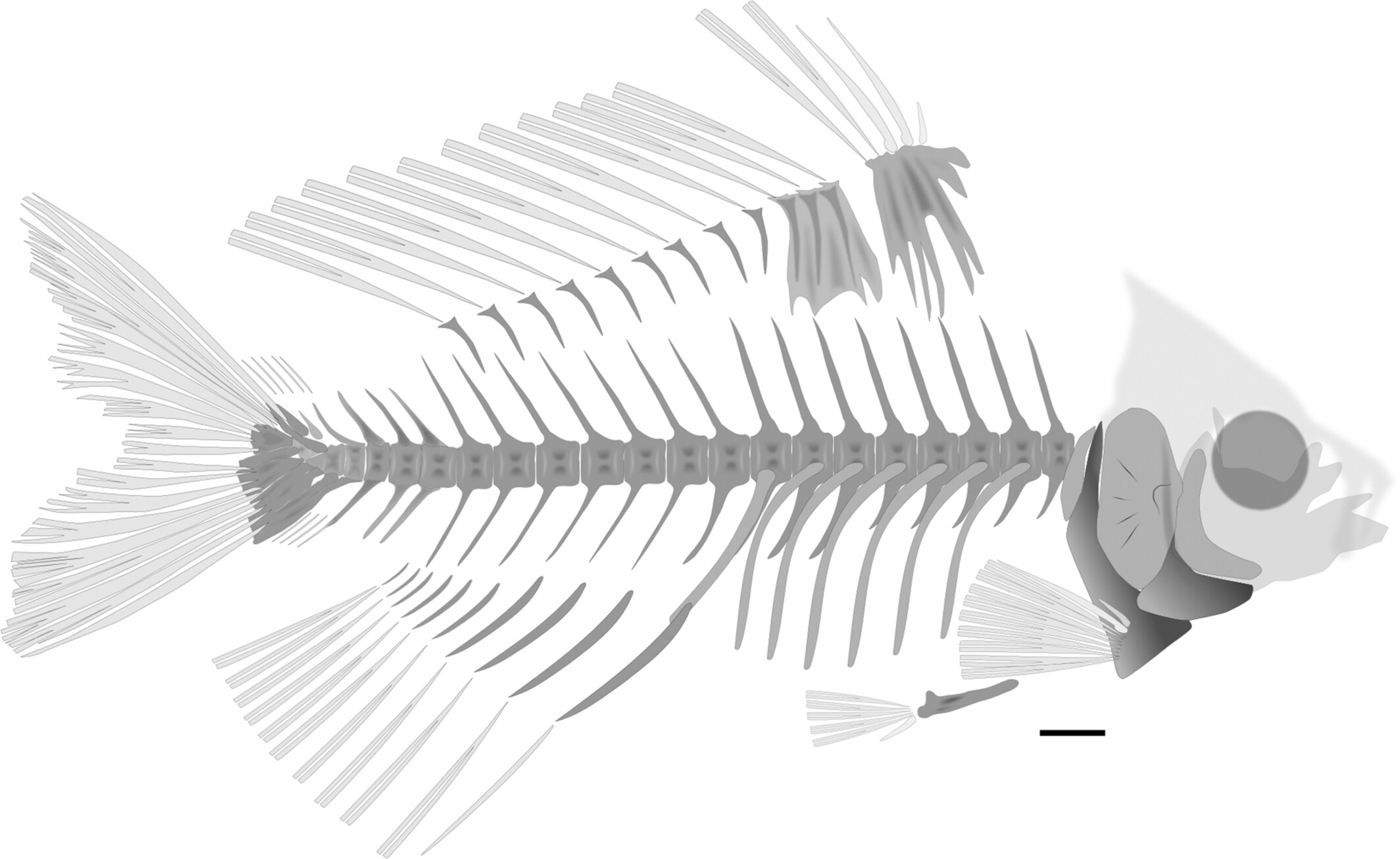
Skeletal restoration of Gondwanacanthus, interpreting it as a more typical acanthomorph

The dorsal fin spans throughout a majority of the body length, with it having a fin base with a length of at least 158 millimetres (6.2 in). Located in front of it is a single short fin spine. Behind the spine is at least ten much larger fin rays that only have segmentation towards the ends. The rest of the dorsal fin is represented by radials preserved as impressions and a ten more fin rays which are much more segmented than those found towards the front of the dorsal fin. It is unknown if this dorsal fin was split into separate parts or not. The pelvic fins of the fish are well preserved, most likely having a similar insertion placement as the dorsal fin. Also similar to the dorsal fin, the pelvic fins possess a fin spine. Behind the fin spine there are five unsegmented fin rays. The anal fin is also parallel to the dorsal fin, being located between the last preserved rib and the fifth precaudal vertebrae. It is made up of at least ten radials that decrease in size after the first four. Only four segmented fin rays are preserved towards the posterior end of the fin, all of which are poorly preserved.

The caudal skeleton of Gondwanacanthus is well preserved and is made up of a parhypural, five hypurals, at least two uroneurals, and a compound terminal centrum. This compound centrum is made up of a fused preural centrum 1 and ural centrum 1 along with a more separate ural centrum 2. Due to a lack of preservation, it is unknown how many epurals would have been present within the caudal skeleton. Though all incomplete, a total of nineteen principal fin rays are preserved. Remains of a few procurrent caudal fin rays are also preserved though much more poorly than the previously mentioned rays.

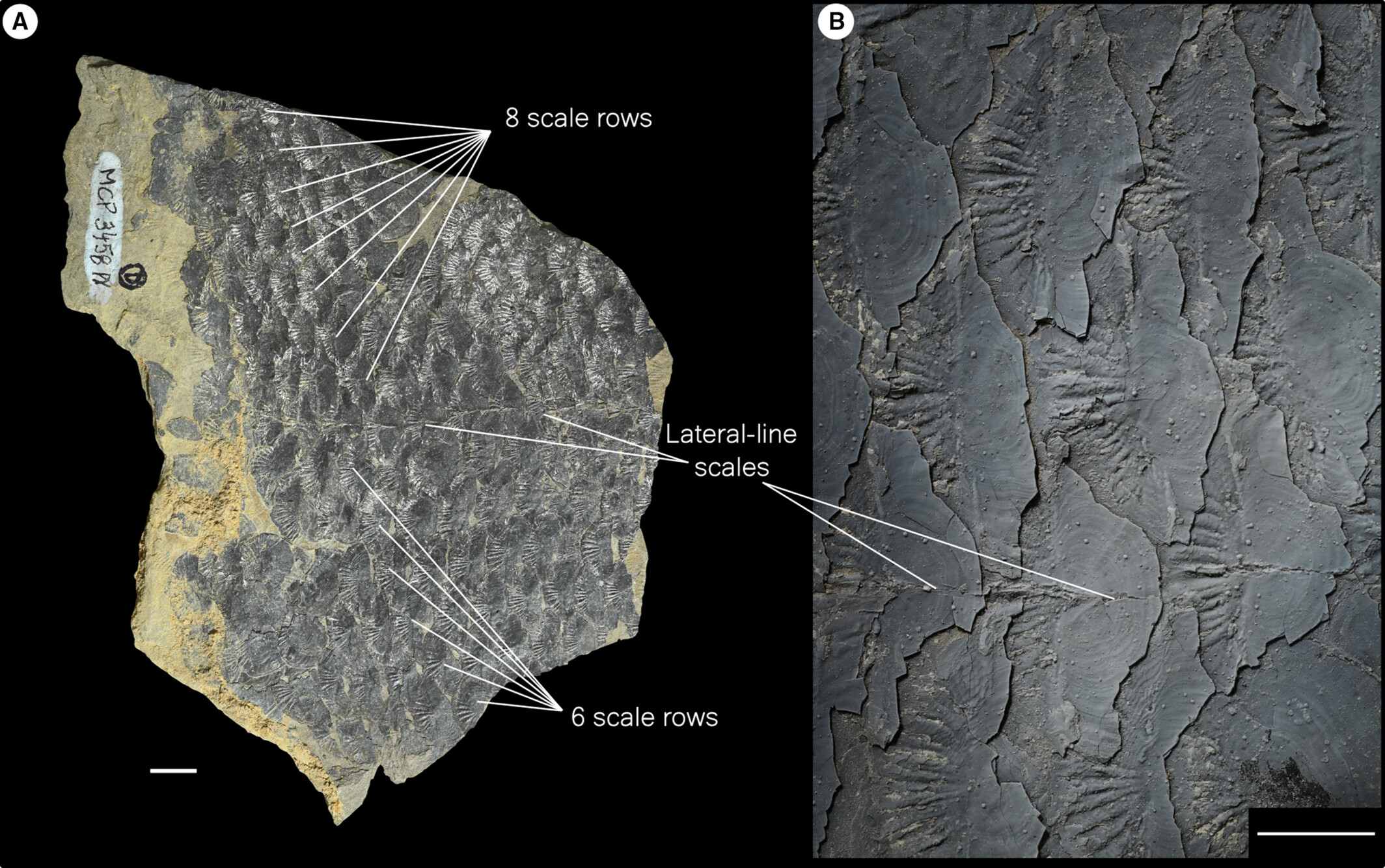
Close up on the scale of Gondwanacanthus

=== Squamation ===
The large scales of Gondwanacanthus are spinoid based on the presence of tooth-like projections on the back edge of the scales that are continuous with the scale. This is similar to what is seen in the more the basal modern acanthomorph Polymixia along with another order, Myctophiformes. Though the complete squamation of the fish is unknown, there were six rows of scales under and at least eight above the lateral line.

== Classification ==
Due to a number of features such as a more anteriorly-placed anal fin along with the presence of dorsal and anal fin spines, the authors of the 2026 description place Gondwanacanthus as a very early member of Acanthomorpha. This placement counters previous interpretations of the evolution of the order with it being believed that the deep-bodied nature of the clade was a more derived feature. The 25 million year range extension of the order caused by the description of Gondwanacanthus is also in line with molecular dating analyses which supported an older origin for Acanthomorpha that previously known.

== Paleoenvironment ==
Gondwanacanthus is known from the Morro do Chaves Formation which represents a lacustrine environment. The lake system represented was a result of a rifting of Gondwana at the time. Over time, this system contracted, causing a decrease in water depth The presence of marine influence on the lake system has also been suggested based on the palynology, showing that the lake was potentially brackish or at least near the ocean. This area was humid and semi-arid with pollen pointing towards that surrounding flora not being very diverse due to this. A large amount of the pollen known belongs to smaller plants such as the gymnosperm families Welwitschiaceae and Cheirolepidiaceae along with ferns in Schizaeaceae. Larger plants such as tree ferns in the family Cyatheaceae are were also present. These larger plants wouldn't have been near the lake however, instead being on the mountains that surrounded and isolated the lakes. Gondwanacanthus was not the only fish within these lakes with clupeiforms such as Pseudollimma and Falconichthys being some of the most common fish. Larger fish such as Mawsonia and Lepidotes were most likely some of the larger predators within these lakes. Tetrapods are present, though much less common than fish, with the side-necked turtle Atolchelys along with a second unnamed member of the family being present within the lakes.
