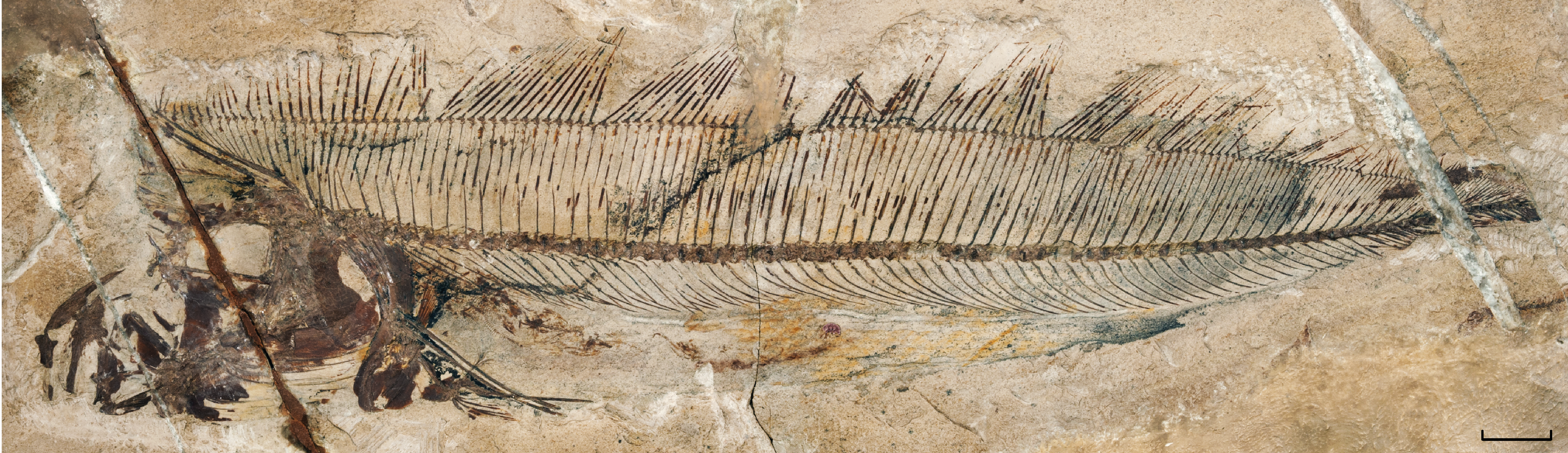
- P. elami holotype, scale bar = 20 mm

Scientific classification
- Domain: Eukaryota
- Kingdom: Animalia
- Phylum: Chordata
- Class: Actinopterygii
- Order: Lampriformes
- Family: Lophotidae
- Genus: †Protolophotus; Walters, 1957

= Protolophotus =

Extinct genus of crestfishes

Protolophotus is an extinct genus of crestfishes, belong to the family Lophotidae.
