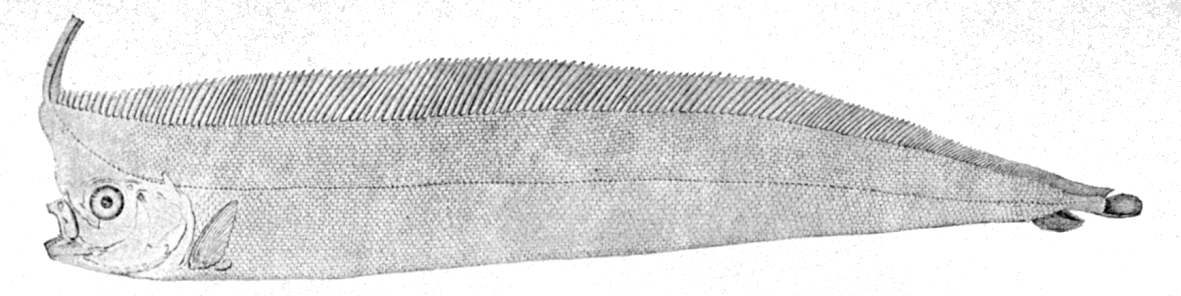
- Crested oarfish (L. lacepede)

Scientific classification
- Kingdom: Animalia
- Phylum: Chordata
- Class: Actinopterygii
- Order: Lampriformes
- Family: Lophotidae
- Genus: Lophotus; Giorna, 1809

= Lophotus =

Genus of fishes

Lophotus is a genus of crestfishes with these currently recognized species:

Species	Common name	Image
Lophotus capellei Temminck & Schlegel, 1845	North Pacific crestfish or unicornfish	
Lophotus guntheri R. M. Johnston, 1883	crested bandfish	
Lophotus lacepede Giorna, 1809	crested oarfish	
