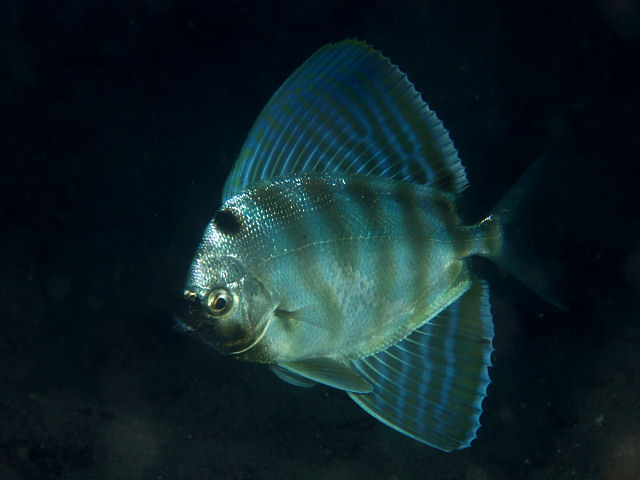
- Velifer hypselopterus
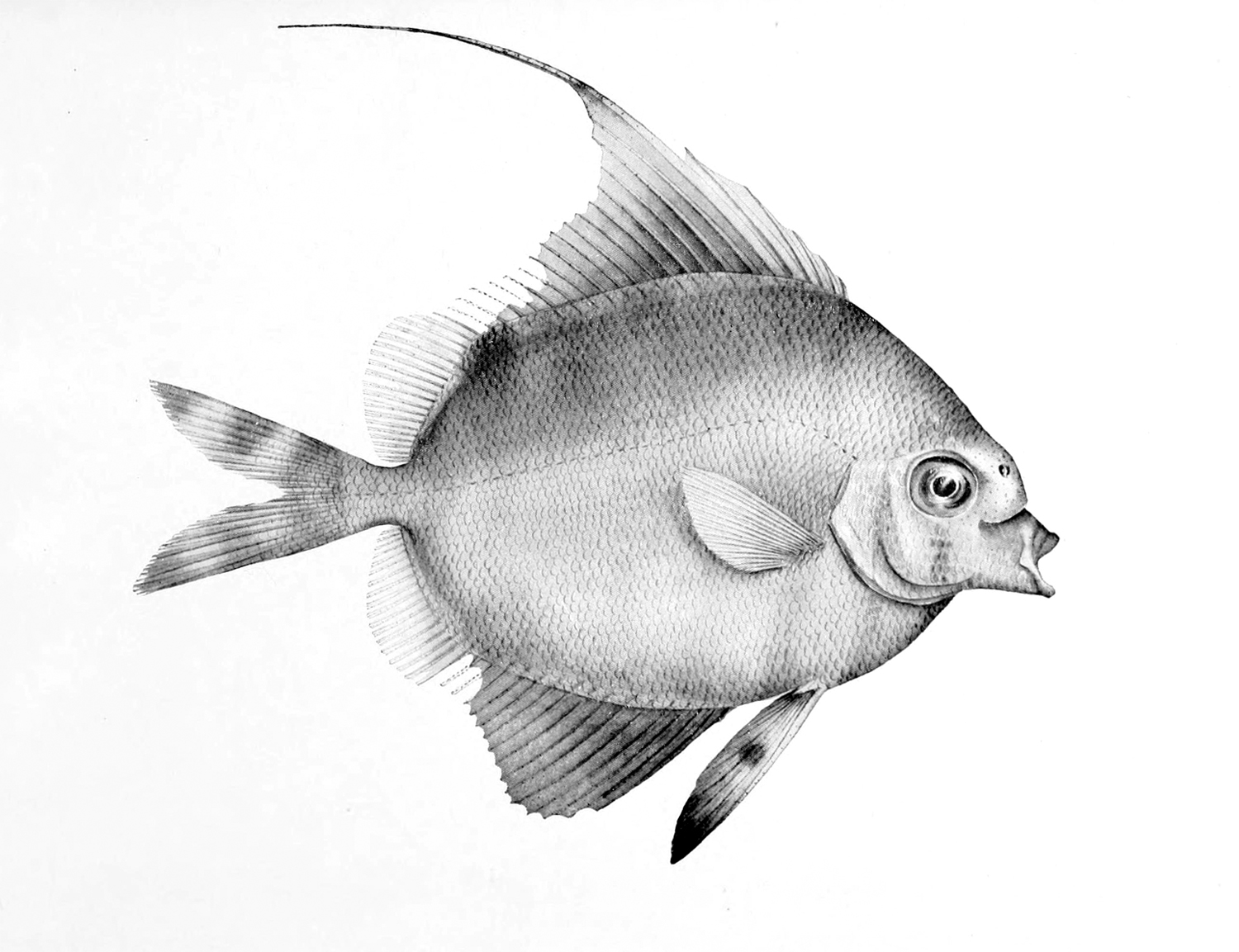
- Metavelifer multiradiatus

Scientific classification
- Kingdom: Animalia
- Phylum: Chordata
- Class: Actinopterygii
- Order: Lampriformes
- Family: Veliferidae; Bleeker, 1859

Genera
- Metavelifer; Velifer

= Veliferidae =

Veliferidae Temporal range: Danian–present Possible Campanian record

Family of fishes

Sailfin moonfishes are a small family, Veliferidae, of lampriform fishes found in the Indian and western Pacific Oceans. Unlike other lampriforms, they live in shallow, coastal waters, of less than 100 m (330 ft) depth, rather than in the deep ocean. They are also much smaller than most of their relatives, up to 30 cm (12 in) in length, and have deep, rather than elongated, bodies. They are characterised by their ability to retract the anterior rays of their dorsal and anal fins into a sheath.

== Species ==
The two extant species in two genera are:

- Genus Metavelifer Walters, 1960
  - Metavelifer multiradiatus (Regan, 1907)
- Genus Velifer Temminck and Schlegel, 1850
  - Velifer hypselopterus Bleeker, 1879

=== Fossil record ===
- †Nardovelifer, from the Campanian of Italy; its placement in the family is contested, alternatively it might be a member of the stem group of Lampriformes.
- †Oechsleria unterfeldensis, from the lower Oligocene of the Bodenheim Formation, Germany.
- †Veronavelifer, from the Eocene of Italy (Monte Bolca)
- †Wettonius angeloi, from the Eocene of Italy (Monte Bolca) and likely Virginia, US (Nanjemoy Formation)
- an unnamed taxon from the Paleocene (Danian) strata from the Dakhla Formation, Egypt
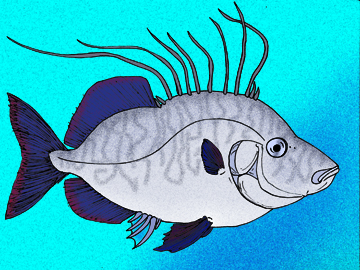
  †Nardovelifer altipinnis
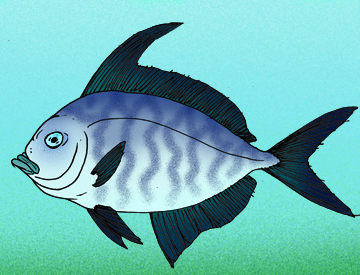
  †Veronavelifer sorbini
