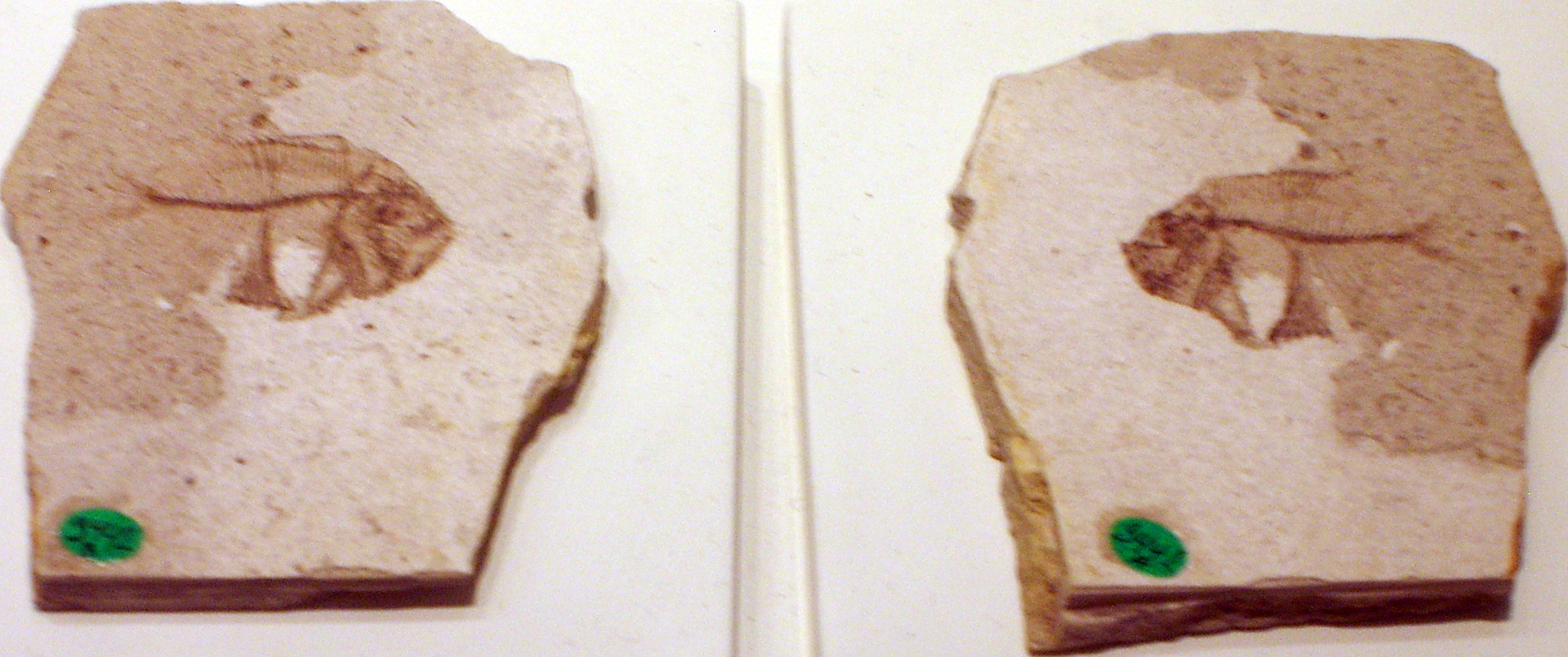
- Palaeocentrotus böggildi fossil at the Geological Museum, Copenhagen

Scientific classification
- Domain: Eukaryota
- Kingdom: Animalia
- Phylum: Chordata
- Class: Actinopterygii
- Order: Lampriformes
- Genus: Palaeocentrotus; Kühne 1941

= Palaeocentrotus =

Extinct genus of fishes

Palaeocentrotus is an extinct genus of Lampridiformes.
