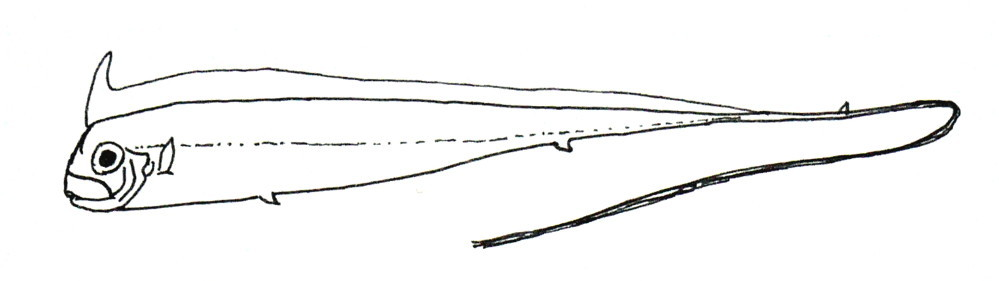

Conservation status
- Least Concern (IUCN 3.1)

Scientific classification
- Kingdom: Animalia
- Phylum: Chordata
- Class: Actinopterygii
- Order: Lampriformes
- Family: Radiicephalidae; Osório, 1917
- Genus: Radiicephalus; Osório, 1917
- Species: R. elongatus

Binomial name
- Radiicephalus elongatus Osório, 1917

= Radiicephalus =

Species of fish

Radiicephalus is a genus of fishes in the monotypic family Radiicephalidae. It was formerly thought to be a monotypic genus, comprising the single species Radiicephalus elongatus, commonly known as tapertail, until the 2018 description of Radiicephalus kessinger. It is a marine fish found in the central and eastern Atlantic and eastern Pacific Ocean. This species grows to 76 cm (30 in) in total length.

== Species ==
There are currently two valid described species:

- Radiicephalus elongatus Osório, 1917
- Radiicephalus kessinger Koeda & Ho, 2018
