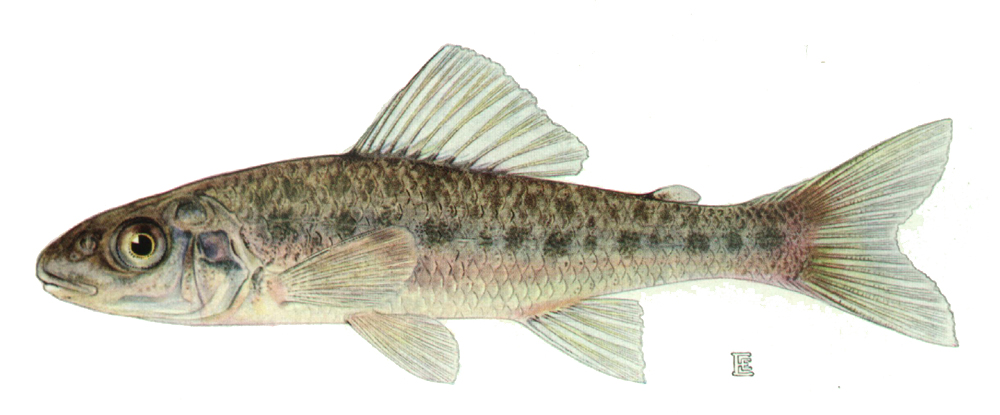
- Trout-perch (P. omiscomaycus)

Scientific classification
- Kingdom: Animalia
- Phylum: Chordata
- Class: Actinopterygii
- Division: Teleostei
- Clade: Ctenosquamata
- Clade: Acanthomorpha; Rosen, 1973

Subdivisions
- Genus †Gondwanacanthus; Family †Asineopidae; Order †Ctenothrissiformes; Superorder Lamprimorpha; Superorder Paracanthopterygii; Superorder Polymixiipterygii; Superorder Acanthopterygii

= Acanthomorpha =

Acanthomorpha Temporal range: Late Barremian/Early Aptian to present

Clade of fishes

Acanthomorpha (meaning "thorn-shaped") is an extraordinarily diverse taxon of teleost fishes with spiny fin rays. The clade contains about one-third of the world's modern species of vertebrates: over 14,000 species.

A key anatomical innovation in acanthomorphs is hollow and unsegmented spines at the anterior edge of the dorsal and anal fins. A fish can extend these sharp bony spines to protect itself from predators, but can also retract them to decrease drag when swimming. Another shared feature is a particular rostral cartilage, associated with ligaments attached to the rostrum and premaxilla, that enables the fish to protrude its jaws considerably to catch food.

Rosen coined the name in 1973 to describe a clade comprising Acanthopterygii, Paracanthopterygii, and also ctenothrissiform fossils from the Cretaceous Period, such as Aulolepis and Ctenothrissa. Those fossils share several details of the skeleton, and especially of the skull, with modern acanthomorphs. Originally based on anatomy, Acanthomorpha has been borne out by more recent molecular analyses.

== Fossil record and evolutionary history ==
The oldest acanthomorphs were initially reported by Louis Agassiz from the Cenomanian Sannine Formation of Lebanon, and were considered as such for over a century until slightly older remains were identified from the end-Albian of Mexico; subsequently an even older member of the group, Gondwanacanthus decollatus, was reported from the upper Barremian or lower Aptian strata of the Morro do Chaves Formation (Brazil). Early acanthomorph fossils are diverse and well-preserved in formations from the early part of the Late Cretaceous from the Cenomanian to the Campanian, but become exceedingly rare throughout the Maastrichtian and the Paleocene (spanning the likely origins of a number of modern taxa) before a second explosion in fossil abundance and diversity in the Eocene. This mysterious gap is known as "Patterson's Gap" after paleontologist Colin Patterson, who first identified it in 1993.

Some otoliths, calcium carbonate structures that form the ears of fishes, have been found from the Jurassic Period that may belong to acanthomorphs, but the oldest body fossils from this taxon are only known from the early-mid Cretaceous Period, about 120 million years ago. Acanthomorphs from the early Late Cretaceous were small, typically about 4 centimeters long, and fairly rare. Toward the beginning of the Cenozoic era, they exploded in an adaptive radiation, so by the time their fossils begin appear more frequently in Eocene-aged strata, they had reached their modern diversity of 300 families.

Recently discovered fish scales from Poland were previously used as evidence that the oldest acanthomorphs occurred in the Late Triassic. However, re-analyses of these scales suggests that they are not true ctenoid scales, and instead resemble those of certain extinct non-teleostean fishes such as the Macrosemiidae.

== Phylogeny ==
The phylogeny of living bony fishes

- Acanthomorpha
  - - Lampripterygii
      Lampridiformes (oarfish, opah, ribbonfish)
    - Paracanthopterygii
      - Percopsaria
        Percopsiformes (troutperches)
      - Zeiogadaria
        - Zeiariae
          Zeiformes (dories)
        - Gadariae
          - Stylephoriformes (tube-eyes, thread-fins)
          - Gadiformes (cods)
  - - Polymixiipterygii
      Polymixiiformes (beardfish)
    - Acanthopterygii
      - Berycimorphaceae
        - Beryciformes (alfonsinos; whalefishes)
        - Trachichthyiformes (pinecone fishes; slimeheads)
      - - Holocentrimorphaceae
          Holocentriformes (squirrelfish; soldier fishes)
        - Percomorpha
