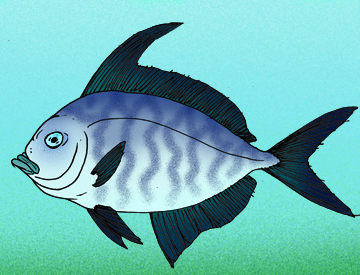

Scientific classification
- Kingdom: Animalia
- Phylum: Chordata
- Class: Actinopterygii
- Order: Lampriformes
- Family: Veliferidae
- Genus: †Veronavelifer; Bannikov, 1990
- Species: †V. sorbinii

Binomial name
- †Veronavelifer sorbinii Bannikov, 1990

= Veronavelifer =

Veronavelifer Temporal range: Lutetian

Extinct genus of fishes

Veronavelifer sorbinii is an extinct sailfin moonfish from the Lutetian epoch of the Monte Bolca lagerstatten.
