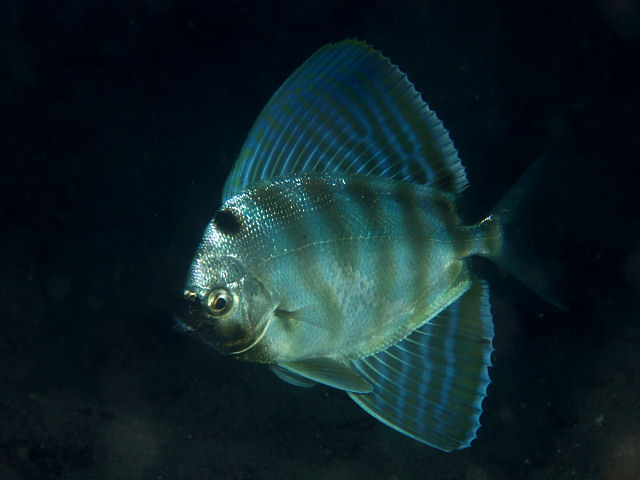

Conservation status
- Least Concern (IUCN 3.1)

Scientific classification
- Kingdom: Animalia
- Phylum: Chordata
- Class: Actinopterygii
- Order: Lampriformes
- Family: Veliferidae
- Genus: Velifer; Temminck & Schlegel, 1850
- Species: V. hypselopterus

Binomial name
- Velifer hypselopterus Bleeker, 1879

= Velifer =

Species of fish

Velifer is an Indo-Pacific genus of ray-finned fishes in the family Veliferidae. It is monotypic, being represented by the single species Velifer hypselopterus, the sailfin velifer. This species grows to a length of 40 centimetres (16 in) total length and is of minor importance in commercial fisheries.
