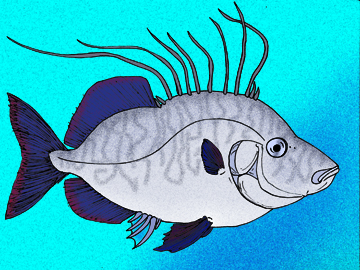

Scientific classification
- Domain: Eukaryota
- Kingdom: Animalia
- Phylum: Chordata
- Class: Actinopterygii
- Order: Lampriformes
- Family: Veliferidae
- Genus: †Nardovelifer; C. Sorbini & L. Sorbini, 1999
- Species: †N. altipinnis

Binomial name
- †Nardovelifer altipinnis C. Sorbini & L. Sorbini, 1999

= Nardovelifer =

Nardovelifer Temporal range: Campanian,83–70 Ma

Extinct genus of fishes

Nardovelifer altipinnis is the oldest known lamprid fish. It dates from the Campanian age of Nardò, Italy.
