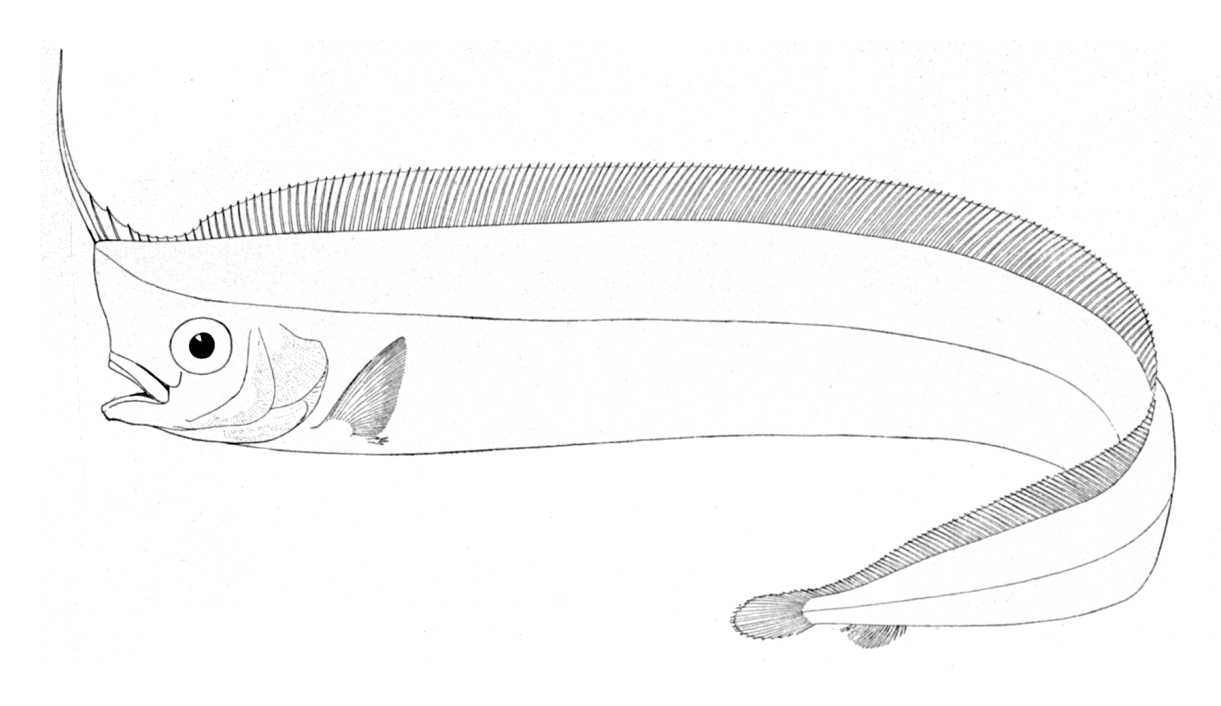
- North Pacific crestfish Lophotus capellei

Scientific classification
- Kingdom: Animalia
- Phylum: Chordata
- Class: Actinopterygii
- Order: Lampriformes
- Family: Lophotidae; Bonaparte, 1845

Genera
- Eumecichthys; Lophotus †Babelichthys †Eolophotes †Protolophotus †Oligolophotes

= Crestfish =

Crestfishes Temporal range: Eocene–present

Family of fishes

Crestfishes, family Lophotidae, are lampriform fishes found in most oceans. It consists of two extant and four extinct genera.

They are elongated, ribbon-like fishes, silver in color, found in deep tropical and subtropical waters worldwide. Their scientific name is from Greek lophos meaning "crest" and refer to the crest (part of the dorsal fin) that emerges from the snout and head; this structure gives them their other name of unicorn fishes.

The extant genera all possess ink sacs that open into their cloacae from which they can produce a cloud of black ink when threatened (as in many cephalopods).

== Genera ==
Extant Genera	Image
Eumecichthys	Unicorn crestfish (E. fiski)
Lophotus	Crested bandfish (L. guntheri)
Fossil Genera	Image
†Babelichthys	†Babelichthys olneyi
†Eolophotes	†Eolophotes lenis
†Protolophotus	†Protolophotus elami
†Oligolophotes	†Oligolophotes fragosus
