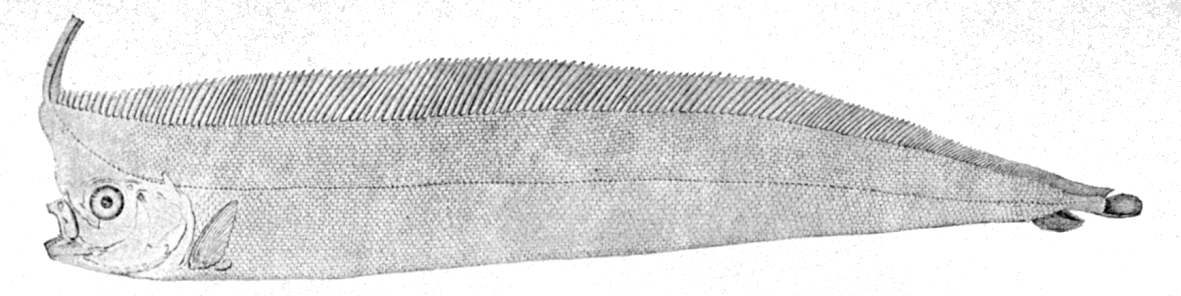
- Crested oarfish, Lophotus lacepede (Lophotidae)

Scientific classification
- Kingdom: Animalia
- Phylum: Chordata
- Class: Actinopterygii
- Division: Teleostei
- Superorder: Lamprimorpha
- Order: Lampriformes; Regan, 1909

Type species
- Lampris guttatus Brünnich, 1788

Diversity
- 7 living families

Synonyms
- Allotriognathi "Bathysomi" (non-monophyletic); Taeniosomi (monophyletic group containing Crestfishes (Lophotidae), Tapertails (Radiicephalidae), Ribbonfishes (Trachipteridae), and Oarfishes (Regalecidae); Lampriformes (alternative ordinal name not currently used in most phylogenetic analyses)

= Lampriformes =

Lampriformes Temporal range: Campanian–Recent

Order of fishes

Lampriformes (Note: In adherence to WikiProject Fishes guidelines, the taxonomic name used is the one that appears in Eschmeyer's Catalog of Fishes.) (/ˈlæmprɪfɔːrmiːz/) is an order of ray-finned fishes. Members are commonly known as lampriforms, and include such open-ocean and partially deep-sea Teleostei as the opahs, sailfin velifer, crestfishes, ribbonfishes and oarfishes. A synonym for this order is Allotriognathi, while an often-seen spelling variant is Lampridiformes. They contain seven extant families which are generally small but highly distinct, and a mere 12 lampriform genera with some 20 species altogether are recognized. They are the only extant members of the superorder Lamprimorpha, which was formerly diverse throughout much of the Late Cretaceous.

The scientific name literally means "shaped (like the) bright (one)", as "lampr-", meaning bright, comes from lampris, the generic name for the opah. In contrast, most other living lampriforms are actually ribbon-like and not very similar to the disc-shaped opahs in habitus. They are, however, quite distinctly united by their anatomy, and the family's phylogeny, as well as the most ancient fossils of this order suggest the original lampriform was rather "opah-shaped". The scientific name is a combination of Lampris (the type genus) + the standard fish order suffix "-formes". It ultimately derives from Ancient Greek lamprós (λαμπρός, "bright") + Latin forma ("external form"), the former in reference to brilliant coloration of opahs.

== Description and ecology ==
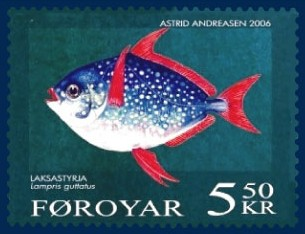
Lampris guttatus on Faroese stamp FO 546 by Astrid Andreasen

These oceanic fishes are pelagic feeders that stay well above the sea floor, and normally occur in waters 100–1000 m deep. They are typically brightly coloured as adults, often with brilliant crimson fins. Lampriforms have highly variable body forms, but they are generally laterally compressed. Some are rounded in lateral view, while others are very elongated. The former are termed bathysomes—"deep-bodies", from Ancient Greek bathýs (βᾶθύς) "deep" + sōma (σῶμα) "body"—and the latter taeniosomes—"ribbon-bodies", Greek tainía (ταινία) "ribbon". They vary greatly in size, too, ranging from less than 30 cm (12 in) in the sailfin moonfishes (Veliferidae) to Regalecus glesne, the longest of all living bony fishes, which may reach 17 m (56 ft) in length.

The lampriforms have 84 to 96 total vertebrae; an orbitosphenoid bone is present in some members of this order. Their premaxilla completely excludes the maxilla from the gape, but the jaws are highly protrusible, nonetheless. The upper jaw's protrusion is achieved in a unique way: the maxilla, instead of being ligamentously attached to the ethmoid and palatine, slides in and out with the highly protractile premaxilla. The pelvic fins have up to 17 rays and are placed rather far toward the front of the animal, but they can be missing entirely. The dorsal fin is long, and tends to extend along most of the length of the body. Fin spines are absent in all. Some have a physoclistous gas bladder, while others have none. They either have tiny scales or naked skin.

== Systematics and evolution ==
The Lampriformes are anatomically similar to some Acanthopterygii at a first glance, but more detailed studies reveal they are not as advanced, and many authors assign them to a basal position inside the advanced spiny-rayed Teleostei clade called Acanthomorpha, as monotypic superorder Lampridiomorpha. Unlike their presumed relatives, they lack fin spines, however, and other authors have considered them to form a lineage just outside the Acanthomorpha, and the sister taxon of the Myctophiformes. Molecular data also support the view that the Lampriformes are close to the advanced Teleostei. But the data do not agree on their exact relationships, and the Myctophiformes are also inferred to be close to the Protacanthopterygii, one of the core groups of moderately advanced teleosts. As modern taxonomy tries to avoid a profusion of small taxa, and the delimitation of the Euteleostei (Protacanthopterygii sensu stricto and their allies) versus Acanthopterygii remains uncertain, the systematics and taxonomy of the Lampriformes among the teleosts are in need of further study.

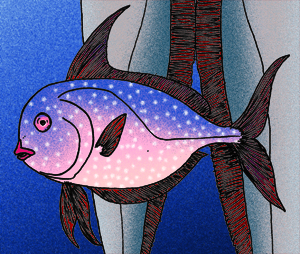
Reconstruction of Analectis pala, the youngest-known member of the extinct bathysome Turkmenidae, which dates from the Late Oligocene

The lampriforms diverged from other teleosts in the Cretaceous, perhaps 80 million years ago (Mya) or slightly more, considering that the oldest-known lampriforms, Nardovelifer, date from the late Campanian epoch and are already clearly assignable to the present order. The basal lampriforms were bathysomes, while the taeniosome body shape is apomorphic and seems to have evolved only once. The order underwent its main radiation in the Paleocene period; the opah-like Turkmenidae were a family of lampriforms thriving at that time, but going extinct around the start of the Neogene, about 23 Mya. Other fossil Lampridiformes are Bajaichthys, Palaeocentrotus, and Veronavelifer.

=== Classification ===
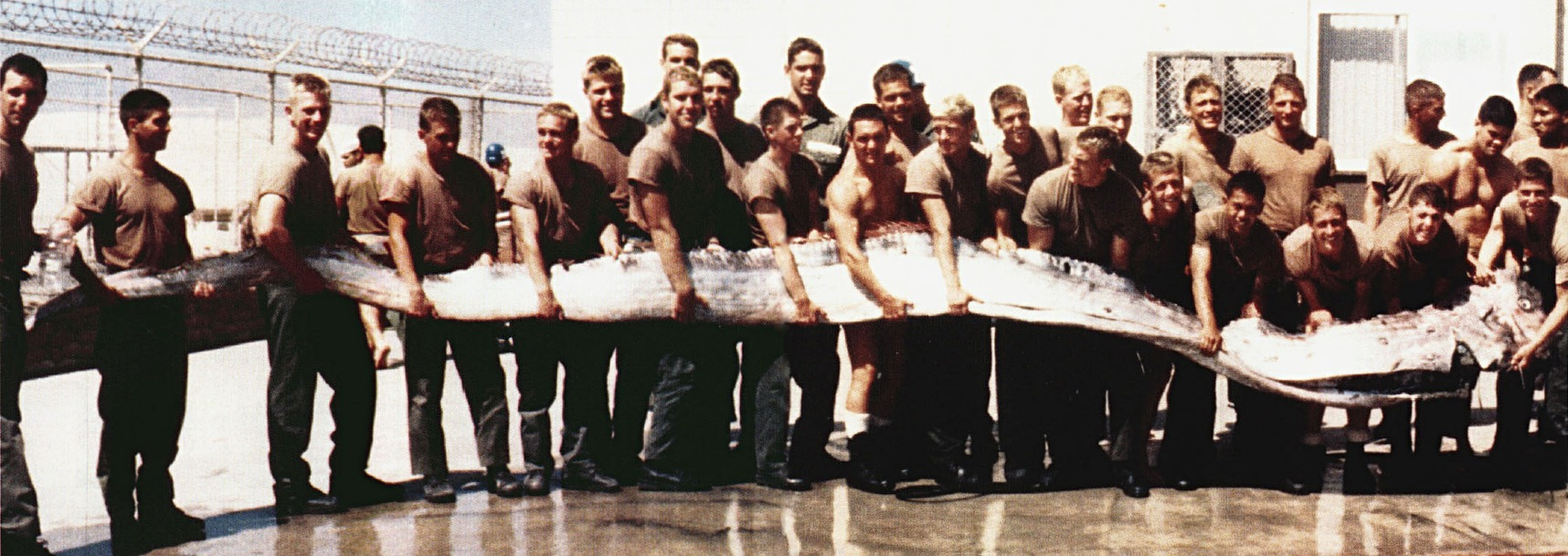
Giant oarfish, Regalecus glesne (Regalecidae), caught in 1996 off Coronado, California

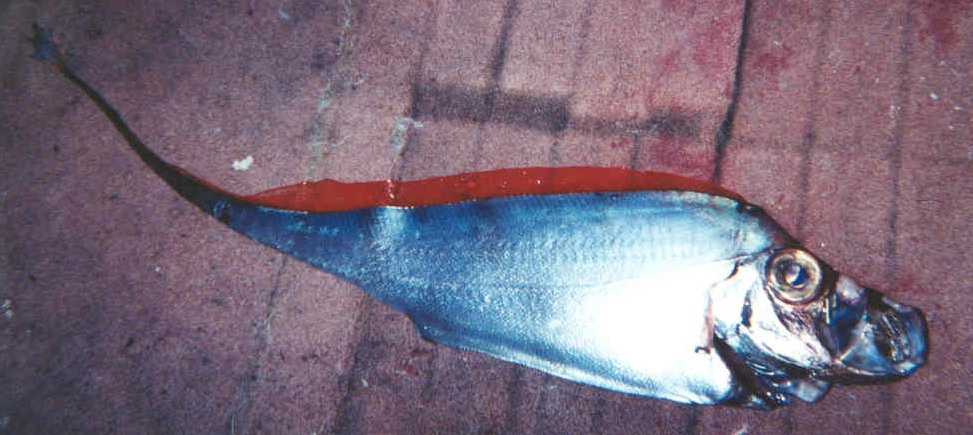
Scalloped ribbonfish, Zu cristatus (Trachipteridae)

The order is occasionally divided into the Lamproidei and the Trachipteroidei. The former are a paraphyletic assemblage, thus effectively synonymous with the entire order, while the latter can be considered a valid suborder. Including fossil taxa, the classification of the Lampriformes in phylogenetic sequence, with the number of living genera and species, can thus be given as:

Suborder Lamproidei

- Genus Bathysoma (fossil)
- Genus Nardovelifer (fossil)
- Genus Iratusichthys (fossil)
- Genus Palaeocentrotus (fossil)
- Genus Whitephippus (fossil)
- Family Turkmenidae (fossil)
- Family Veliferidae — sailfin moonfishes (two genera, six species)
- Family Lampridae — opahs (one genus, two species)

Suborder Trachipteroidei

- Family Lophotidae — crestfishes (two genera, three species)
- Family Radiicephalidae — tapertail (monotypic)
- Family Trachipteridae — ribbonfishes (three genera, 10 species)
- Family Regalecidae — oarfishes (two genera, three species)
