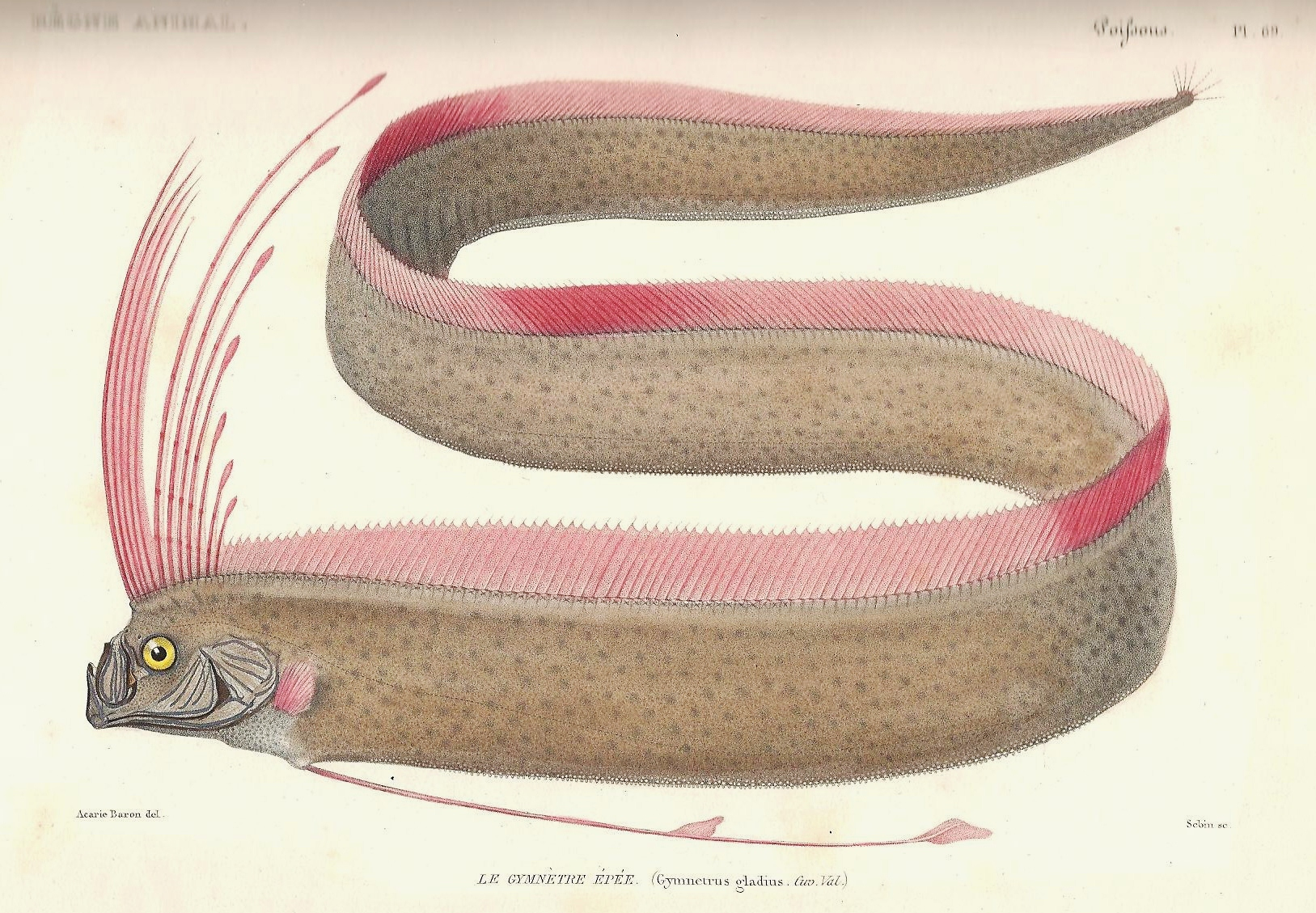
- Giant oarfish, Regalecus glesne

Scientific classification
- Kingdom: Animalia
- Phylum: Chordata
- Class: Actinopterygii
- Division: Teleostei
- Order: Lampriformes
- Family: Regalecidae; Ascanius, 1772

Species
- Regalecus glesne; Regalecus russelii; Agrostichthys parkeri

= Oarfish =

Pelagic lampriform fish belonging to Regalecidae

Oarfish are the three species of large and extremely long pelagic lampriform fish belonging to the small family Regalecidae. Found in areas spanning from temperate ocean zones to tropical ones, yet rarely seen by humans, the oarfish family contains three species in two genera: Regalecus glesne (giant oarfish), Regalecus russelii (Russell's oarfish), and Agrostichthys parkeri (streamer fish).

The giant oarfish is the longest bony fish alive, growing up to about 8 m (26 ft) in length.

The common name oarfish is thought to allude either to their highly compressed and elongated bodies or to the now discredited belief that the fish "row" themselves through the water with their pelvic fins. The family name Regalecidae is derived from the Latin regalis, meaning "royal". Although the larger species are considered game fish and are fished commercially on a small scale, oarfish are rarely caught alive; their flesh is not well regarded for eating due to its gelatinous consistency.

Their rarity and large size, and their habit of lingering at the surface when sick or dying, make oarfish a probable source of historical sea serpent tales. Their beachings before storms have gained them a reputation as harbingers of doom, a folk belief reinforced by the numerous beachings before the disastrous 2011 Tōhoku earthquake and tsunami.

== Description ==
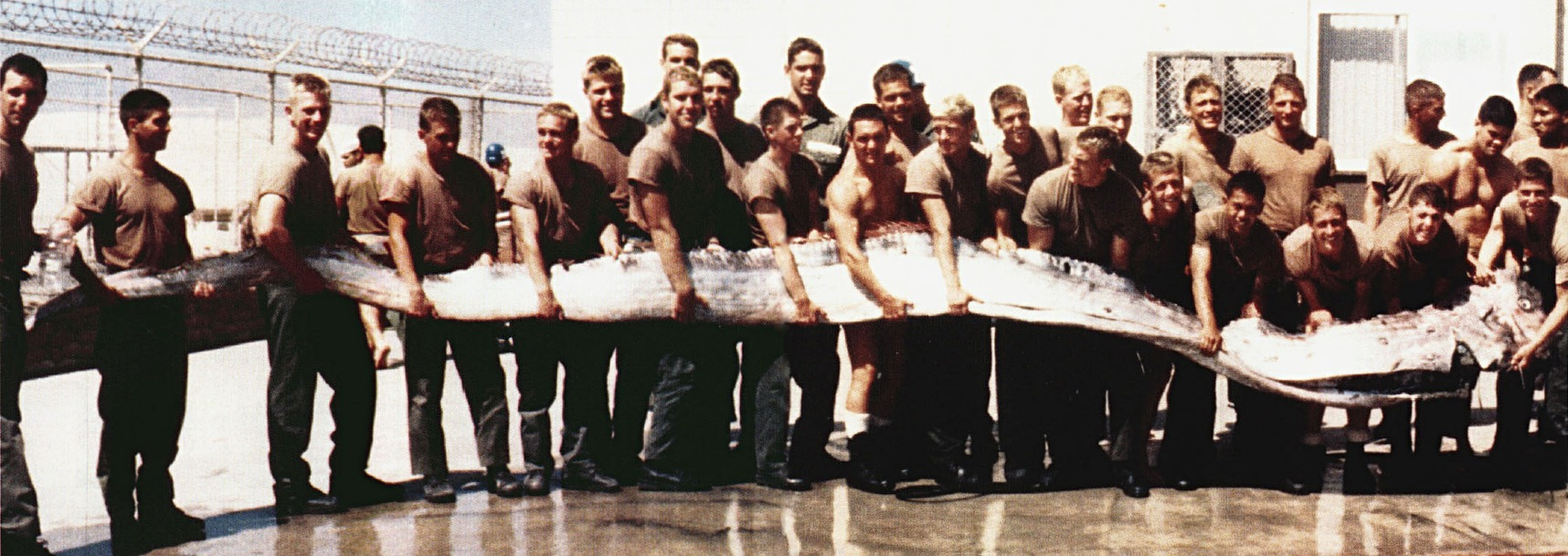
United States Navy SEAL candidates holding a 23-foot (7 m) giant oarfish, found washed up on the shore near San Diego, California, in September 1996

The dorsal fin originates from above the (relatively large) eyes and runs the entire length of the fish. Of the approximately 400 dorsal fin rays, the first 10 to 13 are elongated to varying degrees, forming a trailing crest embellished with reddish spots and flaps of skin at the ray tips. The pelvic fins are similarly elongated and adorned, reduced to one to five rays each. The pectoral fins are greatly reduced and situated low on the body. The anal fin is completely absent and the caudal fin may be reduced or absent as well, with the body tapering to a fine point. All fins lack true spines. At least one account, from researchers in New Zealand, described the oarfish as giving off "electric shocks" when touched.

As in other members of its order, the mouth can be protruded. The body has no scales. In the streamer fish (Agrostichthys parkeri), the skin is clad with hard tubercles; in Regalecus russelii, there are tubercules along the midline of the belly.

All species lack swim bladders, the number of gill rakers is variable, but R. russellii has more than R. glesne. Oarfish are silver in coloration; the body is marked with small dark spots.

The giant oarfish is by far the largest member of the family, at a length of 8 m (26 ft) (Note: There are unconfirmed reports of specimens 11 m (36 ft) and 17 m (56 ft) in length and 270 kg (600 lb) in weight.) The streamer fish reaches 3 m (10 ft) in length, while the largest recorded specimen of Regalecus russelii was 5.4 m (18 ft).

Oarfish frequently practise autotomy, self-amputating the tail, presumably as an anti-predator adaptation. All captured R. russellii over 1.5 metres (4.9 ft) long have autotomized tails; it is thought that they may autotomize their tails repeatedly. The break can occur near the tip of the tail so that only a part of the caudal fin is lost, or it may involve a few caudal vertebrae; in extreme cases the entire tail is lost. The wound heals but the tail does not regenerate.

Hyperossified bones have been documented in several oarfish washed up on the coast of California. These bony rays run along the entire dorsal length of the body. Their function is both to provide structural support to the spine during undulations (tail movement used for locomotion), and to prevent stress fractures that could occur from strong movement. Unlike many deep-sea fish, oarfish have no swim bladders for maintaining depth in the water column. It is likely that this forces more frequent tail undulations as the main mode of depth regulation in oarfish.

== Evolution ==
=== Phylogeny ===
Through the analysis of the mitochondrial genome of Regalecus glesne, the phylogenetic placement of the giant oarfish was further verified. Oarfish are Lampriformes, so placed due to their morphology. Analysis of the mitochondrial genome of an R. glesne specimen clusters the species with Trachipterus trachypterus and Zu cristatus, two other Lampriformes.

=== Taxonomy ===
Oarfish were first described in 1772. Three extant species in two genera are described:

- Giant Oarfish (Regalecus glesne)
- Russell's Oarfish (Regalecus russelii)
- Streamerfish (Agrostichthys parkeri)

== Environment and distribution ==
The oarfish inhabits the epipelagic to mesopelagic ocean layers, ranging from 250–1,000 m (820–3,280 ft) and is rarely seen on the surface. A few have been found still barely alive, but usually if one floats to the surface, it dies due to depressurisation. At the depths the oarfish live, there are few or no currents. As a result, they build little muscle mass and they cannot survive in shallower turbulent water.

The members of the family have a worldwide range, with tropical, subtropical, and warm temperate distributions. The oarfish typically reside in the mesopelagic zone of the sea. However, human encounters with live oarfish are rare, and distribution information is collated from records of oarfish caught or washed ashore.

== Ecology and life history ==
=== Behaviour ===
Rare encounters with divers and accidental catches have supplied what little is known of oarfish ethology (behaviour) and ecology. In 2001, an oarfish was filmed alive in the wild. The 1.5-metre (4.9-foot) fish was spotted by a group of U.S. Navy personnel during the inspection of a buoy in the Bahamas. The oarfish was observed to propel itself by an amiiform mode of swimming; that is, rhythmically undulating the dorsal fin while keeping the body itself straight. Perhaps indicating a feeding posture, oarfish have been observed swimming in a vertical orientation. In this posture, the downstreaming light would silhouette the oarfishes' prey, making them easier to spot.

An oarfish measuring 3.3 m (11 ft) and 63.5 kg (140 lb) was caught in February 2003 using a fishing rod baited with squid at Skinningrove, United Kingdom.

In July 2008, scientists for the first time captured footage of an oarfish swimming in its natural habitat in the mesopelagic zone in the Gulf of Mexico. The fish was estimated to be between five and ten metres (16 and 33 ft) in length. Five observations of apparently healthy oarfish Regalecus glesne by remotely operated vehicles were reported from the northern Gulf of Mexico between 2008 and 2011 at depths within the epipelagic and mesopelagic zones. These observations include the deepest verified record of R. glesne (463–492 m or 1,519–1,614 ft). In the 2011 sighting, an oarfish has been observed to switch from swimming with a vertical posture to swimming laterally, using lateral undulations of its entire body. Oarfish were found to have late or slow flight responses towards approaching remotely operated vehicles, supporting the hypothesis that they have few natural predators.

From December 2009 to March 2010, unusual numbers of the slender oarfish Regalecus russelii appeared in the waters and on the beaches of Japan.

In 2016, angler and zoologist Jeremy Wade's show River Monsters aired footage of Wade swimming with two living oarfish.

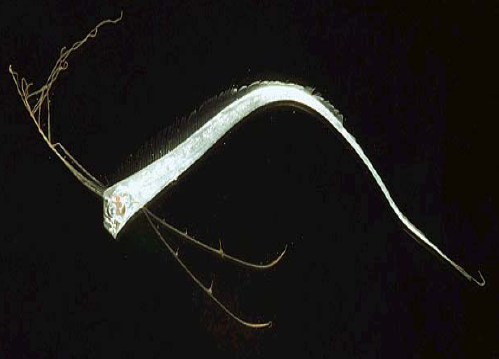
Juvenile Regalecus glesne

=== Feeding ecology ===
Oarfish feed primarily on zooplankton, selectively straining tiny euphausiids, shrimp, and other crustaceans from the water. Small fish, jellyfish, and squid are also taken. It has been observed that oarfish eat by suctioning prey such as plankton blooms.

=== Reproduction and life history ===
The oceanodromous Regalecus glesne is recorded as spawning off Mexico from July to December; all species are presumed to not guard their eggs, and release brightly coloured, buoyant eggs, up to six millimetres (0.24 in) across, which are incorporated into the zooplankton. Based on their reproductive morphology, oarfish are thought to batch spawn. Within each breeding season that may last one or two months, individuals spawn once or multiple times in discrete spawning events before their gonads enter a long, regressive stage of reproductive development.

The eggs hatch after about three weeks into highly active larvae that feed on other zooplankton. The larvae have little resemblance to the adults, with long dorsal and pelvic fins and extensible mouths. Larvae and juveniles have been observed drifting just below the surface. In contrast, adult oarfish are rarely seen at the surface when not sick or injured. It is probable that the fishes go deeper as they mature.

From January to February 2019, researchers tested and recorded the first successful instance of artificial insemination and hatching of Regalecus russellii using gonads from two washed-up specimens. Compared to adults, the body structure of newly hatched oarfish larvae look more compressed. The larvae often swam using mainly their pectoral fins, facing downward, with their mouths constantly open. The larvae were invertebrates but had bones in their head area, as well as fins. They died of starvation four days after they hatched.

Female R. russelii have bifurcated ovaries with a cavity through which the eggs pass before they are laid. The testes of male oarfish are in the coelomic cavity near the digestive tract. There are two separate, disconnected testes, the left one being longer than the one on the right. A single female can produce hundreds of thousands, to millions of eggs. The eggs are laid in the water column, and they float freely in the water.

=== Predators and parasites ===
A 2015 study suggested that the shortfin mako shark and the sperm whale could both be predators of the oarfish, based on patterns of parasite transmission and analysis of oarfish viscera.

== In folklore ==
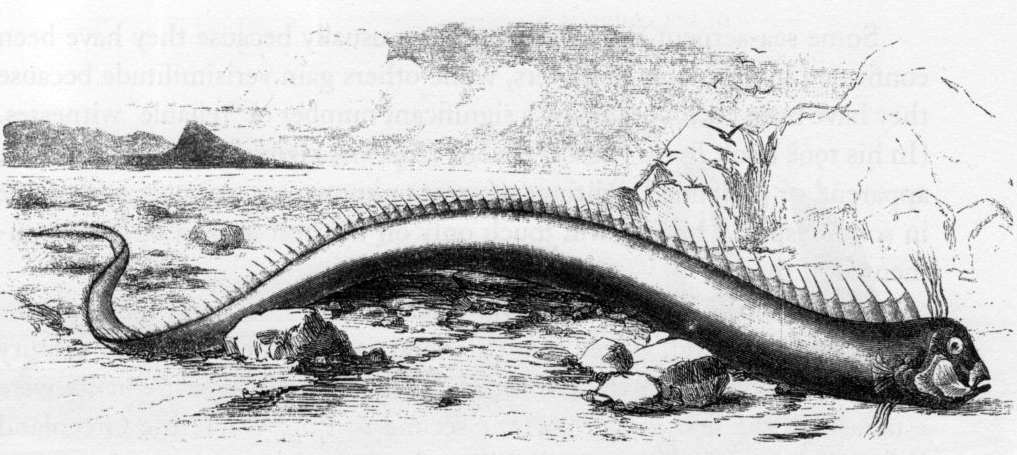
Oarfish that washed ashore on a Bermuda beach on 3 March 1860: it was 16 ft (4.9 m) long and described at the time as a sea serpent.

The slender oarfish, (竜宮の使い "Ryūgū-No-Tsukai"), known in Japanese folklore as the "Messenger from the Sea God's Palace", is said to portend earthquakes. The oarfish has been nicknamed the "doomsday fish" because, historically, appearances of the fish were linked with subsequent natural disasters, namely earthquakes or tsunamis. After the 2011 Tōhoku earthquake and tsunami which killed over 20,000 people, many in Japan pointed to the 20 oarfish washed up on the country's beaches in 2009 and 2010 as being a traditional harbinger of doom. A study published in 2019 states the relationship between the appearance of oarfish and subsequent earthquakes is an "illusory correlation".

== See also ==
- List of fish families
- List of fish common names
