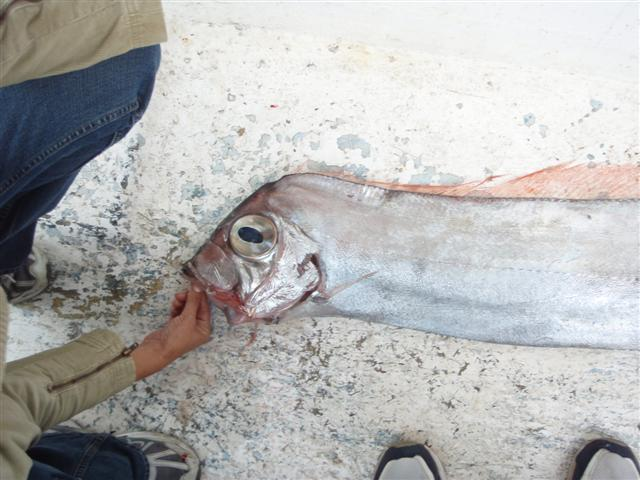
- Trachipterus arcticus collected in USA.

Conservation status
- Least Concern (IUCN 3.1)

Scientific classification
- Kingdom: Animalia
- Phylum: Chordata
- Class: Actinopterygii
- Division: Teleostei
- Order: Lampriformes
- Family: Trachipteridae
- Genus: Trachipterus
- Species: T. arcticus

Binomial name
- Trachipterus arcticus Brünnich, 1771

= Trachipterus arcticus =

Dealfish

Species of fish

Trachipterus arcticus is a species of ribbonfish found predominantly in the North Atlantic Ocean, with one report from the Mediterranean Sea. They are rarely encountered by humans due to their deep-sea habitat and the fact that they are of no commercial value. This species is commonly referred to as the dealfish to differentiate it from the six other ribbonfish species in the family Trachipteridae.

== Taxonomy ==
There is evidence that dealfish should be divided into two separate species, as dealfish found in the Northern and Western Atlantic show some genetic differences.

== Appearance ==
Dealfish have a long, slender, eel-like body. They are a bright silver in colour, often with faint black spots along the flanks and the pink dorsal fin runs the full length of the body. The tail is very small and the underside is free of pectoral or pelvic fins. The maximum size of this species is thought to be 8–9 feet in length, although they are typically around half of this size.

== Distribution and habitat ==
Dealfish are mostly found in the North Atlantic Ocean from Norway and Iceland to Madeira. They are also present in the North Sea and in the Mediterranean Sea (one record). They are also found off along the coast of the United States of America (which is also possibly a separate species). Dealfish are generally found far out to sea and far away from land masses in waters of around 300 to 1000 metres deep. While they are found in deep water they do not live or feed on the seabed and instead live in the pelagic (mid-water) zone. Dealfish are thought to feed predominately by hunting small fish and squid.

== Life cycle ==
The life cycle and behaviour of the dealfish are poorly understood. They are thought to spend most of their life as in solitude, but are believed form into large groups from time to time. It is currently unknown whether this is done for feeding, spawning or some other purpose. Dealfish are not recognised as a food fish anywhere in the world, and are of no interest at all to commercial fisheries, with any dealfish caught by commercial vessels usually being discarded at sea. Due to being a deep-water species, dealfish are rarely encountered by humans.
