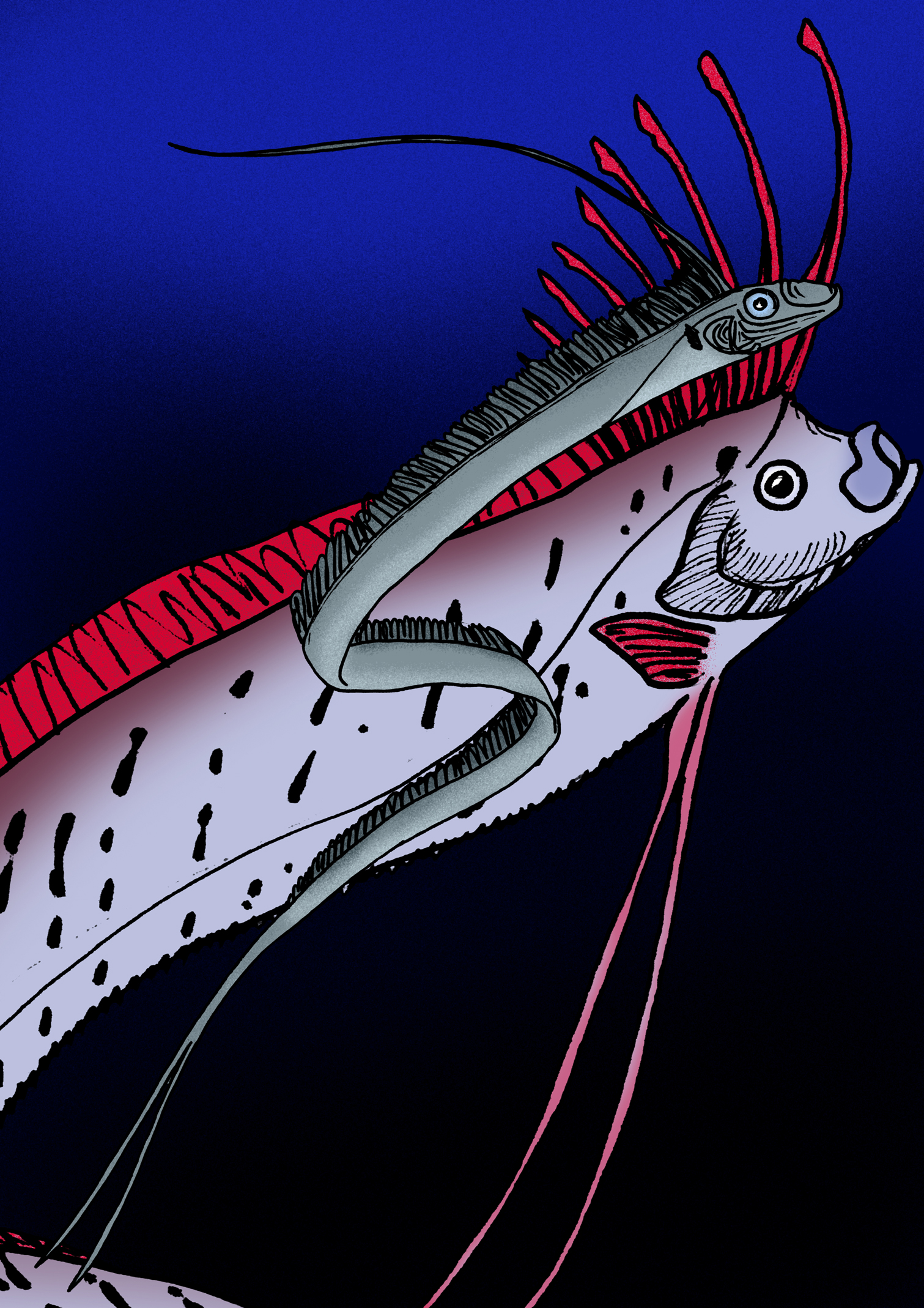
- Comparison of A. parkeri (foreground) with Regalecus glesne (background)

Conservation status
- Least Concern (IUCN 3.1)

Scientific classification
- Kingdom: Animalia
- Phylum: Chordata
- Class: Actinopterygii
- Division: Teleostei
- Order: Lampriformes
- Family: Regalecidae
- Genus: Agrostichthys; Phillipps, 1924
- Species: A. parkeri

Binomial name
- Agrostichthys parkeri (Benham, 1904)

Synonyms
- Regalecus parkeri Benham, 1904

= Agrostichthys =

Species of fish

Agrostichthys parkeri, also called the streamer fish, streamerfish, or Benham's streamerfish, is a species of oarfish. Only seven identified specimens have been examined, with few found fully intact, and have mainly been found in the Southern Ocean. Agrostichthys parkeri belongs to the Regalecidae (oarfish) family in the Lampriformes order and is the only known member of its genus. This species has been known to grow up to 3 metres (9.8 ft) long and has a ribbon-like body, two large eyes, a protruding mouth and long filamentous rays originating at the head. Due to only seven specimens being found, only the distribution and anatomy of Agrostichthys parkeri can be documented.

== Etymology ==
The fish is named in memory of Benham's predecessor, zoologist Thomas Jeffery Parker (1850–1897), of the University of Otago in New Zealand, who made a "careful study" of the anatomy of Regalecus glesne in the year 1886.

== Anatomy and morphology ==
Agrostichthys parkeri has an elongated, vertically compressed body which slims down to a point at the end. The body is not covered in scales, but rather small, horny nodules (dermal tubercles) that extend in longitudinal rows down the length of the body. Agrostichthys parkeri has a defined, protruding mouth with outer enlarged maxillae on a small, slender head that continues seamlessly right into the elongated body. Only the upper jaw protrudes, forming a long, tubular opening. Agrostichthys parkeri has two large, circular eyes with dark irises and clear pupils. Its dorsal fin has two parts, one part a triangular-like fin starting on its head right behind its eyes and the second part a low fin that extends all the way down the body to the caudal fin. Two filamentous rays (specimens have been known to have up to seven rays) also extend from the front of the dorsal fin, where one ray is much longer than the other ray and extends to almost the entire length of the body. Most specimens appeared to be missing their caudal fins, which naturally would be divided in two like scissors, showing that it is common to lose their caudal fins in nature. Agrostichthys parkeri has around 175 to 180 vertebra bones. Right behind the head, the vertebra bones are similar in diameter and length, but farther down the body, both the diameter and length decrease. The color of Agrostichthys parkeri is mainly shiny, bright, bluish silver with vertical dusky bands on the back and underside. Apart from the shiny silver of the body, the head has a slight reddish tint to it. Melanophores cover the area of the face from around the mouth, to the nose openings, and above the brain. The dorsal fin that extends the length of the body is bright pink with dark bands. Although not much is known about the reproduction of Agrostichthys parkeri, due to the study on a large specimen caught in Napier, New Zealand, it is known that A. parkeri eggs are a pale amber color, and are about 4 mm in diameter.

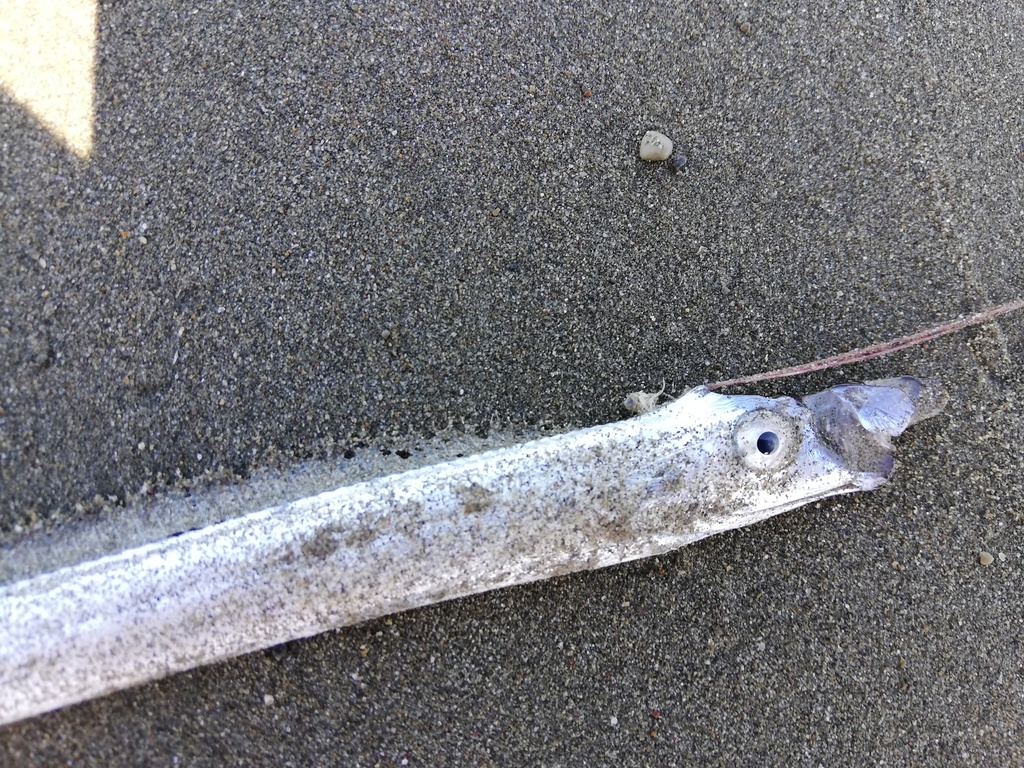
Photo of beached specimen

== Distribution ==
Agrostichthys parkeri has mainly been found in the Southeastern Atlantic Ocean and around New Zealand, off northern Tasmania. The latitudinal distribution of specimens caught is from 39°N to 42°S. The specimens around New Zealand were found at depth of about 12 to 108 metres (39 to 354 ft) from mid-water trawling but have also been caught in deep waters, going from depths of 500 to 5,000 metres (1,600 to 16,400 ft). From the A. parkeri specimens found, it appears to be common around the southwestern Pacific Ocean. One specimen was also found washed up on a beach in Playa Union on the southern tip of South America in Chubut, Argentina. Specimens have only been found in New Zealand, waters around Australia, southern Africa and Argentinian seas. In all cases, A. parkeri has been found in solitary.
