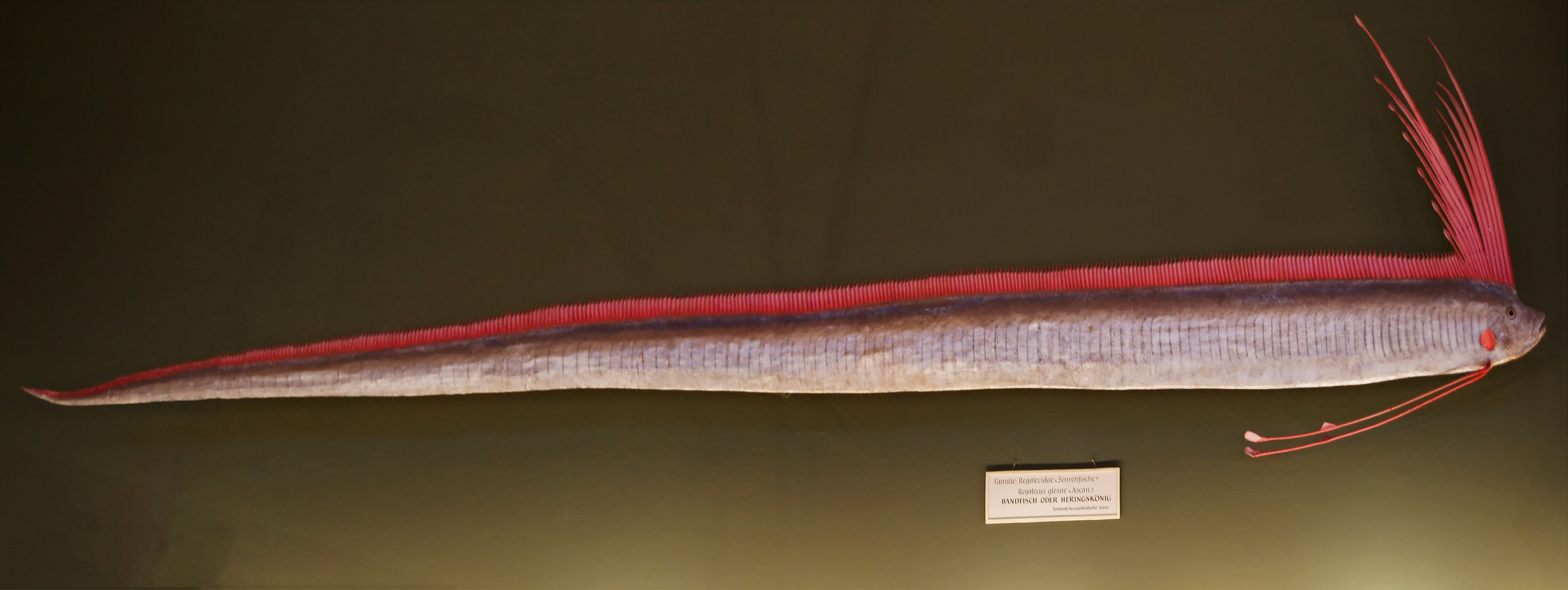
- Taxidermied specimen of R. glesne in the Naturhistorisches Museum Wien

Scientific classification
- Domain: Eukaryota
- Kingdom: Animalia
- Phylum: Chordata
- Class: Actinopterygii
- Order: Lampriformes
- Family: Regalecidae
- Genus: Regalecus; Ascanius, 1772

Synonyms
- Xiphicthis Swainson, 1839

= Regalecus =

Oceanic oarfish

Genus of fishes

Regalecus is a fish genus of the family Regalecidae, commonly called oarfish, with these currently recognized species:

- Regalecus glesne (P. Ascanius, 1772), giant oarfish or king of herrings
- Regalecus russelii (G. Cuvier, 1816)
