= Trachipterus fukuzakii =

Conservation status
- Least Concern (IUCN 3.1)

Scientific classification
- Kingdom: Animalia
- Phylum: Chordata
- Class: Actinopterygii
- Division: Teleostei
- Order: Lampriformes
- Family: Trachipteridae
- Genus: Trachipterus
- Species: T. fukuzakii

Binomial name
- Trachipterus fukuzakii Fitch, 1964

Species of fish

Trachipterus fukuzakii, the tapertail ribbonfish, is a species of ray-finned fish within the family Trachipteridae, found in the Eastern Pacific Ocean from southern California to northern Peru. It is an epipelagic to mesopelagic species, being found in open oceans at depths to about 500 metres (1,640 ft). It grows to lengths of 107.1 to 143 centimetres (42.2 to 56.3 in) in total length. T. fukuzakii has been classified as a 'Least concern' species by the IUCN Red List, as it has a large distribution and no known major threats, nor is it specifically conserved for or caught for any economic reason.
