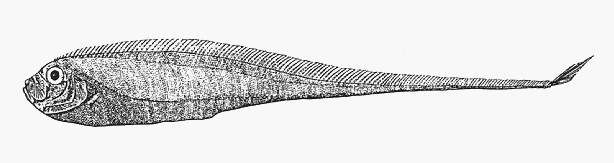

Conservation status
- Least Concern (IUCN 3.1)

Scientific classification
- Kingdom: Animalia
- Phylum: Chordata
- Class: Actinopterygii
- Order: Lampriformes
- Family: Trachipteridae
- Genus: Zu
- Species: Z. elongatus

Binomial name
- Zu elongatus Heemstra & Kannemeyer, 1984

= Zu elongatus =

Species of ray-finned fish

Zu elongatus, or the taper-tail ribbonfish, is a species of ray-finned fish within the family Trachipteridae. The species distribution is poorly known, and while it likely lives in temperate and tropical waters of all oceans, but has only been encountered in the Atlantic Ocean- off the coasts of Namibia and the western Cape of South Africa- and in the Pacific Ocean off New Zealand. It inhabits mesopelagic waters up to 1,200 metres (3,940 ft) below sea level. Other common names for this species include "scalloped dealfish" and spitsstert-lintvis in Afrikaans.

== Biology ==
Zu elongatus grows to a length of 120 centimetres (47 in) and has a silvery grey coloration with bars along the sides. The pelvic fins of adults are bright red. The dorsal fins lack spines but are composed of 142-147 soft rays. Juveniles are epipelagic, spending time near the surface, and have trailing, elongated dorsal and pelvic fins that mimic siphonophores and jellyfish. The diet of the species consists of crustaceans, small fish and squid. Eggs of Zu elongatus are large and free floating with a bright red coloration.

When preserved in alcohol, the bodies of adults are generally tan in color, with a dark triangular area on the front of the head that extends onto the lips and the gular area. The posterior part of the dorsal fin and caudal fin are black, to the base of the latter is pale.

== Conservation ==
Zu elongatus has been classified as a 'Least concern' species by the IUCN Red List, as despite having little information about its population and ecology, there are no major threats to any of its populations.
