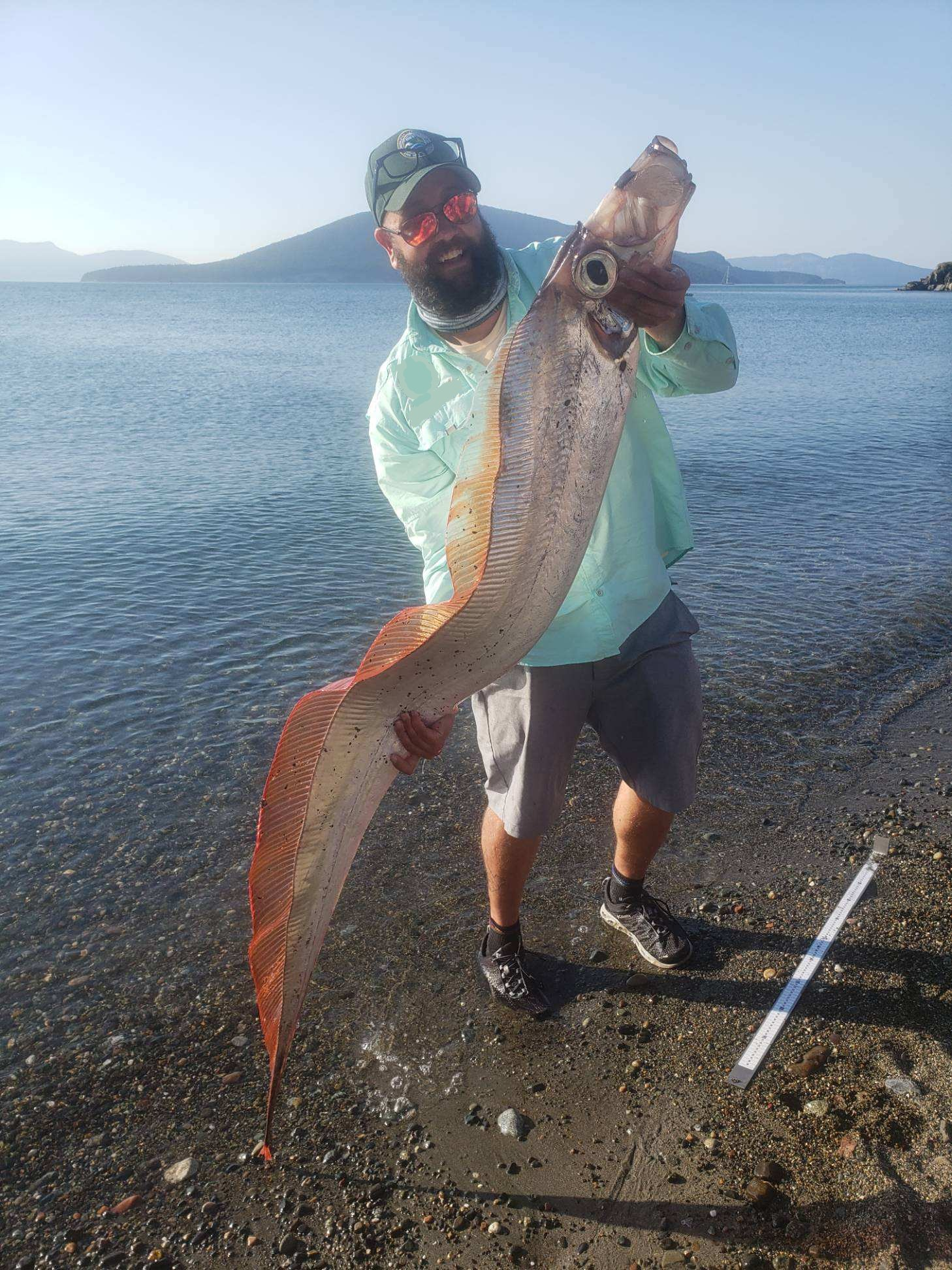
- King-of-the-salmon in Anacortes, Washington

Conservation status
- Least Concern (IUCN 3.1)

Scientific classification
- Kingdom: Animalia
- Phylum: Chordata
- Class: Actinopterygii
- Order: Lampriformes
- Family: Trachipteridae
- Genus: Trachipterus
- Species: T. altivelis

Binomial name
- Trachipterus altivelis Kner, 1859

Synonyms
- Trachypterus rex-salmonorum Jordan & Gilbert, 1894

= King-of-the-salmon =

Species of fish

King-of-the-salmon (Trachipterus altivelis) is a species of ribbonfish in the family Trachipteridae. Its common name comes from the legends of the Makah people west of the Strait of Juan de Fuca, which hold that this fish leads the salmon annually to their spawning grounds. Catching or eating king-of-the-salmon was forbidden, as it was feared killing one would stop the salmon run. This myth is reflected by a former specific epithet used for this fish, rex-salmonorum, rex being Latin for "king". The king-of-the-salmon is found in the eastern Pacific Ocean from Alaska to Chile. It is usually found in the open ocean to a depth of 900 meters (3,000 feet), though adults sometimes feed on the sea bottom.

This species attains a known length of 1.83 meters (6.0 feet), though larger specimens have been reported. It has an elongated, ribbon-shaped body with a long dorsal fin running along its entire length. The dorsal fin is highest in the front and contains 165–184 soft rays. The pectoral fins are small and rounded, the pelvic fins are greatly reduced, and the anal fin is absent. The dorsal lobe of the caudal fin, containing 7–8 rays, points upward at a 45° angle to the body axis, while the ventral lobe is reduced to 5–6 spines. The eyes are large and the mouth is small but highly protrusible. The fish is silver with crimson-colored fins; the area above the eye is blackish.

Reproduction is oviparous, with pelagic eggs and larvae. Spawning appears to take place year-round with no specific peak. In the Northern Hemisphere, the density of the eggs is greatest towards the southern extents of its range, suggesting a relationship between spawning and warmer water temperatures. The eggs measure 2.6–3.7 mm (0.10–0.15 in) in diameter. The juveniles have longer fins than the adults, especially the first 5 rays of the dorsal fin and the pelvic fins, which are elongated with rows of pigmented swellings. Juvenile coloration is silvery with red fins and 3–5 dark blotches on the sides above the lateral line.

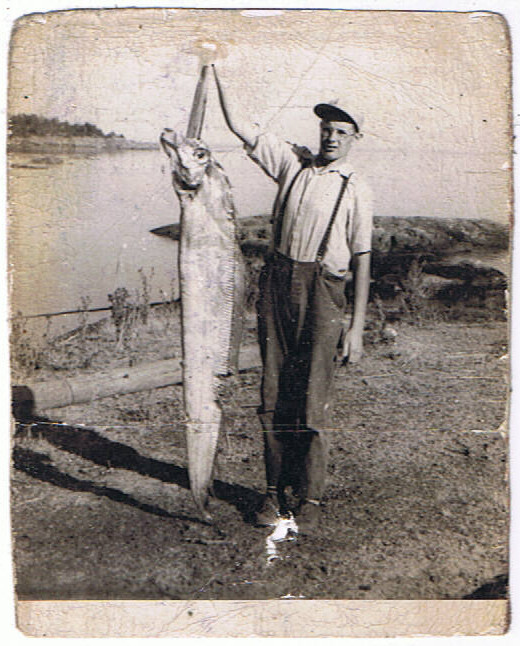
King-of-the-Salmon, landed by Ernie Bent at Race Rocks, Victoria, B.C., 1950.

Large king-of-the-salmon feed on copepods, krill, small pelagic fishes, young rockfishes, squid, and octopus, while small individuals feed on copepods, polychaete worms, and fish larvae. Off the coast of Oregon, juveniles have different diets depending on habitat. Offshore juveniles feed mainly on the hyperiid amphipod Phronima, also taking small numbers of other amphipods, copepods, and free-floating fish scales. Inshore juveniles feed mainly on copepods and fish larvae. Known predators of small king-of-the-salmon include the bigeye thresher shark (Alopias superciliosus) and the longnose lancetfish (Alepisaurus ferox). This species is occasionally encountered while trolling for salmon, in nets, or washed up on the shore.
