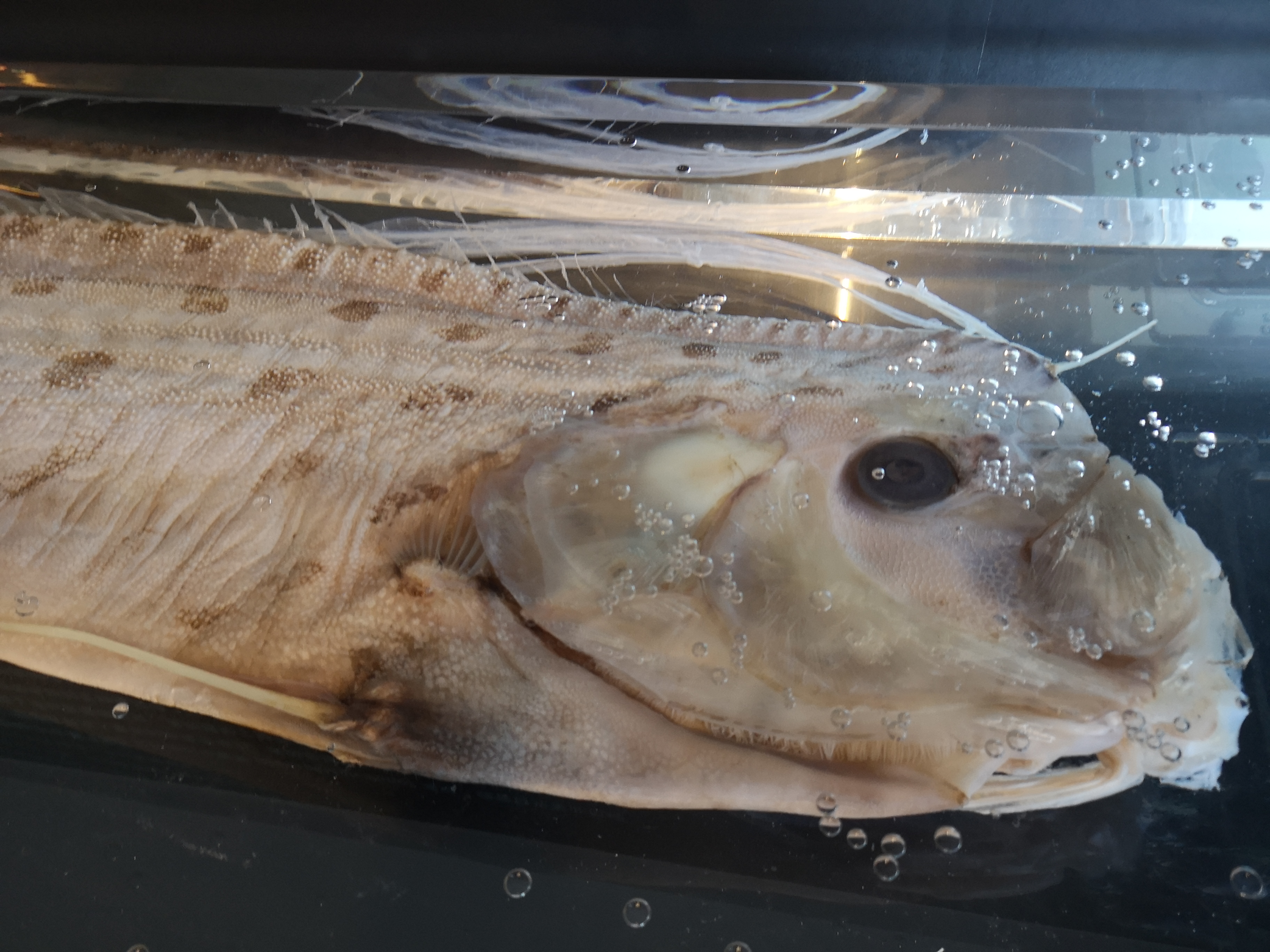
- Preserved specimen of R. russelii in Academia Sinica, Taipei

Conservation status
- Least Concern (IUCN 3.1)

Scientific classification
- Kingdom: Animalia
- Phylum: Chordata
- Class: Actinopterygii
- Division: Teleostei
- Order: Lampriformes
- Family: Regalecidae
- Genus: Regalecus
- Species: R. russelii

Binomial name
- Regalecus russelii (Cuvier, 1816)

Synonyms
- Gymnetrus russelii Cuvier, 1816; Regalecus russellii (Cuvier, 1816)

= Regalecus russelii =

Species of oarfish

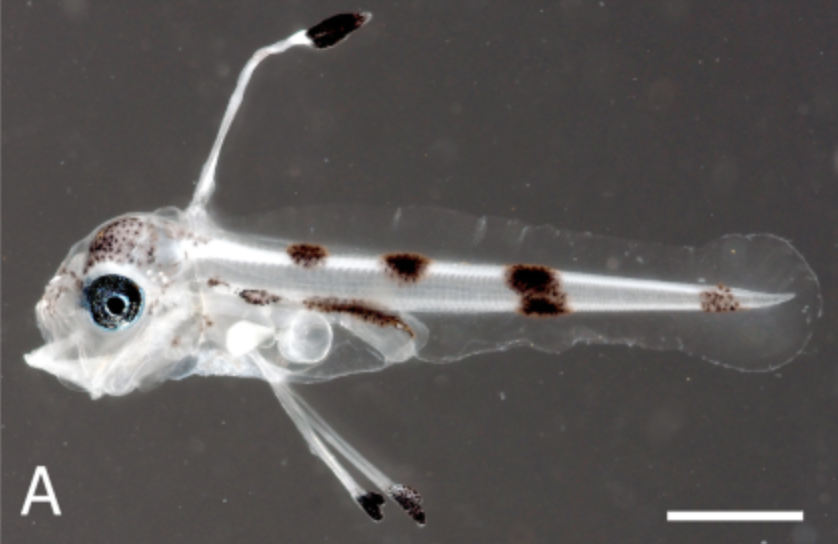
Larve R. russelii 2 days after hatching

Regalecus russelii, or Russell's oarfish, is a species of oarfish in the family Regalecidae. It is a broadly-distributed marine fish, found in waters in the bathypelagic zone. R. russelii is a scaleless, elongate and ribbonlike fish, growing up to 8 metres (26 ft) in length.

== Taxonomy ==
Regalecus russelii is a member of the fish genus Regalecus and oarfish family Regalecidae. The genus currently includes only one other species of oarfish, Regalecus glesne. R. russelii is part of the order Lampriformes, which represents tube-eyes and ribbonfishes, and is part of the larger class of ray-finned fishes called Actinopterygii.

== Anatomy and morphology ==
Regalecus russelii can grow up to 8 meters in length, and it has two dorsal fin crests that can reach 1 meter high. The species can be distinguished by its red dorsal fin crests, light brown head, and scaleless, silver body. The body is covered by dermal tubercles, which are concentrated along the ventral and lower side regions of the body. Each dorsal fin has 333 to 371 rays, which shorten and then become longer at the middle of the body. Its pelvic fin contains more than three membranous appendages and is a single elongated ray. The stomach has a long caecum, beginning posterior of the abdomen and extending to the end of the body. Muscle is contained in intermuscular septa, with dorsal and ventral septa along with teleost's characteristic horizontal, vertical, and transverse septa. Older R. russelii often have a posterior stump-like tail, which is a consequence of self-amputation but show no signs of regeneration. In some specimens, this tail appears jagged and unhealed, consistent with a fresh self-amputation.

The majority of these fish have toothless jaws, but small vestigial teeth have been observed in some. There are 113 to 122 vertebrae present in the spine. The skeleton contains distinct areas of hyperostosis, or hyper-ossified bones, that are most prominent on the dorsal pterygiophores, but is also present on the cleithrum and along the supraoccipital bone. The rest of the skeleton is cartilaginous. The hyperostosis provides additional support to the pterygiophores during movement. It has also been hypothesized that this hyper ossification acts as a lever for the oarfish dorsal fins, which contributes to the organism's buoyancy. The presence of hyperostosis varies among R. russelii of different ages and sizes; it is present in most large adult fish, and many smaller fish lack these regions of swollen bones. R. russelii's flaccid skeleton lacks mineralization, which is advantageous in maintaining buoyancy in deep waters.

One of the few biological structures that has been studied is the otolith, which is a structure in the inner ear that is involved in sensing movement and gravity. R. russelii have very small sagittal otoliths that are difficult to observe; their small size may indicate that they play an insignificant role in sensing. Researchers have been able to perform CT scans and rare, invasive studies on this structure of a deceased R. russelii to better understand its physiological significance.

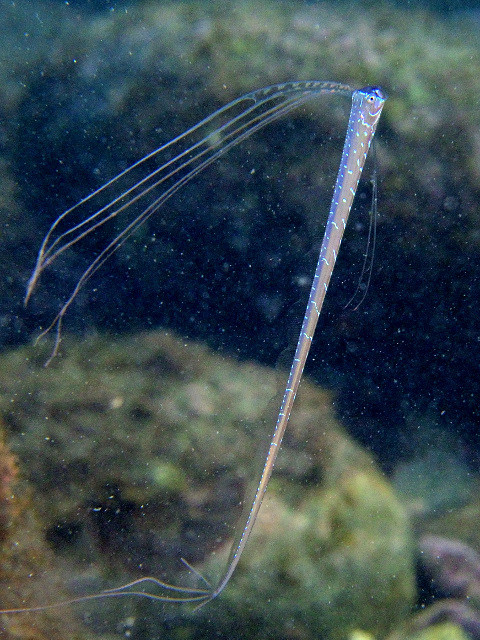
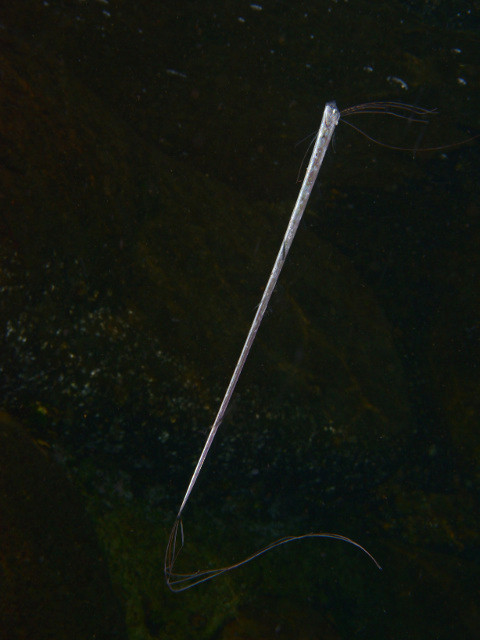
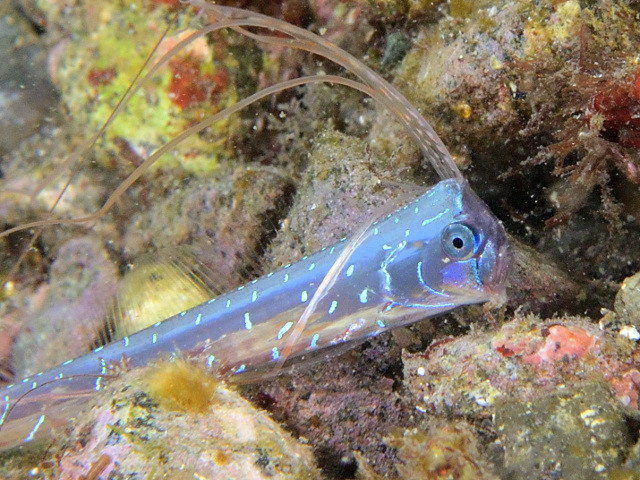
Juveniles, Japan

== Life history traits ==
In addition to the otolith, recent studies have revealed more information about the reproductive organs of the oarfish. Using photographs, histological cross-sections, and measurements of four samples of R. russelii, researchers were able to qualitatively describe the sexual organs of the species. These studies have shown that female oarfish have bifurcated ovaries containing a cavity through which the eggs pass before leaving the body of the oarfish. Testes on male oarfish are located in a similar place as the ovaries of female oarfish, near the digestive tract called the coelomic cavity. The oarfish have two separate, disconnected testes and the left testes observed were longer than the right testes. An analysis of these findings led researchers to conclude that R. russelii are likely batch spawning fish that produce a large number of offspring every breeding season.

Based on a study that performed an artificial insemination with the eggs and sperm from a pair of deceased R. russelii samples, the morphology of the oarfish larvae was able to be examined. This study described the larvae as having long yet compact bodies. The larvae were invertebrates but had bones in their head area, as well as fins. The swimming patterns of the larvae were analyzed, and it was determined that they primarily used their pectoral fins for motility.

== Distribution ==
Regalecus russelii lives in deep waters near areas such as Japan, California, and Baja California, in waters such as the Pacific, Atlantic, and Indian oceans. The oarfish typically reside in the mesopelagic area of the sea. Since 1901, there have been 19 verified sightings and strandings along the coast of California waters. R. russelii is found around the world equatorially, while Regalecus glesne is found with antitropical distribution. Regalecus glesne are termed mesopelagic fish because they spend most of their time at a depth of around 300–1000M.

In June 2022, a juvenile was seen on the Great Barrier Reef off Queensland, Australia, by a snorkel tour leader. Identification was later made from pictures, by Dr Tyson Roberts, a former researcher at the Smithsonian Tropical Research Institute in Panama.

Between January and February 2024, two Russell's oarfish were first found in Thailand in the Andaman Sea. The first was found between Trang and Satun provinces, and the second was found in Phuket. Their remains are preserved in the Natural History Museum.

The low number of live sightings of oarfish has made it difficult to determine the precise distribution of the Regalecus, and further research is needed.

== Feeding and diet ==
The species uses a feeding stance to see the silhouette of its prey. It feeds on euphausiid crustaceans, small fishes and squid, and uses its protrusile jaws to suck in prey. The oarfish mostly consumes a diet of krill as its energy source, using its jaw to fill its oro-branchial cavity with the crustaceans, that will then be held in the gullet and passed through.

== Conservation ==
There are no specific conservation measures for R. russelii, and it occurs in at least one marine protected area. It has been listed as 'Least concern' by the IUCN Red List.

== Mythology ==
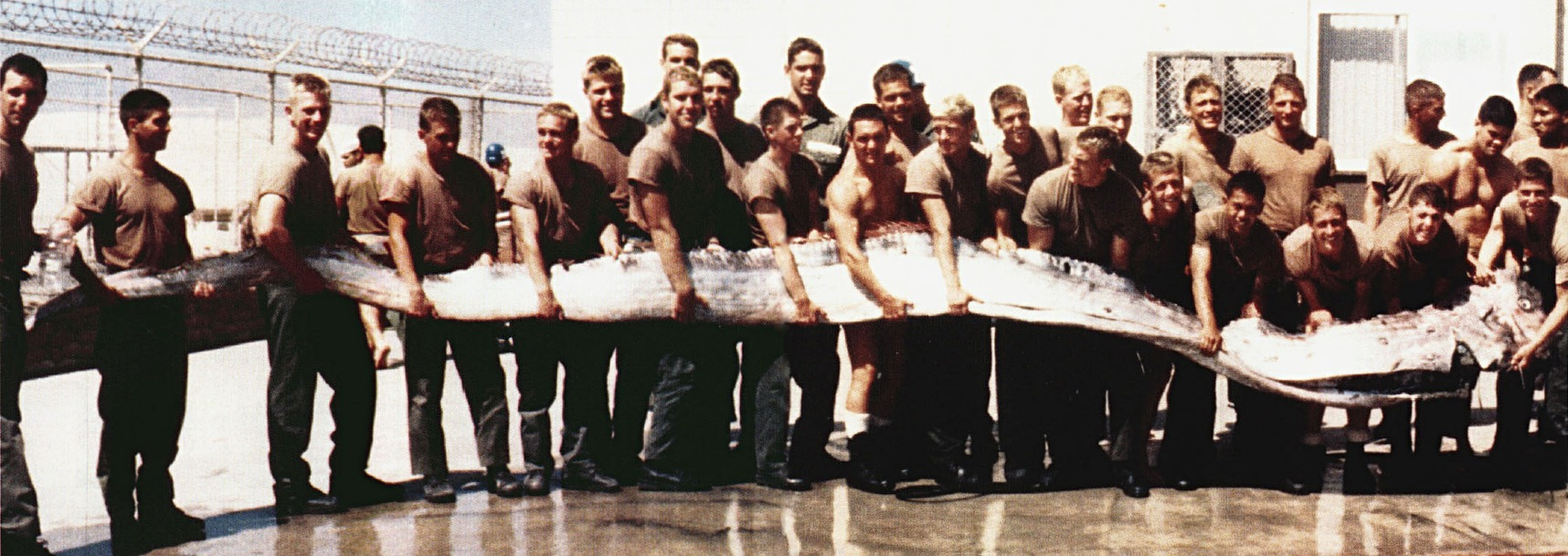
Photograph, widely circulated in Laos, purporting to show American sailors in the Vietnam War, who caught a "Mekong Dragon" in Laos. In reality, the image shows a giant oarfish (the closest relative of Russell's oarfish) caught near San Diego, California in 1996.

In Japanese mythology, oarfish are referred to as "Messengers from the Sea God's Palace" (竜宮の使い ryūgū-no-tsukai).

Two deep sea oarfish were caught live in nets off the coast of Okinawa, Japan January 28, 2019. Both died before making their way into an aquarium inland in the town Motobu. One fisher described the two oarfish squirming in the nets as looking like "real dragons."

=== Earthquakes ===
A belief surrounds the species that they are "harbingers of earthquakes", but there is no scientific evidence or an association established between recorded oarfish sightings and earthquakes.

From December 2009 to March 2010, unusual numbers of this species of oarfish appeared in the waters and on the beaches of Japan. After the 2011 Tōhoku earthquake and tsunami which killed over 20,000 people, many pointed to the oarfish from 2009–2010 to build up this myth.

A 2019 study compared 336 records of deep-sea fish occurrences, including oarfish and slender ribbonfish, with 221 earthquake records, finding only one correlation. Authors concluded that this folklore is deemed to be a superstition attributed to the illusory correlation between appearance of fish and earthquake.

== Parasites ==
- Rhadinorhynchus mariserpentis (Steinauer, Garcia-Vedrenne, Weinstein & Kuris, 2019) Huston, Cribb & Smales, 2020
- Spinitectus gabata Poinar, Weinstein, Garcia-Vedrenne & Kuris, 2014

Despite the relatively limited number of oarfish researched, in 2014 scientists were able to discover a new species of nematode called Spinitectus gabata (Spirurina: Cystidicolidae) within the gastrointestinal tract of a R. russelii off the coast of Japan. S. gabata likely uses the krill the oarfish consumes as an intermediate host, since known Spinitectus species often involve crustaceans as intermediate hosts.

A recent study concerning the parasitization of this species revealed that the shortfin mako shark and the sperm whale could both be predators of the oarfish, based on patterns of parasite transmission. These conclusions were made based on analysis of the visceral tissue of an oarfish recovered by the Catalina Island Marine Institute in Santa Catalina Island, California.
