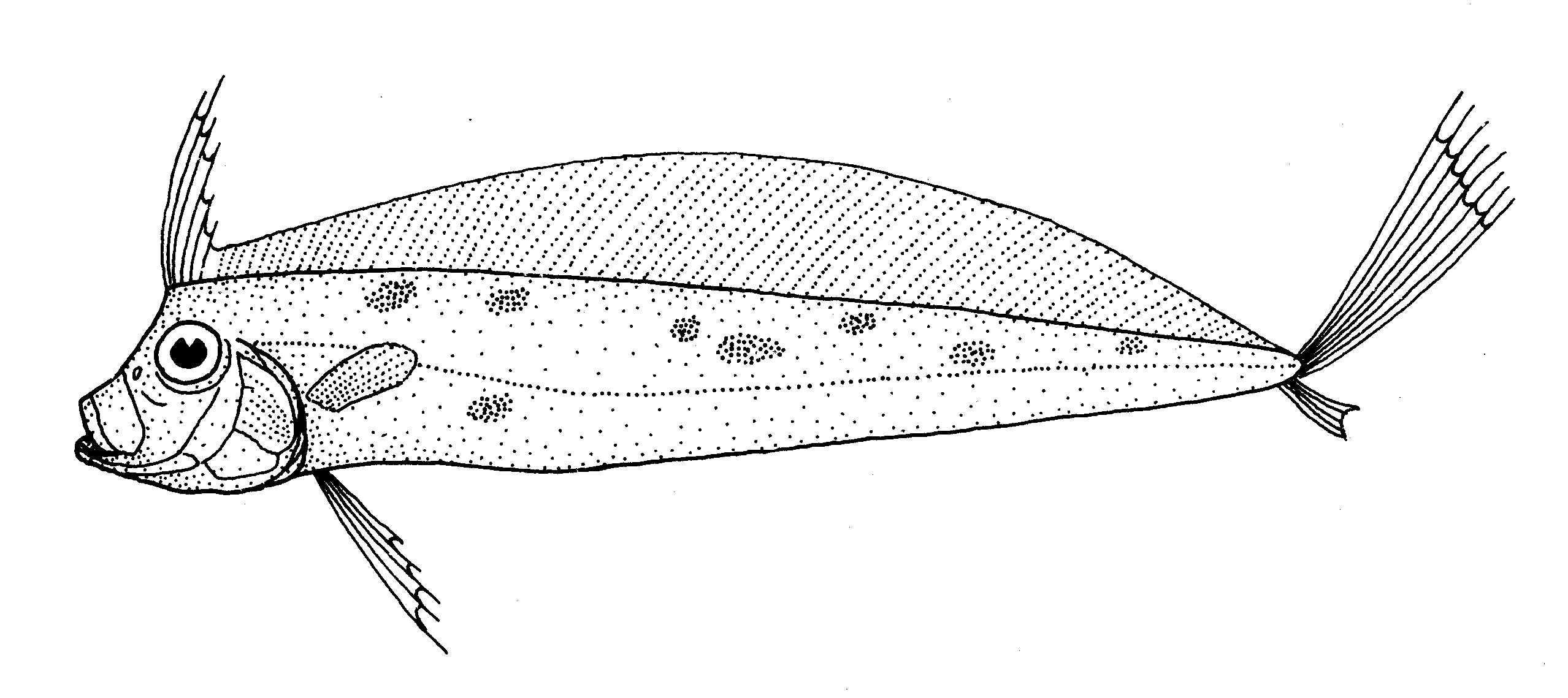
- Drawing by Dr Tony Ayling

Conservation status
- Least Concern (IUCN 3.1)

Scientific classification
- Kingdom: Animalia
- Phylum: Chordata
- Class: Actinopterygii
- Order: Lampriformes
- Family: Trachipteridae
- Genus: Trachipterus
- Species: T. trachypterus

Binomial name
- Trachipterus trachypterus (J. F. Gmelin, 1789)

= Trachipterus trachypterus =

Species of fish

Trachipterus trachypterus, the Mediterranean dealfish, is a ribbonfish of the family Trachipteridae, found in tropical and subtropical seas worldwide. Its length is up to 3 m.
