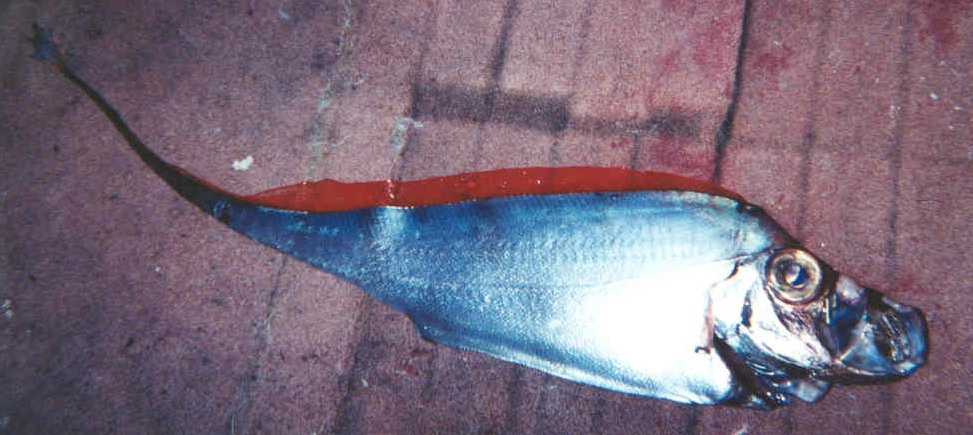
- Scalloped ribbonfish (Z. cristatus)

Scientific classification
- Kingdom: Animalia
- Phylum: Chordata
- Class: Actinopterygii
- Order: Lampriformes
- Family: Trachipteridae
- Genus: Zu; Walters & Fitch, 1960

Species
- Z. cristatus Z. elongatus

= Zu (fish) =

Genus of fishes

Zu is a small genus of ribbonfishes.

== Species ==
There are currently two recognized species within the genus Zu:

- Zu cristatus (Bonelli, 1819) (scalloped ribbonfish)
- Zu elongatus Heemstra & Kannemeyer, 1984 (taper-tail ribbonfish)

The scalloped ribbonfish is found around the oceans of the world in the tropical latitudes, while the taper-tail ribbonfish is limited to the southeast Atlantic.
