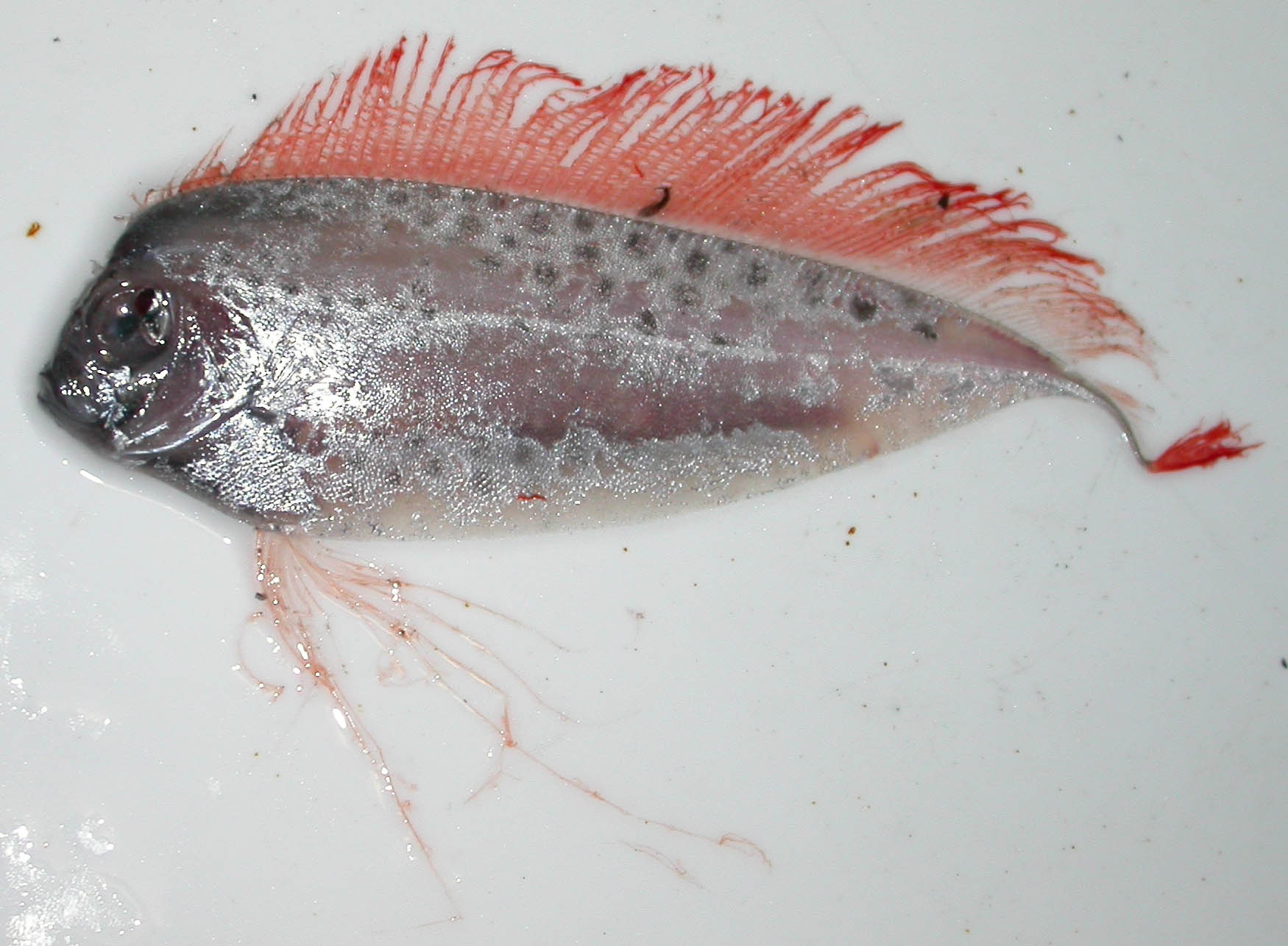

Conservation status
- Least Concern (IUCN 3.1)

Scientific classification
- Kingdom: Animalia
- Phylum: Chordata
- Class: Actinopterygii
- Order: Lampriformes
- Family: Trachipteridae
- Genus: Desmodema
- Species: D. polystictum

Binomial name
- Desmodema polystictum (Ogilby, 1898)

Synonyms
- Trachipterus misakiensis Tanaka, 1908; Trachipterus polystictus (Ogilby, 1898); Trachipterus woodi Smith, 1953; Trachypterus jacksoniensis polystictus Ogilby, 1898

= Desmodema polystictum =

Species of fish

Desmodema polystictum, also called the deal fish, polka-dot ribbonfish, or spotted ribbonfish, is a fish in the family Trachipteridae. It is found near New Zealand, the northwestern Atlantic Ocean, and South Africa. The species became more known when James Douglas Ogilby wrote and published work on the species in 1898.

== Related species ==
- Desmodema lorum, the whiptail ribbonfish, is the only other species in its genus.
