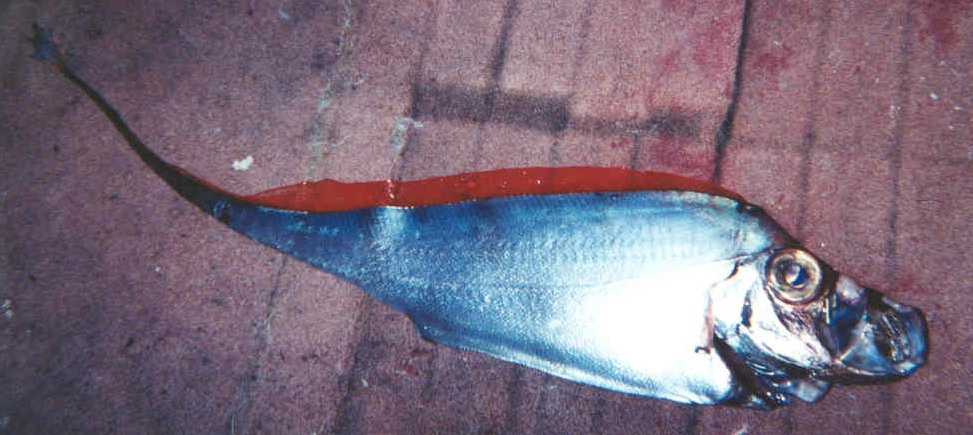
- Adult
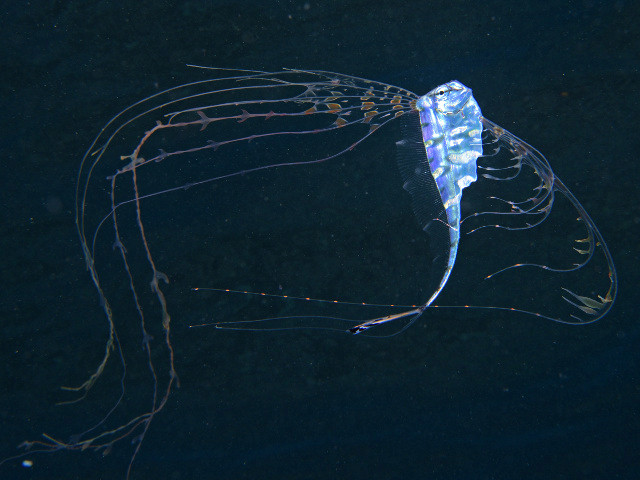
- Juvenile

Conservation status
- Least Concern (IUCN 3.1)

Scientific classification
- Kingdom: Animalia
- Phylum: Chordata
- Class: Actinopterygii
- Order: Lampriformes
- Family: Trachipteridae
- Genus: Zu
- Species: Z. cristatus

Binomial name
- Zu cristatus (Bonelli, 1819)

= Zu cristatus =

Species of fish

Zu cristatus, or the scalloped ribbonfish, is a species of ribbonfish in the family Trachipteridae found circumglobally at tropical latitudes, at depths of around 90 m. It grows up to 118 cm in length, and adult weights are around 4000g. The scalloped ribbonfish is most often found in parts of the Mediterranean Sea. Juvenile specimen sightings are more commonly observed than their adult counterparts, as they favor shallower depths. An adult specimen of Z. cristatus was captured at a depth of 720 m off the cost of Italy. They are reported to eat squid, fish, and crustaceans.

In the past, the binomial name Trachypterus iris was misapplied to this fish.

== Identification ==
Juveniles Z. cristatus under 70 cm in length have a silvery body with dark blotches, a scalloped belly margin and bulb-like structures on the long dorsal and pelvic fins.

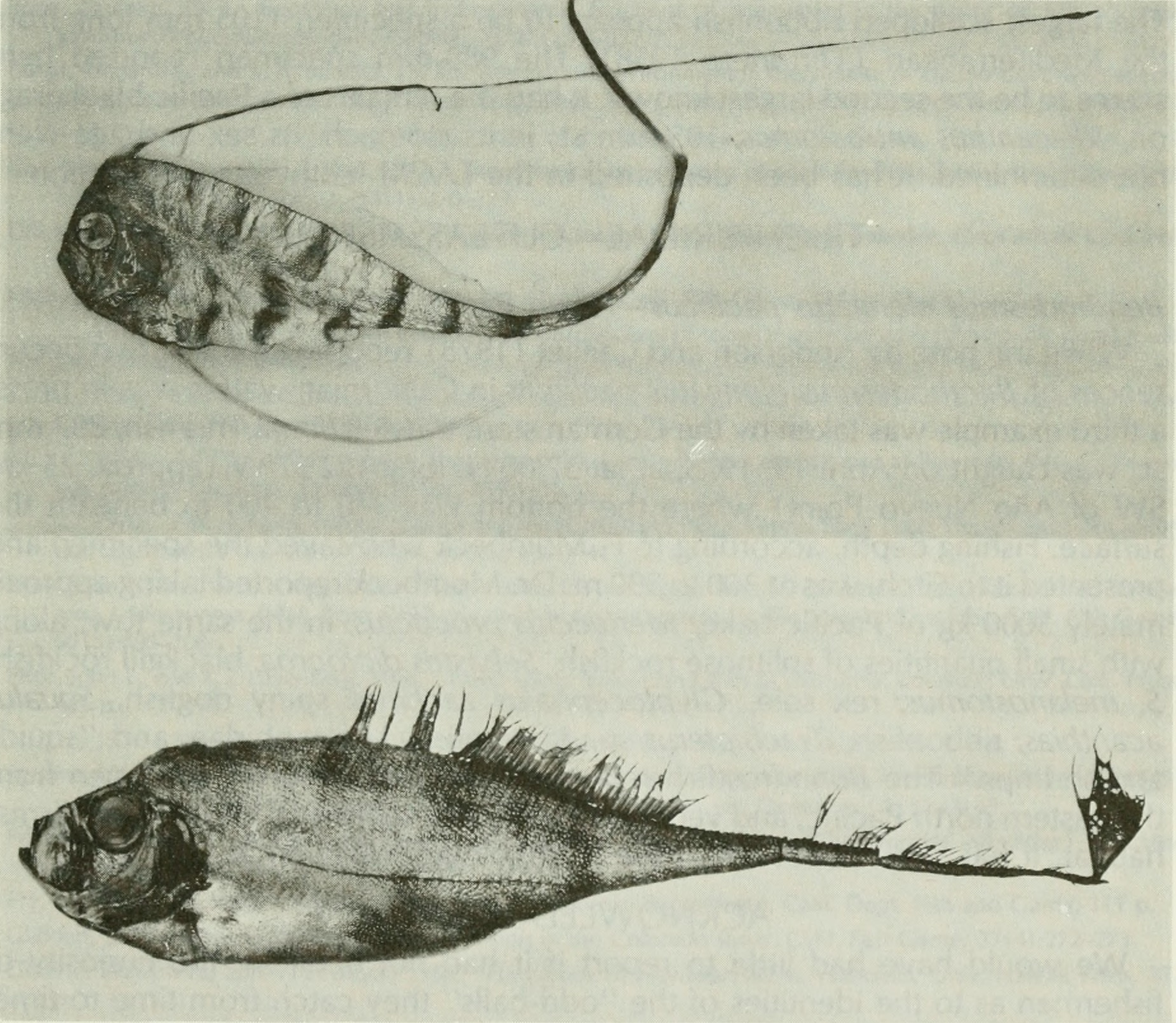
Juvenile (top), adult (bottom)

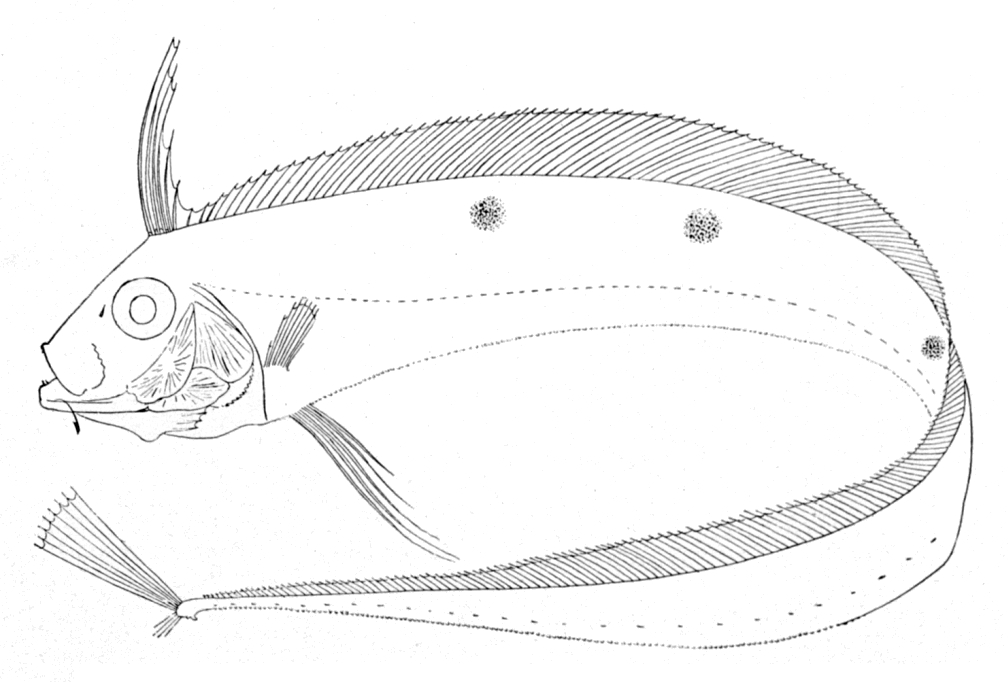
Illustration of a scalloped ribbonfish.
