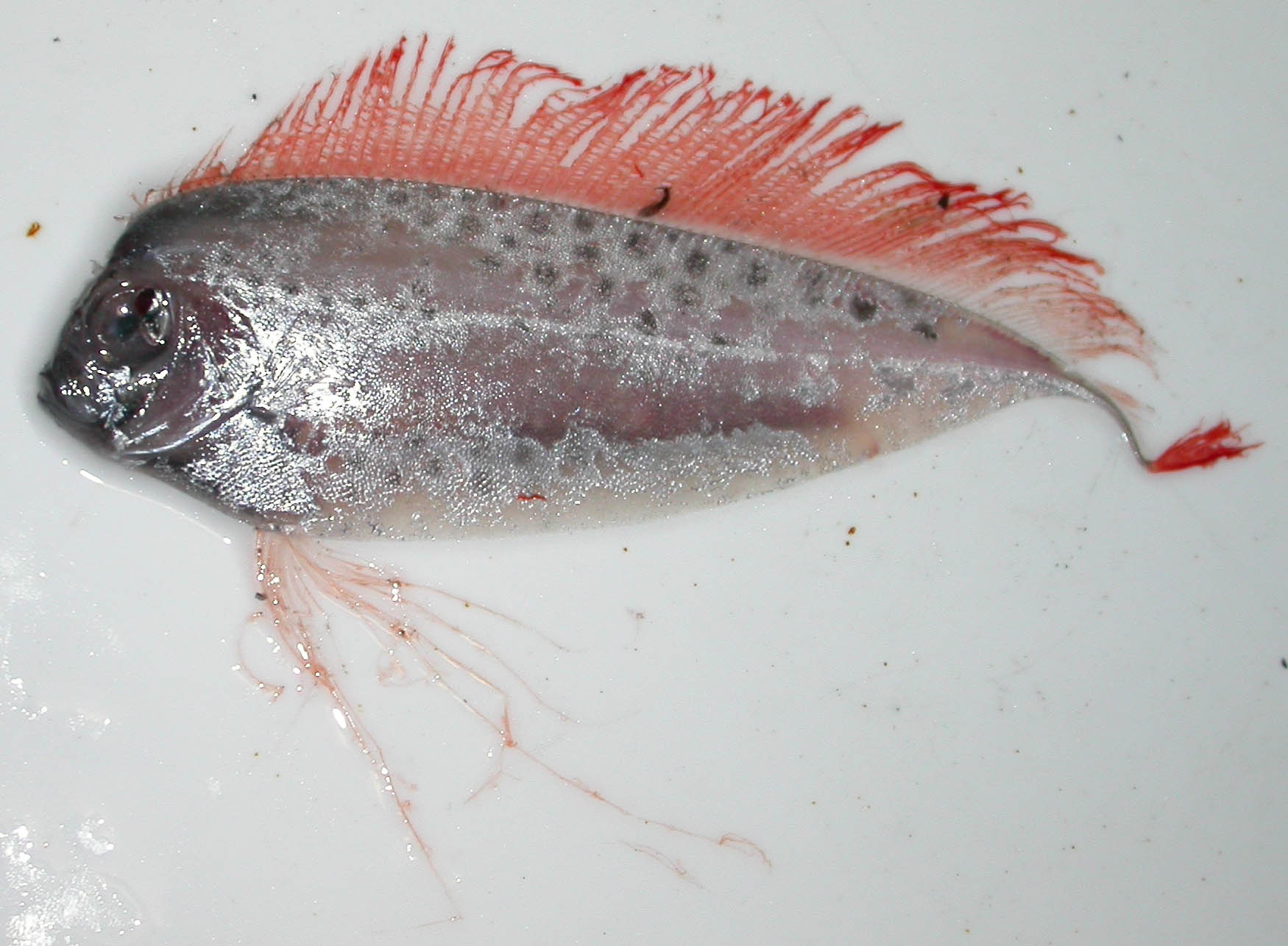
- Polka-dot Ribbonfish (Desmodema polystictum)

Scientific classification
- Domain: Eukaryota
- Kingdom: Animalia
- Phylum: Chordata
- Class: Actinopterygii
- Order: Lampriformes
- Family: Trachipteridae
- Genus: Desmodema; Walters & Fitch, 1960

Genera
- D. lorum D. polystictum

= Desmodema =

Genus of fishes

Desmodema is a small genus of ribbonfishes.

== Species ==
There are currently two recognized species in this genus:

- Desmodema lorum Rosenblatt & J. L. Butler, 1977 (Whiptail ribbonfish)
- Desmodema polystictum (J. D. Ogilby, 1898) (Polka-dot ribbonfish)
