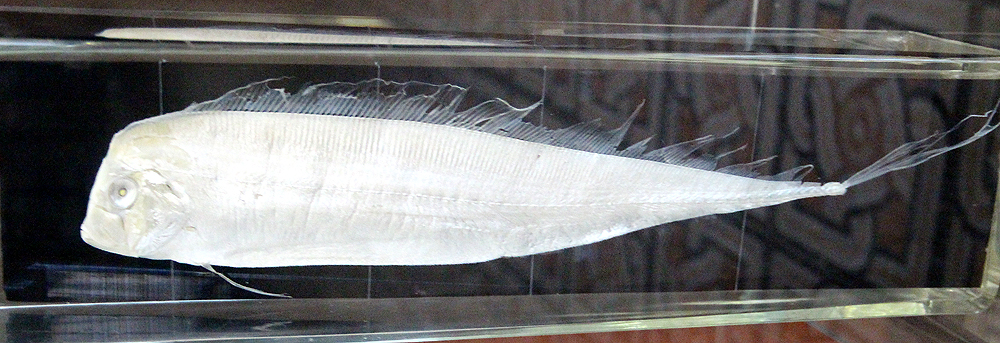
- Mediterranean dealfish (Trachipterus trachypterus)

Scientific classification
- Domain: Eukaryota
- Kingdom: Animalia
- Phylum: Chordata
- Class: Actinopterygii
- Order: Lampriformes
- Family: Trachipteridae
- Genus: Trachipterus; Gouan, 1770

= Trachipterus =

Trachipterus Temporal range: Late Miocene to present

Genus of fishes

Trachipterus is a genus of ribbonfishes.

== Species ==
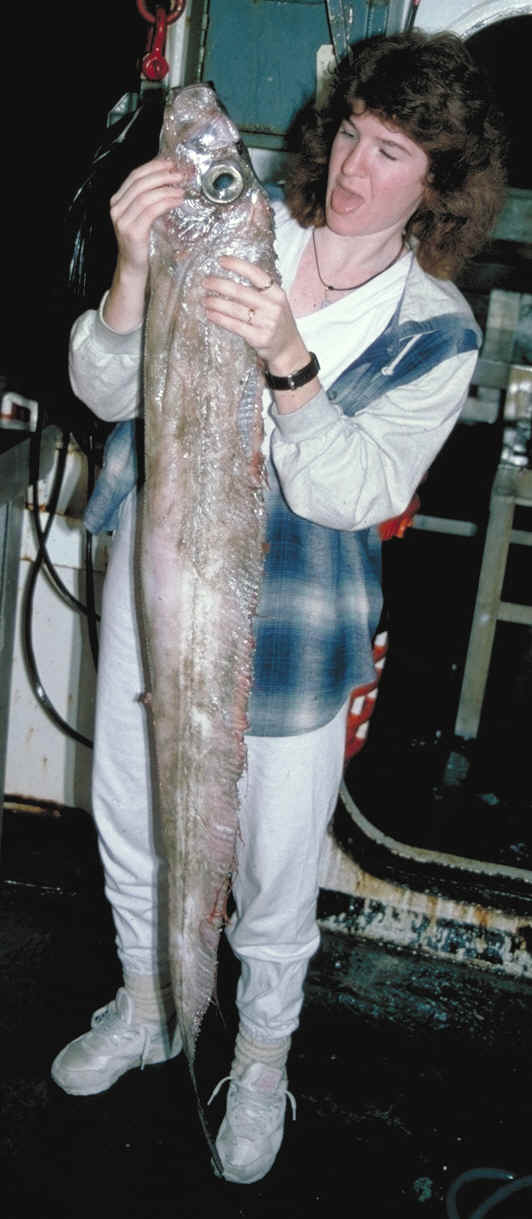
King-of-the-salmon (T. altivelis)

There are currently six recognized species in this genus:

- Trachipterus altivelis Kner, 1859 (King-of-the-salmon)
- Trachipterus arcticus (Brünnich, 1771) (Dealfish)
- Trachipterus fukuzakii Fitch, 1964 (Tapertail ribbonfish)
- Trachipterus ishikawae D. S. Jordan & Snyder, 1901 (Slender ribbonfish)
- Trachipterus jacksonensis (E. P. Ramsay, 1881) (Blackflash ribbonfish)
- Trachipterus trachypterus (J. F. Gmelin, 1789) (Mediterranean dealfish)

The only known fossil species is Trachipterus mauritanicus Carnevale, 2004 from the latest Miocene (Messinian) of Algeria.
