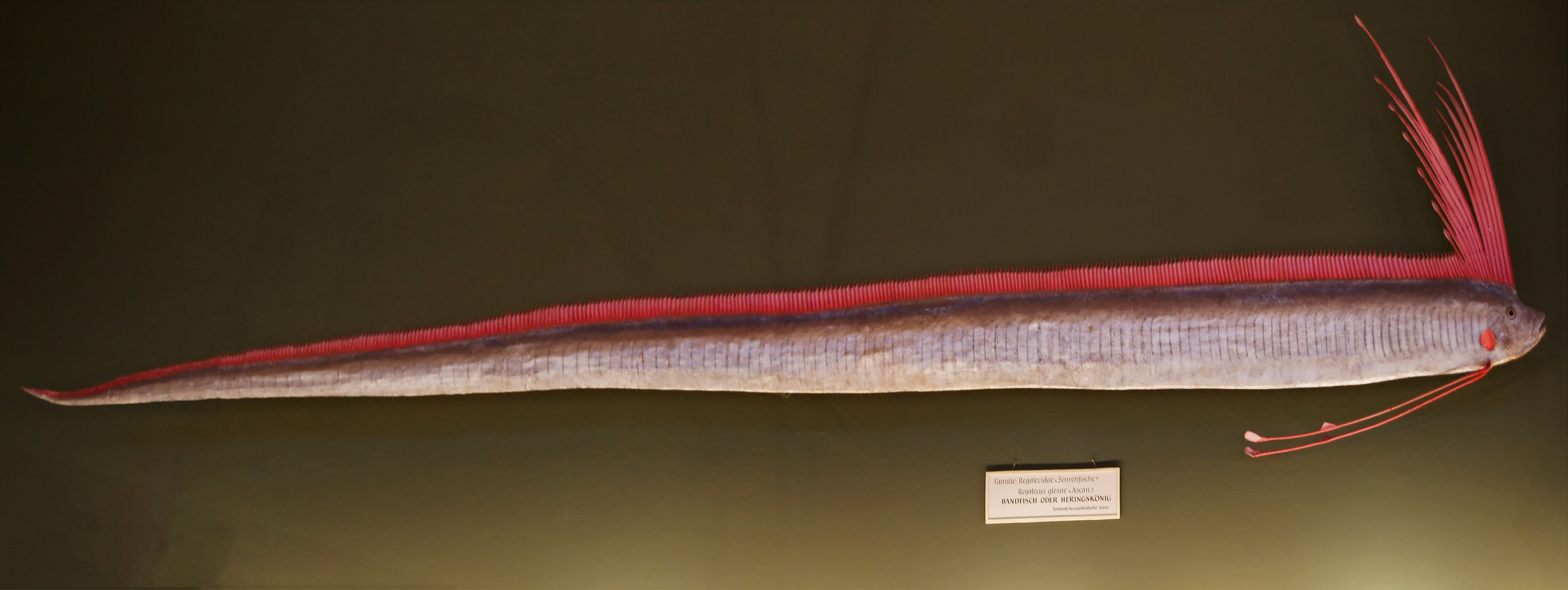
- A taxidermied specimen of Regalecus glesne in Naturhistorisches Museum Wien

Conservation status
- Least Concern (IUCN 3.1)

Scientific classification
- Kingdom: Animalia
- Phylum: Chordata
- Class: Actinopterygii
- Order: Lampriformes
- Family: Regalecidae
- Genus: Regalecus
- Species: R. glesne

Binomial name
- Regalecus glesne Ascanius, 1772

Synonyms
- Synonyms: Cephalepis octomaculatus Rafinesque, 1810; Cepola gladius Walbaum, 1792; Gymnetrus ascanii Shaw, 1803; Gymnetrus banksii Valenciennes, 1835; Gymnetrus capensis Valenciennes, 1835; Gymnetrus gladius Valenciennes, 1835; Gymnetrus grillii Lindroth, 1798; Gymnetrus hawkenii Bloch, 1795; Gymnetrus longiradiatus Risso, 1820; Gymnetrus telum Valenciennes, 1835; Regalecus banksii (Valenciennes, 1835); Regalecus caudatus Zugmayer, 1914; Regalecus jonesii Newman, 1860; Regalecus masterii De Vis, 1891; Regalecus pacificus Haast, 1878; Regalecus remipes Brünnich, 1788

= Giant oarfish =

Species of oceanic ray-finned fish

The giant oarfish (Regalecus glesne) is a species of oarfish of the family Regalecidae. It is an oceanodromous species with a worldwide distribution, excluding polar regions. Other common names include Pacific oarfish, king of herrings, and ribbonfish.

R. glesne is the world's longest ray-finned fish. Its shape is ribbon-like, narrow laterally, with a dorsal fin along its entire length, stubby pectoral fins, and long, oar-shaped pelvic fins, from which its common name is derived. Its coloration is silver and blue with spots of dark pigmentation, and its fins are crimson. Its physical characteristics and undulating mode of swimming have led to speculation that it might be the source of many "sea serpent" sightings. In 2016, the TV show River Monsters concluded that the most likely origin of the sea serpent myth is the oarfish; host Jeremy Wade was filmed diving with two living, healthy giant oarfish in the Mediterranean Sea.

== Taxonomy ==
R. glesne was first described by Peter Ascanius in 1772. The genus name, Regalecus (from Latin 'regalis' meaning royal), signifies "belonging to a king"; the specific epithet glesne is from "Glesnaes", the name of a farm at Glesvær (not far from Norway's second largest city of Bergen), where the type specimen was found.

Its "king of herrings" nickname may derive from its crownlike appendages and from being sighted near shoals of herring, which fishermen thought were being guided by this fish. Its common name, oarfish, is probably an allusion to the shape of its pelvic fins, or else it may refer to the long slender shape of the fish itself.

== Distribution ==
The giant oarfish has a worldwide distribution, having been found as far north as 72°N and as far south as 52°S, but is most commonly found in the tropics to middle latitudes, 180°W to 180°E. It has been categorized as oceanodromous, following its primary food source. It can be found in both the Atlantic and Pacific Oceans, though it is more widely distributed in the Atlantic. The fish is thought to be cosmopolitan in distribution, though it is not found in the polar regions. It is thought to inhabit the sunlit epipelagic to dimly lit mesopelagic zones. The deepest verified account of R. glesne is 463–492 metres (1,519–1,614 ft) from the Gulf of Mexico, as part of the Gulf SERPENT project.

== Description ==
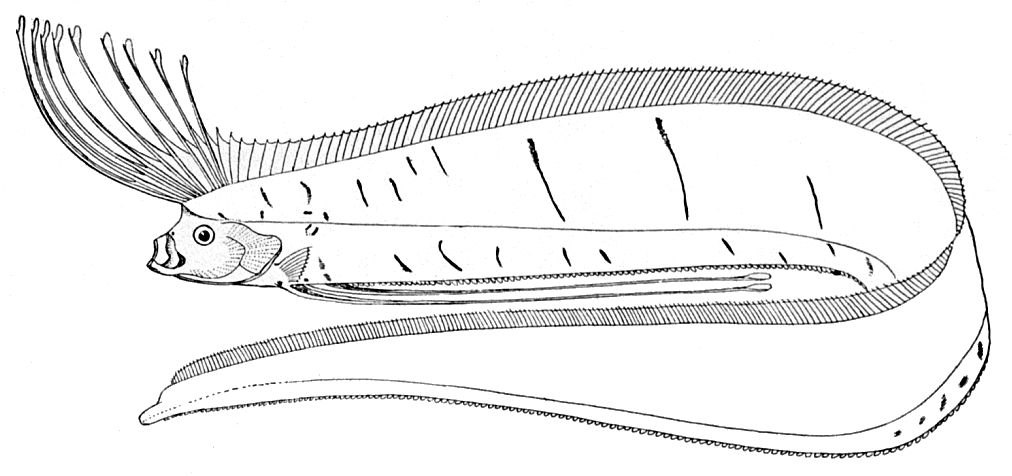
1895 illustration of Regalecus glesne

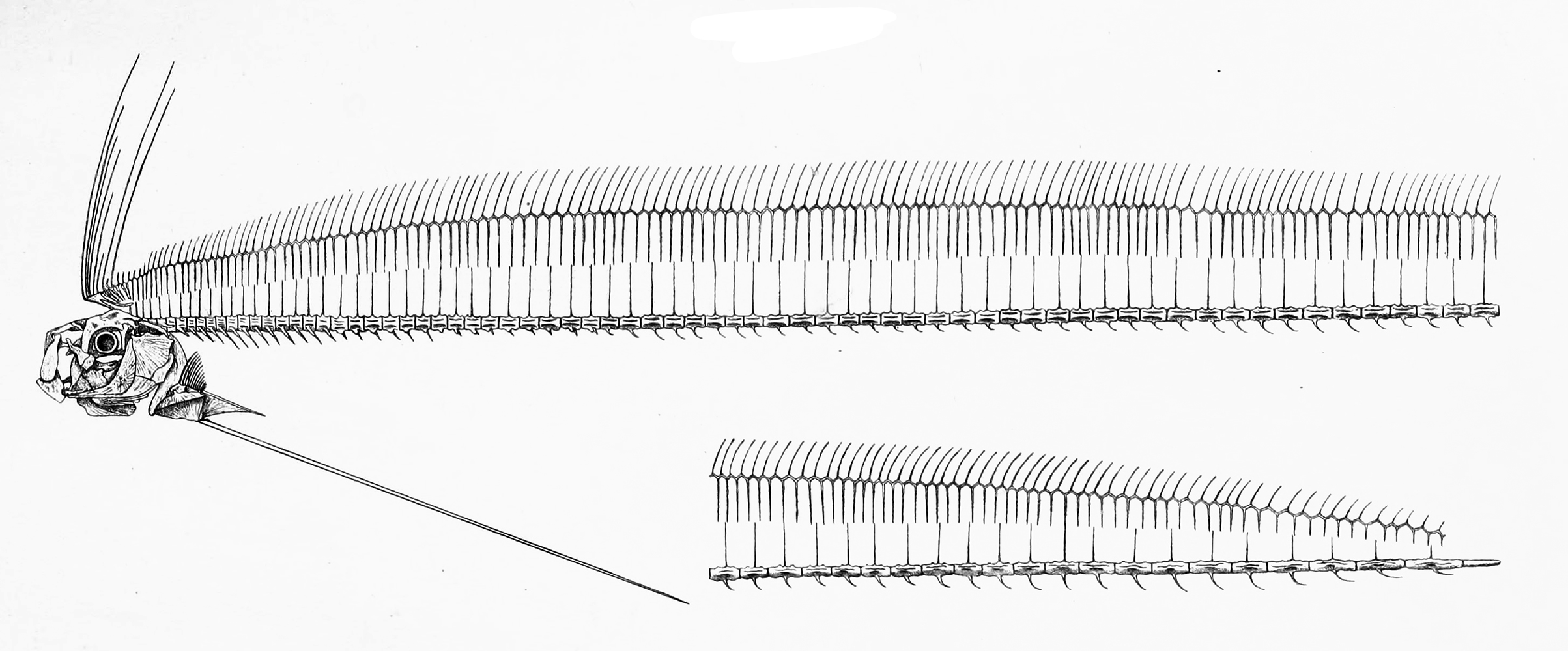
Skeleton

This species is the world's longest bony fish, reaching a record length of about 7–8 metres (23–26 ft), possibly up to 11 metres (36 ft), and a maximum record weight of 272 kilograms (600 lb). Older, much longer estimates, such as a believed to be 17 metres (56 ft) long, are now considered "very likely inaccurate." It is commonly measured to 3 m (9.8 ft) in total length.

Few R. glesne larvae have been identified and described in situ. These larvae exhibit an elongated body with rays extending from the occipital crest and a long pelvic fin, identical to that of the adult fish. Unlike the adult form of the species, the skin of the larvae is almost entirely transparent with intermittent spots of dark coloration along the organism's dorsum and head. This dark pigmentation is presumably an adaptation developed for counter-shading when the adult fish is vertical in the water column. Additionally, the larvae possess a caudal fin with four fin rays, which is a trait not present in the adult form of the species. In some larger juvenile specimens, body coloration similar to that of the adult form was observed. Observations of larvae specimen of Regalecus glesne captured off the island coast of Palagruža analyzed the size of these specimens. The larvae specimen was measured to be 103.4 millimetres (4.07 in) with a body height of around 7 millimetres (0.28 in).

Adults have a pale silver ribbonlike body shape that is laterally compressed and extremely elongated with a dorsal fin along its entire length from between its eyes to the tip of its tail, ranging in color from faint pinkish to a bright red. The body often has dark wavy markings resembling spots or stripes. There is a black coloration of the membrane between the opercle and the other head bones. A series of faint horizontal stripes is evident in some specimens, while absent in others. The skin is scaleless, with extensive tuberculation.

The dorsal fin rays are soft and number between 414 and 449 in total. At the head of the fish, the first 10–12 of these dorsal fin rays are lengthened, forming the distinctive red crest associated with the species. Its pectoral and pelvic fins are nearly adjacent. The pectoral fins are stubby while the pelvic fins are long, single-rayed, and reminiscent of an oar in shape, widening at the tip. There are no anal fins. The caudal fin is usually under 2 m (6.6 ft) in length, with most well under 1 m (3.3 ft) and has four rays. In most specimens, the caudal fins are badly broken or absent entirely. Its head is small with the protrusible jaw typical of lampriformes. The species has 33 to 47 gill rakers on the first gill arch, no teeth, and the inside of the mouth is black. It has a pair of large eyes just above the mouth.

The organs of the giant oarfish are concentrated toward the head end of the body, possibly enabling it to survive losing large portions of its tail. It has no swim bladder. The liver of R. glesne is orange or red, the likely result of astaxanthin in its diet. The lateral line begins above and behind the eye then, descending to the lower third of the body and extending to the caudal tip. There is a postabdominal gastric caecum, a tube which extends from the end of the stomach to the end of the body. The function of this structure is unknown, as no food items have been observed within it. It is not necessary for vital functions, as Regalecus have lost half or all of the caecum and survived without it.

R. glesne may be confused with the Russell's Oarfish or R. russelii. The two can be distinguished by the number of rays in the second dorsal fin crest (11 in R. glesne and one in R. russellii). R. glesne also has a smaller snout-vent length, about one-fourth of the standard body length, whereas R. russellii has a larger snout-vent length, about one-third of the standard body length. R. glense has a longer abdomen than R. russellii. R. russellii has more gill rakers (47–60), and a single dorsal fin crest with a single ray, whereas R. glesne has fewer gill rakers (33–47) and second dorsal fin crest with 5–11 rays. There are also a difference in the number of pre-anus dorsal fin rays, with R. russellii having less than 82 and R. glesne over 90.

== Life cycle ==
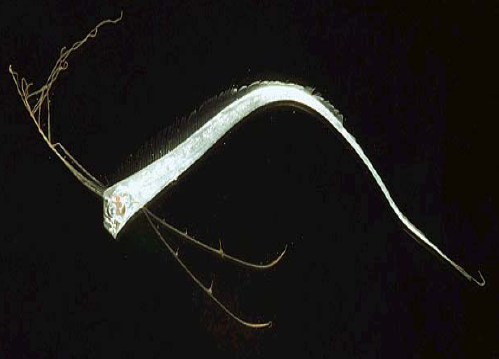
R. glesne juvenile

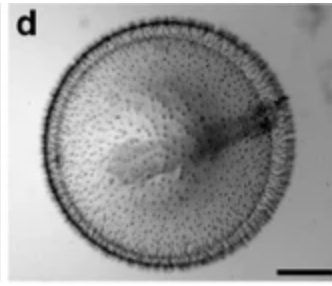
Image of R. glesne egg.

The only reliable record of the early stages of Regalecus is a report of eggs from the western Pacific, identified using DNA barcoding techniques, and a juvenile 13.7 millimetres (0.54 in) (in standard length) identified from developed morphological features. R. glesne eggs are observed to be circular in shape, with numerous short spines (approximately 0.04 mm (0.0016 in)) that were uniformly scattered all over the chorion.

== Behavior ==
Little is known about oarfish behavior. It has been observed swimming by means of undulating its dorsal fin, and also swimming in a vertical position using undulatory movements of both its body and dorsal fin. In 2010, scientists filmed a giant oarfish in the Gulf of Mexico swimming in the mesopelagic layer, the first footage of a reliably identified R. glesne in its natural setting. The footage was caught during a survey, using an ROV in the vicinity of Thunder Horse PDQ, and shows the fish swimming in a columnar orientation, tail downward.

A 2016 episode of TV show River Monsters filmed two oarfish, most likely R. glesne, swimming in deep water in the middle of the Mediterranean Sea, off the coast of France. In season 8 episode 1, titled "Deep Sea Demon" (the 47th episode of the series), River Monsters host Jeremy Wade and his crew went to a specific buoy, anchored to the seabed by a single vertical chain, where previous sightings of an oarfish had been reported. At the buoy, the water is approximately 2.4 km (1.5 mi) deep. The rarely-sighted oarfish was reported to occasionally swim up and down the chain, sometimes as close as 9.1 m (30 ft) from the surface. During Wade's second diving attempt, done around nightfall, he successfully saw first one, then two living and healthy oarfish. Wade estimated the first oarfish was roughly 2.5 times Wade's height; unofficial reports list Wade's height as 1.83 m (6.0 ft) tall, meaning the oarfish was roughly 4.57 m (15.0 ft) long. The first oarfish seemed mildly curious but unafraid of Wade; it came close enough that Wade was able to reach out and gently touch it, to which the oarfish barely reacted. A little after this, the second oarfish swam up to Wade, leaving him diving in the water with two extremely rare fish. It is unknown exactly why the oarfish were there, whether they came to that location to feed, or whether or not they were a breeding pair. Both oarfish appeared to be using the buoy's chain as a point of reference in the sea. The oarfish were filmed swimming both vertically and horizontally (in reference to the vertical chain) while undulating their dorsal fins. Wade commented on how graceful and fast both oarfish were in the water. When resting next to the chain, both oarfish seemed to prefer being vertical, with their tails downward. After a while, both oarfish swam away unharmed.

== Feeding ==
There is little known about the feeding habits of Regalecus. Most accounts report the stomach and gut as empty, or with colored liquid inside. There is one account of R. glesne with a gut content of thousands of krill. Another report of the stomach contents of two adult R. glesne consisted of 43 heads and 7 individuals of Mediterranean krill.

== Growth ==
The number of crests in R. glesne increases as the fish grows. Juveniles begin with a single dorsal fin ray. After the larvae grows to about 50 mm (2.0 in), the rays following the first ray grow increasingly ornate and elongate.

== Parasites ==
There are few noted parasitoids of Regalecidae. An adult female R. glesne was found to be host to at least 63 plerocercoids (the infective larvae of tapeworms) consistent with the characteristics of the larvae of the genus Clistobothrium.

== Self-amputation ==
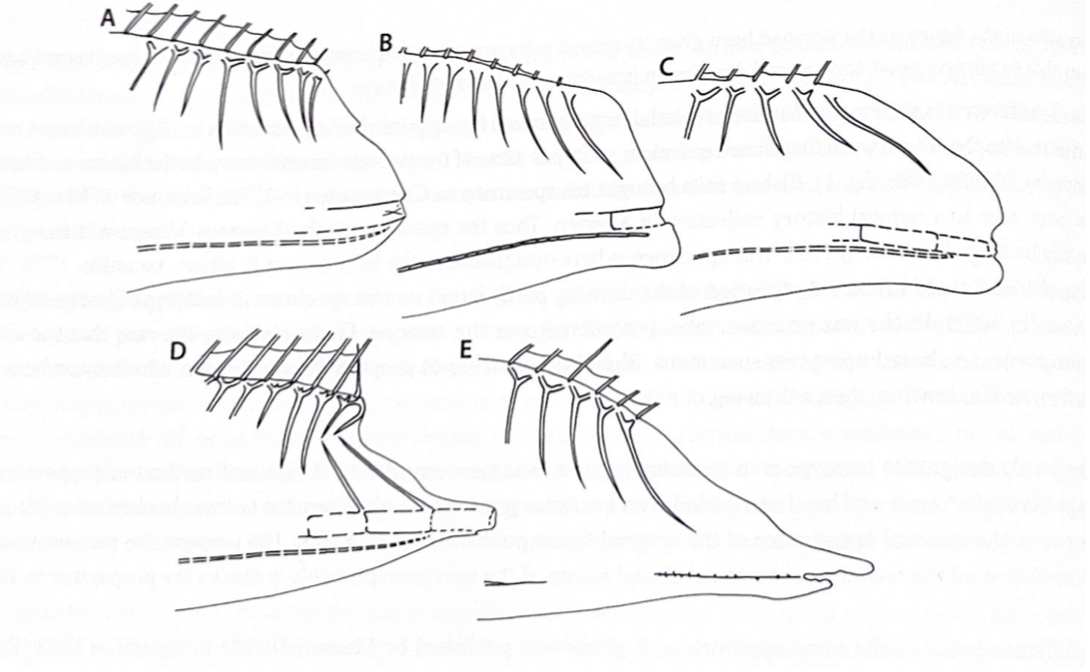
Tail end of R. glesne showing evidence of self-amputation.

R. glesne shows evidence of self-amputation of the body posterior to the vent. This amputation can either be just involving the caudal fin and a small number of vertebrae, or it may be the entire posterior part of the body. As the organs of R. glesne are concentrated in the front portion of the body, these amputations do not damage any vital organs. These amputations are noted to occur several times throughout the lifetime of the fish (serial autotomy), and all fish over 1.5 m (4.9 ft) long have bodies shortened by this. It is unclear why these amputations occur, as oarfish have no documented natural predators, so it is unlikely to be a predation response. Despite a common misconception that oarfish are preyed on by sharks, no shark attacks on oarfish have been documented. There is one recorded instance of a pod of pilot whales attacking an oarfish, but they did not eat it.

== Population size ==
There have been no documented attempts to quantify the population size of R. glesne. There is at least one population in the Northern Atlantic, and an isolated reproductive population in the Mediterranean. Very early life stages have been found near the Gulf Coast of Florida and off the coast of Canada. Eggs have been found in the waters of New Zealand and near the West Mariana ridge in the western North Pacific. The species is listed as "Least Concern" on the IUCN Red List.

== Fossil record ==
The only known fossil of Regalecus glesne comes from a Late Pliocene deposit near Macerata, Marche, Italy (found at 43°14'36''N, 13°25'32''E). Specifically, the fossil in question, identified as R. glesne, consists of the 355 mm (14.0 in)-long posterior portion of the body and what have been identified as the single-rayed pelvic fins of the same specimen.

== Relationship with humans ==
R. glesne is not fished commercially, but it is an occasional bycatch in commercial nets. When cooked, the taste of an oarfish is described as "like paper." R. glesne was offered to a dog who regularly consumes fish, and was refused. Six people agreed to try fried oarfish and said that the taste was suitable, but the flesh was extremely flaccid, and overall objectionable.

The Egyptian deity Ḥȝyšš, of which 16 depictions are known, is described as a horse-headed snake god and found on coffins and sarcophagi. It has been proposed that this is a depiction of R. glesne, based on the similarity of the elongated fins and coloration.

The giant oarfish, and the related R. russelii, are sometimes known as "earthquake fish" because they are popularly believed to surface before and after an earthquake, although such correlation is not supported.

Due to their size, elongated bodies, and undulating swimming pattern, giant oarfish are presumed to be responsible for some sea serpent sightings. A 2016 episode of the TV series River Monsters, seeking to uncover the origin of the sea serpent myth, concluded that the most likely culprit was the oarfish. Formerly considered rare, the species is now suspected to be relatively common, although sightings of healthy specimens in their natural habitat are unusual.
