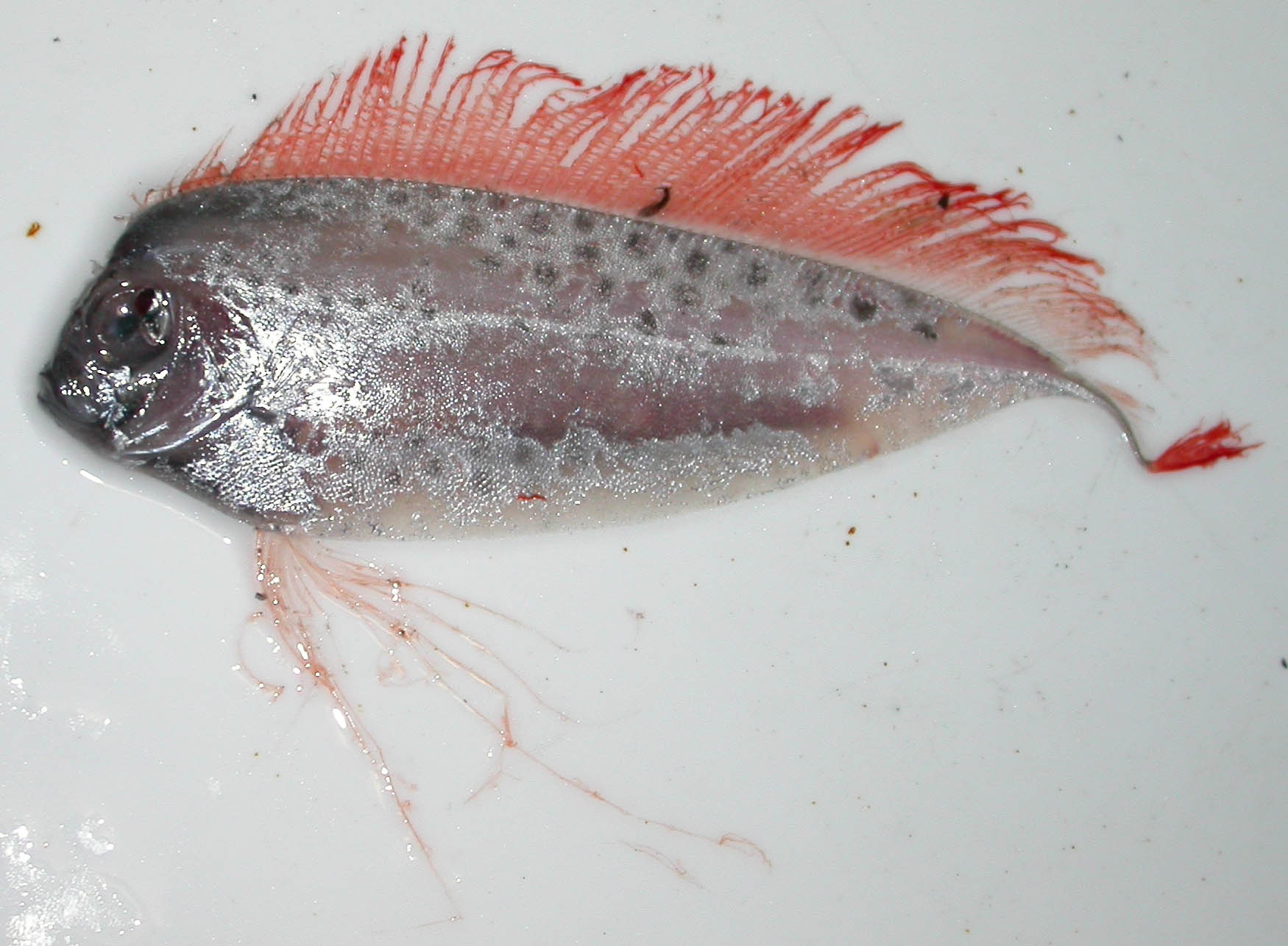
- Desmodema polystictum

Scientific classification
- Kingdom: Animalia
- Phylum: Chordata
- Class: Actinopterygii
- Order: Lampriformes
- Suborder: Taeniosomi
- Family: Trachipteridae; Swainson, 1839

Genera
- Desmodema; Trachipterus; Zu

= Ribbonfish =

Ribbonfish Temporal range: Late Miocene–present

Family of fishes

The ribbonfish are any lampriform fishes in the family Trachipteridae. There are about 10 recognized species in the family. These pelagic fish are named for their slim, ribbon-like appearance. They are rarely seen alive, as they typically live in deep waters, though are not bottom feeders. The perciform fish known as the red bandfish (Cepola macrophthalma) is sometimes referred to as ribbonfish, but it is unrelated to any ribbonfish in the Trachipteridae.

They are readily recognized by their anatomy — a long, compressed, tape-like body, short head, narrow mouth and feeble teeth. A high dorsal fin occupies the whole length of the back; an anal fin is absent, and the caudal fin, if present, consists of two fascicles of rays of which the upper is prolonged and directed upwards. The pectoral fins are small, the pelvic fins composed of several rays, or of one long ray only. They have heavy spines along their lateral lines, and numerous lumps in the skin. Ribbonfish possess all the characteristics of fish living at very great depths. Their fins especially, and the membrane connecting them, are of a very delicate and brittle structure. In young ribbonfish, some of the fin-rays are prolonged to an extraordinary degree, and sometimes provided with appendages.

Specimens have been taken in the Atlantic, the Mediterranean, the Bay of Bengal, at Mauritius, and in the Pacific. The species from the Atlantic has occurred chiefly on the northern coasts, Iceland, Scandinavia, Orkney, and Scotland. The north Atlantic species is known in English as deal fish, in Icelandic as vogmær and in Swedish as vågmär. Its length is usually 5 to 8 ft (1.5–3.5 m), but it can sometimes be found at over 20 ft. Specimens seem usually to be driven to the shore by gales in winter, and are sometimes left by the tide. S. Nilsson, however, in Scandinavia observed a living specimen in two or three fathoms (4–5 m) of water moving something like a flatfish with one side turned obliquely upwards. A specimen of Trachipterus ishikawae was discovered on a beach in Kenting, Taiwan, in November 2007, alive but with a 10-cm cut wound to its side, and was returned to deeper water.

The species Trachipterus ishikawae is commonly called "earthquake fish" in Taiwan because the fish are popularly believed to appear following major earthquake events due to alleged sensitivity to disturbances in the ocean floor. Records of such appearances were made following a 100-year earthquake in Hengchun in late 2006 and in Taitung in 2007, as well as the numerous March 2011 sightings along the coast of Japan, but other recorded sightings do not correspond with seismic disturbances.
