= List of fishes of the North Sea =

List of fish of the North Sea consists of 201 species, both indigenous, and also introduced, listed in systematic index. It includes 40 species of Chondrichthyes, three species of Agnatha, the others being bony fishes.

The following tags are used to indicate the conservation status of species by IUCN's criteria:

EX	Extinct
CR	Critically endangered
EN	Endangered
VU	Vulnerable
NT	Near threatened
LC	Least concern
DD	Data deficient
NE	Not evaluated

All the listed species are classified by their origin as native, introduced, invasive, and species found accidentally (difficult to characterize as native or invasive).

== List ==
Scientific name	Taxa authority	English name	Origin	IUCN status	Image
Ordo: Myxiniformes
Family: Myxinidae
Myxine glutinosa	Linnaeus, 1758	Atlantic hagfish	Native	Least concern	
Ordo: Petromyzontiformes
Family: Petromyzontidae
Lampetra fluviatilis	(Linnaeus, 1758)	European river lamprey	Native	Least concern	
Petromyzon marinus	Linnaeus, 1758	Sea lamprey	Native	Least concern	
Ordo: Chimaeriformes
Family: Chimaeridae
Chimaera monstrosa	Linnaeus, 1758	Rabbit fish	Native	Near threatened	
Ordo: Squaliformes
Family: Somniosidae
Centroscymnus coelolepis	(du Bocage & Capello, 1864)	Portuguese dogfish	Native	Near threatened	
Centroselachus crepidater	(du Bocage & Capello, 1864)	Longnose velvet dogfish	Native	Least concern	
Somniosus microcephalus	Bloch & Schneider, 1801	Greenland shark	Native	Near threatened	
Family: Centrophoridae
Centrophorus squamosus	(Bonnaterre, 1788)	Leafscale gulper shark	Native	Vulnerable	
Deania calcea	(Lowe, 1839)	Birdbeak dogfish	Native	Least concern	
Family: Dalatiidae
Dalatias licha	(Bonnaterre, 1788)	Kitefin shark	Native	Near threatened	
Family: Echinorhinidae
Echinorhinus brucus	(Bonnaterre, 1788)	Bramble shark	Native	Data deficient	
Family: Etmopteridae
Etmopterus princeps	(Collett, 1904)	Great lanternshark	Native	Data deficient	
Etmopterus spinax	(Linnaeus, 1758)	Velvet belly lanternshark	Native	Least concern	
Family: Squalidae
Squalus acanthias	Linnaeus, 1758	Spiny dogfish	Native	Vulnerable	
Ordo: Squatiniformes
Family: Squatinidae
Squatina squatina	(Linnaeus, 1758)	Angelshark	Native	Critically endangered	
Ordo: Hexanchiformes
Family: Hexanchidae
Hexanchus griseus	(Bonnaterre, 1788)	Bluntnose sixgill shark	Native	Near threatened	
Ordo: Lamniformes
Family: Alopiidae
Alopias vulpinus	(Bonnaterre, 1788)	Common thresher	Native	Vulnerable	
Family: Cetorhinidae
Cetorhinus maximus	(Gunnerus, 1765)	Basking shark	Native	Vulnerable	
Family: Lamnidae
Lamna nasus	(Bonnaterre, 1788)	Porbeagle	Native	Vulnerable	
Ordo: Carcharhiniformes
Family: Carcharhinidae
Galeorhinus galeus	(Linnaeus, 1758)	School shark	Native	Vulnerable	
Prionace glauca	(Linnaeus, 1758)	Blue shark	Native	Near threatened	
Family: Triakidae
Mustelus asterias	Cloquet, 1821	Starry smooth-hound	Native	Least concern	
Family: Scyliorhinidae
Galeus melastomus	Rafinesque, 1810	Blackmouth catshark	Native	Least concern	
Scyliorhinus canicula	(Linnaeus, 1758)	Small-spotted catshark	Native	Least concern	
Scyliorhinus stellaris	(Linnaeus, 1758)	Nursehound	Native	Near threatened	
Ordo: Torpediniformes
Family: Torpedinidae
Torpedo marmorata	Risso, 1810	Marbled electric ray	Native	Data deficient	
Torpedo nobiliana	Bonaparte, 1835	Atlantic torpedo	Native	Data deficient	
Ordo: Rajiformes
Family: Rajidae
Amblyraja radiata	(Donovan, 1808)	Thorny skate	Native	Vulnerable	
Dipturus batis	(Linnaeus, 1758)	Common skate	Native	Critically endangered	
Dipturus linteus	(Fries, 1838)	Sailray	Native	Least concern	
Dipturus nidarosiensis	(Storm, 1881)	Norwegian skate	Native	Near threatened	
Dipturus oxyrinchus	(Linnaeus, 1758)	Longnosed skate	Native	Near threatened	
Leucoraja circularis	(Couch, 1838)	Sandy ray	Native	Vulnerable	
Leucoraja fullonica	(Linnaeus, 1758)	Shagreen ray	Native	Near threatened	
Leucoraja naevus	(Müller & Henle, 1841)	Cuckoo ray	Native	Least concern	
Raja brachyura	Lafont, 1871	Blonde ray	Native	Near threatened	
Raja clavata	Linnaeus, 1758	Thornback ray	Native	Near threatened	
Raja montagui	(Fowler, 1910)	Spotted ray	Native	Least concern	
Rajella fyllae	(Lütken, 1887)	Round ray	Native	Least concern	
Ordo: Myliobatiformes
Family: Dasyatidae
Dasyatis pastinaca	(Linnaeus, 1758)	Common stingray	Native	Data deficient	
Pteroplatytrygon violacea	(Bonaparte, 1832)	Pelagic stingray	Native	Least concern	
Myliobatis aquila	(Linnaeus, 1758)	Common eagle ray	Native	Data deficient	
Ordo: Acipenseriformes
Family: Acipenseridae
Acipenser sturio	Linnaeus, 1758	European sea sturgeon	Native	Critically endangered	
Ordo: Anguilliformes
Family: Anguillidae
Anguilla anguilla	(Linnaeus, 1758)	European eel	Native	Critically endangered	
Conger conger	(Linnaeus, 1758)	European conger	Native	Not evaluated	
Nemichthys scolopaceus	Richardson, 1848	Slender snipe eel	Native	Not evaluated	
Ordo: Clupeiformes
Family: Clupeidae
Alosa alosa	(Linnaeus, 1758)	Allis shad	Native	Least concern	
Alosa fallax	Lacépède, 1800	Twait shad	Native	Least concern	
Clupea harengus	Linnaeus, 1758	Atlantic herring	Native	Least concern	
Engraulis encrasicolus	(Linnaeus, 1758)	European anchovy	Native	Not evaluated	
Sardina pilchardus	(Walbaum, 1792)	European pilchard	Native	Not evaluated	
Sprattus sprattus	(Linnaeus, 1758)	European sprat	Native	Not evaluated	
Ordo: Argentiniformes
Family: Argentinidae
Argentina silus	(Ascanius, 1775)	Greater argentine	Native	Not evaluated	
Argentina sphyraena	Linnaeus, 1758	Argentine	Native	Not evaluated	
Ordo: Salmoniformes
Family: Salmonidae
Coregonus oxyrinchus	(Linnaeus, 1758)	Houting	Native	Vulnerable	
Salmo salar	Linnaeus, 1758	Atlantic salmon	Native	Least concern	
Salmo trutta	Linnaeus, 1758	Brown trout	Native	Least concern	
Salvelinus alpinus	(Linnaeus, 1758)	Arctic char	Native	Least concern	
Ordo: Osmeriformes
Family: Osmeridae
Osmerus eperlanus	(Linnaeus, 1758)	European smelt	Native	Least concern	
Ordo: Ophidiiformes
Family: Carapidae
Echiodon drummondii	Thompson, 1837	Drummond's pearlfish	Native	Least concern	
Ordo: Stomiiformes
Family: Sternoptychidae
Argyropelecus olfersii	(Cuvier, 1829)	Silver hatchetfish	Native	Not evaluated	
Maurolicus muelleri	(Gmelin, 1789)	Mueller's pearlside	Native	Not evaluated	
Ordo: Aulopiformes
Family: Paralepididae
Arctozenus risso	(Bonaparte, 1840)	Spotted barracudina	Accidental	Not evaluated	
Paralepis coregonoides	Risso, 1820	Sharpchin barracudina	Native	Not evaluated	
Ordo: Myctophiformes
Family: Myctophidae
Benthosema glaciale	(Reinhardt, 1837)	Glacier lantern fish	Accidental	Not evaluated	
Myctophum punctatum	Rafinesque, 1810	Spotted lanternfish	Native	Not evaluated	
Ordo: Gadiformes
Family: Gadidae
Gadiculus thori	Schmidt, 1913	Silvery pout	Native	Not evaluated	
Gadus morhua	Linnaeus, 1758	Atlantic cod	Native	Vulnerable	
Melanogrammus aeglefinus	(Linnaeus, 1758)	Haddock	Native	Vulnerable	
Merlangius merlangus	(Linnaeus, 1758)	Whiting	Native	Not evaluated	
Micromesistius poutassou	(Risso, 1827)	Blue whiting	Native	Not evaluated	
Pollachius pollachius	(Linnaeus, 1758)	Pollack	Native	Not evaluated	
Pollachius virens	(Linnaeus, 1758)	Coalfish	Native	Not evaluated	
Raniceps raninus	(Linnaeus, 1758)	Tadpole fish	Native	Not evaluated	
Trisopterus esmarkii	Nilsson, 1855	Norway pout	Native	Not evaluated	
Trisopterus luscus	(Linnaeus, 1758)	Pouting	Native	Not evaluated	
Trisopterus minutus	(Linnaeus, 1758)	Poor cod	Native	Least concern	
Family: Lotidae
Brosme brosme	(Ascanius, 1772)	Cusk	Native	Not evaluated	
Ciliata mustela	(Linnaeus, 1758)	Fivebeard rockling	Native	Not evaluated	
Ciliata septentrionalis	(Collett, 1875)	Northern rockling	Native	Not evaluated	
Enchelyopus cimbrius	(Linnaeus, 1766)	Fourbeard rockling	Native	Not evaluated	
Gaidropsarus mediterraneus	(Linnaeus, 1758)	Shore rockling	Native	Not evaluated	
Gaidropsarus vulgaris	(Cloquet, 1824)	Three-bearded rockling	Native	Not evaluated	
Molva dypterygia	(Pennant, 1784)	Blue ling	Native	Not evaluated	
Molva molva	(Linnaeus, 1758)	Common ling	Native	Not evaluated	
Coryphaenoides rupestris	Gunnerus, 1765	Roundnose grenadier	Native	Not evaluated	
Family: Merlucciidae
Merluccius merluccius	(Linnaeus, 1758)	European hake	Native	Not evaluated	
Family: Phycidae
Phycis blennoides	(Brünnich, 1768)	Greater forkbeard	Native	Not evaluated	
Ordo: Lampriformes
Family: Lampridae
Lampris guttatus	(Brünnich, 1788)	Opah	Native	Not evaluated	
Family: Regalecidae
Regalecus glesne	Ascanius, 1772	Giant oarfish	Native	Not evaluated	
Family: Trachipteridae
Trachipterus arcticus	(Brünnich, 1788)	Dealfish	Accidental	Not evaluated	
Ordo: Lophiiformes
Family: Lophiidae
Lophius budegassa	Spinola, 1807	Blackbellied angler	Native	Not evaluated	
Lophius piscatorius	Linnaeus, 1758	Sea-devil	Native	Not evaluated	
Ordo: Atheriniformes
Family: Atherinidae
Atherina boyeri	Risso, 1810	Big-scale sand smelt	Invasive	Least concern	
Atherina presbyter	Cuvier, 1829	Sand smelt	Native	Not evaluated	
Ordo: Beloniformes
Family: Belonidae
Belone belone	(Linnaeus, 1761)	Garfish	Native	Not evaluated	
Family: Scomberesocidae
Scomberesox saurus	(Walbaum, 1792)	Atlantic saury	Native	Not evaluated	
Family: Exocoetidae
Cheilopogon heterurus	(Rafinesque, 1810)	Mediterranean flyingfish	Native	Not evaluated	
Ordo: Gasterosteiformes
Family: Gasterosteidae
Gasterosteus aculeatus	(Linnaeus, 1758)	Three-spined stickleback	Native	Least concern	
Spinachia spinachia	(Linnaeus, 1758)	Fifteenspine stickleback	Native	Not evaluated	
Ordo: Syngnathiformes
Family: Centriscidae
Macroramphosus scolopax	(Linnaeus, 1758)	Longspine snipefish	Native	Least concern	
Family: Syngnathidae
Entelurus aequoreus	(Linnaeus, 1758)	Snake pipefish	Native	Not evaluated	
Nerophis lumbriciformis	(Jenyns, 1835)	Worm pipefish	Native	Not evaluated	
Nerophis ophidion	(Linnaeus, 1758)	Straightnose pipefish	Native	Not evaluated	
Syngnathus acus	Linnaeus, 1758	Greater pipefish	Native	Not evaluated	
Syngnathus rostellatus	Nilsson, 1855	Lesser pipefish	Native	Not evaluated	
Syngnathus typhle	Linnaeus, 1758	Broadnosed pipefish	Native	Not evaluated	
Hippocampus hippocampus	(Linnaeus, 1758)	Short-snouted seahorse	Native	Data deficient	
Ordo: Cypriniformes
Family: Cyprinidae
Aspius aspius	Linnaeus, 1758	Asp	Accidental	Not evaluated	
Ordo: Scorpaeniformes
Family: Agonidae
Agonus cataphractus	(Linnaeus, 1758)	Armed bullhead	Native	Not evaluated	
Family: Cottidae
Artediellus atlanticus	Jordan & Evermann, 1898	Atlantic hookear sculpin	Native	Least concern	
Icelus bicornis	(Reinhardt, 1840)	Twohorn sculpin	Native	Not evaluated	
Taurulus bubalis	(Euphrasén, 1786)	Longspined sea-scorpion	Native	Not evaluated	
Micrenophrys lilljeborgii	(Collett, 1875)	Norway bullhead	Native	Not evaluated	
Myoxocephalus scorpius	(Linnaeus, 1758)	Shorthorn sculpin	Native	Not evaluated	
Family: Cyclopteridae
Cyclopterus lumpus	Linnaeus, 1758	Lumpsucker	Native	Not evaluated	
Family: Triglidae
Aspitrigla cuculus	(Linnaeus, 1758)	Red gurnard	Native	Not evaluated	
Chelidonichthys lucerna	(Linnaeus, 1758)	Tub gurnard	Native	Not evaluated	
Eutrigla gurnardus	(Linnaeus, 1758)	Grey gurnard	Native	Not evaluated	
Trigla lyra	Linnaeus, 1758	Piper gurnard	Native	Not evaluated	
Trigloporus lastoviza	(Bonnaterre, 1788)	Streaked gurnard	Native	Not evaluated	
Family: Liparidae
Careproctus reinhardti	(Krøyer, 1862)	Sea tadpole	Native	Not evaluated	
Liparis liparis	(Linnaeus, 1766)	Common seasnail	Native	Least concern	
Liparis montagui	(Donovan, 1804)	Montagu's seasnail	Native	Not evaluated	
Family: Sebastidae
Helicolenus dactylopterus	Delaroche, 1809	Blackbelly rosefish	Native	Not evaluated	
Sebastes mentella	Travin, 1951	Deepwater redfish	Native	Least concern	
Sebastes norvegicus	(Ascanius, 1772)	Golden redfish	Native	Not evaluated	
Sebastes viviparus	Krøyer, 1845	Norway redfish	Native	Not evaluated	
Triglops murrayi	Günther, 1888	Moustache sculpin	Native	Not evaluated	
Ordo: Perciformes
Family: Mugilidae
Chelon labrosus	(Risso, 1827)	Thicklip grey mullet	Native	Least concern	
Liza aurata	(Risso, 1810)	Golden grey mullet	Native	Least concern	
Liza ramada	(Risso, 1827)	Thinlip mullet	Native	Least concern	
Family: Bramidae
Brama brama	(Bonnaterre, 1788)	Pomfret	Native	Not evaluated	
Taractes asper	Lowe, 1843	Rough pomfret	Native	Not evaluated	
Pterycombus brama	Fries, 1837	Atlantic fanfish	Native	Not evaluated	
Family: Moronidae
Dicentrarchus labrax	(Linnaeus, 1758)	European seabass	Native	Least concern	
Family: Mullidae
Mullus barbatus	Linnaeus, 1758	Red mullet	Native	Not evaluated	
Mullus surmuletus	Linnaeus, 1758	Striped red mullet	Native	Not evaluated	
Family: Sciaenidae
Argyrosomus regius	(Asso, 1801)	Meagre	Native	Not evaluated	
Family: Sparidae
Boops boops	Linnaeus, 1758	Bogue	Native	Not evaluated	
Dentex maroccanus	Valenciennes, 1830	Morocco dentex	Native	Not evaluated	
Pagellus acarne	(Risso, 1827)	Axillary seabream	Native	Not evaluated	
Pagellus bogaraveo	(Brünnich, 1768)	Blackspot seabream	Native	Not evaluated	
Pagellus erythrinus	(Linnaeus, 1758)	Common pandora	Native	Not evaluated	
Sarpa salpa	(Linnaeus, 1758)	Salema porgy	Native	Not evaluated	
Sparus aurata	(Linnaeus, 1758)	Gilt-head bream	Native	Not evaluated	
Spondyliosoma cantharus	(Linnaeus, 1758)	Black seabream	Native	Not evaluated	
Family: Echeneidae
Remora remora	(Linnaeus, 1758)	Common remora	Native	Not evaluated	
Family: Carangidae
Naucrates ductor	(Linnaeus, 1758)	Pilot fish	Native	Not evaluated	
Trachinotus ovatus	(Linnaeus, 1758)	Pompano	Native	Not evaluated	
Trachurus trachurus	(Linnaeus, 1758)	Atlantic horse mackerel	Native	Not evaluated	
Family: Gobiidae
Aphia minuta	(Risso, 1810)	Transparent goby	Native	Not evaluated	
Buenia jeffreysii	(Günther, 1867)	Jeffrey's goby	Native	Not evaluated	
Crystallogobius linearis	(de Düben, 1845)	Crystal goby	Native	Not evaluated	
Gobius niger	Linnaeus, 1758	Black goby	Native	Not evaluated	
Gobiusculus flavescens	(Fabricius, 1779)	Two-spotted goby	Native	Not evaluated	
Lesueurigobius friesii	(Malm, 1874)	Fries's goby	Native	Not evaluated	
Neogobius melanostomus	(Pallas, 1814)	Round goby	Introduced	Least concern	
Pomatoschistus lozanoi	(F. de Buen, 1923)	Lozano's goby	Native	Not evaluated	
Pomatoschistus microps	(Krøyer, 1838)	Common goby	Native	Least concern	
Pomatoschistus minutus	(Pallas, 1770)	Sand goby	Native	Not evaluated	
Pomatoschistus pictus	(Malm, 1865)	Painted goby	Native	Not evaluated	
Thorogobius ephippiatus	(R. T. Lowe, 1839)	Leopard-spotted goby	Native	Not evaluated	
Family: Blenniidae
Lipophrys pholis	(Linnaeus, 1758)	Shanny	Native	Not evaluated	
Family: Stichaeidae
Chirolophis ascanii	(Walbaum, 1792)	Yarrell's blenny	Native	Not evaluated	
Leptoclinus maculatus	(Fries, 1838)	Daubed shanny	Native	Not evaluated	
Lumpenus lampretaeformis	(Walbaum, 1792)	Snakeblenny	Native	Not evaluated	
Family: Pholidae
Pholis gunnellus	(Linnaeus, 1758)	Rock gunnel	Native	Not evaluated	
Family: Zoarcidae
Lycodes vahlii	Reinhardt, 1831	Vahl's eelpout	Accidental	Not evaluated	
Zoarces viviparus	(Linnaeus, 1758)	Viviparous eelpout	Native	Not evaluated	
Family: Callionymidae
Callionymus lyra	Linnaeus, 1758	Common dragonet	Native	Not evaluated	
Callionymus maculatus	Rafinesque, 1810	Spotted dragonet	Native	Not evaluated	
Callionymus reticulatus	Valenciennes, 1837	Reticulated dragonet	Native	Not evaluated	
Family: Labridae
Centrolabrus exoletus	(Linnaeus, 1758)	Rock cook	Native	Least concern	
Coris julis	(Linnaeus, 1758)	Mediterranean rainbow wrasse	Native	Least concern	
Ctenolabrus rupestris	(Linnaeus, 1758)	Goldsinny wrasse	Native	Least concern	
Labrus bergylta	Ascanius, 1767	Ballan wrasse	Native	Least concern	
Labrus mixtus	Linnaeus, 1758	Cuckoo wrasse	Native	Least concern	
Symphodus melops	(Linnaeus, 1758)	Corkwing wrasse	Native	Least concern	
Family: Scombridae
Euthynnus alletteratus	(Rafinesque, 1810)	Little tunny	Native	Least concern	
Katsuwonus pelamis	(Linnaeus, 1758)	Skipjack tuna	Native	Least concern	
Orcynopsis unicolor	(Geoffroy Saint-Hilaire, 1817)	Plain bonito	Native	Least concern	
Sarda sarda	(Bloch, 1793)	Atlantic bonito	Native	Least concern	
Scomber scombrus	Linnaeus, 1758	Atlantic mackerel	Native	Least concern	
Thunnus thynnus	(Linnaeus, 1758)	Atlantic bluefin tuna	Native	Endangered	
Family: Xiphiidae
Xiphias gladius	Linnaeus, 1758	Swordfish	Native	Least concern	
Family: Ammodytidae
Ammodytes marinus	Raitt, 1934	Raitt's sand eel	Native	Not evaluated	
Ammodytes tobianus	Linnaeus, 1758	Small sandeel	Native	Not evaluated	
Gymnammodytes semisquamatus	(Jourdain, 1879)	Smooth sandeel	Native	Not evaluated	
Hyperoplus immaculatus	(Corbin, 1950)	Greater sand-eel	Native	Not evaluated	
Hyperoplus lanceolatus	(Le Sauvage, 1824)	Great sandeel	Native	Not evaluated	
Family: Anarhichadidae
Anarhichas lupus	Linnaeus, 1758	Atlantic wolffish	Native	Not evaluated	
Family: Trachinidae
Echiichthys vipera	(Cuvier, 1829)	Lesser weever	Native	Not evaluated	
Trachinus draco	Linnaeus, 1758	Greater weever	Native	Not evaluated	
Ordo: Pleuronectiformes
Family: Bothidae
Arnoglossus laterna	(Walbaum, 1792)	Mediterranean scaldfish	Native	Not evaluated	
Family: Pleuronectidae
Glyptocephalus cynoglossus	(Linnaeus, 1758)	Witch	Native	Not evaluated	
Hippoglossoides platessoides	(O. Fabricius, 1780)	American plaice	Native	Not evaluated	
Hippoglossus hippoglossus	(Linnaeus, 1758)	Atlantic halibut	Native	Endangered	
Limanda limanda	(Linnaeus, 1758)	Common dab	Native	Not evaluated	
Microstomus kitt	(Walbaum, 1792)	Lemon sole	Native	Not evaluated	
Platichthys flesus	(Linnaeus, 1758)	European flounder	Native	Least concern	
Pleuronectes platessa	(Linnaeus, 1758)	European plaice	Native	Least concern	
Family: Scophthalmidae
Lepidorhombus whiffiagonis	(Walbaum, 1792)	Megrim	Native	Not evaluated	
Phrynorhombus norvegicus	(Günther, 1862)	Norwegian topknot	Native	Not evaluated	
Scophthalmus maximus	(Linnaeus, 1758)	Turbot	Native	Not evaluated	
Scophthalmus rhombus	(Linnaeus, 1758)	Brill	Native	Not evaluated	
Zeugopterus punctatus	(Bloch, 1787)	Topknot	Native	Not evaluated	
Family: Soleidae
Buglossidium luteum	(Risso, 1810)	Solenette	Native	Least concern	
Microchirus variegatus	(Donovan, 1808)	Thickback sole	Native	Not evaluated	
Solea solea	(Linnaeus, 1758)	Common sole	Native	Not evaluated	
Ordo: Tetraodontiformes
Family: Molidae
Mola mola	(Linnaeus, 1758)	Ocean sunfish	Native	Not evaluated	
Ranzania laevis	(Pennant, 1776)	Slender sunfish	Native	Not evaluated	
Ordo: Beryciformes
Family: Berycidae
Beryx decadactylus	(Cuvier, 1829)	Alfonsino	Native	Not evaluated	
Ordo: Zeiformes
Family: Caproidae
Capros aper	(Linnaeus, 1758)	Boar fish	Native	Not evaluated	
Family: Zeidae
Zeus faber	(Linnaeus, 1758)	John Dory	Native	Not evaluated	

== See also ==
- List of fishes of Germany
- List of fishes of the Black Sea

== Sources ==
- Sven Gehrmann: Die Fauna der Nordsee — Wirbeltiere: Meerestiere der nordeuropäischen Küsten. April 2009, ISBN 3981255313
- Bent J. Muus, Jørgen G. Nielsen: Die Meeresfische Europas. In Nordsee, Ostsee und Atlantik. Franckh-Kosmos Verlag, ISBN 3440078043
- FishBase Fishspecies in North Sea
