= List of fishes of Denmark =

This is a list of fish found in and around Denmark, in both fresh water (lakes, rivers, streams and man-made pools) and salt water. The principal source is the Atlas of Danish Fishes (Fiskeatlas). This atlas comprises a published atlas of Danish freshwater fishes and a yet unpublished atlas of saltwater fishes. Common Danish names are given in parentheses after the Latin names.

== Agnatha - jawless fish ==
=== Myxini - hagfish ===
==== Myxinidae - hagfish ====
- Atlantic hagfish, Myxine glutinosa (Slimål)

=== Petromyzontiformes - lampreys ===
==== Petromyzontidae - northern lampreys ====
- River lamprey, Lampetra fluviatilis (Flodlampret)
- Brook lamprey, Lampetra planeri (Bæklampret)
- Sea lamprey, Petromyzon marinus (Havlampret/Niøje)

== Chondrichthyes - cartilaginous fish ==
=== Chimaeriformes - ratfish ===
==== Chimaeridae - short-nosed chimaeras ====
- Ratfish, Chimaera monstrosa (Havmus)

=== Hexanchiformes - cow sharks and frilled sharks ===
==== Hexanchidae - cow sharks ====
- Bluntnose sixgill shark, Hexanchus griseus (Seksgællet haj)

=== Squaliformes - dogfish sharks ===
==== Squalidae - true dogfish ====
- Spurdog, Squalus acanthias (Pighaj)

==== Etmopteridae - lantern sharks ====
- Velvet belly lanternshark, Etmopterus spinax (Sorthaj)

==== Oxynotidae - rough sharks ====
- Angular roughshark, Oxynotus centrina (Trekanthaj)

==== Somniosidae - sleeper sharks ====
- Greenland shark, Somniosus microcephalus (Gønlandshaj/Havkal)

=== Lamniformes - mackerel sharks ===
==== Cetorhinidae - basking sharks ====
- Basking shark, Cetorhinus maximus (Brugde)

==== Lamnidae - mackerel sharks ====
- Porbeagle, Lamna nasus (Sildehaj)

==== Alopiidae - thresher sharks ====
- Thresher shark, Alopias vulpinus (Rævehaj)

=== Carchariniformes - ground sharks ===
==== Scyliorhinidae - catsharks ====
- Blackmouth catshark, Galeus melastomus (Ringhaj)
- Lesser spotted dogfish, Scyliorhinus canicula (Småplettet rødhaj)

==== Carcharhinidae - requiem sharks ====
- Blue shark, Prionace glauca (Blåhaj)

==== Triakidae - houndsharks ====
- Tope, Galeorhinus galeus (Gråhaj)
- Starry smooth-hound, Mustelus asterias (Stjernehaj)

=== Squatiniformes - angel sharks ===
==== Squatinidae - angel sharks ====
- Angel shark, Squatina squatina (Havengel)

=== Rajiformes - skates and rays ===
==== Rajidae - skates ====
- Thorny skate, Amblyraja radiata (Tærpe)
- Common skate, Dipturus batis (Dværgskade)
- Flapper skate Dipturus intermedius (Storskade)
- Long-nosed skate, Dipturus oxyrinchus (Plovjernsrokke)
- Shagreen ray, Leucoraja fullonica (Gøgerokke)
- Cuckoo ray, Leucoraja naevus (Pletrokke)
- Blonde ray, Raja brachyura (Småplettet rokke)
- Thornback ray, Raja clavata (Sømrokke)
- Spotted ray, Raja montagui (Storplettet rokke)
- Sailray, Rajella lintea (Hvidrokke)
- Round ray, Rajella fyllae (Fyllas rokke)

=== Myliobatiformes - stingrays ===
==== Dasyatidae - whiptail stingrays ====
- Common stingray, Dasyatis pastinaca (Pigrokke)

==== Myliobatidae - eagle rays ====
- Common eagle ray, Myliobatis aquila (Ørnerokke)

=== Torpediniformes - electric rays ===
==== Torpedinidae - torpedo rays ====
- Marbled electric ray, Torpedo marmorata (Marmoreret elrokke)
- Atlantic torpedo, Torpedo nobiliana (Sort elrokke)

== Osteichthyes - bony fish ==
=== Acipenseriformes - sturgeon ===
==== Acipenseridae - sturgeon ====
- Siberian sturgeon, Acipenser baerii (Sibirisk stør)
- Russian sturgeon, Acipenser gueldenstaedtii (Diamantstør)
- Atlantic sturgeon, Acipenser oxyrinchus (Vestatlantisk stør)
- European sea sturgeon, Acipenser sturio (Europæisk stør)
- Starry sturgeon, Acipenser stellatus (Stjernestør)
- Beluga, Huso huso (Belugastør)

=== Anguilliformes - true eels ===
==== Anguillidae - freshwater eels ====
- European eel, Anguilla anguilla (Ål)

==== Congridae - congers ====
- Conger eel, Conger conger (Havål)

==== Nemichthyidae - snipe eels ====
- Slender snipe eel, Nemichthys scolopaceus (Langhalet sneppeål)

=== Clupeiformes - herring ===
==== Clupeidae - true herrings ====
- Allis shad, Alosa alosa (Majsild)
- Twaite shad, Alosa fallax (Stavsild)
- Atlantic herring, Clupea harengus (Sild)
- Sprat, Sprattus sprattus (Brisling)
- European pilchard, Sardina pilchardus (Sardin)

==== Engraulidae - anchovies ====
- European anchovy, Engraulis encrasicolus (Ansjos)

=== Cypriniformes - carp and allies ===
==== Cyprinidae - carp, minnows and barbs ====
- Common bream/bronze bream/skimmer bream, Abramis brama (Brasen)
- Bleak, Alburnus alburnus (Løje)
- Silver bream, Blicca bjoerkna (Flire)
- Goldfish, Carassius auratus (Sølvkarusse/Guldfisk)
- Crucian carp, Carassius carassius (Karusse)
- Grass carp, Ctenopharygodon idella (Græskarpe)
- Common carp, Cyprinus carpio (Karpe)
- Gudgeon, Gobio gobio (Grundling)
- Silver carp, Hypophthalmichthys molitrix (Sølvkarpe)
- Sunbleak, Leucaspius delineatus (Regnløje)
- Orfe, Leuciscus idus (Rimte)
- Common dace, Leuciscus leuciscus (Strømskalle)
- Eurasian minnow, Phoxinus phoxinus (Elritse)
- Topmouth gudgeon, Pseudorasbora parva (Båndgrundling)
- European bitterling, Rhodeus amarus (Bitterling)
- Roach, Rutilus rutilus (Skalle)
- Common rudd, Scardinius erythrophthalmus (Rudskalle)
- Tench, Tinca tinca (Suder)

==== Cobitidae - true loaches ====
- Spined loach, Cobitis taenia (Pigsmerling)
- European weatherfish, Misgurnus fossilis (Dyndsmerling)

==== Nemacheilidae - stone loaches ====
- Stone loach, Barbatula barbatula (Smerling)

=== Siluriformes - catfish ===
==== Ictaluridae - bullhead catfish ====
- Brown bullhead, Ameiurus nebulosus (Brun dværgmalle)

==== Siluridae - Eurasian catfish ====
- Wels catfish, Silurus glanis (Europæisk malle)

=== Esociformes - pike ===
==== Esocidae - pike ====
- Northern pike, Esox lucius (Gedde)

=== Osmeriformes - smelt ===
==== Osmeridae - smelt ====
- European smelt, Osmerus eperlanus (Smelt)

=== Argentiniformes - argentines and slickheads ===
==== Argentinidae - argentines ====
- Greater argentine, Argentina silus (Guldlaks)
- Lesser argentine, Argentina sphyraena (Strømsild)

=== Stomiiformes - dragonfish and marine hatchetfish ===
==== Sternoptychidae - marine hatchetfishes ====
- Atlantic hatchetfish, Argyropelacus olfersii (Olfers sølvøkse)

=== Salmoniformes - salmon and trout ===
==== Salmonidae - salmon and trout ====
- European cisco, Coregonus albula (Heltling)
- Maraena whitefish, Coregonus maraena (Helt/Snæbel)
- Pink salmon, Oncorhynchus gorbuscha (Pukkellaks)
- Coho salmon, Oncorhynchus kisutch (Sølvlaks)
- Rainbow trout, Oncorhynchus mykiss (Regnbueørred)
- Atlantic salmon, Salmo salar (Laks)
- Brown trout/sea trout/Dollaghan, Salmo trutta (Havørred)
- Grayling, Thymallus thymallus (Stalling)

=== Stomiiformes - dragonfish and marine hatchetfish ===
==== Sternoptychidae - marine hatchetfishes ====
- Mueller's pearlside, Maurolicus muelleri (Laksesild)

=== Aulopiformes - grinners ===
==== Paralepididae - barracudinas ====
- Duckbill barracudina, Magnisudis atlantica (Kort laksetobis)

=== Myctophiformes - lanternfish ===
==== Myctophidae - lanternfish ====
- Spotted lanternfish, Myctophum punctatum (Slankhalet prikfisk)
- Lancet fish, Notoscopelus kroyeri (Krøjers prikfisk)

=== Lampriformes - opahs and allies ===
==== Lampridae - opahs ====
- Opah, Lampris guttatus (Glansfisk)

==== Regalecidae - oarfish ====
- Giant oarfish, Regalecus glesne (Sildekonge)

==== Trachipteridae - ribbonfish ====
- Dealfish, Trachipterus arcticus (Vågmær)

=== Gadiformes - cod ===
==== Lotidae - lings ====
- Cusk, Brosme brosme (Brosme)
- Fivebeard rockling, Ciliata mustela (Femtrådet havkvabbe)
- Four-bearded rockling, Enchelyopus cimbrius (Firtrådet havkvabbe)
- Three-bearded rockling, Gaidropsarus vulgaris (Tretrådet havkvabbe)
- Burbot, Lota lota (Knude)
- Blue ling, Molva dypterygia (Byrkelange)
- Common ling, Molva molva (Lange)

==== Gadidae - codfishes ====
- Thor's pout, Gadiculus thori (Sølvtorsk)
- Atlantic cod, Gadus morhua (Torsk)
- Haddock, Melanogrammus aeglefinus (Kuller)
- Whiting, Merlangius merlangus (Hvilling)
- Blue whiting, Micromesistius poutassou (Blåvilling/Sortmund)
- Pollock, Pollachius pollachus (Lubbe/Lyssej)
- Saithe, Pollachius virens (Sej/mørksej)
- Tadpole fish, Raniceps raninus (Sortvels)
- Norway pout, Trisopterus esmarcki (Sperling)
- Pouting, Trisopterus luscus (Skægtorsk)
- Poor cod, Trisopterus minutus (Glyse)

==== Merlucciidae - hakes ====
- European hake, Merluccius merluccius (Kulmule)

==== Phycidae - forkbeards ====
- Greater forkbeard, Phycis blennoides (Skælbrosme)

==== Macrouridae - grenadiers ====
- Rock grenadier, Coryphaenoides rupestris (Skolæst)
- Softhead grenadier, Malacocephalus laevis (Småskællet skolæst)

=== Lophiiformes - anglerfish ===
==== Lophiidae - goosefish ====
- Blackbellied angler, Lophius budegassa (Sort havtaske)
- Monkfish, Lophius piscatorius (Havtaske)

=== Mugiliformes - mullet ===
==== Mugilidae - mullet ====
- Thicklip grey mullet, Chelon labrosus (Tyklæbet multe)
- Golden grey mullet, Liza aurata (Guldmulte)
- Thinlip mullet, Liza ramada (Tyndlæbet multe)

=== Atheriniformes - sand smelts ===
==== Atherinidae - sand smelts ====
- Sand smelt, Atherina presbyter (Stribefisk)

=== Beloniformes - garfish and allies ===
==== Belonidae - garfish ====
- Garfish, Belone belone (Hornfisk)

==== Scomberesocidae - sauries ====
- Atlantic saury, Scomberesox saurus (Makrelgedde)

==== Exocoetidae - flyingfish ====
- Mediterranean flyingfish, Cheilopogon heterurus (Flyvefisk)

=== Zeiformes - dories ===
==== Zeidae - true dories ====
- John Dory, Zeus faber (Sankt Petersfisk)

=== Beryciformes - alfonsinos and allies ===
==== Berycidae - alfonsinos ====
- Alfonsino, Beryx decadactylus (Nordisk beryx)

=== Gasterosteiformes - sticklebacks and seahorses ===
==== Centriscidae - snipefish ====
- Longspine snipefish, Macroramphosus scolopax (Sneppefisk)

==== Syngnathidae - pipefish and seahorses ====
- Snake pipefish, Entelurus aequoreus (Snippe)
- Long-snouted seahorse, Hippocampus guttulatus (Almindelig søhest)
- Short-snouted seahorse, Hippocampus hippocampus (Kortsnudet søhest)
- Worm pipefish, Nerophis lumbriciformis (Krumsnudet næbsnog)
- Straightnose pipefish, Nerophis ophidion (Stor næbsnog)
- Greater pipefish, Syngathus acus (Stor tangnål)
- Lesser pipefish, Syngnathus rostellatus (Lille tangnål)
- Broadnosed pipefish, Syngnathus typhle (Almindelig tangnål)

==== Gasterosteidae - sticklebacks ====
- Three-spined stickleback, Gasterosteus aculeatus (Trepigget hundestejle)
- Nine-spined stickleback, Pungitius pungitius (Nipigget hundestejle)
- Fifteen-spined stickleback, Spinachia spinachia (Tangsnarre)

=== Tetraodontiformes - ocean sunfish and allies ===
==== Molidae - ocean sunfish ====
- Ocean sunfish, Mola mola (Klumpfisk)

==== Balistidae - triggerfish ====
- Grey triggerfish, Balistes capriscus (Aftrækkerfisk)

=== Pleuronectiformes - flatfish ===
==== Scophthalmidae - turbots ====
- Megrim, Lepidorhombus whiffiagonis (Glashvarre)
- European turbot, Psetta maxima (Pigvar)
- Brill, Scophthalmus rhombus (Slethvarre)
- Norwegian topknot, Zeugopterus norvegicus (Småhvarre)
- Common topknot, Zeugopterus punctatus (Hårhvarre)

==== Pleuronectidae - flounders ====
- Torbay sole, Glyptocephalus cynoglossus (Skærising)
- Long rough dab, Hippoglossoides platessoides (Håising)
- Atlantic halibut, Hippoglossus hippoglossus (Helleflynder)
- Common dab, Limanda limanda (Ising)
- Lemon sole, Microstomus kitt (Rødtunge)
- European flounder, Platichthys flesus (Skrubbe)
- European plaice, Pleuronectes platessa (Rødspætte)

==== Soleidae - true soles ====
- Solenette, Buglossidium luteum (Glastunge)
- Dover sole, Solea solea (Tunge/Søtunge)

==== Bothidae - scaldfish ====
- Mediterranean scaldfish, Arnoglossus laterna (Tungehvarre)

=== Scorpaeniformes - scorpionfish and allies ===
==== Agonidae - poachers ====
- Pogge, Agonus cataphractus (Panserulk)

==== Cottidae - sculpins ====
- Father lasher, Myoxocephalus scorpius (Almindelig ulk)
- European bullhead, Cottus gobio (Almindelig ferskvandsulk)
- Alpine bullhead, Cottus poecilopus (Finnestribet ferskvandsulk)
- Long-spined sea scorpion, Taurulus bubalis (Langtornet ulk)
- Norway bullhead, Taurulus lilljeborgi (Dværgulk)
- Moustache sculpin, Triglops murrayi (Murrays knurulk)

==== Cyclopteridae - lumpsuckers ====
- Lumpsucker, Cyclopterus lumpus (Stenbider)

==== Liparidae - snailfish ====
- Common seasnail, Liparis liparis (Finnebræmmet ringbug)
- Montagu's snailfish, Liparis montagui (Særfinnet ringbug)

==== Sebastidae - rockfish (seaperch) ====
- Bluemouth, Helicolenus dactylopterus (Blåkæft)
- Norway haddock, Sebastes norvegicus (Stor rødfisk)
- Red perch, Sebastes viviparus (Lille rødfisk)

==== Triglidae - gurnards ====
- Red gurnard, Aspitriglia cuculus (Tværstribet knurhane)
- Grey gurnard, Eutriglia gurnardus (Grå knurhane)
- Long-finned gurnard, Lepidotrigla argus
- Tub gurnard, Trigla lucerna (Rød knurhane)
- Piper gurnard, Trigla lyra (Langpigget knurhane)

=== Perciformes - perchlike fishes ===
==== Bramidae - pomfrets ====
- Atlantic pomfret, Brama brama (Havbrasen)

==== Carangidae - jacks ====
- Derbio, Trachinotus ovatus (Gaffelmakrel)
- Atlantic horse mackerel, Trachurus trachurus (Hestemakrel)

==== Centrarchidae - freshwater sunfish ====
- Pumpkinseed, Lepomis gibbosus (Almindelig solaborre)

==== Echeneidae - remoras ====
- Common remora, Remora remora (Almindelig sugefisk)

==== Moronidae - temperate sea bass ====
- European sea bass, Dicentrarchus labrax (Havbars)

==== Mullidae - goatfish ====
- Striped mullet, Mullus surmuletus (Stribet mulle)

==== Percidae - true perch ====
- Ruffe, Gymnocephalus cernua (Hork)
- European perch, Perca fluviatilis (Aborre)
- Zander, Stizostedion lucioperca (Sandart)

==== Polyprionidae - wreckfish ====
- Atlantic wreckfish, Polyprion americanus (Vragfisk)

==== Sciaenidae - drums ====
- Atlantic croaker Micropogonias undulatus (Atlantisk trommefisk)

==== Sparidae - seabream ====
- Bogue, Boops boops (Okseøjefisk)
- White seabream, Diplodus sargus (Sorthale)
- Spanish bream, Pagellus acarne (Akarnanisk blankesten)
- Blackspot seabream, Pagellus bogaraveo (Spidstandet blankesten)
- Pandora bream, Pagellus erythrinus (Rød blankesten)
- Salema porgy, Sarpa salpa (Stribet havrude)
- Gilt-head bream, Sparus aurata (Guldbrasen)
- Black sea bream, Spondyliosoma cantharus (Almindelig havrude)

==== Labridae - wrasse ====
- Rock cook, Centrolabrus exoletus (Småmundet gylte)
- Mediterranean rainbow wrasse, Coris julis (Junkergylte)
- Goldsinny wrasse, Ctenolabrus rupestris (Havkarusse)
- Ballan wrasse, Labrus bergylta (Berggylte)
- Cuckoo wrasse, Labrus mixtus (Rødnæb/Blåstak)
- Corkwing wrasse, Symphodus melops (Savgylte)

==== Anarhichadidae - wolffish ====
- Northern wolffish, Anarhichas denticulatus (Blå havkat)
- Atlantic wolffish, Anarhichas lupus (Havkat)

==== Pholidae - gunnels ====
- Rock gunnel, Pholis gunnellus (Tangspræl)

==== Stichaeidae - pricklebacks ====
- Yarrell's blenny, Chirolophis ascanii (Buskhoved)
- Daubed shanny, Leptoclinus maculatus (Plettet langebarn)
- Snake blenny, Lumpenus lampretaeformis (Spidshalet langebarn)

==== Zoarcidae - eelpouts ====
- Sar's eelpout, Lycenchelys sarsii (Sars' porebrosme)
- Vahl's eelpout, Lycodes gracilis (Ålebrosme)
- Viviparous eelpout, Zoarces viviparus (Ålekvabbe)

==== Ammodytidae - sand eels ====
- Raitt's sand eel, Ammodytes marinus (Havtobis)
- Lesser sand eel, Ammodytes tobianus (Kysttobis)
- Smooth sand eel, Gymnammodytes semisquamatus (Nøgentobis)
- Great sandeel, Hyperoplus lanceolatus (Plettet tobiskonge)

==== Trachinidae - weevers ====
- Lesser weever, Echiichthys vipera (Lille fjæsing)
- Greater weever, Trachinus draco (Fjæsing)

==== Callionymidae - dragonets ====
- Common dragonet, Callionymus lyra (Stribet fløjfisk)
- Spotted dragonet, Callionymus maculatus (Plettet fløjfisk)
- Reticulated dragonet, Callionymus reticulatus (Kortfinnet fløjfisk)

==== Gobiidae - gobies ====
- Transparent goby, Aphia minuta (Glaskutling)
- Jeffrey's goby, Buenia jeffreysii (Jeffreys' kutling)
- Crystal goby, Crystallogobius linearis (Krystalkutling)
- Black goby, Gobius niger (Sortkutling)
- Spotted goby, Gobiusculus flavescens (Toplettet kutling)
- Guillet's goby, Lebetus guilleti (Dværgkutling)
- Diminutive goby, Lebetus scorpioides (Ulkekutling)
- Fries's goby, Leseurigobius friesii (Spidshalet kutling)
- Round goby, Neogobius melanostomus (Sortmundet kutling)
- Common goby, Pomatoschistus microps (Lerkutling)
- Sand goby, Potamoschistus minutus (Sandkutling)
- Norway goby, Pomatoschistus norvegicus (Norsk kutling)
- Painted goby, Potamoschistus pictus (Spættet kutling)
- Leopard-spotted goby, Thorogobius ephippiatus (Leopardkutling)

==== Gempylidae - snake mackerels ====
- Black gemfish, Nesiarchus nasutus (Geddetryne)

==== Scombridae - mackerel and tuna ====
- Bullet tuna, Auxis rochei (Fregatmakrel)
- Little tunny, Euthynnus alletteratus (Thunnin)
- Atlantic bonito, Sarda sarda (Rygstribet pelamide)
- Atlantic mackerel, Scomber scombrus (Makrel)
- Atlantic bluefin tuna, Thunnus thynnus (Tun)

==== Xiphiidae - swordfish ====
- Swordfish, Xiphias gladius (Sværdfisk)

==== Centrolophidae - medusafish ====
- Rudderfish, Centrolophus niger (Almindelig sortfisk)
- Cornish blackfish, Schedophilus medusophagus (Engelsk sortfisk)

==== Caproidae - boarfish ====
- Boarfish, Capros aper (Havgalt)
