= Travin =

Travin (Russian: Травин) is a surname. Notable people with the surname include:

- Aleksandr Travin (1937–1989), Soviet Olympic basketball player
- Andrei Travin (b. 1979), Kazakh association football player
- Gleb Travin (1902–1979), Russian cyclist
