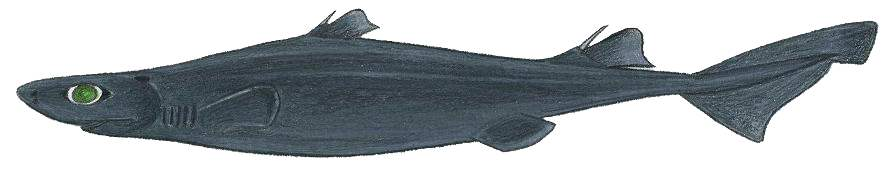

Conservation status
- Least Concern (IUCN 3.1)

Scientific classification
- Kingdom: Animalia
- Phylum: Chordata
- Class: Chondrichthyes
- Subclass: Elasmobranchii
- Division: Selachii
- Order: Squaliformes
- Family: Etmopteridae
- Genus: Etmopterus
- Species: E. princeps

Binomial name
- Etmopterus princeps (Collett, 1904)
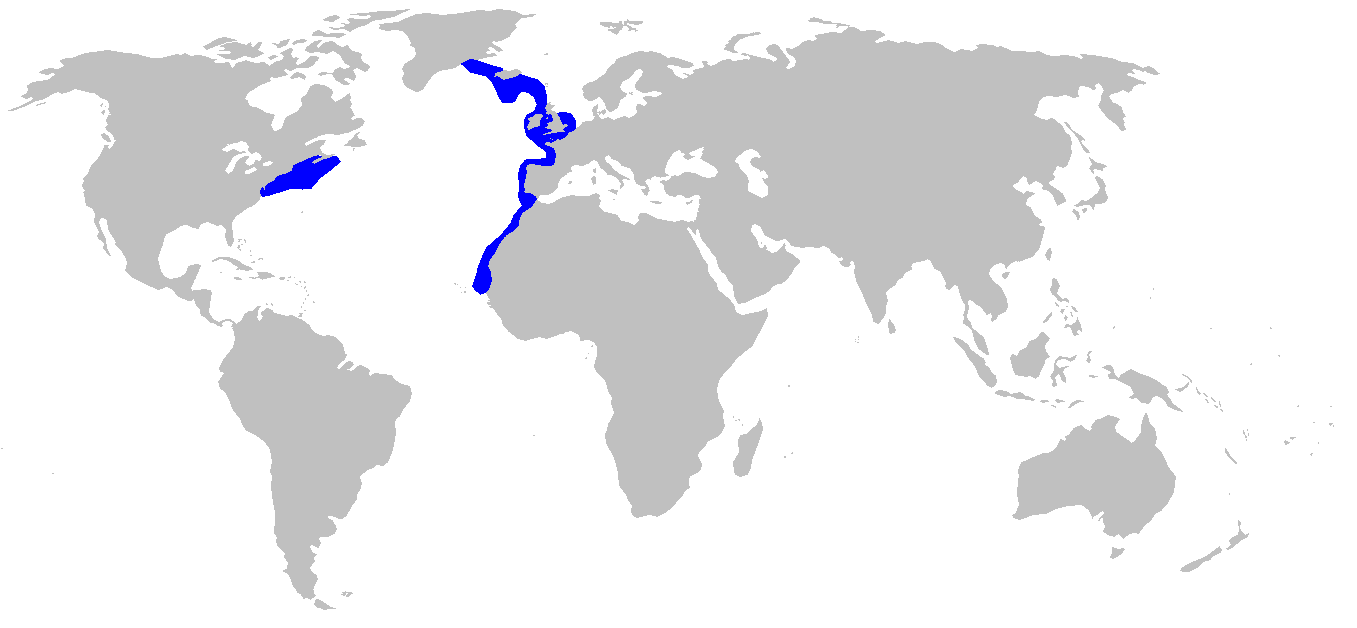
- Range of the great lanternshark (in blue)

= Great lanternshark =

Species of shark

The great lanternshark (Etmopterus princeps) is a shark of the family Etmopteridae found in the northeast and northwest Atlantic. Its name was given because, at the time of its discovery, it was thought to be bioluminescent, but this has been challenged.

== Description ==
Great lanternsharks are slender and small, and are generally found in deep water. They can grow up to 75 centimetres (30 in). They are sexually dimorphic; females are larger than males. They are black or very dark brown, uniformly, in color, and lack an anal fin. They live at depths between 570 metres (1,870 ft) and 2,200 metres (7,200 ft). The dorsal fins have an associated spine.
