= Gleb Travin =

Gleb Leontyevich Travin (Глеб Леонтьевич Травин, 28 April 1902, Pskovskiy — October 1979, Pskov) was a Soviet bicyclist, known for circumnavigating the Soviet Union on bicycle between 1928 and 1931.

An electrician by trade, Gleb commenced his journey from Vladivostok. He rode across Siberia to Central Asia, crossed the Caspian Sea by ferry, and then turned north towards Murmansk. From there he returned via the arctic coast to Uelen. The total distance of the ride over the course of the 3 years was 85,000 km.
