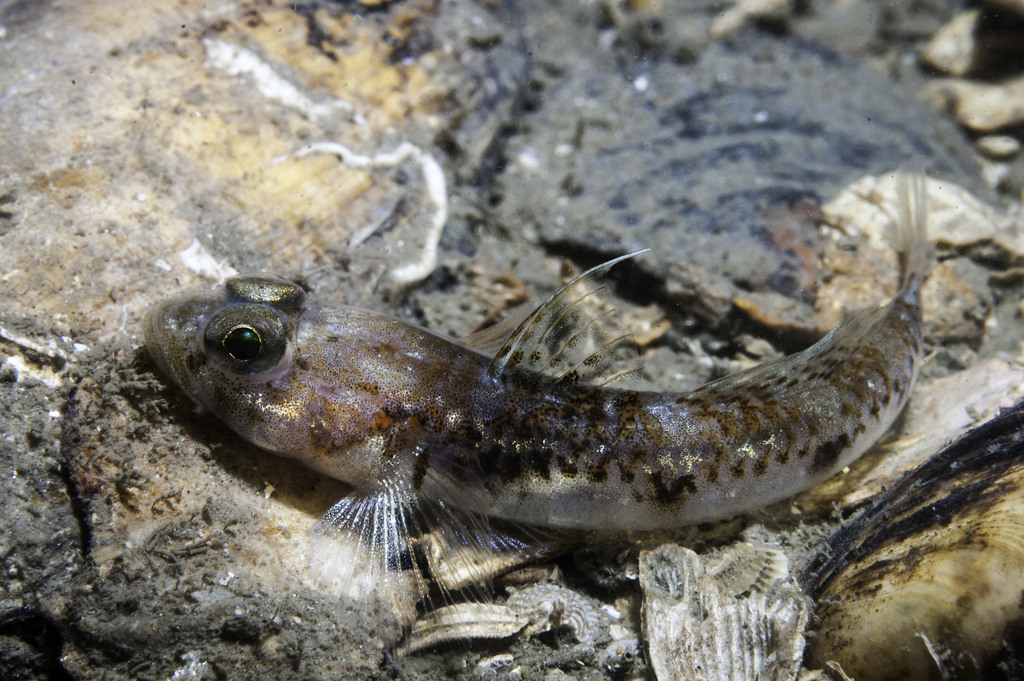

Conservation status
- Least Concern (IUCN 3.1)

Scientific classification
- Kingdom: Animalia
- Phylum: Chordata
- Class: Actinopterygii
- Division: Teleostei
- Order: Gobiiformes
- Family: Oxudercidae
- Genus: Buenia
- Species: B. jeffreysii

Binomial name
- Buenia jeffreysii (Günther, 1867)

Synonyms
- Gobius jeffreysii Günther, 1867; Gobius jeffreysi Günther, 1867; Buenia jeffreysi Günther, 1867

= Jeffrey's goby =

Species of fish

The Jeffrey's goby (Buenia jeffreysii) is a species of goby fish.

== Description ==
It maximum length is 6 cm (2.4 in). It has 5–6 dorsal spines and 8–10 dorsal soft rays; 1 anal spine and 7–8 anal soft rays; and 30 vertebrae. The male can be distinguished by the second ray of the first dorsal fin, which is elongated. It is silvery in colour, with red and dark brown blotches.

== Habitat ==
Jeffrey's goby lives in the North Atlantic Ocean; it is a demersal fish, living at depths of 5–330 m (16–1,083 ft). It is common in the waters around Great Britain and Ireland. It is one of only two gobies that can live in the cold waters off southeast Iceland, the other being Lebetus scorpioides. It is also recorded in the Mediterranean Sea.

== Behaviour ==
Jeffrey's goby spawns in May to September. Its eggs are pear-shaped and laid in mussel shells, and guarded by the male. It feeds on copepods, bony fish and crabs.
