= Lozano's goby =

Conservation status
- Least Concern (IUCN 3.1)

Scientific classification
- Kingdom: Animalia
- Phylum: Chordata
- Class: Actinopterygii
- Order: Gobiiformes
- Family: Oxudercidae
- Genus: Pomatoschistus
- Species: P. lozanoi

Binomial name
- Pomatoschistus lozanoi (F. de Buen, 1923)

Synonyms
- Gobius minutus lozanoi F. de Buen, 1923

Species of fish

Pomatoschistus lozanoi, Lozano's goby, is a species of goby native to the northeastern Atlantic Ocean from the North Sea to northwestern Spain and Portugal where it can be found at depths of from 70 to 80 metres (230 to 260 ft). This species can reach a length of 8 centimetres (3.1 in) TL and is known to live for only two years. The specific name honours the Spanish zoologist Luis Lozano Rey (1878–1958).
