= Du Bocage =

Historic house in Arkansas, United States

- U.S. National Register of Historic Places
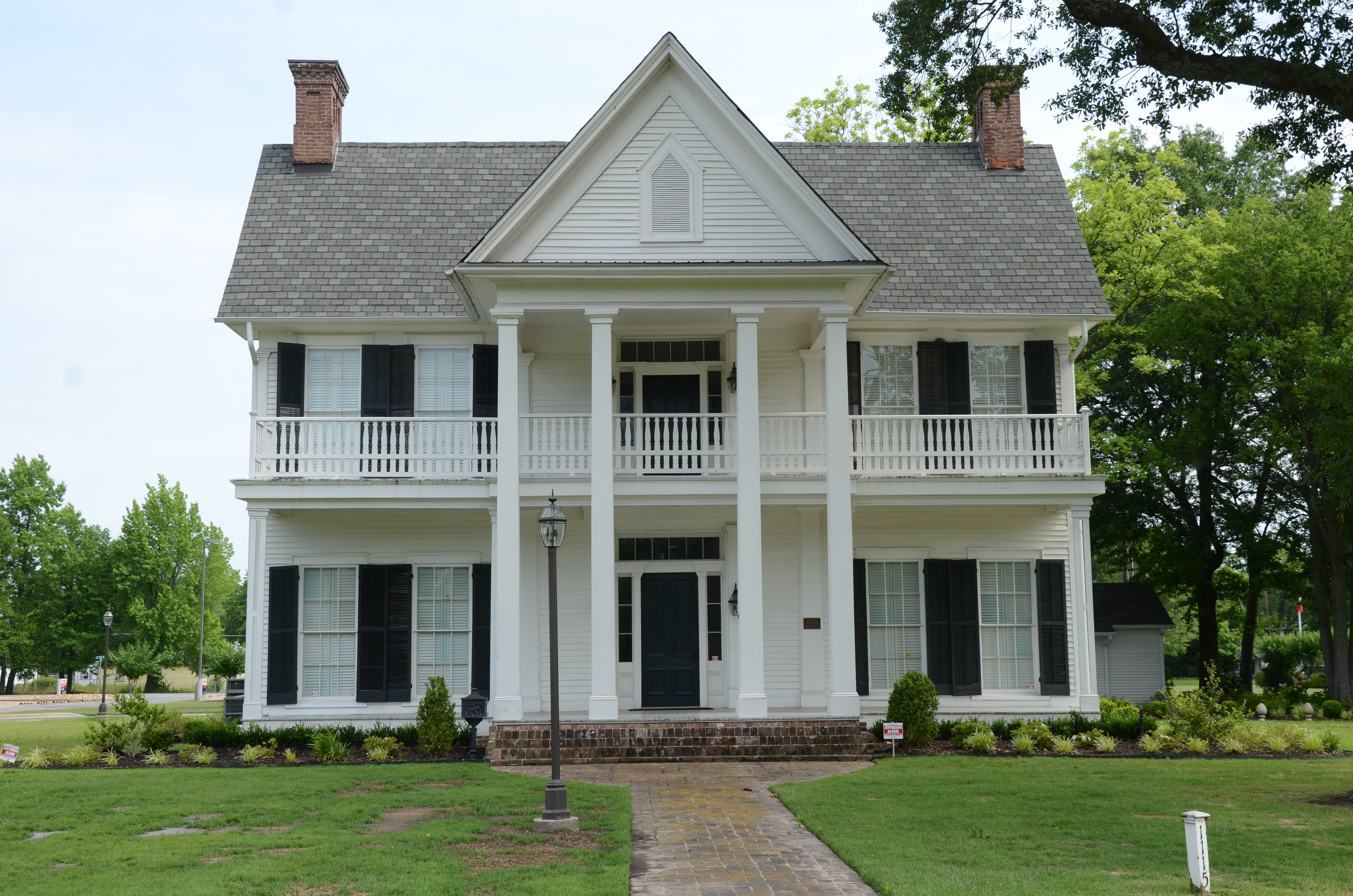

- Location within Arkansas Location within the United States
- Location: 1115 W. 4th St., Pine Bluff, Arkansas
- Coordinates: 34.2265°N 92.01422°W
- Area: 1.1 acres (0.45 ha)
- Built: 1866
- Architectural style: Greek Revival, Late Victorian
- NRHP reference No.: 74000478
- Added to NRHP: June 24, 1974

Du Bocage is a historic house at 1115 West 4th Street in Pine Bluff, Arkansas. It is a two-story wood-frame structure, with a side gable roof and weatherboard siding. A two-story gabled section projects from the center of the front, supported by large Greek Revival columns, with a balustraded porch on the second level. The house was built in 1866 by Joseph Bocage, a veteran of the American Civil War, using lumber from the land and milled by his own mills. Bocage was a prominent local businessman, who owned a brick manufactory and a steam engine production plant in the city.

The house was listed on the National Register of Historic Places in 1974.

== See also ==
- National Register of Historic Places listings in Jefferson County, Arkansas
