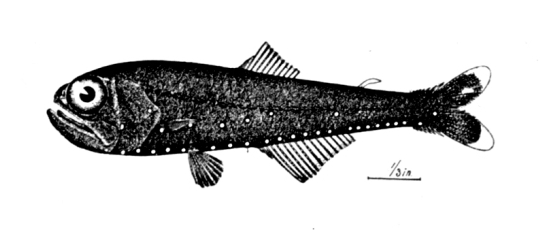

Scientific classification
- Domain: Eukaryota
- Kingdom: Animalia
- Phylum: Chordata
- Class: Actinopterygii
- Order: Myctophiformes
- Family: Myctophidae
- Genus: Benthosema
- Species: B. glaciale

Binomial name
- Benthosema glaciale (J. C. H. Reinhardt, 1837)

= Benthosema glaciale =

Species of fish

Benthosema glaciale, or glacier lantern fish, is the most common species of lanternfish and important part of the midwater ecosystem of northern North Atlantic.

It feeds on small crustaceans, including copepods, krill and amphipods, along with other small invertebrates.

== Distribution ==
Benthosema glaciale occurs in the North Atlantic as well as in the Mediterranean Sea. In the eastern Atlantic it is found from Guinea northwards to the Kara Sea, and in the western Atlantic from the northern edge of the Gulf Stream northwards to the Baffin Bay and Greenland. It is common in Norwegian fjords.

Benthosema glaciale is a mesopelagic fish that can be found from surface waters down to depth of 1,400 m (4,600 ft), but it is most common at around 300–400 m (980–1,310 ft). It undergoes diel vertical migration, moving to shallower water to feed at night. However, depth distribution can be bimodal at night, suggesting that not all individuals migrate.

== Life history ==
Benthosema glaciale can grow to 10.3 cm (4.1 in) SL. They have a maximum lifespan of about eight years, although typical lifespan is shorter. Maturity is reached at age 2–3 years. Spawning takes place mostly in summer. In Norway, oceanic populations grow slower but to a larger size than fjord populations. Mediterranean populations have smaller body size, shorter lifespan, and might spawn throughout the year.

== Gallery ==
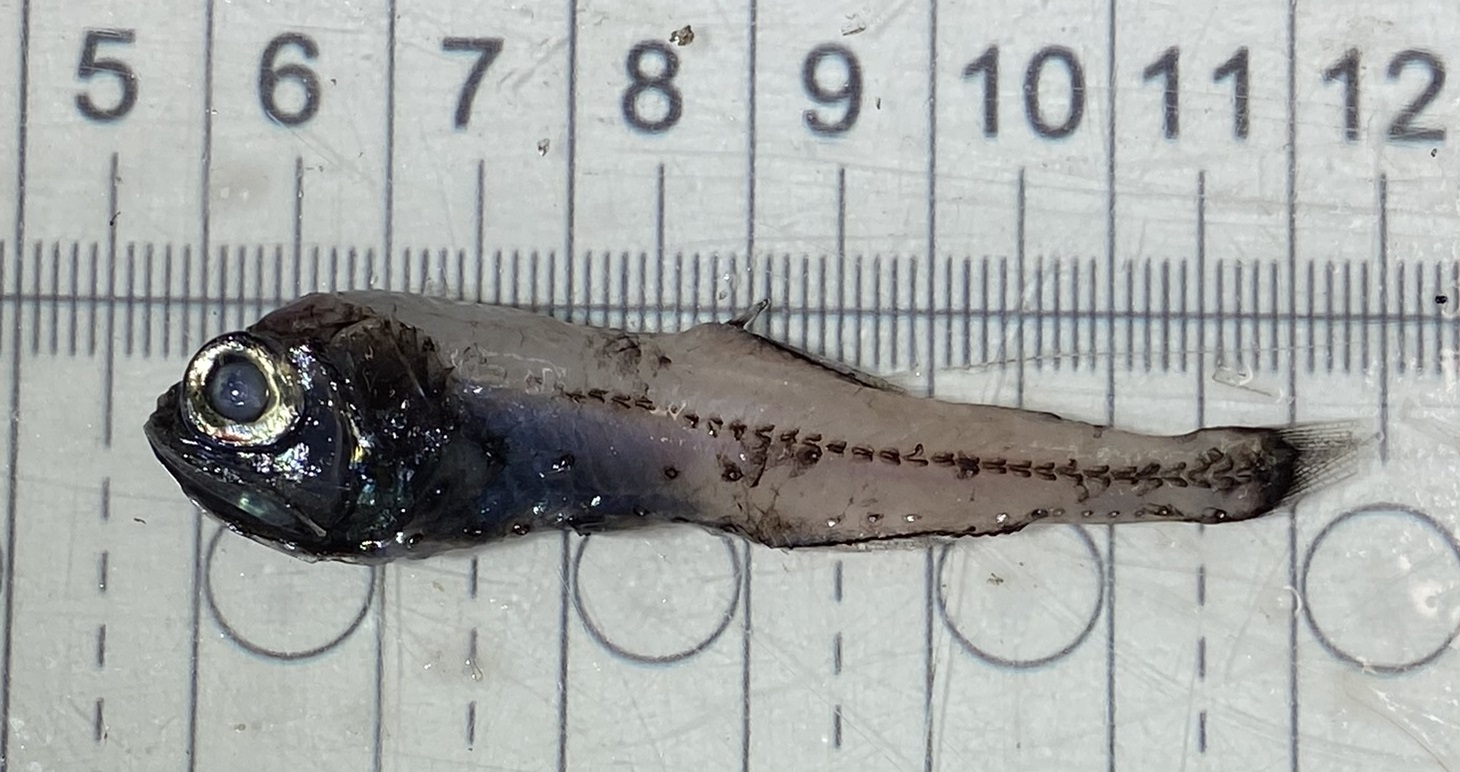
Freshly-caught specimen of Benthosema glaciale, representative of the condition this animal usually appears in when landed. The skin and scales have largely been abraded, and the fin rays are damaged, however photophores are still visible either as attachment scars or as reflective patches.

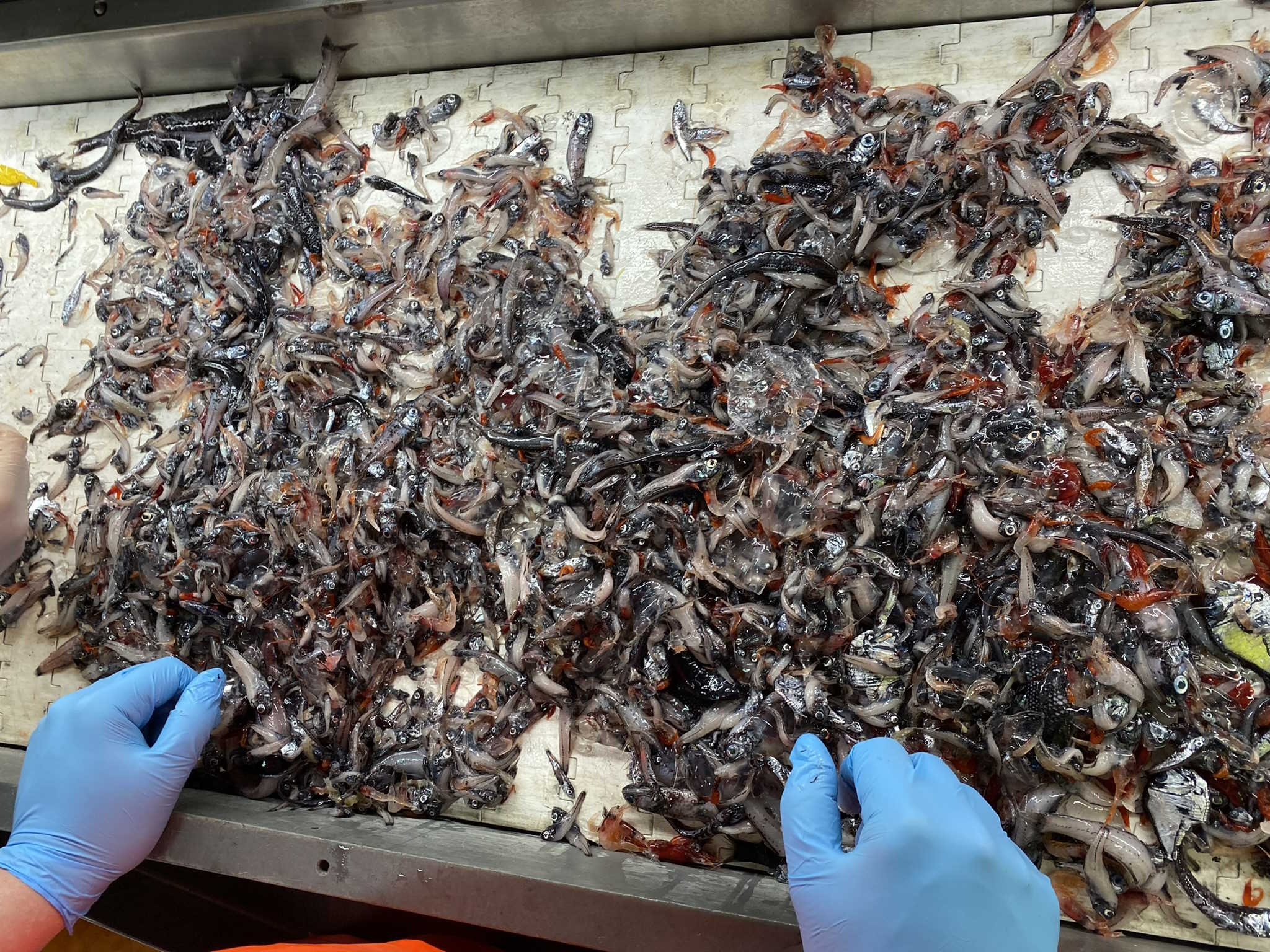
Mesopelagic catch from the North-East Atlantic, predominantly made up of Benthosema glaciale, though many other species of myctophids and other fishes are present in the catch.
