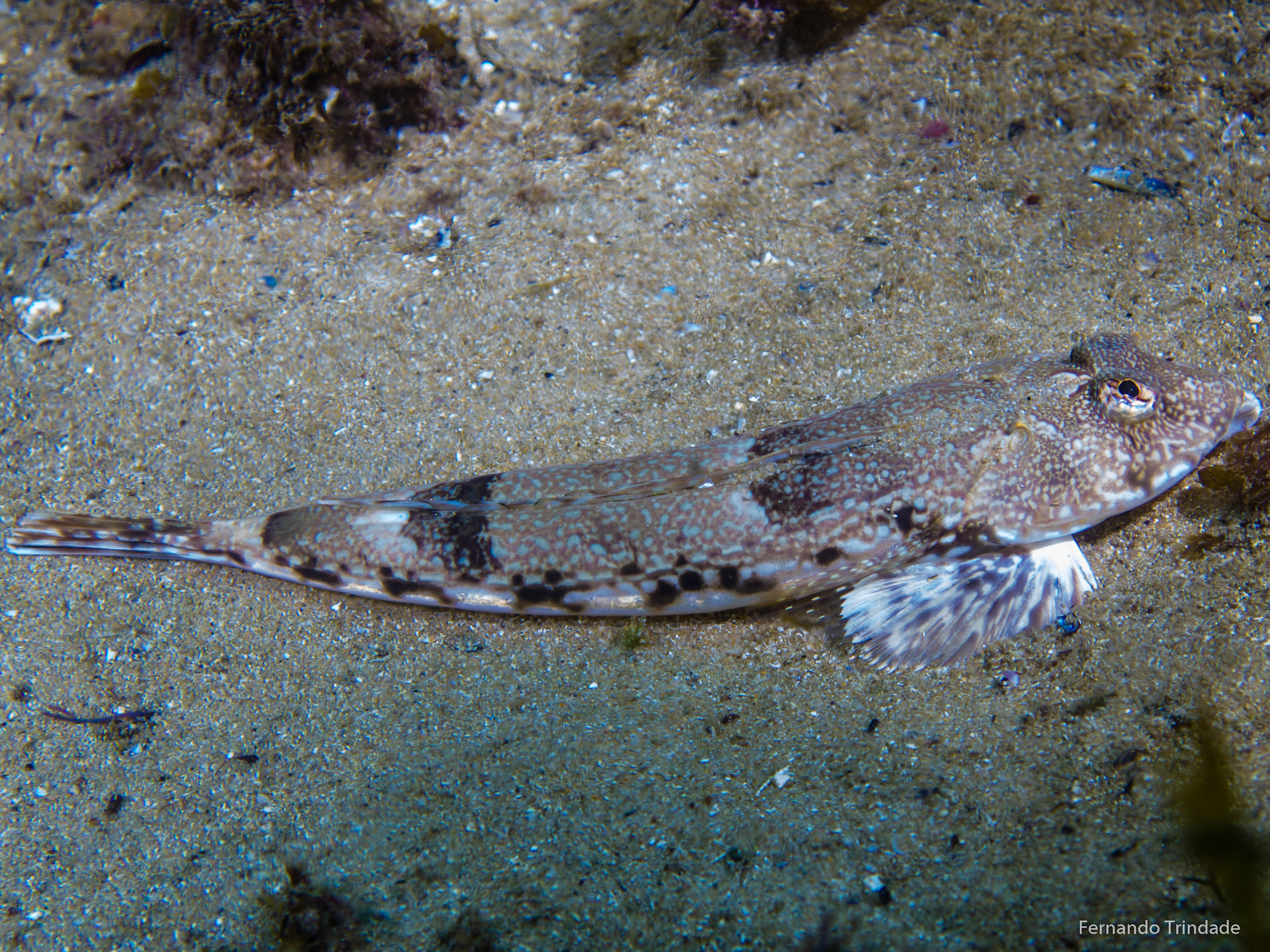

Conservation status
- Least Concern (IUCN 3.1)

Scientific classification
- Kingdom: Animalia
- Phylum: Chordata
- Class: Actinopterygii
- Order: Syngnathiformes
- Family: Callionymidae
- Genus: Callionymus
- Species: C. reticulatus

Binomial name
- Callionymus reticulatus Valenciennes, 1837

= Reticulated dragonet =

Species of fish

The reticulated dragonet (Callionymus reticulatus) is a species of dragonet native to the northeastern Atlantic Ocean and the Mediterranean Sea where it is found at depths of from 0 to 110 metres (0 to 361 ft). This species grows to a length of 11 centimetres (4.3 in) TL. This species has a flattened head and body, the head has a triangular shape with the eyes placed on the top of the head. It has two dorsal fins with the first one being triangular in shape. It has blue spots along the flanks and four saddle-like markings on their backs which have sharply defined outlines. It is similar to the common dragonet but is distinguished by its smaller size and the sharply defined border around the saddle markings on the back.

The reticulated dragonet is found only in the eastern Atlantic Ocean from Norway Morocco, including the Azores, and into the western Mediterranean Sea at least as far as Malaga. In the North Sea it has been recorded as far east as the Kattegat.

The reticulated dragonet is a demersal species that occurs in inshore waters, even in the intertidal zone, over sandy substrates. Its prefers shallow, soft substrates, often in estuarine environments, although it has been recorded as deep as 110 metres (360 ft). A survey compared seagrass beds and unvegetated habitats did not find this species in seagrass beds and recorded it in low numbers in the unvegetated habitats. Its eggs and larvae are pelagic. Its food is mainly small benthic invertebrates, mainly worms and crustaceans. In the North Sea its spawning season extends from March to June.
