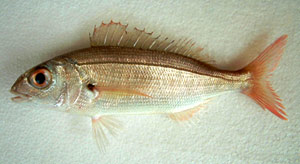

Conservation status
- Least Concern (IUCN 3.1)

Scientific classification
- Kingdom: Animalia
- Phylum: Chordata
- Class: Actinopterygii
- Order: Acanthuriformes
- Family: Sparidae
- Genus: Pagellus
- Species: P. acarne

Binomial name
- Pagellus acarne (Risso, 1827)

Synonyms
- Pagrus acarne Risso, 1827

= Pagellus acarne =

Species of fish

Pagellus acarne, the axillary seabream or Spanish seabream is a species of marine ray-finned fish belonging to the family Sparidae, which includes the seabreams and porgies. This fish is found in the eastern Atlantic Ocean and Mediterranean Sea.

== Taxonomy ==
Pagelles acarne was first formally described in 1827 as Pagrus acrane by the French zoologist Antoine Risso with its type locality given as Nice on the French Mediterranean coast. The genus Pagellus is placed in the family Sparidae within the order Spariformes by the 5th edition of Fishes of the World. Some authorities classify this genus in the subfamily Pagellinae, but the 5th edition of Fishes of the World does not recognise subfamilies within the Sparidae.

== Etymology ==
Pagellus acarne has the specific name acarne which Risso did not explain, however, Achille Valenciennes, writing in 1830, said that the name had been taken from Pliny the Elder and that Guillaume Rondelet had applied the name to this species "quite arbitrarily" in 1554.

== Description ==
Pagellus acarne has a moderately laterally flattened, fusiform body with a concave dorsal profile to the head above the eyes, a flat space between the eyes and a conical snout. The scales on the crown extend to are past a line equal to the rear edge of the eye. There are scales on the cheeks but the preoperculum is naked. The mouth is horizontal and has fleshy lips. Each jaw has pointed teeth at the front with molar-like teeth at the rear of the jaws with a band of numerous comb-like teeth immediately behind the front row of pointed teeth. There are 12 or 13 spines and between 10 and 12 soft rays supporting the dorsal fin while the anal fin is supported by 3 spines and 9 or 10 soft rays. The rearmost ray in each fin is clearly more robust than the others. The overall colour is greyish pink, darker dorsally and paler ventrally, with a darker head which is darkest in the space between the eyes. There is a reddish black spot at the bases of the pectoral fins. The fins are pale pink with the unpaired fins sometimes showing brownish-red edges. The inside of the mouth is orange. The axillary seabream has a maximum published total length of 36 cm (14 in), although 25 cm (9.8 in) is more typical.

== Distribution and habitat ==
Pagellus acarne is found in the eastern Atlantic Ocean from the British Isles and Denmark, where it is rare in both regions, south through the Bay of Biscay and Atlantic coast of Iberia to Senegal, including Madeira, Canary Islands, Azores and Cape Verde. It also occurs throughout the Mediterranean Sea and Sea of Marmara but is absent from the Black Sea. This demersal species occurs at depths between 0 and 500 m (0 and 1,640 ft), commonest between 40 and 100 m (130 and 330 ft), on a variety of substrates and in seagrass beds.

== Biology ==
Pagellus acarne is a carnivorous species, a study in the Gulf of Tunis found that these fishes preyed on 36 species of prey, mainly crustaceans, molluscs and echinoderms. The diet varied seasonally and adults preyed on a greater variety of prey than juveniles. Another study in the Aegean Sea also found that this species is a carnivore with a varied diet but here copepods, decapods and polychaetes were the most important components of the diet. Off the coast of Egypt the diet of this specuies was dominated by crustaceans, bony fishes and echinoderms with cephalopods and polychaetes being less important components of the diet. Smaller fishes preyed mainly on echinoderms and crustaceans, while fish with lengths between 15 and 18 cm (5.9 and 7.1 in) had diet dominated by shrimp, Squilla mantis shrimp and bony fishes. Fish with length greater than 18 cm (7.1 in) preyed largely on cephalopods, shrimp and bony fishes. The diet varied seasonally here too with crustaceans eaten all year but being more important during the summer while bony fish were the most important prey in autumn and winter. This is thought to be a result of seasonal availability of prey.

The axillary seabream is protandrous, 50% of males in Oran had reached sexual maturity at a length of 16 cm (6.3 in) while for females this was 12.8 cm (5.0 in). However, at lengths greater than 20.5 cm (8.1 in) females predominated and the overall sex ratio in this study was 1 male for evert 1.27 females, This population spawned twice a year in April to June, with a peak in May, and from November to January, peaking in December. Off southern Portugal spawning took place over a more extended period, starting in from May and ending in November. Here the lengths at first maturity were 18.1 cm (7.1 in) for males and 17.6 cm (6.9 in) for females.

== Fisheries ==
Pagellus acarne is an important species in commercial fisheries throughout its range. In the Algarve, Azores and Canary Islands it is the main target species for small-scale commercial fisheries. It is also regarded as a highly value resource in the Mediterranean. In Andalucia, the stocks of axillary seabreams in the Alboran Sea are targeted by multi-species fisheries, both bottom-trawl and artisanal fleets being involved. It is regarded as the most economically important demersal fish in this fishery in terms of both monetary value and volume landed. As well as being sold as a food fish the catch is also used to make fish meal and fish oil.
