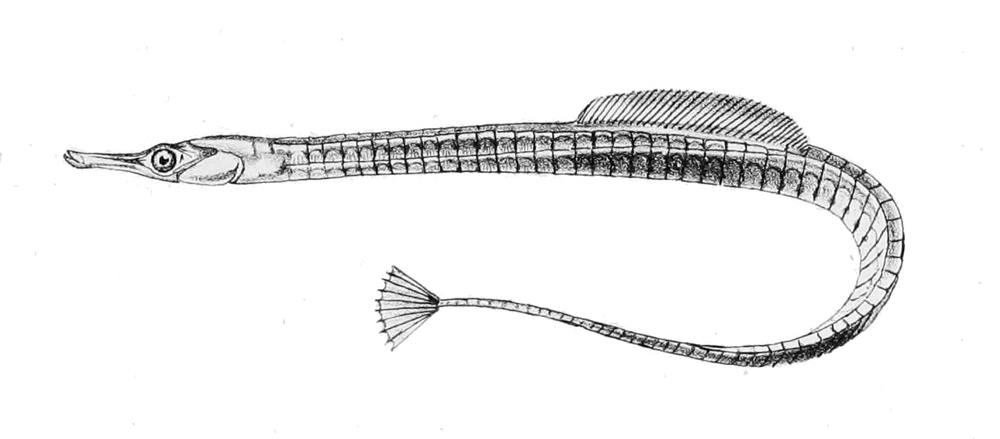

Conservation status
- Least Concern (IUCN 3.1)

Scientific classification
- Kingdom: Animalia
- Phylum: Chordata
- Class: Actinopterygii
- Order: Syngnathiformes
- Family: Syngnathidae
- Genus: Syngnathus
- Species: S. rostellatus

Binomial name
- Syngnathus rostellatus Nilsson, 1855

Synonyms
- Syngnathus dumerilii Duméril, 1870

= Lesser pipefish =

Species of fish

The lesser pipefish or Nilsson's pipefish (Syngnathus rostellatus) is a pipefish similar to the greater pipefish, but with no crest above the head. Usually it reaches up to 17 centimetres (6.7 in) in length, maximally 18 centimetres (7.1 in), although in South Wales they are usually not more than 10 to 13 centimetres (3.9 to 5.1 in) long. They have a light to dark green-brown color with bar-like markings on the sides (similar to the greater pipefish).

== Description ==
The head has a long, thin, round snout with a small up-turned mouth; the eyes are small and situated well back towards the gill covers. The body is long and thin, covered with bony plates; the dorsal fin situates halfway along the body, and pelvic fins are found below this. The caudal fin is shaped like a fan, and small pectoral fins are situated behind the gills. The lesser and greater pipefish species differ because one has a crest on the head while one doesn't. However, they are still quite similar: a fully grown lesser pipefish and a young greater pipefish share similar coloration and markings, they both have a caudal fin, and they swim in a similar style. One distinguishing feature of the lesser pipefish is a continuous black line from the gills down the belly to the tail, although this is not very apparent on very young specimens.

== Distribution ==
The lesser pipefish is found in the eastern Atlantic, from Norway, the British Isles, the Bay of Biscay, and western Portugal. There is one record as well in the Mediterranean Sea, off Malaga, Spain, dating from 1981; reports from the eastern Mediterranean have proven to be misidentifications.

== Habits ==
The lesser pipefish feeds on small crustaceans, and makes its habitat in shallow water. In aquariums, this species should be kept at a temperature no more than 18 °C (64 °F) and needs to be fed on live food. Breeding takes place in spring and summer. The adult male carries the eggs and young in a brood pouch until they are able enough to fend for themselves. They can carry about 100 eggs. The young will hatch after about three weeks and are pelagic.

== Translations ==
The lesser pipefish is known as liten kantnål in Norwegian, mindre kantnål in Swedish, lille tangnål in Danish and Kleine Seenadel in German.
