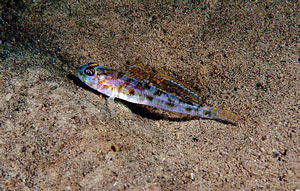

Conservation status
- Least Concern (IUCN 3.1)

Scientific classification
- Domain: Eukaryota
- Kingdom: Animalia
- Phylum: Chordata
- Class: Actinopterygii
- Order: Gobiiformes
- Family: Gobiidae
- Genus: Lesueurigobius
- Species: L. friesii

Binomial name
- Lesueurigobius friesii (Malm, 1874)

Synonyms
- Gobius friesii Malm, 1874; Gobius friesii friesii Malm, 1874; Lesueuria friesii (Malm, 1874); Lesueurigobius friesii friesii (Malm, 1874); Gobius gracilis Fries, 1838; Gobius macrolepis Scharff, 1891

= Fries's goby =

Species of fish

Fries's goby (Lesueurigobius friesii) is a species of goby native to the Eastern Atlantic Ocean along the coasts of Europe and northern Africa as well as the Mediterranean Sea to the Sea of Marmara. This species burrows into muddy or muddy sand substrates at depths of from 10 to 130 metres (33 to 427 ft) and is frequently found in association with the Norway lobster Nephrops norvegicus. This species can reach a length of 13 centimetres (5.1 in) TL. The specific name honours the Swedish zoologist Bengt Fredrik Fries (1799–1839).
