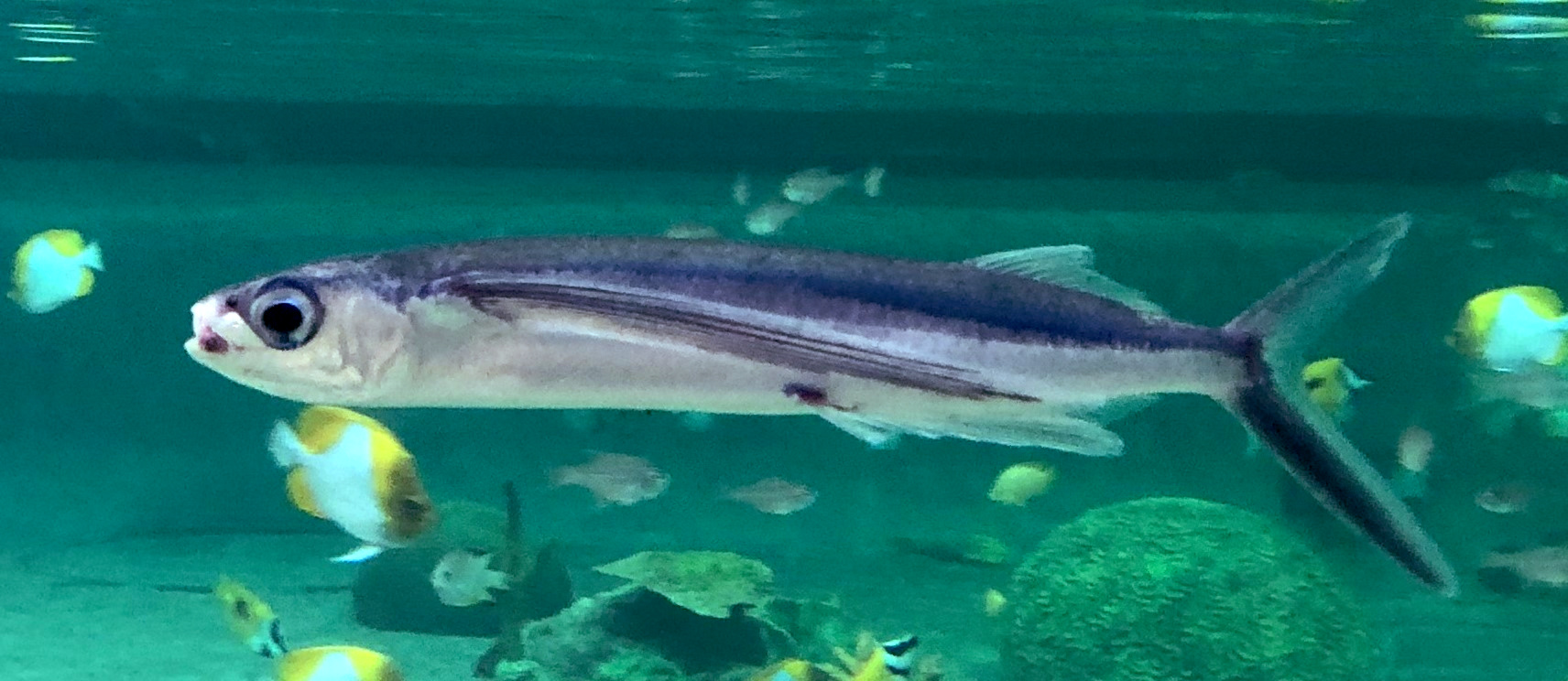
- Adult
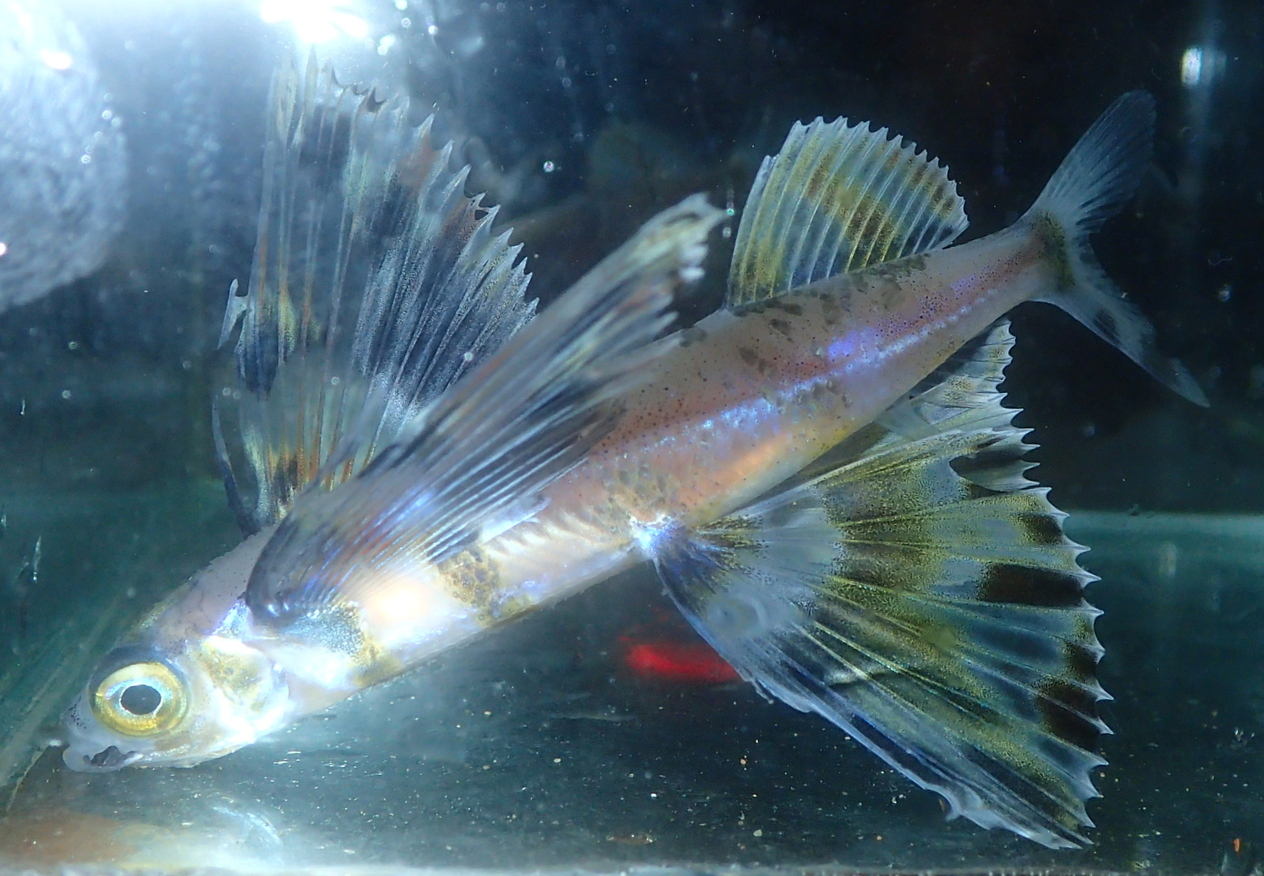
- Juvenile

Scientific classification
- Kingdom: Animalia
- Phylum: Chordata
- Class: Actinopterygii
- Division: Teleostei
- Order: Beloniformes
- Family: Exocoetidae
- Genus: Cheilopogon
- Species: C. heterurus

Binomial name
- Cheilopogon heterurus (Rafinesque, 1810)
- Range

Synonyms
- Cheilopogon heterurus heterurus (Rafinesque, 1810); Cypselurus heterurus (Rafinesque, 1810); Exocetus procne De Filippi & Verany, 1857; Exocoetus heterurus Rafinesque, 1810; Exocoetus maculipinnis Vinciguerra, 1883; Exocoetus procne De Filippi & Verany, 1857

= Cheilopogon heterurus =

Species of fish

Cheilopogon heterurus, the Mediterranean flyingfish, is a fish in the flying fish family Exocoetidae.

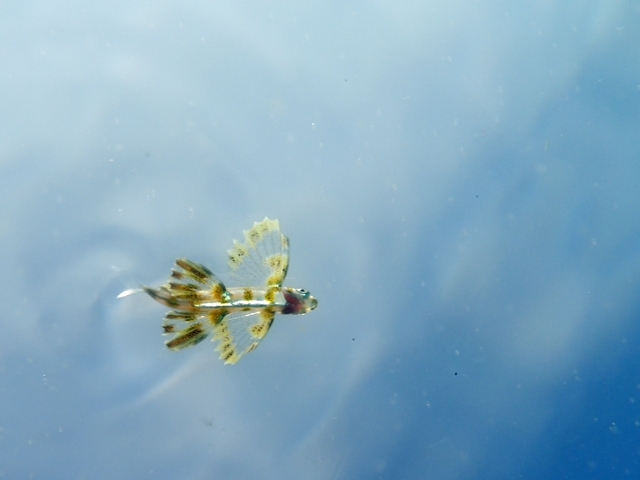
Juvenile
