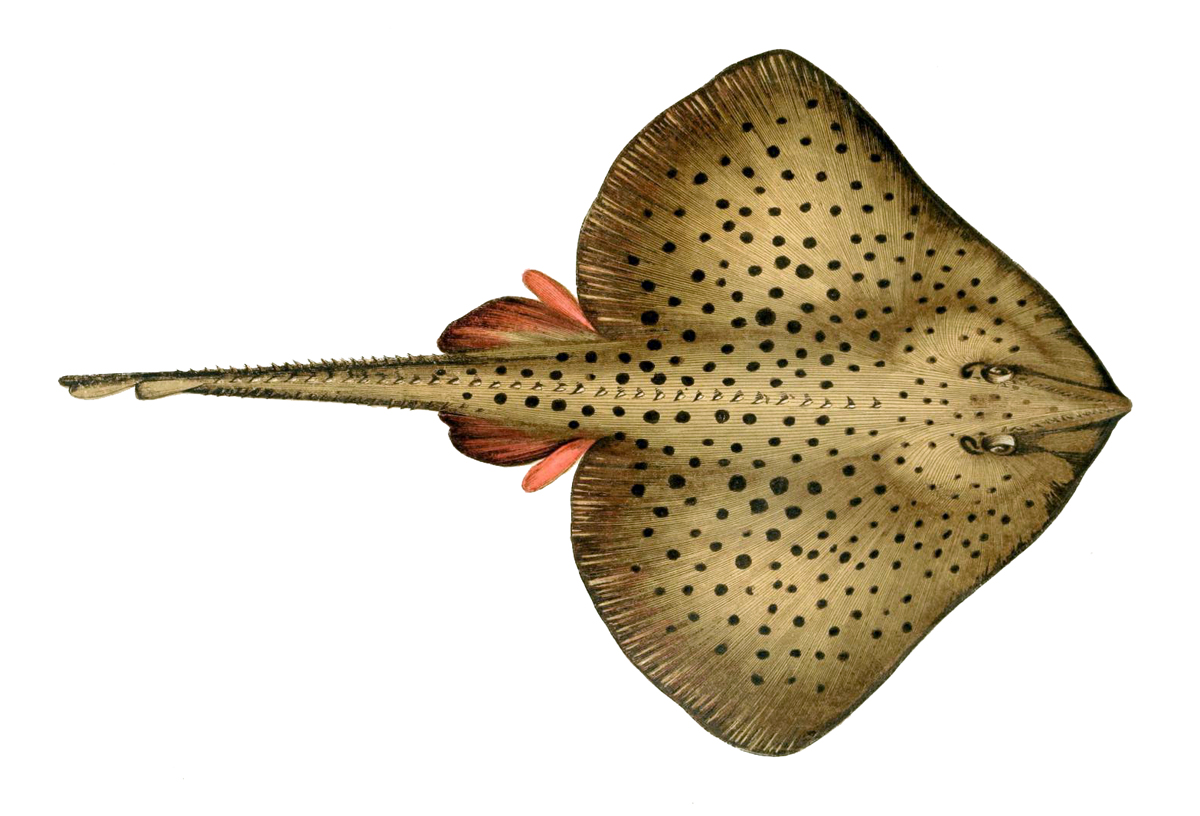

Conservation status
- Least Concern (IUCN 3.1)

Scientific classification
- Kingdom: Animalia
- Phylum: Chordata
- Class: Chondrichthyes
- Subclass: Elasmobranchii
- Order: Rajiformes
- Family: Rajidae
- Genus: Raja
- Species: R. montagui

Binomial name
- Raja montagui Fowler, 1910

Synonyms
- Raia maculata Montagu, 1818

= Spotted ray =

Species of cartilaginous fish

The spotted ray or spotted skate (Raja montagui) is a species of skate in the family Rajidae.

== Distribution ==
The Spotted ray is found in the Atlantic Ocean from the Irish Sea to Morocco, and in the Mediterranean as well. It occurs on continental shelves between a depth of 8–650 metres (26–2,133 ft), and potentially as deep as 800 metres (2,600 ft). It lives over seabeds with soft substrates.

== Description ==
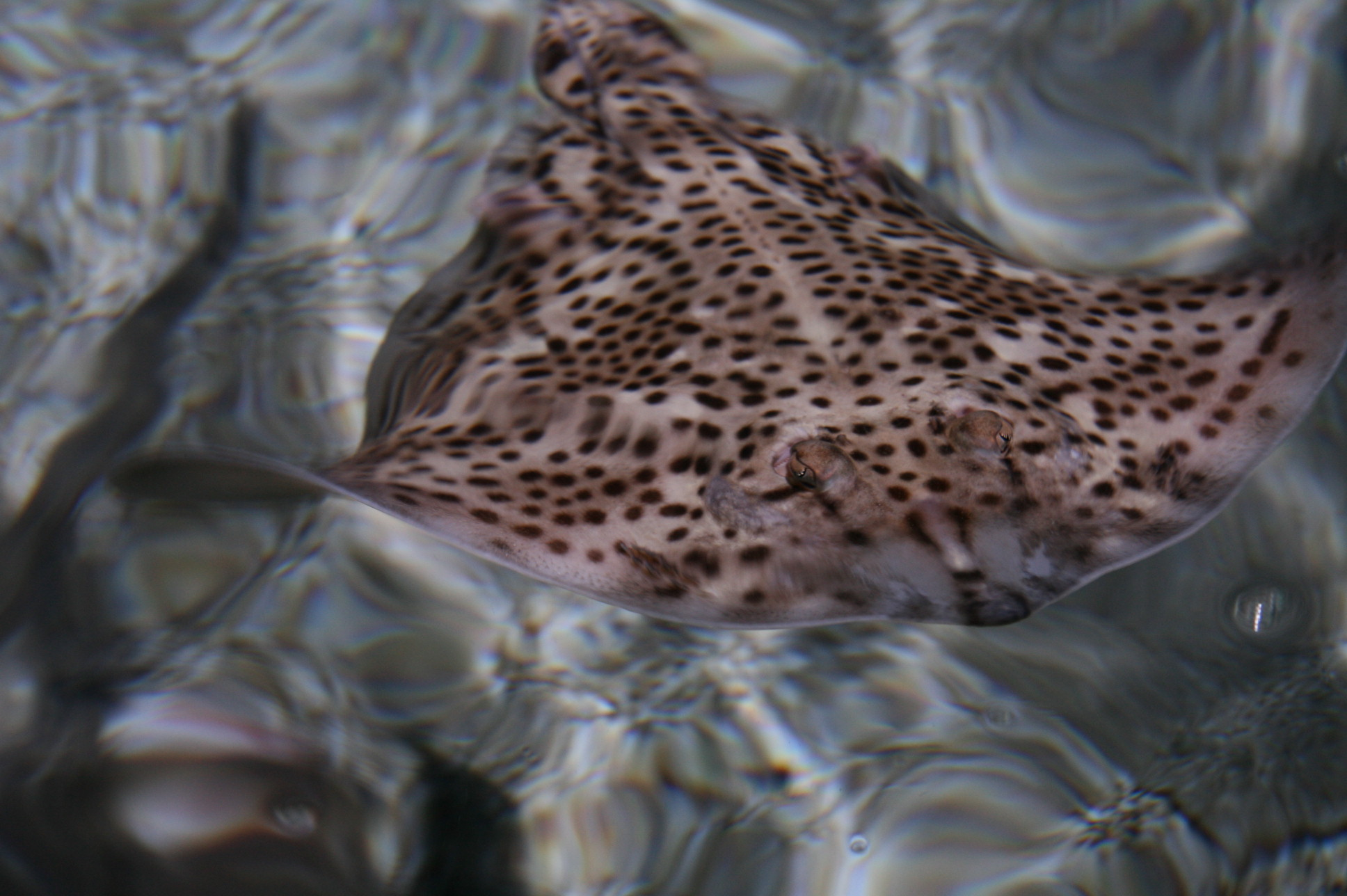
Photograph

Like all rays, the spotted ray has a flattened body with broad, wing-like pectoral fins. The body is sub-rhomboid. The dorsum is brown with dark spots which do not extend to the edges of the fins. The spotted ray has a dorsal surface which for juveniles is smooth and which becomes prickly as it grows. The ventral surface is smooth, apart from the gill, abdominal, and anterior disc margin areas. It is coloured white with greyish margins. There are 1-2 interdorsal thorns, and adult males have both alar and malar thorns. The snout is moderately long and it has a slightly pronounced tip. The upper and lower jaws have 38-60 rows.

Its maximum length is 80 cm (2.6 ft), making it one of the smallest skates.

== Behaviour ==
The spotted ray buries itself in sand to ambush prey and avoid predators. It mainly feeds on crustaceans, polychaetes, teleosts and molluscs.

== Life cycle ==
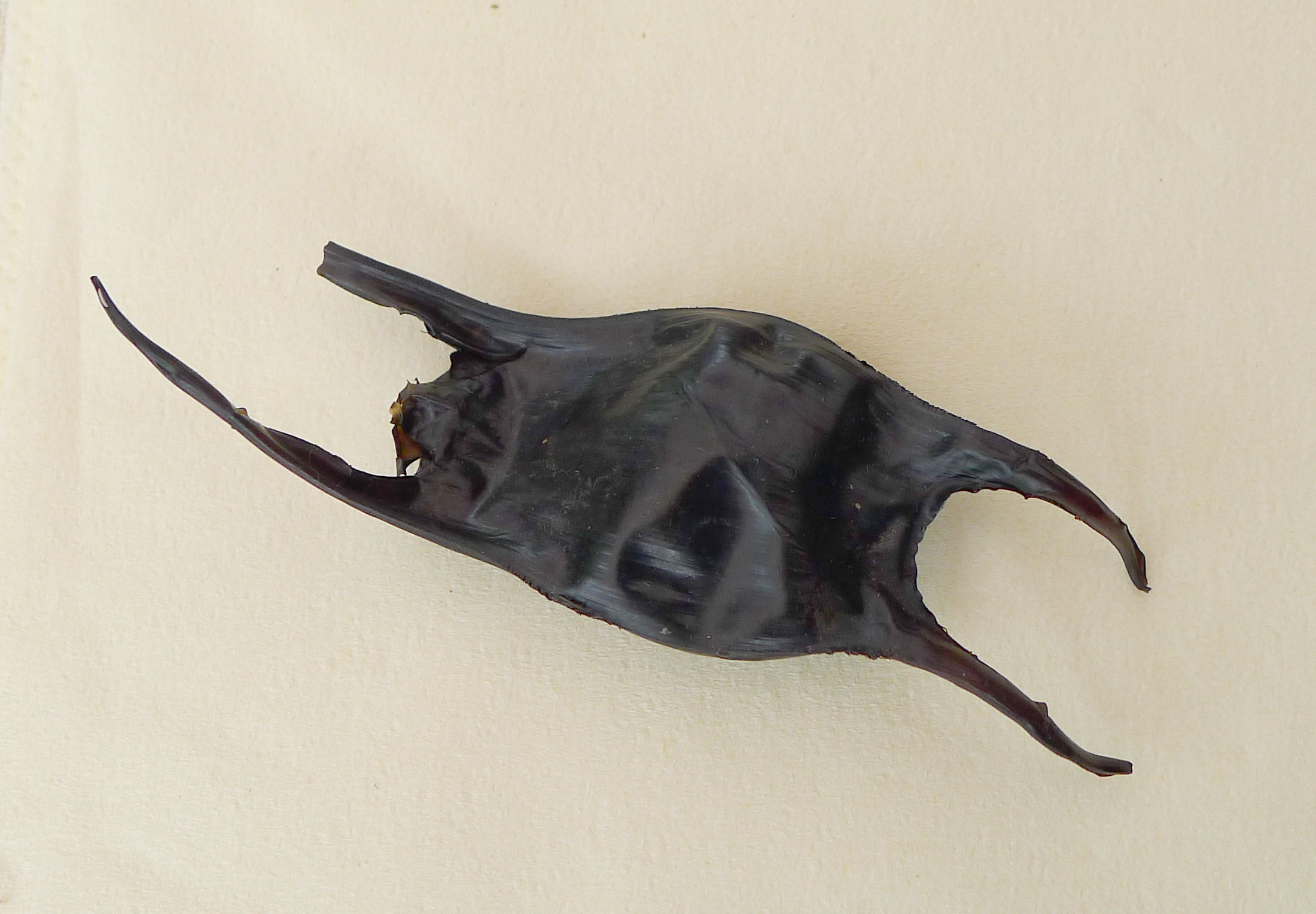
Spotted ray egg case

Spotted rays are oviparous with egg cases laid in summer. The pups hatch fully formed, about 11.5 cm (4.5 in) long, after 5 or 6 months. Females lay 60-70 egg cases, which measure 5–8 centimetres (2.0–3.1 in) in length and 3–5 centimetres (1.2–2.0 in) wide.

== See also ==
- Fish of the Atlantic Ocean
- Fish of the Mediterranean Sea
