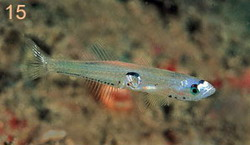

Conservation status
- Least Concern (IUCN 3.1)

Scientific classification
- Kingdom: Animalia
- Phylum: Chordata
- Class: Actinopterygii
- Order: Gobiiformes
- Family: Oxudercidae
- Genus: Crystallogobius; T. N. Gill, 1863
- Species: C. linearis

Binomial name
- Crystallogobius linearis (Düben, 1845)

Synonyms
- For genus Crystallogobius: Latrunculodes Collett, 1875; For species C. linearis: Gobius linearis Düben, 1845; Gobius nilssonii Düben & Koren, 1846; Crystallogobius nilssonii (Düben & Koren, 1846)

= Crystal goby =

Species of fish

Crystallogobius linearis, the crystal goby, is a species of goby native to the Atlantic coasts of Europe and the Mediterranean Sea where it can be found at depths of from 1 to 400 metres (3.3 to 1,312.3 ft). Males of this species grow to a length of 4.7 centimetres (1.9 in) SL while females only reach 3.9 centimetres (1.5 in) SL. This species is the only known member of its genus. The name Crystallogobius comes from the Latin words cristallum, meaning "crystal", and gobius, meaning gudgeon.

== Distribution ==
Crystal gobies can be found in the Northeastern Atlantic Ocean off the coast of Europe from Norway down to Spain, and even off the mainland on Madeira, Portugal. Additionally, they can be found throughout the Mediterranean off the coast of Europe from Spain to Turkey. They live on the coast and just offshore in water no deeper than 400 metres (1,300 ft).

== Description ==
The Crystal goby gets its name from the glassy, see-through appearance of its body. It was first described by Düben and Koren in 1846. Crystal goby males' first dorsal fins are reduced and they exhibit large caniform teeth. On the other hand, females do not have dorsal fins. Neither males nor females have scales. Crystal gobies have swimbladders and their alimentary canals are rather short and straight. There is sexual dimorphism in this species due to males growing up to 4.7 cm (1.9 in) and females growing up to 3.9 cm (1.5 in). They only live about 1 year as they die after breeding. Additionally, they have 2–3 dorsal spines, 18–20 dorsal soft rays, 1 anal spine, and 20–21 anal soft rays.

== Fishing ==
There is not much data suggesting that this species is fished very much, which most likely has to do with its relatively small size compared to other fished species. However, there is data that shows they were fished in the Ligurian Sea by artisanal fishers using beach-seines from Camogli and Sestri Levante in Italy. Additionally, there is evidence of Crystal gobies being sold in Barcelona, Spain. Although they are caught and sold, they seem to be by-catch and therefore not targeted by the fishing industry.

== Reproduction ==
Crystal gobies are an "annual" species which means that they die after reproducing. The eggs are demersal and can be found in the tubes of polychaetes and serpulids. It has been suggested that spawning occurs between May and September, with the Northeastern Atlantic Crystal gobies spawning before the Mediterranean ones. Crystal gobies are unique because the females can be sexually mature at only 4 months, which is relatively fast for gobies. They are able to reproduce at small body sizes with some larval anatomical features still present. The fact that this species reproduces so young and with some larval features may explain their anatomy.
