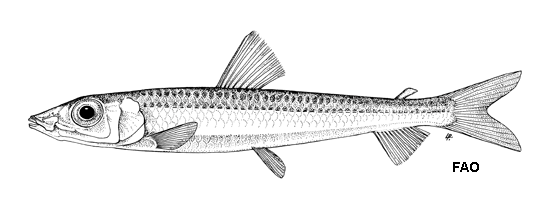

Scientific classification
- Kingdom: Animalia
- Phylum: Chordata
- Class: Actinopterygii
- Division: Teleostei
- Order: Argentiniformes
- Family: Argentinidae
- Genus: Argentina
- Species: A. sphyraena

Binomial name
- Argentina sphyraena Linnaeus, 1758

= Argentina sphyraena =

Species of fish

Argentina sphyraena, the lesser silver smelt or lesser argentine, is a species of fish belonging to the family Argentinidae. A. sphyraena was first described in 1758 by the Swedish naturalist Carl Linnaeus. A pelagic fish found in the northeastern Atlantic, from Norway to Western Sahara, and in the Mediterranean Sea between 50 and 700 m depth. The species generally grows up to 20 cm total length, but 35.5 cm total length is the maximum recorded size. A. sphyraena feeds mostly on invertebrates, including polychaetes, molluscs, and crustaceans. One of the most notable characteristics of the species is that it smells of cucumbers.
