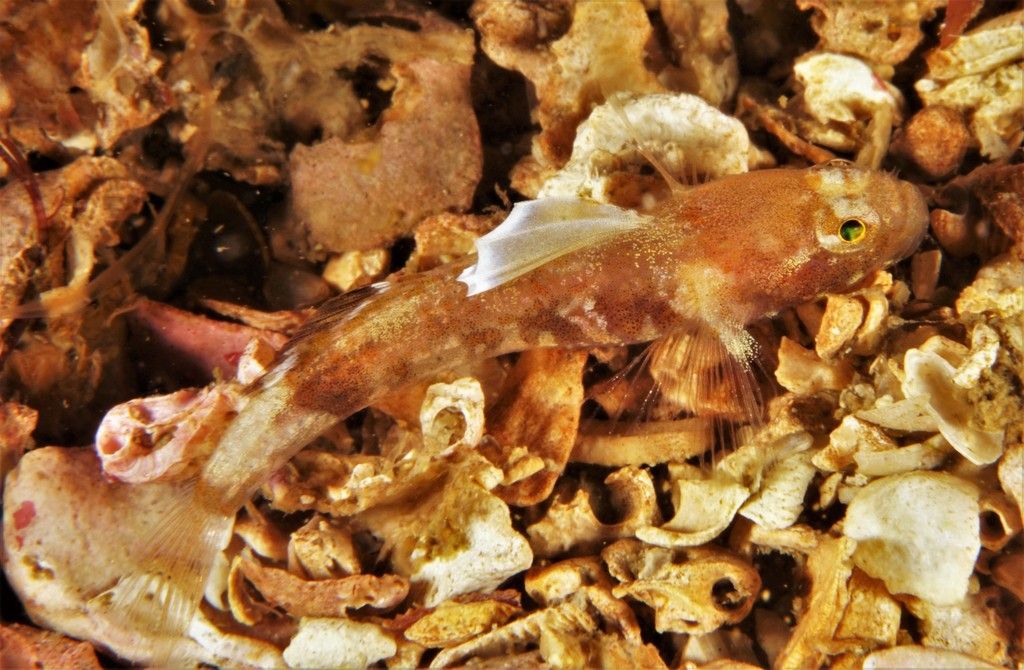

Conservation status
- Least Concern (IUCN 3.1)

Scientific classification
- Kingdom: Animalia
- Phylum: Chordata
- Class: Actinopterygii
- Order: Gobiiformes
- Family: Oxudercidae
- Genus: Lebetus
- Species: L. scorpioides

Binomial name
- Lebetus scorpioides (Collett, 1874)

Synonyms
- Gobius orca Collett, 1874; Gobius scorpioides Collett, 1874; Lebetus orca (Collett, 1874)

= Lebetus scorpioides =

Species of fish

Lebetus scorpioides, commonly known as the Diminutive goby or Scorpion goby, is a species of fish belonging to the family Gobiidae.

It is native to the coasts of the Western Baltic Sea; North Sea; northeastern Atlantic: Iceland and Norway south to Portugal, including Madeira.
