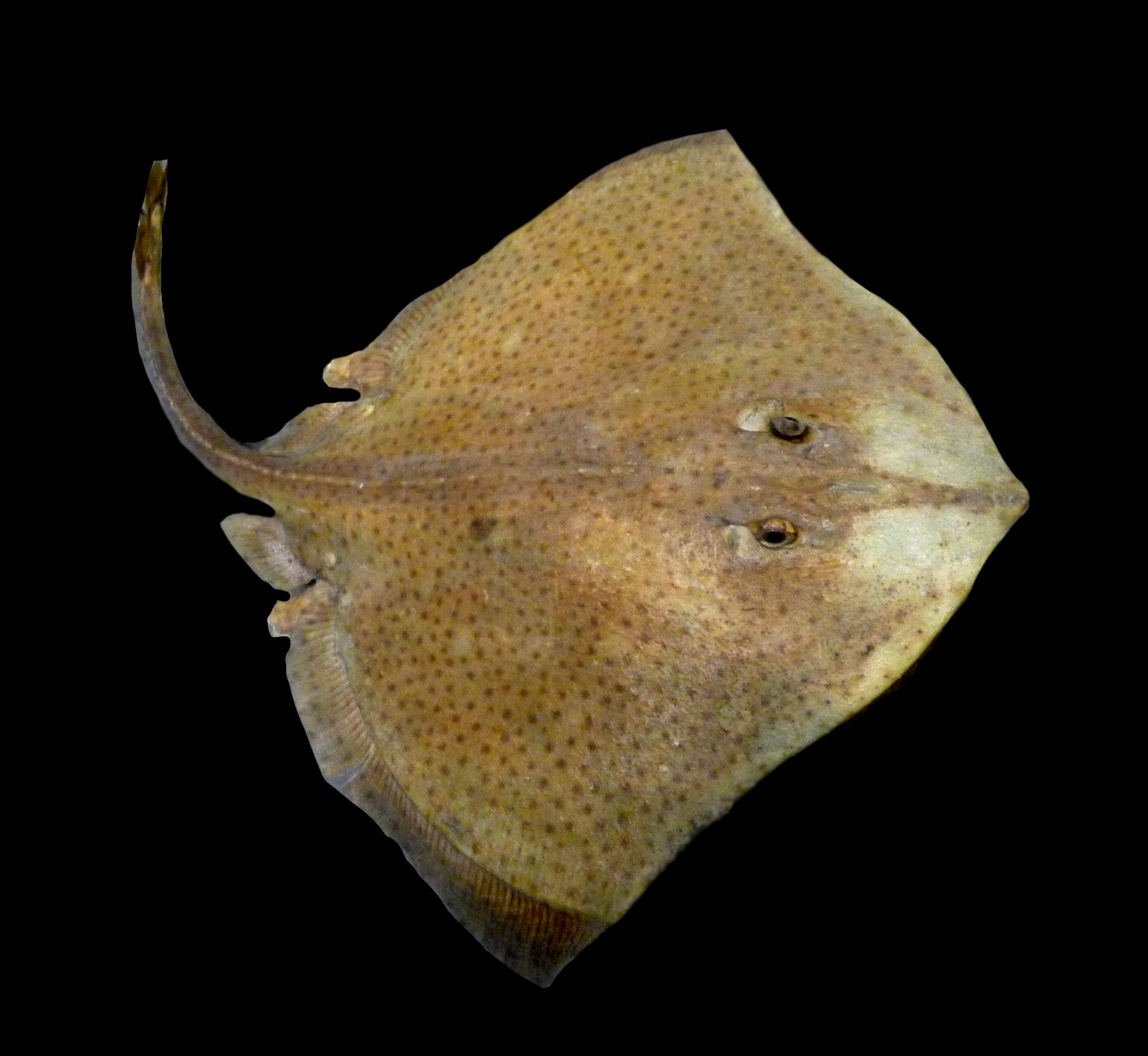

Conservation status
- Near Threatened (IUCN 3.1)

Scientific classification
- Kingdom: Animalia
- Phylum: Chordata
- Class: Chondrichthyes
- Subclass: Elasmobranchii
- Order: Rajiformes
- Family: Rajidae
- Genus: Raja
- Species: R. brachyura

Binomial name
- Raja brachyura Lafont, 1871

Synonyms
- Raia blanda Holt, 1894; Raia brachyura Lafont, 1871; Raja blanda Holt, 1894

= Blonde ray =

Species of cartilaginous fish

The blonde ray or blonde skate (Raja brachyura) is a species of cartilaginous fish in the skate family Rajidae. It is found in the Eastern Atlantic and the Mediterranean.

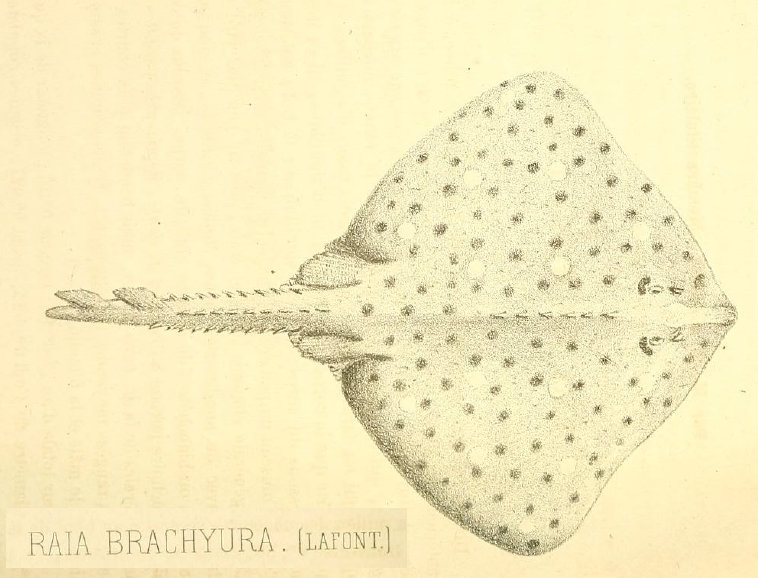
1873 sketch by the describer, A. Lafont

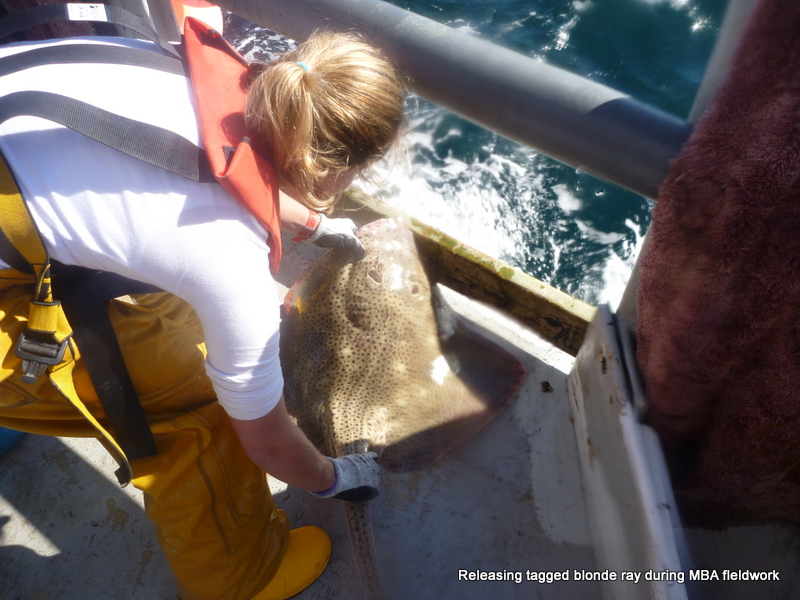
Scientist releasing a tagged blonde ray during fieldwork

== Description ==
Like all rays, the blonde ray has a flattened body with broad, wing-like pectoral fins. The body is kite-shaped with a short tail (hence the specific name brachyura, which is derived from Ancient Greek and means "short tail"). In terms of coloration, it is brown with a few creamy-white blotches and dense dark spots which extend to the edges of the pectoral fins and to the tail. The total length at birth of R brachyura is between 16–18 centimetres (6.3–7.1 in), and they reach maturity at around a total length of 80–90 centimetres (31–35 in). The maximum published length is 120 cm (47 in).

== Distribution ==
The blonde ray is found in the Eastern Atlantic (from Scotland to Morocco) at depths of 10–380 m (33–1,247 ft); it is also found occasionally in the Mediterranean. R brachyura has been infrequently found at depths to 900 metres (3,000 ft).

== Habitat ==
The blonde ray is demersal, preferring areas with sandy and muddy bottoms. Like many other elasmobranch species, the blonde ray uses shallow coastal wasters as nursery areas, leading to a greater number of blonde rays found near shore being juveniles. R brachyura lives in sandy seabed habitats.

== Life cycle ==
The blonde ray is oviparous, with embryos feeding only on yolk. It reaches sexual maturity at 85–92 cm (33–36 in) in length, which corresponds to 8–10 years of age. The clutch size is around 40–140 eggs, and the female tends to her eggs after laying them. The average lifespan of a blonde ray is around 15 years.

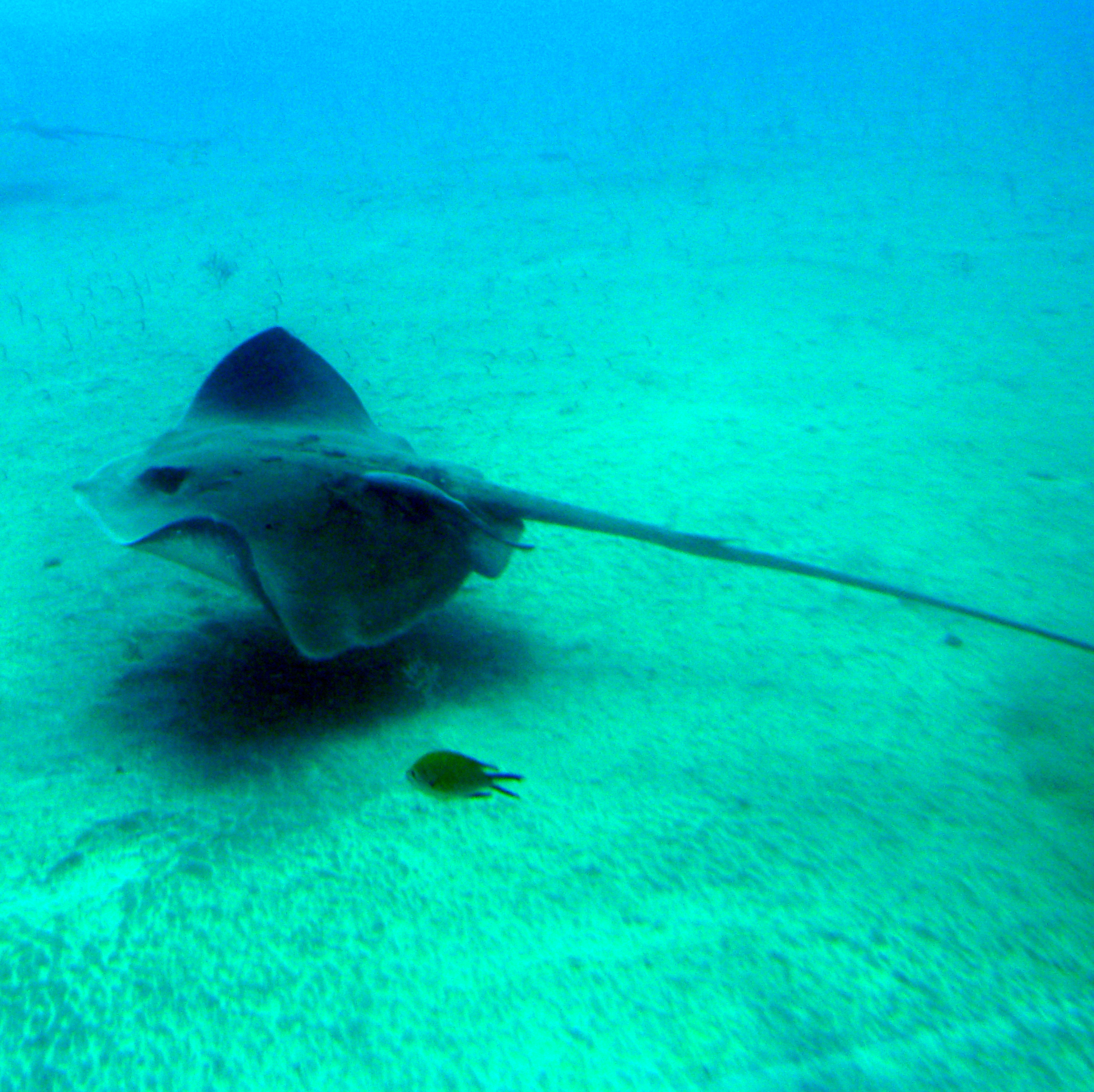
Blonde ray in the wild, swimming near the bottom of shallow water

== Diet ==
The diet of the blonde ray (both as juvenile and adult) consists of cephalopods, small bony fish and crustaceans (such as shrimp, especially the species Crangon crangon).

== Genetic disorders ==
Genetic disorders like leucism and albinism are found to affect the blonde ray. Leucism tends to cause this ray to go from their normal brownish appearance with darker spots to white with black spots, and leucitic individuals tend to be smaller. In albinism, we see a predominately white dorsal side with little to no spots and eye color change. No physical damages or disease was shown to be increased in blonde rays with these genetic disorders.

== Relationship with humans ==
The blonde ray is fished for human consumption (for example in the UK) and for sport, with a record weight of 17 kg (37 lb) recorded in Cobh, Ireland in 2008. Skates in general are often considered vulnerable to overfishing because they are long-lived, slow-growing, late to mature and produce few young, which, coupled with their generally large size, morphology, and aggregating nature, renders them susceptible to capture in many fisheries. The aggregated landings of rays, although variable, have remained relatively stable over the past 60 years. However, human impact still affects the blonde ray. Due to them being commonly found in shallower water, it is easier for them to be caught. As a result, juveniles can be fished before having a chance to breed.

== See also ==
- Fish of the Atlantic Ocean
- Fish of the Mediterranean Sea
