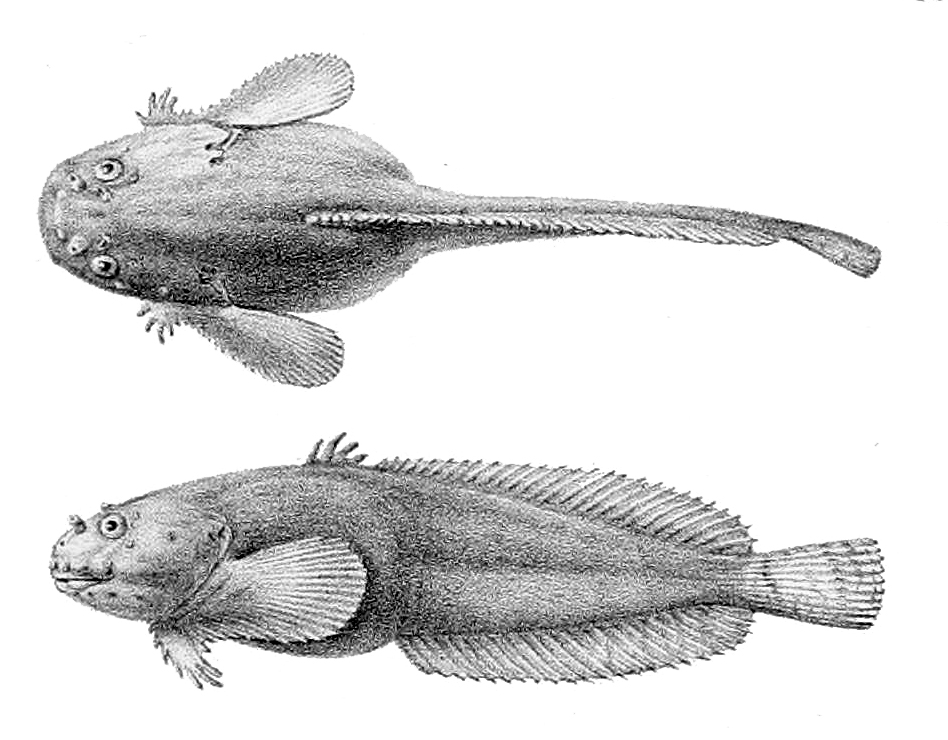

Conservation status
- Least Concern (IUCN 3.1)

Scientific classification
- Kingdom: Animalia
- Phylum: Chordata
- Class: Actinopterygii
- Division: Teleostei
- Order: Perciformes
- Suborder: Cottoidei
- Family: Liparidae
- Genus: Liparis
- Species: L. montagui

Binomial name
- Liparis montagui (Donovan, 1804)

Synonyms
- Cyclopterus montagui Donovan, 1804; Cyclopterus gobius Nilsson, 1832; Liparis ekstromii Malm, 1865; Liparis maculatus Malm, 1865; Liparis montagui annulatus Collett, 1879; Liparis montagui striatus Collett, 1879; Liparis montagui pictus Collett, 1879; Liparis montagui obscurus Collett, 1879; Liparis montagui principalis Collett, 1879

= Liparis montagui =

Species of fish

Liparis montagui, or Montagu's seasnail, is a marine fish of the seasnail family (Liparidae). It inhabits the northeastern Atlantic, mainly around the British Isles, the North Sea, the Norwegian Sea, southern Iceland and as far north as the Barents Sea. It is a small (maximum 12 cm), demersal fish, usually living from the intertidal zone to 30 metres deep, where it hides under stones or algae. It mainly feeds on small invertebrates, such as small crabs, shrimp and amphipods. This species was described in 1804 by the Anglo-Irish writer, natural history illustrator, and amateur zoologist Edward Donovan with England given as the type locality. The specific name honours the English naturalist George Montagu who provided Donovan with an illustration and a description of this "beautiful little fish".
