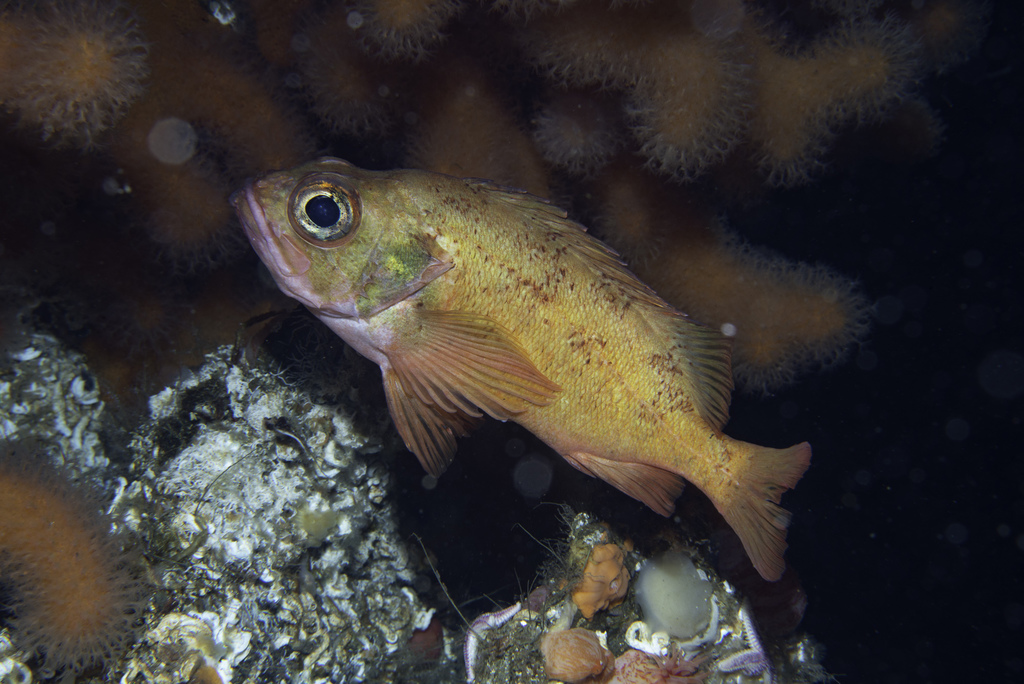

Scientific classification
- Kingdom: Animalia
- Phylum: Chordata
- Class: Actinopterygii
- Order: Perciformes
- Family: Scorpaenidae
- Genus: Sebastes
- Species: S. viviparus

Binomial name
- Sebastes viviparus Krøyer, 1845

Synonyms
- Sebastes marinus viviparus Krøyer, 1844

= Sebastes viviparus =

Species of fish

Sebastes viviparus, the Norway redfish, small redfish, lesser redfish, ocean perch or rosefish, is a species of marine ray-finned fish belonging to the subfamily Sebastinae, the rockfishes, part of the family Scorpaenidae. It is found in the northern Atlantic Ocean.

== Taxonomy ==
Sebastes viviparus was first formally described in 1845 by the Danish zoologist Henrik Nikolai Krøyer, although he had described it in 1844 as a subspecies of Sebastes marinus but this taxon is thought to be a synonym of Serranus scriba, with the type locality given as Norway. It is classified within the subgenus Sebastes. The specific name viviparus means "live bearing".

== Description ==
Sebastes viviparus is a relatively small species of rockfish with a maximum recorded total length of 65 cm (26 in), although 25 cm (9.8 in) is more typical, and a maximum published weight of 1.0 kg (2.2 lb). The dorsal fin has 14-16 spines and 12–15, normally mostly 13–14, soft rays and the anal fin with 3 spines and 6-8 soft rays. The eyes are large while the protrusible, oblique mouth is moderately large and is positioned terminally. There are several large spines on the head and body. The large fan-like pectoral fin has a broad base and the caudal fin is truncate. The colour is pale red with three clear blotches on the back along the base of the dorsal fin.

== Distribution and habitat ==
Sebastes viviparus is found in the northeast Atlantic. It occurs along the Norwegian coast from the Kattegat north to Tanafjord in Finnmark. It is rare off Bear Island. It is also found around the Great Britain and Ireland from the Shetland Island southwards but it is rare in the English Channel. It has been recorded from Rockall Bank, it is common around the Faroes and Iceland but it is erratic in its occurrences off East Greenland. It is a demersal fish which is found at depths of 50 to 300 m (160 to 980 ft). It typically occurs on rocky substartes close to shore.

== Biology ==
Sebastes viviparus is found in shoals that move closer to the coast during the summer. Their diet is made up of various small crustaceans and young fishes. They are ovoviviparous, like all rockfishes.

== Fisheries ==
Sebastes viviparus is generally considered too small to be a target for commercial fisheries, although there is a small fishery in Iceland. It is vulnerable to overfishing due to the low growth rate of population.
