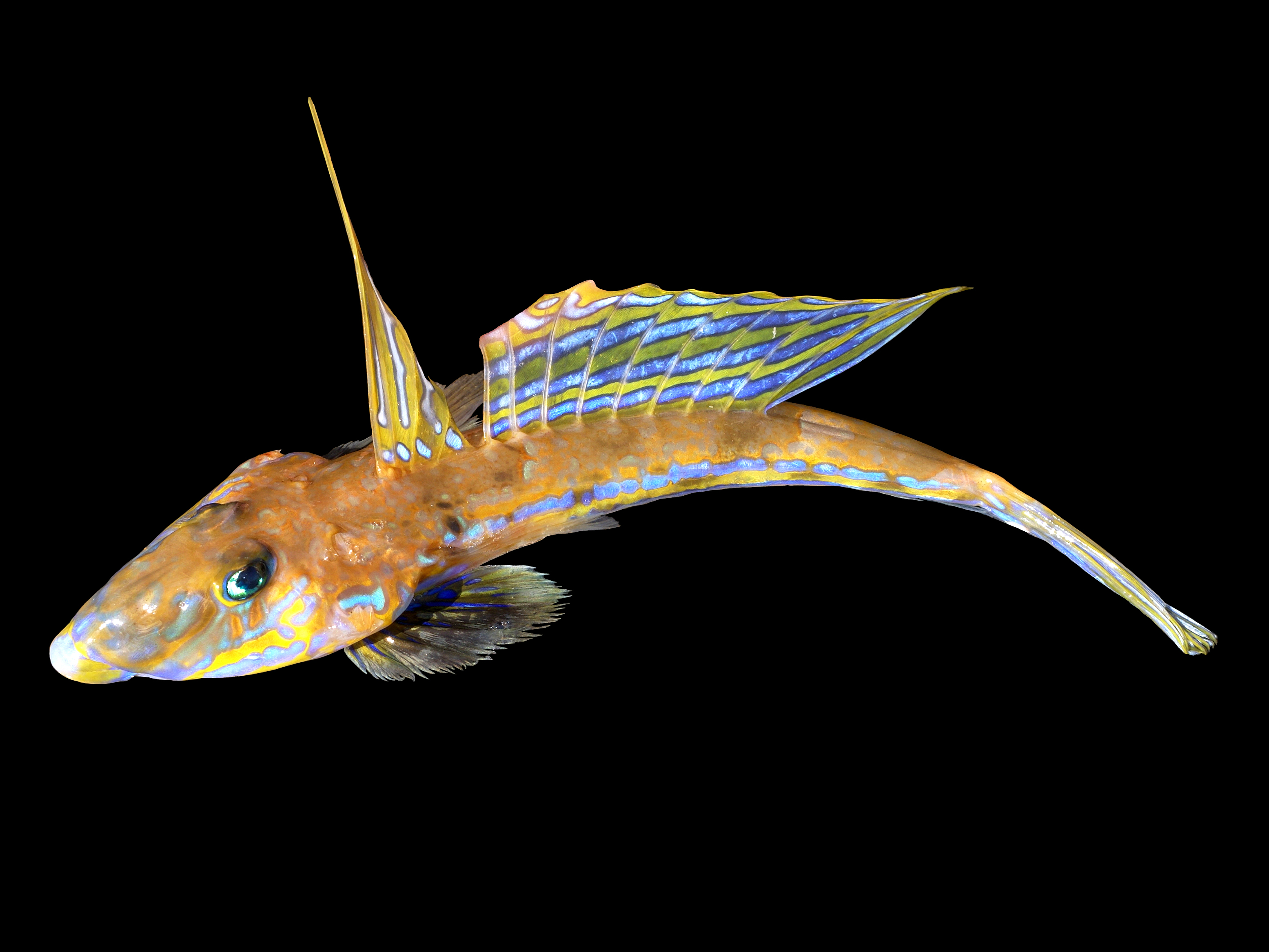
- Male
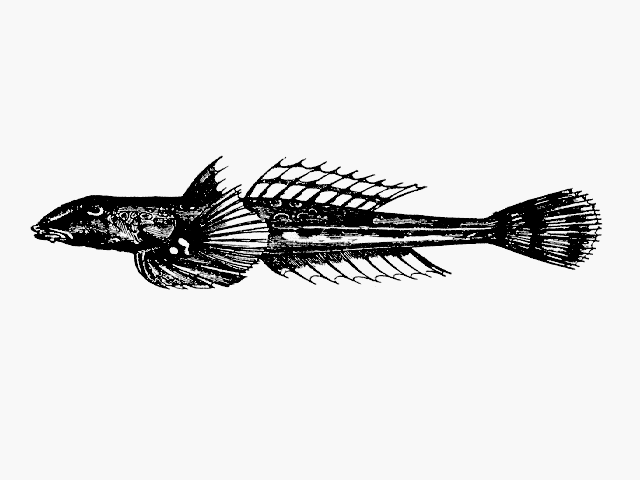
- Drawing of a female

Conservation status
- Least Concern (IUCN 3.1)

Scientific classification
- Kingdom: Animalia
- Phylum: Chordata
- Class: Actinopterygii
- Order: Syngnathiformes
- Family: Callionymidae
- Genus: Callionymus
- Species: C. lyra

Binomial name
- Callionymus lyra Linnaeus, 1758

Synonyms
- Callionymus dracunculus Linnaeus, 1758; Callionymus elegans Lesueur, 1814; Callionymus sueurii Valenciennes, 1837; Uranoscopus micropterygius Gronow, 1854

= Common dragonet =

Species of fish

The common dragonet (Callionymus lyra) is a species of dragonet which is widely distributed in the eastern North Atlantic where it is common near Europe from Norway and Iceland southwards. It is a demersal species that occurs over sand bottoms. It lives to a maximum age of around seven years. It is caught in bycatch by fisheries and is used in the aquarium trade.

== Description ==
The common dragonet has a broad, triangular, flattened head with a long snout and protruding lower jaw, the body is also flattened, although the tail is rounded. The eyes are placed on the top head and the gills are also on the upper part of the body. The preopercular bone is strongly hooked and has four robust spines, the front facing forwards and the other three face rearwards. The adults are sexually dimorphic and the mature males have elongate rays in their dorsal and caudal fins. The second dorsal fin is yellowish with bright blue longitudinal stripes and they have bright blue marks on the head and body. The females and immature males are brown, paler on the underside, with a series of 6 brown blotches along their flanks. There are three symmetrical brown saddle-like blotches along the back with indistinct darker longitudinal stripes on their second dorsal fin. The females are normally smaller than the males with an average total length of 20 centimetres (7.9 in) long and the larger males grow up to 30 centimetres (12 in). Their colour and patterning mean that common dragonets are well camouflaged on coarse sand or gravel substrates. When the common dragonet is at rest on the seabed its fins are often folded.

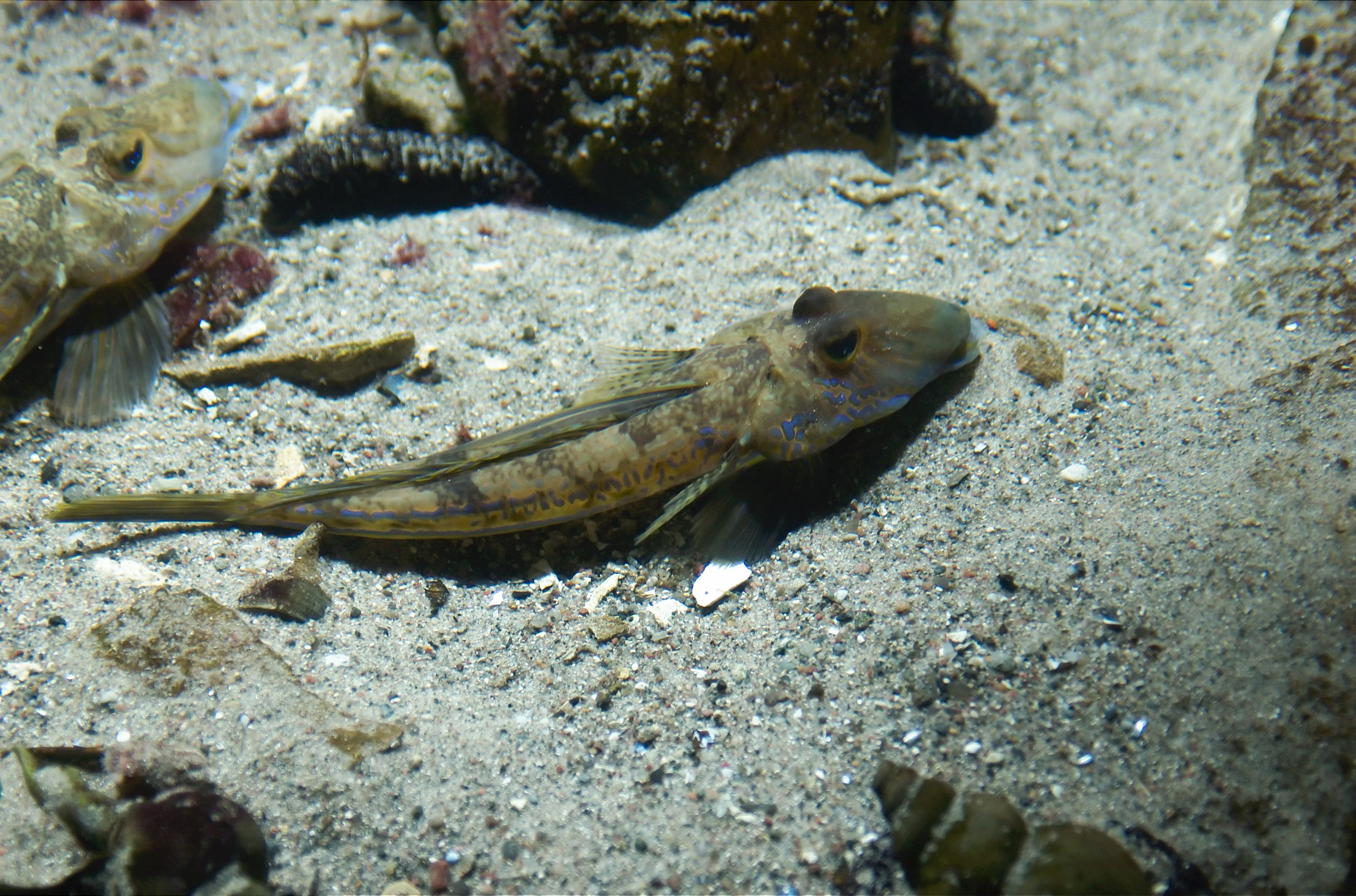

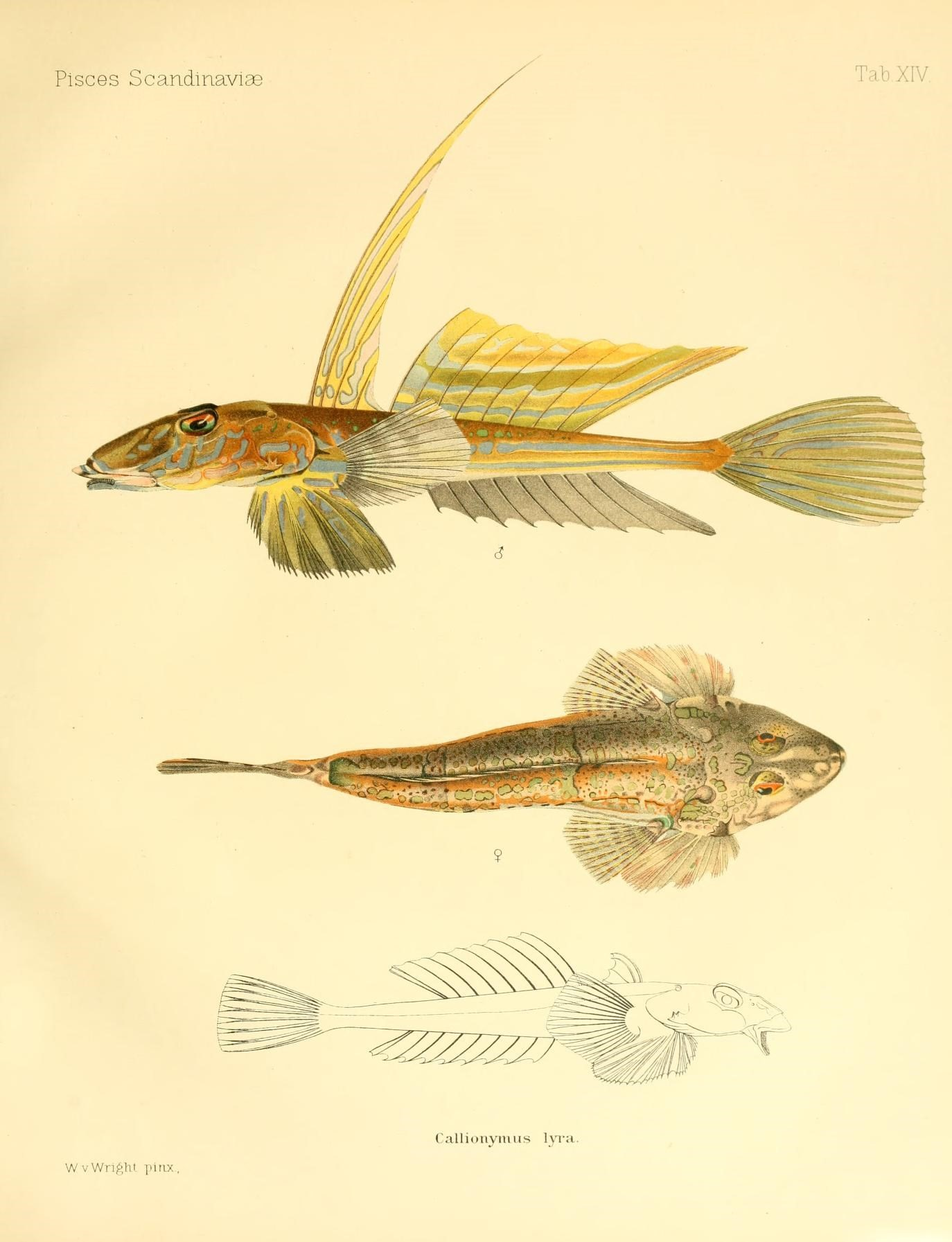
Illustration of C. lyra.

== Distribution ==
The common dragonet is found in inshore waters in the eastern North Atlantic from Iceland and Norway in the north through the western coasts of Europe to Mauritania, as well as the islands groups of the Faroes, the British Isles, the Canary Islands, Madeira and the Azores. It also occurs throughout the Mediterranean Sea and the Black Sea.

== Habitat and biology ==
The common dragonet is a demersal species which is occurs from the sublittoral zone to depths of up to 430 metres (1,410 ft), although it is most frequently found between 5 metres (16 ft) and 50 metres (160 ft). It is found in temperate waters with a water temperature of 16–20 °C (61–68 °F). It spends most of its time on the seabed partially buried in sand or shell gravel. When it is buried in the substrate only the head and eyes will protrude and the fish may emerge quickly to feed. They are opportunistic feeders which will prey on whichever suitable prey species are most abundant, it feeds mostly on small invertebrates, such as worms and crustaceans, for example in one study crustaceans were found to make up over 85% of the identifiable diet with the porcelain crab Pisidia longicornis making up 43%. Molluscs, especially cockles, are also preyed upon by common dragonets. Common dragonets are an important prey item of Atlantic cod and pouting in the Irish Sea.

Male common dragonets are territorial and they aggressively defend their territories from other males. Unlike many species of pelagic spawning fish the common dragonet spawns as a pair. They have quite an elaborate courtship in which the male approaches the female, spreading his pectoral fins and erecting both dorsal fins, displaying their colours, while simultaneously repeatedly raising his head and opening his mouth very wide. If the female responds to this display the male becomes more excited and eventually the pair swim, with the female resting on the pectoral fins of the male, vertically to the surface where the eggs and milt are released between their bodies to be fertilised. After fertilisation the eggs drift away in the current. The eggs, larvae and postlarvae of common dragonets are pelagic while the juveniles prefer the intertidal zone.

== Human uses ==
This species is of minor importance to local commercial fisheries and can be found displayed in public aquariums.
