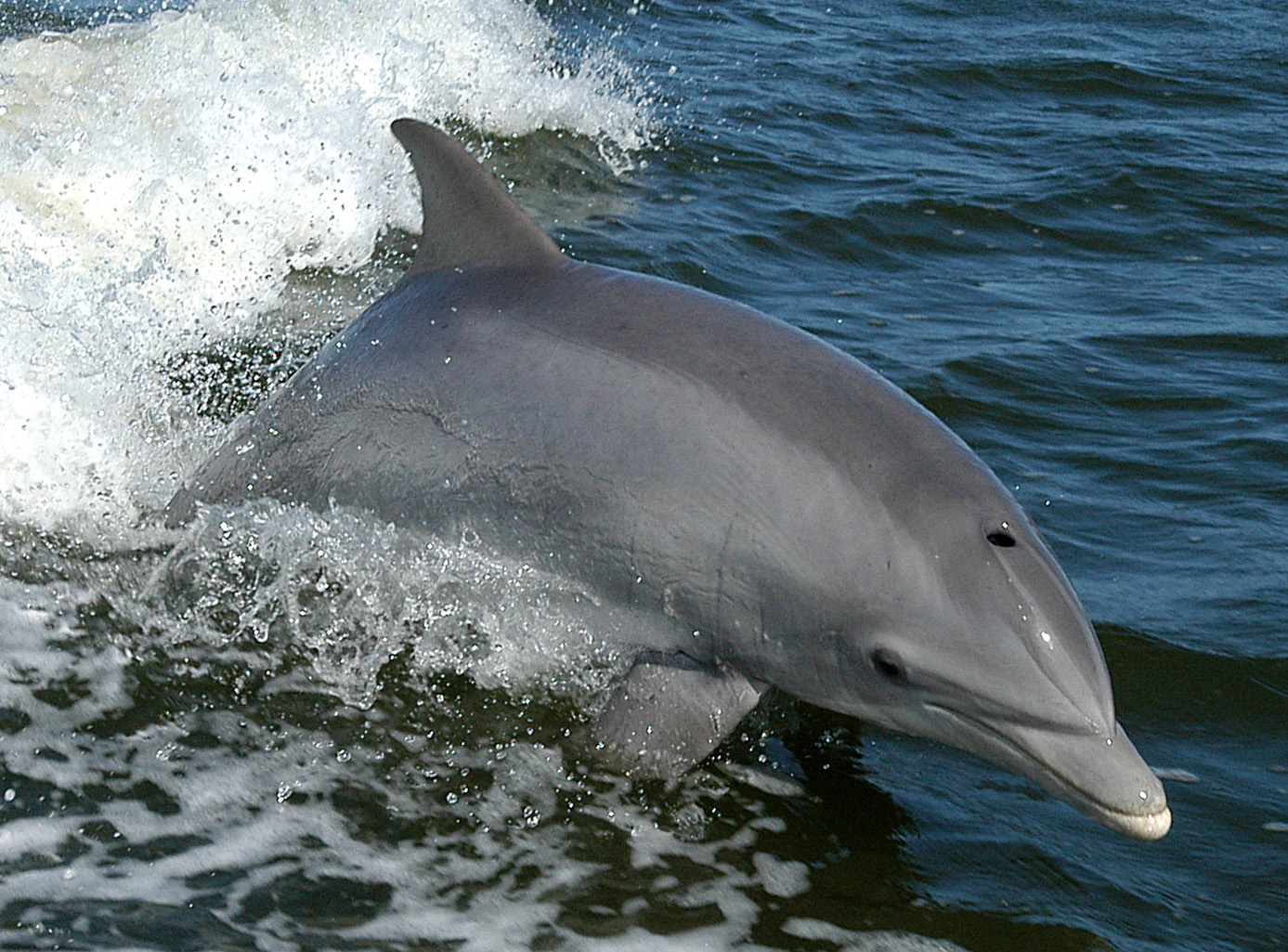
- Common bottlenose dolphin breaching surfing a boat wake, a frequently seen activity in high traffic areas
- Size compared to an average human

Conservation status
- Least Concern (IUCN 3.1)
- CITES Appendix II

Scientific classification
- Kingdom: Animalia
- Phylum: Chordata
- Class: Mammalia
- Infraclass: Placentalia
- Order: Artiodactyla
- Infraorder: Cetacea
- Family: Delphinidae
- Genus: Tursiops
- Species: T. truncatus

Binomial name
- Tursiops truncatus (Montagu, 1821)

Subspecies
- T. t. truncatus; T. t. ponticus; T. t. gephyreus; T. t. nuuanu
- Common bottlenose dolphin range (in blue)

Synonyms
- List: Delphinus tursio Gunnerus, 1768; Tursiops tursio Bonnaterre, 1789; Delphinus nesarnack Lacépède, 1804; Delphinus truncatus Montagu, 1821; Phocoena compressicauda Lesson, 1828; Delphinus catalania Gray, 1844; Tursiops communis Fitzing, 1846; Delphinus compressicauda Gray, 1846; Delphinus cymodoce Gray, 1846; Delphinus eurynome Gray, 1846; Delphinus metis Gray, 1846; Tursiops eurynome Gray, 1846; Delphinus erebennus Cope, 1865; Tursio catalania Gray, 1866; Tursio cymodoce Gray, 1866; Tursio eurynome Gray, 1866; Tursio metis Gray, 1866; Tursio truncatus Gray, 1866; Tursio compressicauda Gray, 1866; Tursiops parvimanus Van Beneden, 1886; Tursiops coerulescens Giglioli, 1889; Tursiops compressicauda Trouessart, 1898; Tursiops gephyreus Lahille, 1908; Tursiops dawsoni Lydekker, 1909; Tursiops nuuanu Andrews, 1911; Tursiops maugeanus Iredale & Troughton, 1934; Tursiops ponticus Barabash-Nikiforov, 1940

= Common bottlenose dolphin =

Species of dolphin

The common bottlenose dolphin or Atlantic bottlenose dolphin (Tursiops truncatus) is one of three species of bottlenose dolphin in the genus Tursiops. While formerly known simply as the bottlenose dolphin, this term is now applied to the genus Tursiops as a whole. As considerable genetic variation has been described within this species, even between neighboring populations, many experts think additional species may be recognized and split out.

The common bottlenose dolphin is a very familiar dolphin due to the wide exposure it receives in captivity in marine parks and dolphinariums, and in movies and television programs. Common bottlenose dolphins inhabit temperate and tropical oceans throughout the world, absent only from polar waters.

== Description ==
Common bottlenose dolphins have a grey coloration, a short beak, a single blowhole, and a hooked dorsal fin. The bottlenose is between 2 and 4 m (6.6 and 13.1 ft) long, and weighs between 150 and 650 kg (330 and 1,430 lb). Males are generally larger and heavier than females. In most parts of the world, adult length is between 2.5 and 3.5 m (8.2 and 11.5 ft); weight ranges between 200 and 500 kg (440 and 1,100 lb). Like the other bottlenose dolphins, they have a short and well-defined snout, which is the source for their common name.

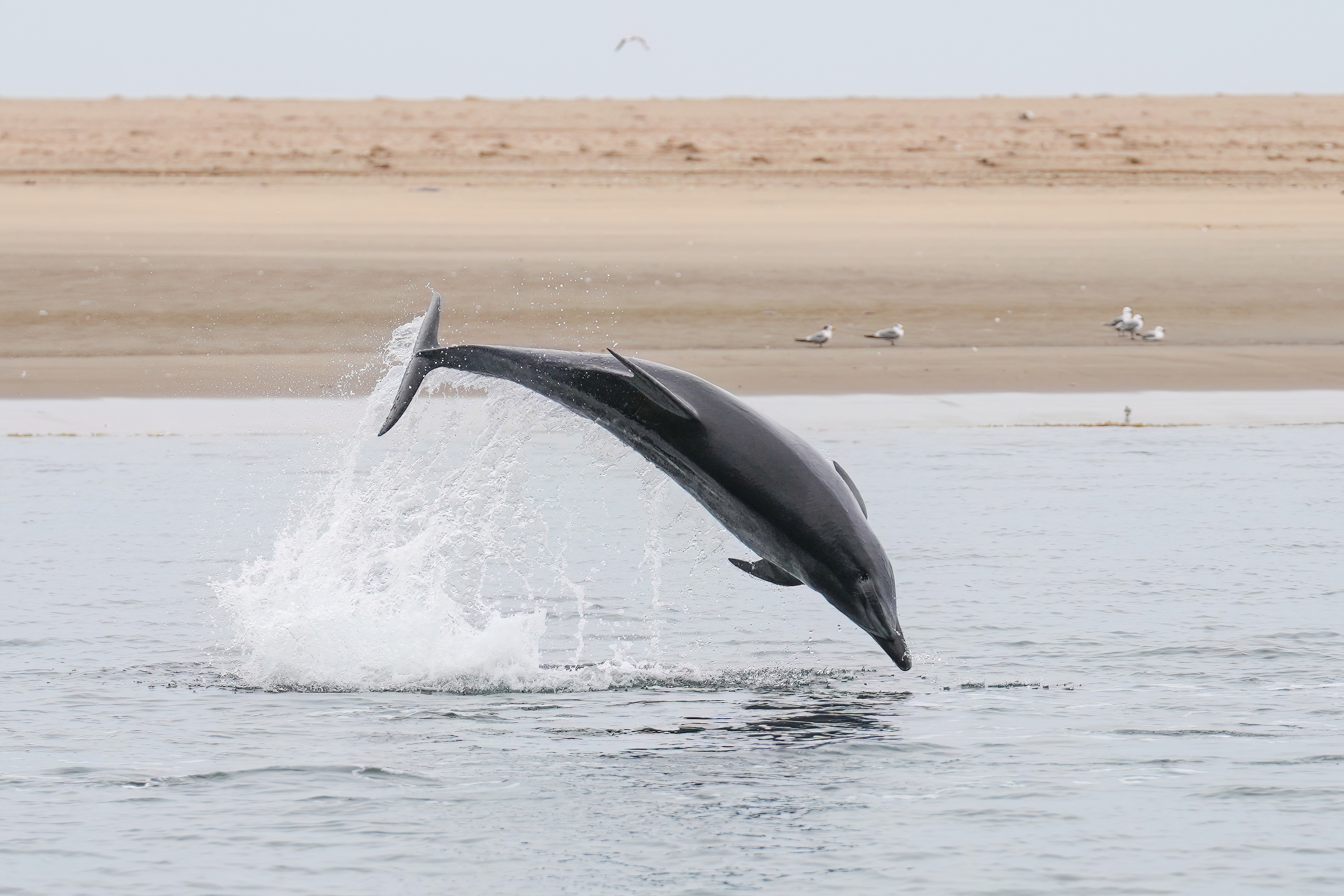
Atlantic bottlenose dolphin breaching in Namibia

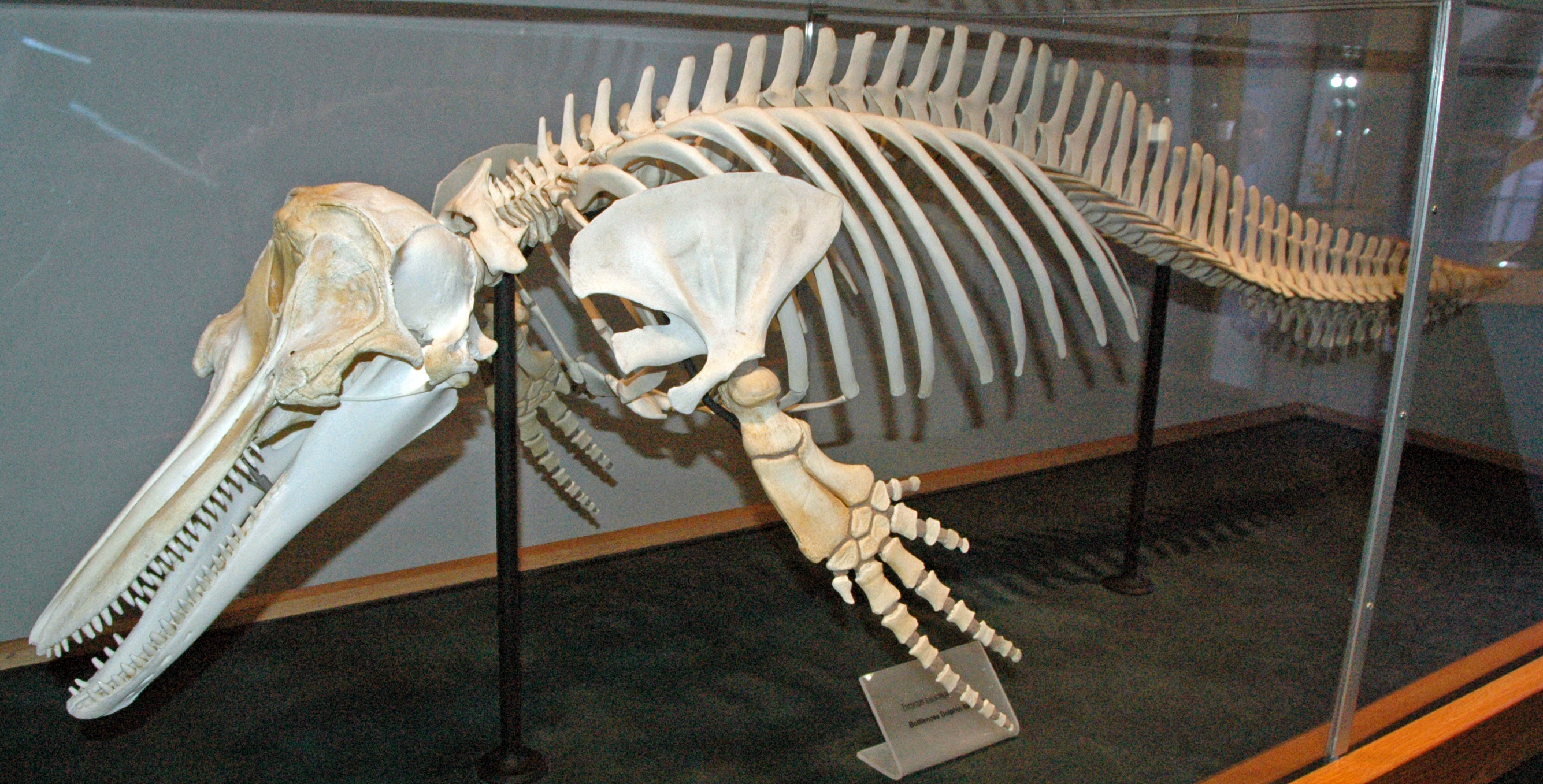
The skeleton

Their necks are more flexible than other dolphins' due to five of their seven vertebrae not being fused together like in other dolphins.

== Taxonomy ==
Until 1998, all bottlenose dolphins were considered one species T. truncatus. That year, the Indo-Pacific bottlenose dolphin (T. aduncus) was recognized as a separate species. The two species are thought to have split during the mid-Pleistocene, about 1 million years ago.

Currently, four common bottlenose dolphin subspecies are recognized:

T. t. truncatus, the nominotypical subspecies
T. t. ponticus, or the Black Sea bottlenose dolphin
T. t. gephyreus, or Lahille's bottlenose dolphin
T. t. nuuanu, or the Eastern Tropical Pacific bottlenose dolphin

Bottlenose dolphins along the southern California and Baja California coasts were previously recognized as the Pacific bottlenose dolphin, T. t. gillii, originally described as distinct species T. gillii. The name has since been reclassified as a junior synonym of Tursiops truncatus. Additionally, bottlenose dolphins along the Pacific coast of Central America were described as T. nuuanu in 1911. A review of T. gillii and T. nuuanu specimens supported T. gillii as a synonym of T. truncatus and T. nuaanu as a unique subspecies.

A 2020 study identified four distinct lineages within T. truncatus, each of which could be a distinct subspecies: a lineage native to the coastal regions of the western North Atlantic (off the coast of North America), an offshore lineage found worldwide in pelagic ecosystems, a lineage native to the Mediterranean, and a lineage restricted to the Black Sea (previously described as T. truncatus ponticus). The study noted only weak differentiation between the Black Sea and Mediterranean lineages, and found them to form a sister group to the offshore lineage, indicating that they likely descended from offshore bottlenoses that colonized the Mediterranean and Black Seas. The clade containing the offshore, Mediterranean, and Black Sea populations was sister to the western North Atlantic lineage, indicating deep divergence between the two. An analysis of the morphology, genetics, and evolutionary divergence of the western North Atlantic coastal and offshore ecotypes supported the coastal form as being a distinct species. While the offshore type was retained within T. truncatus, the coastal dolphins are now recognized as Tamanend's bottlenose dolphin (T. erebennus).

== Ecology and behavior ==
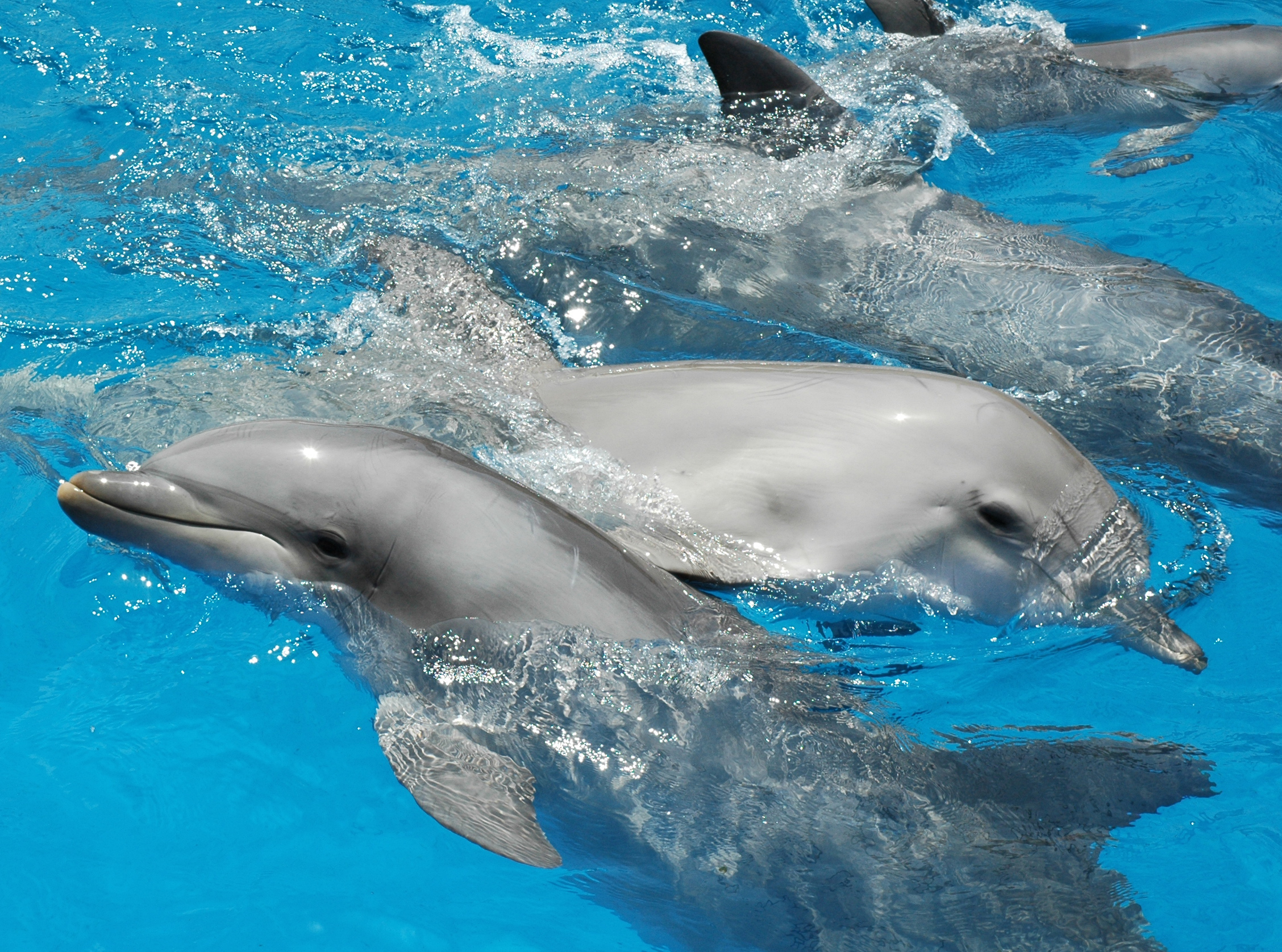
Bottlenose dolphin socialization at SeaWorld

As a very social species, the common bottlenose dolphin lives in groups called pods that typically number about 15 individuals, but group size varies from pairs of dolphins to over 100 or even occasionally over 1,000 animals for short periods of time. Group structure depends on the sex and age of the dolphins, but may change depending on the group. Their geographic range dictates a lot of their behaviors including the densities of dolphins while traveling. The types of groups include: nursery groups, juvenile groups, and groups of adult males. Male dolphins tend to form pair bonds, which are the strongest of dolphin bonds, while females stay with their calves for 3-8 years and then tend to stay in social groups. Typically, common bottlenose dolphins are more social after they have eaten in the mid-day or evening. During these times, they are often seen engaging in group interactions, including play, vocalizations, and cooperative swimming behaviors.

=== Echolocation ===
Use of echolocation with the melon to recognize objects in the surrounding water.

Dolphin use of their blowholes and nasal sacs to communicate and their ability to echolocate with their melon are keys to their success. Echolocation uses sound waves that are emitted and received to understand their surroundings. As sound waves are emitted they are bounced back and received as nerve impulses in the brain which can be interpreted at a frequency of 120 kHz. This allows dolphin to know the location, shape and size of objects aiding in navigation, communication, hunting, and awareness of predators nearby. Dolphins can emit both high and low frequency sounds, but lower frequencies travel best in the water allowing for the best results while using echolocation.

=== Communication ===
In addition to echolocation, dolphins communicate through whistles, squeaks and pulses. Dolphins address each other individually by matching each other's signature whistle. Body language is also a key method of communication, including gestures, postures, and physical contact, used to convey information, reinforce social bonds, and coordinate group activities.

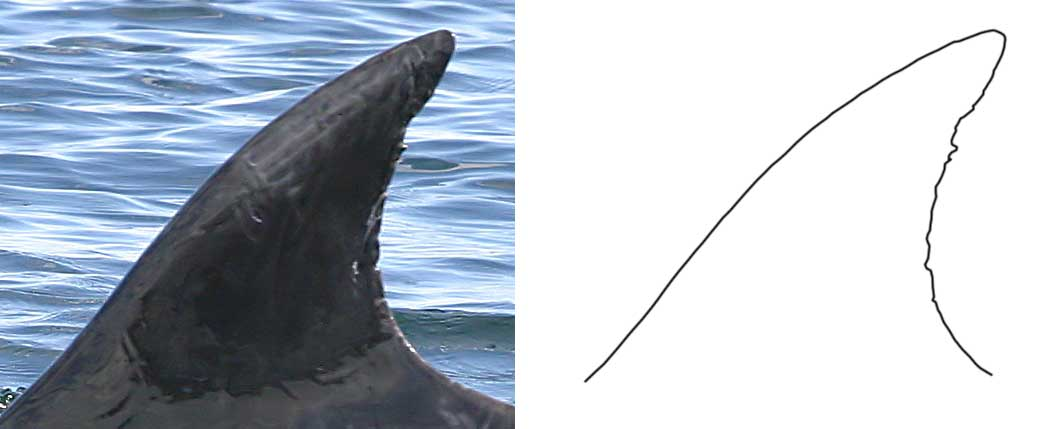
Notch pattern shown in dolphin dorsal fin as unique identifier for individuals.

Body language and contact is also used in conflict over mates and resources. In conflict, bottlenose dolphins grab ahold of each other with their teeth, which can form unique "rake marks". These primarily superficial knicks and notches on the body or the dorsal fin makes dolphins individually identifiable. These unique marks are universally used to identify dolphins in studies around the globe.

==== Calf-directed communication ====
Common bottlenose dolphin signature whistles, which are in a higher frequency range than humans can hear, have an important role in facilitating mother–calf contact. In the Sarasota Dolphin Research Program's library of recordings were 19 female common bottlenose dolphins (Tursiops truncatus) producing signature whistles both with and without the presence of their dependent calf. In all 19 cases, the mother dolphin changed the same signature whistle when the calf was present, by reaching a higher frequency, or using a wider frequency range. Similarly, humans use higher fundamental frequencies and a wider pitch range to inflect child–directed speech (CDS). This has rarely been discovered in other species. The researchers stated that CDS benefits for humans are cueing the child to pay attention, long-term bonding, and promoting the development of lifelong vocal learning, with parallels in these bottlenose dolphins in an example of convergent evolution.

=== Diet ===
Its diet consists mainly of eels, squid, shrimp and a wide variety of fishes. It does not chew its food, instead swallowing it whole. Dolphin pods often work as a team to harvest schools of fish, though they also hunt individually. Dolphins search for prey primarily using echolocation, which is a form of sonar.

The diet of common bottlenose dolphin pods varies depending on area. Along the U.S. Atlantic coast, the main prey includes Atlantic croakers (Micropogonias undulatus), spot (Leiostomus xanthurus) and American silver perch (Bairdiella chrysoura), while in South Africa, African maasbankers (Trachurus delagoa), olive grunters (Pomadasys olivaceus), and pandora (Pagellus bellottii) are common bottlenose dolphin's typical prey. Their hunting strategies depend on what they are eating; for example, with fish they will circle the school and use their echolocation to feed on them one by one. They can also stun fish using sonar or smash them into corals depending on their speed.

According to combined stomach content and stable isotope analyses in the Gulf of Cádiz, although European conger (Conger conger) and European hake (Merluccius merluccius) are most important prey of common bottlenose dolphins, mass-balance isotopic mixing model (MixSIAR), using δ13C and δ15N shows that Sparidae species; seabreams (Diplodus annularis and D. bellottii), rubberlip grunt (Plectorhinchus mediterraneus), and common pandora, (Pagellus erythrinus) and a mixture of other species including European hake, mackerels (Scomber colias, S. japonicus and S. scombrus), European conger, red bandfish (Cepola macrophthalma) and European pilchard (Sardina pilchardus) are the assimilated diet.

Research indicates that the type and range of fish in a dolphin's diet can have a significant impact on its health and metabolism. Dolphins eat 10–20% of their body weight each day, with pregnant and nursing females eating the most.

=== Reproduction ===
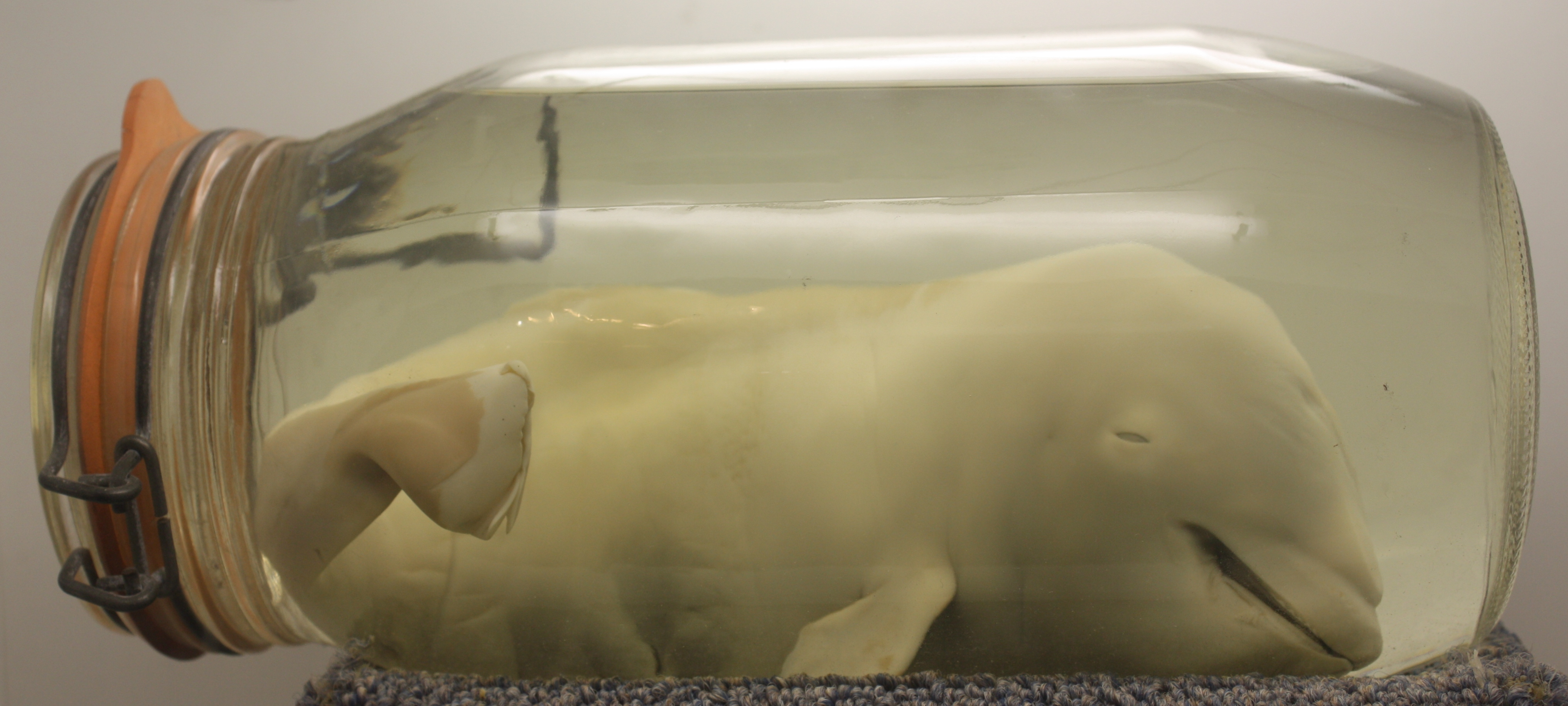
The immersion specimen of "Biskit", a three months fetus displayed at the Dolphin Discovery Centre in Bunbury, Western Australia

Mating behavior of the bottlenose dolphin is polygamous. Although they can breed throughout the year, it mostly occurs in spring, and with a 12 month gestation period mating season and birthing season overlap. Males form alliances, or pair bonds, to seek an estrous female and they attempt to breed the most while keeping other males away from viable females. For a chance to mate with the female, males separate the female from her home range. Females bear a calf every three to six years. After a year-long gestation period, females bear a single calf. Newborn calves are between 0.8 and 1.4 m (2 ft 7 in and 4 ft 7 in) long and weigh between 15 and 30 kg (33 and 66 lb). The calf's suckling lasts between 18 and 20 months and they are weaned between three and eight years of age. Females typically reproduce every 3 to 6 years when sexual maturity is reached, and there is no recorded menopause in the bottlenose dolphin species. Sexual maturity varies by population, and ranges from 5–14 years of age; sexual maturity occurs between 8 and 13 years for males and 5 to 10 years for females.

=== Life expectancy ===
The average life span of common bottlenose dolphins is at least 40 years old and up to 60 years old, with females typically living longer than males. but in captivity they have been known to live to up to 51 years old.

The main threats to bottlenose dolphins depends on their geographic range. Dolphins living in shallow coastal waters tend to be the top predator with the exception of young dolphins having to be protected from sharks by their mothers. Dolphin communities out in the deep ocean have more threats with shark attacks but living in pods allows them to survive. Other predators, mainly impacting newborns, include stingrays and orcas.

=== Intelligence ===
Common bottlenose dolphins are known for their high intelligence. They have the longest social memories of any non-human species, and can recognize individual whistles after being separated from another dolphin for over 20 years.

Common bottlenose dolphins have an encephalization quotient of 5.26, which is even higher than chimpanzees. This more than likely contributes to their high intelligence.

Many investigations of bottlenose intelligence include tests of mimicry, use of artificial language, object categorization, and self-recognition. This intelligence has driven considerable interaction with humans. The common bottlenose dolphin is popular in aquarium shows and television programs such as Flipper. It has also been trained for military uses such as locating sea mines or detecting and marking enemy divers, as for example in the U.S. Navy Marine Mammal Program. In some areas, they cooperate with local fishermen by driving fish toward the fishermen and eating the fish that escape the fishermen's nets.

== Distribution ==
Although dolphins inhabit every ocean of the planet including some rivers and other ecosystems, the common bottlenose dolphin can be found in the warmer oceanic regions specifically in temperate, subtropical, and tropical oceans around the world. The global population has been estimated at 600,000. Some bottlenose populations live closer to the shore (inshore populations) and others live further out to sea (offshore populations). Generally, offshore populations are larger, darker, and have proportionally shorter fins and beaks. Offshore populations can migrate up to 4,200 km (2,600 mi) in a season, but inshore populations tend to move less. However, some inshore populations make long migrations in response to El Niño events. The species has occurred as far as 50° north in eastern Pacific waters, possibly as a result of warm water events. The coastal dolphins appear to adapt to warm, shallow waters. It has a smaller body and larger flippers, for maneuverability and heat dispersal. They can be found in harbors, bays, lagoons and estuaries. Offshore dolphins, however, are adapted to cooler, deeper waters. Certain qualities in their blood suggest they are more suited to deep diving. Their considerably larger body protects them against predators and helps them retain heat.

== Other human interactions ==
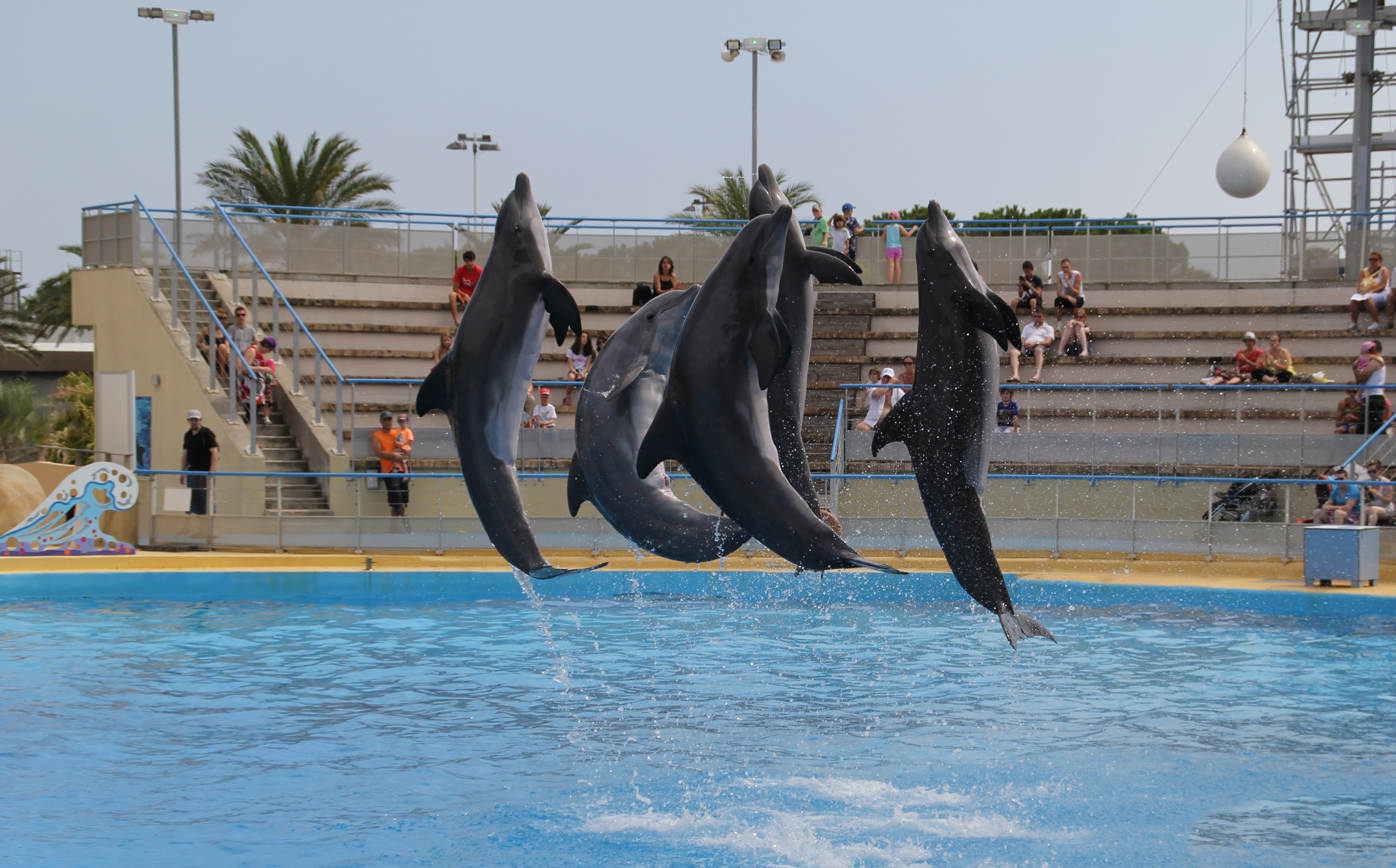
Five dolphins jumping in a show

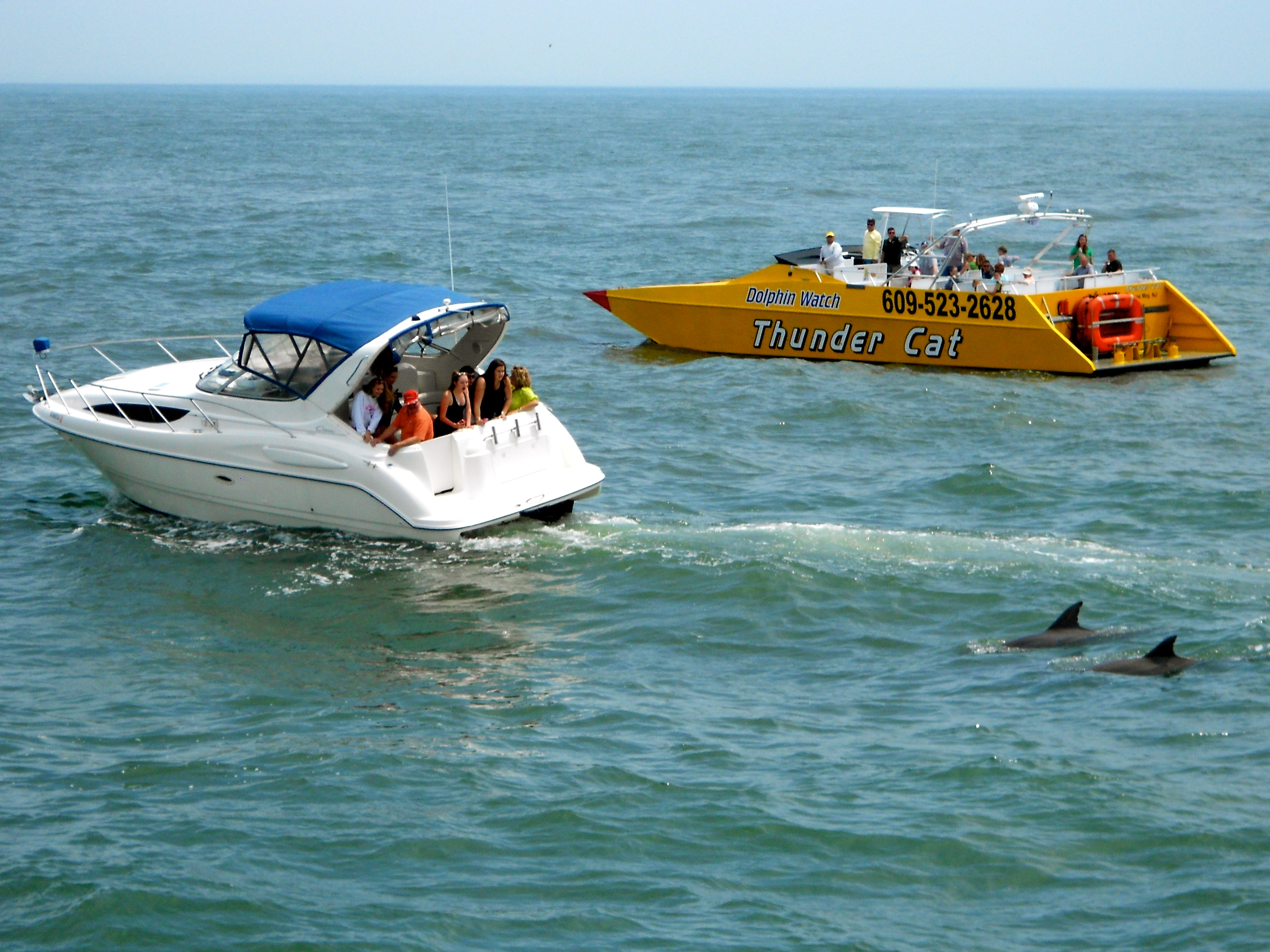
The dolphin watching in the ocean at south of Cape May, New Jersey

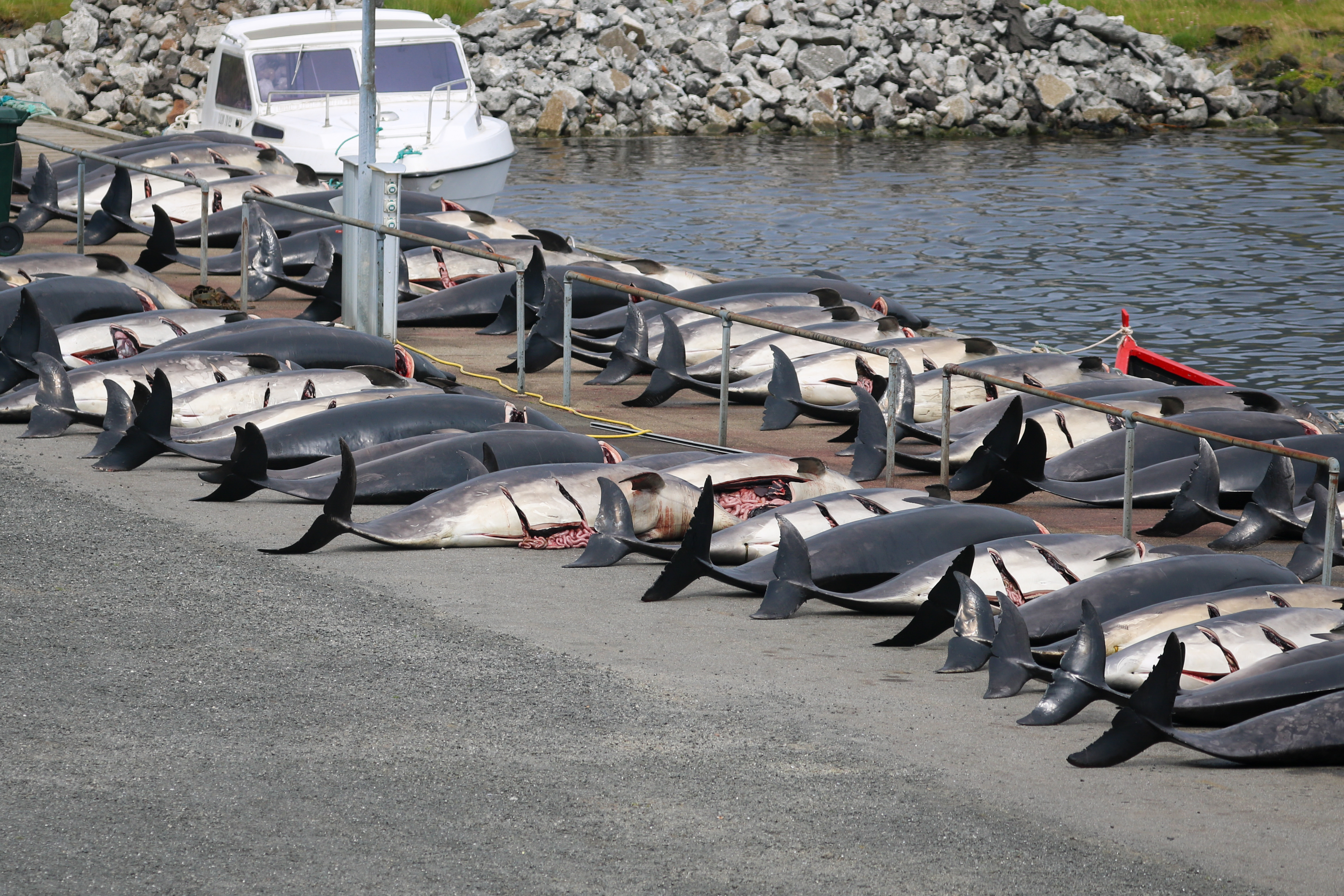
Killed bottlenose dolphins on harbour in Skálabotnur, Faroe Islands, July 2022

Some interactions with humans are harmful to the dolphins. Dolphin hunting industry exists in multiple countries including Japan, where common bottlenose dolphins are hunted for food annually in the town of Taiji, and the Faroe Islands. Also, dolphins are sometimes killed inadvertently as a bycatch of tuna fishing.

Tião was a well-known solitary male bottlenose dolphin that was first spotted in the town of São Sebastião in Brazil around 1994 and frequently allowed humans to interact with him. The dolphin later became infamous for killing a swimmer and injuring many others, which earned it the nickname of killer dolphin.

Fungie was another solitary male bottlenose, living in close contact with humans in Dingle Harbour, Ireland, from 1983 until his disappearance in 2020. He became a symbol of the town, although some doubt exists over whether he was a single dolphin.

A lonely and potentially sexually frustrated dolphin was blamed in August 2024 for a spike in attacks on swimmers in Mihama, a Japanese seaside town.

Another concern is the bycatch of bottlenose dolphins in commercial fishing gear. Although U.S. laws such as the Marine Mammal Protection Act are in place, bycatch remains a significant issue, resulting in numerous fatalities among common bottlenose dolphins.

== Conservation ==
The North Sea, Baltic, Mediterranean and Black Sea populations of the common bottlenose dolphin are listed in Appendix II to the Convention on the Conservation of Migratory Species of Wild Animals (CMS) of the Bonn Convention, since they have an unfavorable conservation status or would benefit significantly from international cooperation organized by tailored agreements.

The species is included in Appendix II of the Convention on International Trade in Endangered Species (CITES), meaning international trade (including in parts/derivatives) is regulated.

Estimated population of a few specific areas are including:

Area	Population
Northern Gulf of Mexico	97,964
Eastern coast of North America	110,000
Eastern Tropical Pacific	243,500
Hawaiian Islands	3,215
Coastal of California	345
Japan	36,791
Eastern Sulu Sea	2,628
Western European continental shelf	12,600
Mediterranean Sea	fewer than 10,000
Black Sea	at least several thousand

Common bottlenose dolphins are protected under the Marine Mammal Protection Act, which aims to conserve marine mammal populations. The Act includes penalties of up to $20,000 in fines and possible imprisonment for harming these animals. Additionally, researchers have begun using Geographic Information Systems (GIS) to study dolphin habitats, behaviors, and areas where harmful human activity is occurring, helping guide conservation efforts.

The species is covered by the Agreement on Small Cetaceans of the Baltic, North East Atlantic, Irish and North Seas (ASCOBANS), the Agreement on the Conservation of Cetaceans in the Black Sea, Mediterranean Sea and Contiguous Atlantic Area (ACCOBAMS), the Memorandum of Understanding for the Conservation of Cetaceans and Their Habitats in the Pacific Islands Region, and the Memorandum of Understanding Concerning the Conservation of the Manatee and Small Cetaceans of Western Africa and Macaronesia.

=== Marine pollution ===
Common bottlenose dolphins are the most common apex predators found in coastal and estuarine ecosystems along the southern coast of the US, thus serve as an important indicator species of bioaccumulation and health of the ecosystem.

It is believed that some diseases commonly found in dolphins are related to human behaviors, such as water pollution. Water pollution is linked to point and non-point source pollution. Point source pollution comes from a single source such as an oil spill and/or chemical discharge from a specific facility. The environmental impact of the Deepwater Horizon oil spill caused a direct impact and still serves as a long-term impact of future populations. Common bottlenose dolphins use these important habitats for calving, foraging, and feeding. Environmental impacts or changes from chemicals or marine pollution can alter and disrupt endocrine systems, affecting future populations. For example, oil spills have been related to lung and reproductive diseases in female dolphins. A recent study suggested signs of lung disease and impaired stress in 32 dolphins that were captured and assessed in Barataria Bay, Louisiana, US. Out of these 32 dolphins, 10 were found pregnant and, upon a 47-month check up, only 20% produced feasible calves, compared to a previous success rate of 83%, in the same area. It is believed that a recent oil spill in this area is partially to blame for these severely low numbers.

Dense human development along the eastern coast of Florida and intense agricultural activity have resulted in increased freshwater inputs, changes in drainage patterns, and altered water quality (i.e. chemical contamination, high nutrient input, decreased salinity, decreased sea grass habitat, and eutrophication. High nutrient input from agriculture chemicals and fertilizers causes eutrophication and hypoxia, causing a severe reduction in water quality. Excess of phosphorus and nitrogen from these non-point sources deplete the natural cycle of oxygen by overconsumption of algae. Harmful algal blooms are responsible for dead zones and unusual mortality events of common bottlenose dolphins consuming these toxic fish from the brevetoxin produced by the dinoflagellate Karenia brevis. Brevetoxins are neurotoxins that can cause acute respiratory and neurological symptoms, including death, in marine mammals, sea turtles, birds, and fishes.

== See also ==
- List of cetaceans
- Unihemispheric slow-wave sleep
