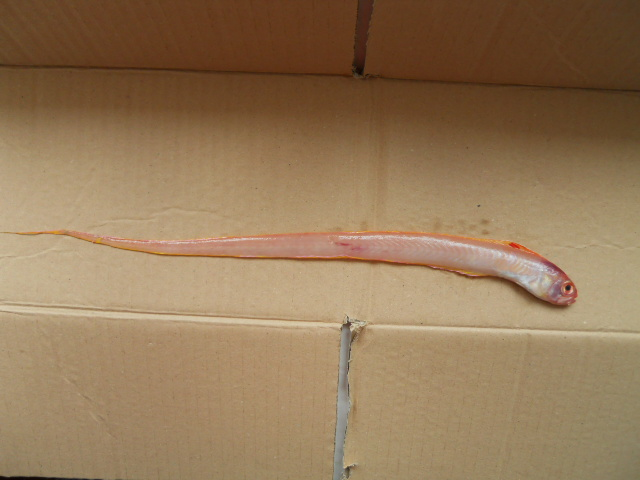
- Cepola macrophthalma

Scientific classification
- Kingdom: Animalia
- Phylum: Chordata
- Class: Actinopterygii
- Order: Acanthuriformes
- Family: Cepolidae
- Subfamily: Cepolinae; Rafinesque, 1815

= Cepolinae =

Subfamily of fishes

Cepolinae is one of two subfamilies of marine ray-finned fish belonging to family Cepolidae, the bandfishes.

== Taxonomy ==
Cepolinae was named by the French polymath Constantine Samuel Rafinesque as the family Cepolidae. It became a subfamily when the genus Owstonia was added to the Cepolidae, having previously been considered a monotypic family Owstonidae, and now considered to be the subfamily Owstoninae. The name, Cepolinae, is derived from the Linnaeus’ 1764 name for the type genus, Cepola and means "little onion", Linnaeus did not explain why he chose this name. It is likely derived from cepollam or cepulam, which in 1686 was said by Francis Willughby to be local names among Roman fishermen for the similar "Fierasfer", a pearlfish, to which Linnaeus believed Cepola macrophthalma was related. As well as this, in 1872 Giovanni Canestrini reported that in Naples the common name for C. macropthalma is Pesce cipolia meaning “onion fish”.

== Genera ==
There are two genera in the subfamily Cepolinae, containing 9 species:

- Acanthocepola Bleeker, 1874
- Cepola Linnaeus, 1764

== Characteristics ==
Cepolinae bandfishes are clearly elongated in shape, more so than Owstonia bandfishes. They have total counts of 48-79 vertebrae and 55-90 soft rays in the dorsal fin. The last soft rays of both the dorsal and anal fins are joined to the caudal fin by a membrane. They vary in maximum total length from 25 cm (9.8 in) in Cepola australis to 80 cm (31 in) in Cepola macrophthalma.

== Distribution, habitat and biology ==
Cepolinae bandfishes are found in the eastern Atlantic, including the Mediterranean Sea, and in the Indian Ocean and the Western Pacific Ocean. They live over soft bottoms of sand and mud, burrowing into the substrate and feed on zooplankton.
