= Cepola pauciradiata =

Conservation status
- Data Deficient (IUCN 3.1)

Scientific classification
- Kingdom: Animalia
- Phylum: Chordata
- Class: Actinopterygii
- Order: Acanthuriformes
- Family: Cepolidae
- Genus: Cepola
- Species: C. pauciradiata

Binomial name
- Cepola pauciradiata Cadenat, 1950

Species of fish

Cepola pauciradiata, the Guinean bandfish (also known as the red bandfish, a name given to most of the other members of the genus Cepola, especially the European species, Cepola macrophthalma), is a species of marine ray-finned fish belonging to the family Cepolidae, the bandfishes. It is found on the Atlantic coast of Africa.

== Taxonomy ==
Cepola pauciradiata was first formally described in 1950 by the French ichthyologist Jean Cadenat with the type locality given as the coast of Senegal. The specific name pauciradiata is a compound of pauci meaning "few" and radiata which means "rayed", a reference to the lower counts of soft rays in the dorsal and anal fins relative to other members of the genus. C. pauciradiata may be a junior synonym of C. macrophthalma.

== Description ==
Cepola pauciradiata attains a maximum total length f 70 cm (28 in). It is an elongated fish with the rearmost soft rays of both the elongated dorsal and anal fins connected to its lanceolate caudal fin by a membrane to form a continuous fin.

== Distribution and habitat ==
Cepola pauciradiata has been recorded as occurring on the Atlantic coast of western Africa from Mauritania in the north to Angola in the south. It is most commonly found at depths between 25 and 100 m (82 and 328 ft) on muddy or sandt bottoms.

== Biology ==
Cepola pauciradiata occurs either singly or in small aggregations on muddy and sand bottoms. They hide within burrows that they dig themselves or else they are seen swimming above the substrate. They mostly feed on zooplankton, especially small crustaceans and chaetognaths. The biology of this fish is little known.
