= Acanthocepola indica =

Conservation status
- Least Concern (IUCN 3.1)

Scientific classification
- Kingdom: Animalia
- Phylum: Chordata
- Class: Actinopterygii
- Order: Acanthuriformes
- Family: Cepolidae
- Genus: Acanthocepola
- Species: A. indica

Binomial name
- Acanthocepola indica (F. Day, 1888)

Synonyms
- Cepola indica Day, 1888

Species of marine fish

Acanthocepola indica, the Indian bandfish, is a species of ray-finned fish in the Cepolidae family. The scientific name of the species was first validly published in 1888 by Francis Day.
