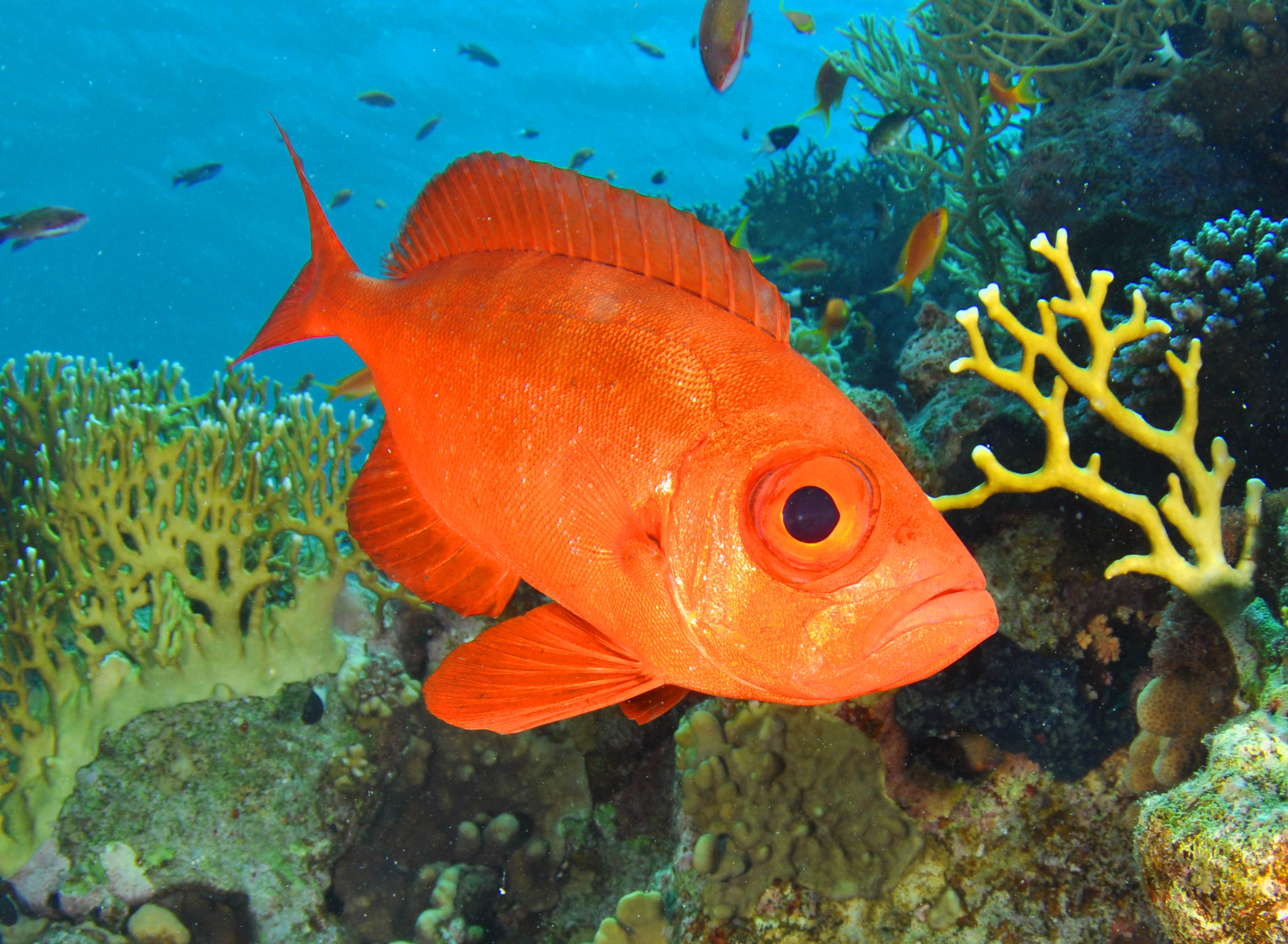
- Priacanthus blochii
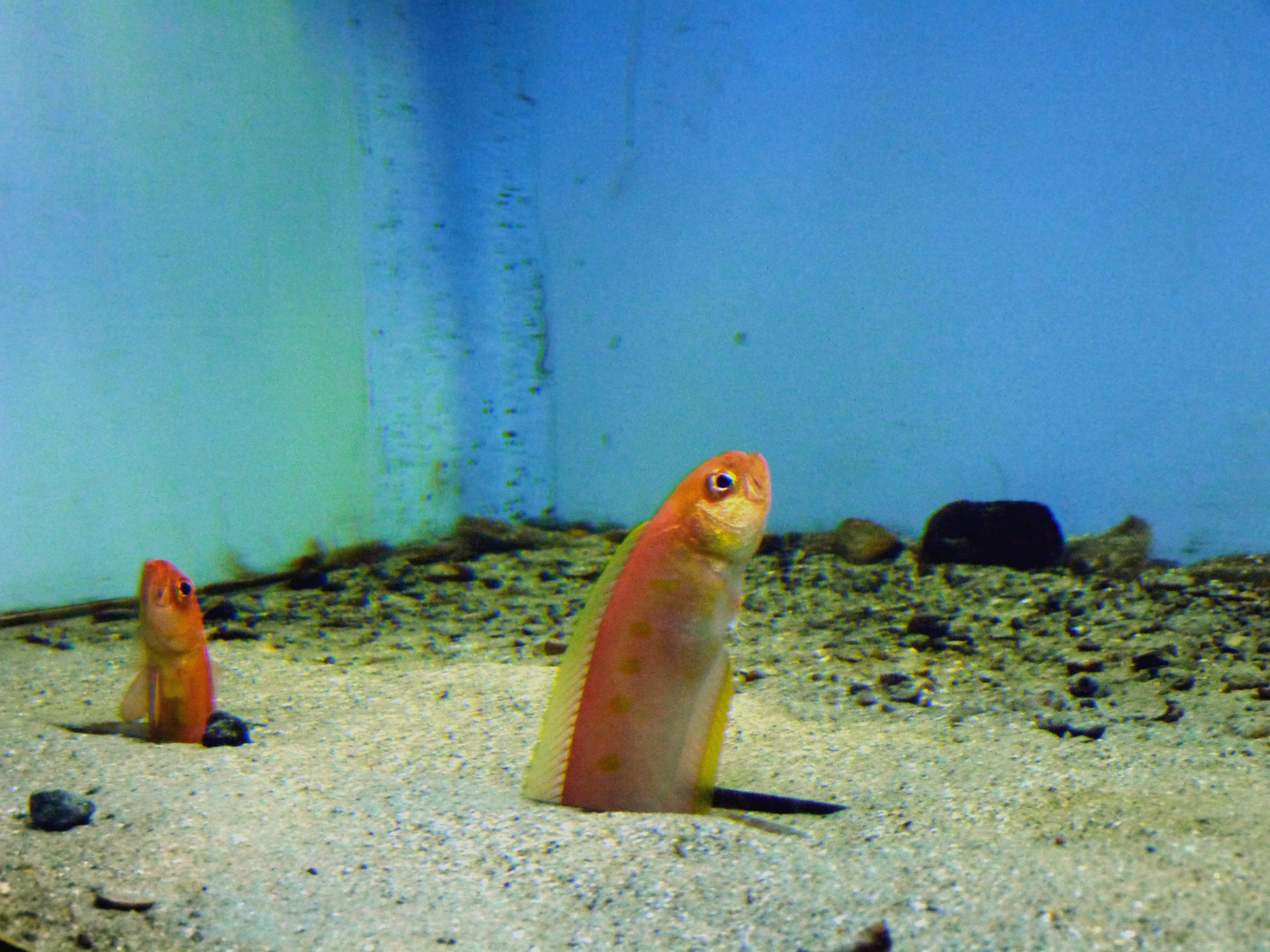
- Acanthocepola krusensternii

Scientific classification
- Kingdom: Animalia
- Phylum: Chordata
- Class: Actinopterygii
- Clade: Eupercaria
- Order: Priacanthiformes; Bleeker, 1871

= Priacanthiformes =

Order of fishes

The Priacanthiformes is a proposed order of marine ray-finned fishes. The order comprises two families, the Priacanthidae and the Cepolidae, which bear very little morphological similarity to each other but which have been shown to be sister taxa in repeated molecular analyses. The exact placement of the order within the series Eupercaria is incertae sedis. However, the more traditional classification followed in the 5th Edition of the Fishes of the World places both these families within the order Perciformes.

== Families ==
The following two families are included in the Priacanthiformes:

- Priacanthidae Günther, 1859 (Bigeyes)
- Cepolidae Rafinesque, 1810 (Bandfishes)

In the 5th edition of Fishes of the World the Priacanthidae are in the suborder Percoidei but with the caveat that they may be more closely related to the Acanthuriformes while the Cepolidae are placed in the monotypic superfamily Cepoloidea.
