= Owstonia taeniosoma =

Scientific classification
- Kingdom: Animalia
- Phylum: Chordata
- Class: Actinopterygii
- Order: Acanthuriformes
- Family: Cepolidae
- Genus: Owstonia
- Species: O. taeniosoma

Binomial name
- Owstonia taeniosoma (Kamohara, 1935)

Synonyms
- Pseudocepola taeniosoma Kamohara, 1935

Species of fish

Owstonia taeniosoma is a species of marine ray-finned fish belonging to the family Cepolidae, the bandfishes. It is known from the Indo-West Pacific region.

== Taxonomy ==
Owstonia taeniosoma was first formally described in 1935 as Pseudocepola taenisoma by the Japanese ichthyologist Toshiji Kamohara with the type locality given as "off Mimase", in the vicinity of Kochi in Kochi Prefecture in Japan. The specific name is a compound of taenia meaning a "band" or "ribbon" and soma meaning "body", a reference to its “much elongated” body compared to other Owstonine bandfishes.

== Characters ==
Owstonia taeniosoma is relatively elongated compared to most species of Owstonia. Its dorsal fin has 3 spines and 26-26 soft rays while the anal fin has 1 spine and 18-19 soft rays. The caudal fin is pointed, like a spearhead, in shape. This species attains a maximum total length of 25 cm (9.8 in). In living fish the colour of the dorsal and anal is pale reddish, with a wide horizontal yellow band running along the centre of each fin with a whitish fin margin and the front part of the anal fin is whitish. The pectoral fin is also pale reddish and the ventral fin are pale. The caudal fin yellowish with a whitish margin. Its bright yellow iris is unusual in the genus.

== Distribution and habitat ==
Owstonia taeniosoma has been recorded from Japan, the Andaman Sea, New Caledonia and eastern Australia. Although its congeners are associated with rocky substrates in deep waters this species is found over sand or mud bottoms on the continental shelf in comparatively shallow depths of 62 to 250 m (203 to 820 ft).
