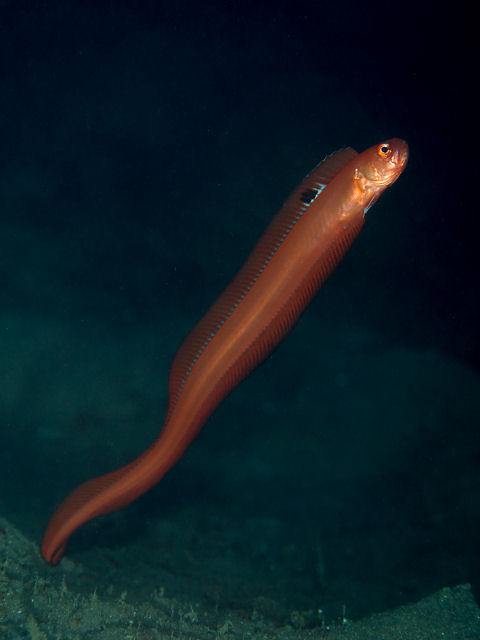

Scientific classification
- Kingdom: Animalia
- Phylum: Chordata
- Class: Actinopterygii
- Order: Acanthuriformes
- Family: Cepolidae
- Genus: Acanthocepola
- Species: A. limbata

Binomial name
- Acanthocepola limbata (Valenciennes, 1835)

Synonyms
- Cepola limbata Valenciennes, 1835

= Acanthocepola limbata =

Species of fish

Acanthocepola limbata, the blackspot bandfish, is a species of ray-finned fish in the Cepolidae family. The scientific name of the species was first validly published in 1835 by Achille Valenciennes.
