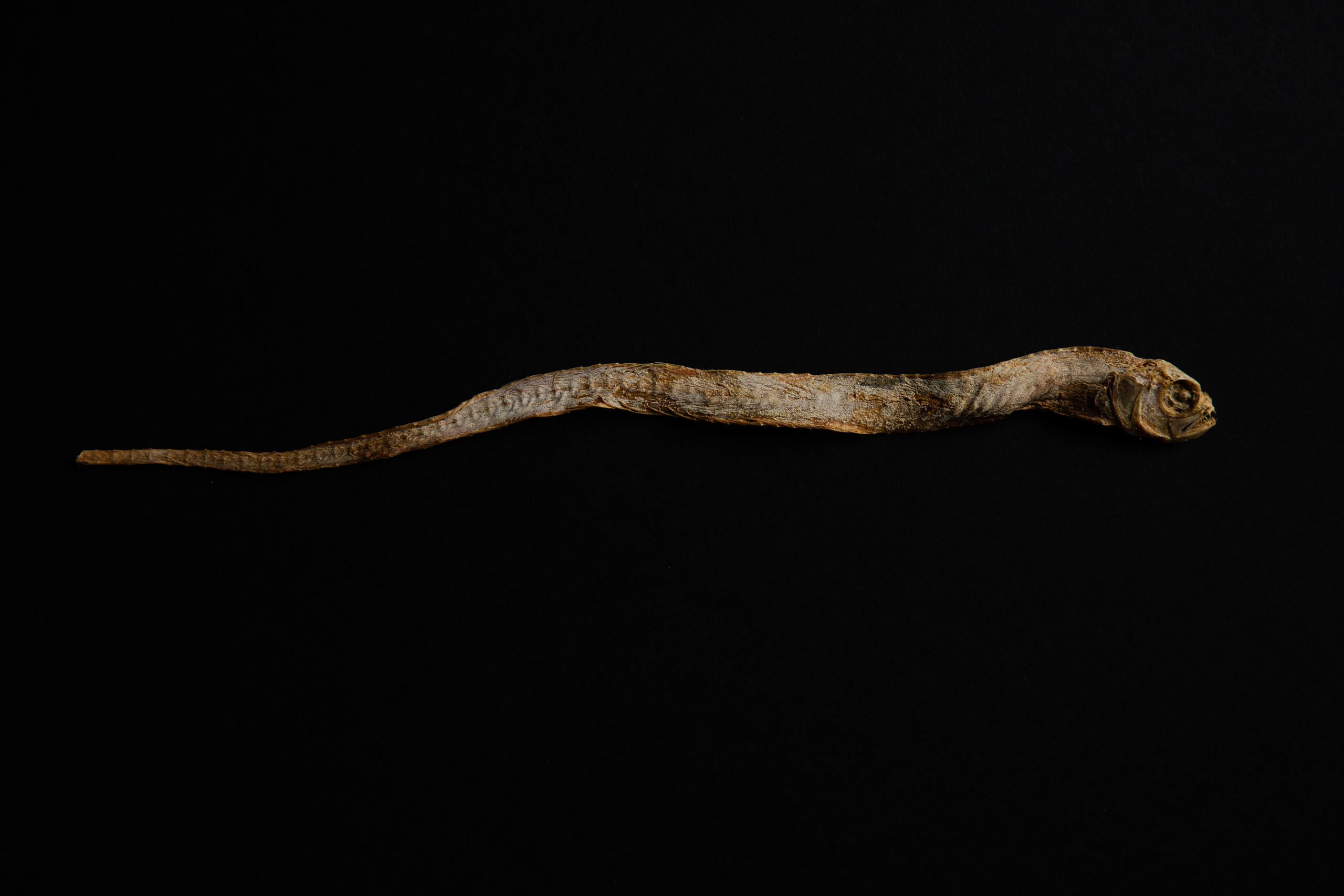

Scientific classification
- Kingdom: Animalia
- Phylum: Chordata
- Class: Actinopterygii
- Order: Acanthuriformes
- Family: Cepolidae
- Genus: Cepola
- Species: C. haastii

Binomial name
- Cepola haastii (Hector, 1881)

Synonyms
- Hypolycodes haastii Hector, 1881; Cepola aotea Waite, 1910

= Cepola haastii =

Species of fish

Cepola haastii is a species of marine ray-finned fish belonging to the family Cepolidae, the bandfishes. It is found on the inner continental shelf around New Zealand. Its length is between 15 and 25 cm. This species is known as the red bandfish, a name given to most of the other members of the genus Cepola, especially the European species, Cepola macrophthalma.

== Taxonomy ==
Cepola haastii was first formally described as Hypolycodes haastii in 1881 by the Scottish born New Zealand geologist, naturalist and surgeon James Hector with the type locality given as Waimarama on the east coast of the North Island near Wellington, New Zealand. The specific name honours the German-born geologist Johann Franz Julius von Haast, the first director of the Canterbury Museum in Christchurch, New Zealand, who tasked Hector to describe this species.

== Description ==
Cepola haastii is an elongated fish with the rearmost soft rays of both the elongated dorsal and anal fins connected to its lanceolate caudal fin by a membrane to form a continuous fin. This species attains a maximum total length of 25 cm (9.8 in). The upper part of the head, the eye, much of the body and the fins are reddish-orange marked with a number of pale silvery bars and blotches on the body and a pale horizontal streak along the middle of the flanks. The preoperculum and operculum, as well as the abdomen are silvery.

== Distribution and habitat ==
Cepola haastii is endemic to New Zealand and may be restricted to the northern part of that country. They live in burrows in soft sediments at depth of less than 200 m (660 ft).

== Biology ==
Cepola haastii live in burrows and emerge from these burrows to feed on zooplankton like other bandfishes.
