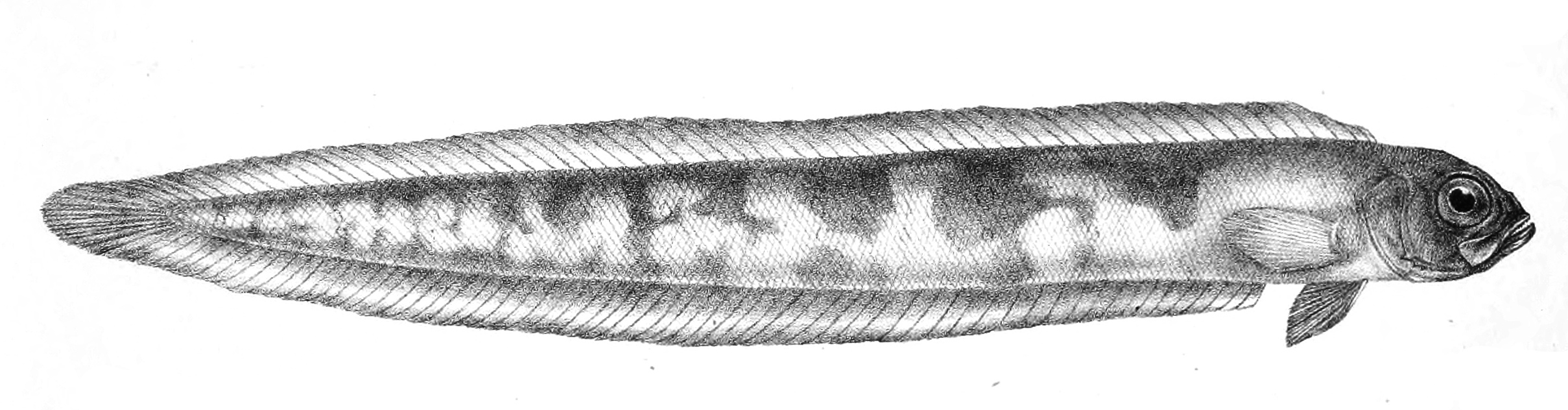

Conservation status
- Least Concern (IUCN 3.1)

Scientific classification
- Kingdom: Animalia
- Phylum: Chordata
- Class: Actinopterygii
- Order: Acanthuriformes
- Family: Cepolidae
- Genus: Acanthocepola
- Species: A. abbreviata

Binomial name
- Acanthocepola abbreviata (Valenciennes, 1835)

Synonyms
- Cepola abbreviata Valenciennes, 1835; Aconthocepola abbreviata (Valenciennes, 1835)

= Acanthocepola abbreviata =

Species of fish

Acanthocepola abbreviata, the bandfish and yellowspotted bandfish, is a species of ray-finned fish in the Cepolidae family. The scientific name of the species was first validly published in 1835 by Achille Valenciennes.
