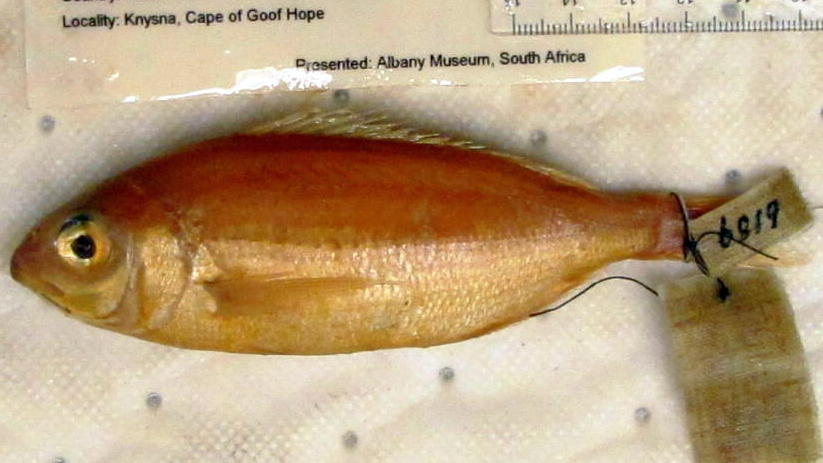

Conservation status
- Least Concern (IUCN 3.1)

Scientific classification
- Kingdom: Animalia
- Phylum: Chordata
- Class: Actinopterygii
- Order: Acanthuriformes
- Family: Sparidae
- Genus: Pagellus
- Species: P. natalensis

Binomial name
- Pagellus natalensis Steindachner, 1903

Synonyms
- Pagellus bellottii natalensis Steindachner, 1903

= Pagellus natalensis =

Species of fish

Pagellus natalensis, the Natal pandora, is a species of marine ray-finned fish belonging to the family Sparidae, which includes the seabreams and porgies. This species is found in the southwestern Indian Ocean.

== Taxonomy ==
Pagellus natalensis was first formally described as a subspecies of Pagellus bellottii, P. b. natalensis, in 1903 by the Austrian ichthyologist Franz Steindachner with its type locality given as Durban in KwaZulu-Natal. The genus Pagellus is placed in the family Sparidae within the order Spariformes by the 5th edition of Fishes of the World. Some authorities classify this genus in the subfamily Pagellinae, but the 5th edition of Fishes of the World does not recognise subfamilies within the Sparidae.

== Etymology ==
Pagellus natalensis has the specific name natalensis meaning "of Natal", the type locality being in, what was then, the Colony of Natal.

== Description ==
Pagellus natalensis has 12 spines and 10 or 11 soft rays supporting its dorsal fin while its anal fin is supported by 3 spines and 10 soft rays. The fusiform, elongate body, the standard length is 2.8 to 3 times the depth, is moderately compressed. The dorsal profile of the head is convex between the upper lip and the origin of the dorsal fin. Both jaws have small pointed teeth at the front and 2 rows of molar-like teeth at the back It has a silvery red body, lighter in colour ventrally, with pink fins. This is the smaller species in the genus Pagellus with a maximum published total length of 30 cm (12 in).

== Distribution and habitat ==
Pagellus natalensis is found in the southwestern Indian Ocean where it occurs from Mossel Bay in the Western Cape to Bazaruto in Mozambique, it is also found off southern Madagascar. This species occurs at depths down to around 150 m (490 ft) over sandy and muddy substrates.

== Biology ==
Pagellus natalensis Afeeds on invertebrates associated with sandy bottoms and reefs, its diet includes small crustaceans, echinoderms, polychaetes, fish and molluscs. It is gonochoristic and spawning takes place in winter and spring, with a peak in August and September.

== Fisheries ==
Pahellus natalensis is too small in size to be of interest to commercial fisheries, but it is taken as bycatch and this may be used as bait.
