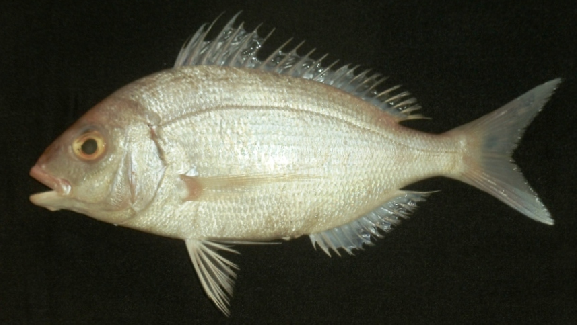

Conservation status
- Least Concern (IUCN 3.1)

Scientific classification
- Kingdom: Animalia
- Phylum: Chordata
- Class: Actinopterygii
- Order: Acanthuriformes
- Family: Sparidae
- Genus: Pagellus
- Species: P. affinis

Binomial name
- Pagellus affinis Boulenger, 1888

= Pagellus affinis =

Species of fish

Pagellus affinis, the Arabian pandora, is a species of marine ray-finned fish belonging to the family Sparidae, which includes the seabreams and porgies. This species is found in the northern Western Indian Ocean.

== Taxonomy ==
Pagellus affinis was first formally described in 1888 by the Belgian-born British zoologist George Albert Boulenger with its type locality given as Muscat in Oman. The genus Pagellus is placed in the family Sparidae within the order Spariformes by the 5th edition of Fishes of the World. Some authorities classify this genus in the subfamily Pagellinae, but the 5th edition of Fishes of the World does not recognise subfamilies within the Sparidae.

== Etymology ==
Pagellus affinis has the specific name affinis which means "related". This refers to this species similarity to Pagellus erythrinus as well as the close relationship of the two species.

== Description ==
Pagellus affinis has a slightly elongated and fusiform body with a depth that fits into its standard length 2.6 to 3 times. The dorsal fin is supported by 12 spines and 10 soft rays while the anal fin contains 3 spines and 10 soft rays. The bases of the dorsal and anal fins are covered with a low sheath covered in scales. The dorsal profile of the head is convex from the snout to the origin of the dorsal fin. There are thin sharp teeth and small molar teeth in each jaw. The body and head are pale silvery pink, lighter on the belly. The maximum published total length of 42.1 cm (16.6 in).

== Distribution and habitat ==
Pagellus affinis is found in the northern part of the western Indian Ocean from the Gulf of Aden and Somaliland along the southern coast of the Arabian Peninsula to the Persian Gulf and the Arabian Sea as far east as Pakistan. This species is found at depths down to 150 m (490 ft) over various substrates.

== Biology ==
Pagellus affinis found off Oman have sex ratios that differ significantly from the expected ratio of 1:1. males ttend to be larger than females, and this suggests that this species is a protogynous hermaphrodite. These fishes spawned during the monsoon from August to October at mean water temperatures between 22.3 and 23.5 °C (72.1 and 74.3 °F).

== Fisheries ==
Pagellus afinis is the most important species landed in Oman by that nation's commercial fisheries. It is usually caught by trawling.
