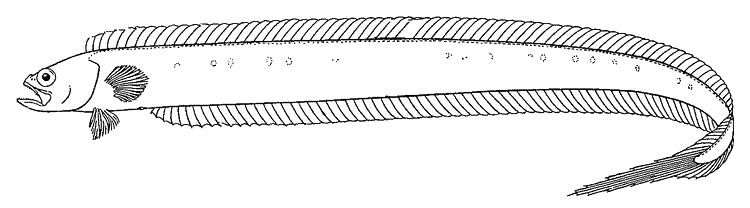
- Cepola schlegelii

Scientific classification
- Kingdom: Animalia
- Phylum: Chordata
- Class: Actinopterygii
- Order: Acanthuriformes
- Family: Cepolidae
- Genus: Cepola
- Species: C. schlegelii

Binomial name
- Cepola schlegelii Bleeker, 1854

= Cepola schlegelii =

Species of fish

Cepola schlegelii is a species of marine ray-finned fish belonging to the family Cepolidae, the bandfishes. It is found in the Indo-West Pacific region.

== Taxonomy ==
Cepola schlegelii was first formally described in 1854 by the Dutch medical doctor, ichthyologist, and herpetologist Pieter Bleeker with the type locality given as Kaminoseki in Japan. The specific name honours the German ornithologist and herpetologist Hermann Schlegel.

== Description ==
Cepola schlegelii is an elongated fish with the rearmost soft rays of both the elongated dorsal and anal fins connected to its lanceolate caudal fin by a membrane to form a continuous fin. The dorsal fin has 68-70 soft rays while the anal fin has 60-64. The pectoral fin has 19 fin rays There are no spines on the edge of the preoperculum and the cheeks are scaleless. This species attains a maximum total length of 50 cm (20 in). The main colour of the body is red, with a black spot in the membranes of the jaw. The cheek, operculum and fin bases are whitish.

== Distribution and habitat ==
Cepola schlegelii is confirmed from the western Pacific Ocean from Indonesia east to the Philippines and Papua New Guinea, north as far as Japan. In Australia it has been recorded from Bernier Island in Western Australia and north of Wessel Island in the Northern Territory and in the Gulf of Carpentaria. It may also be found on the Northwest Shelf off Western Australia. Reports from Sumatra and South Africa are doubtful. They are found on muddy bottoms in relatively deep water up to 100 m (330 ft)>

== Biology ==
Cepola schlegelii is normally encountered in small groups. Bandfishes of the genus Cepola live in burrows in fine substrates. They feed on zooplankton and may rise to 15 m (49 ft) into the water column to feed.

== Utilisation ==
Cepola schelegelii is uncommon in the aquarium trade.
