= Australian bandfish =

- Holotype

Scientific classification
- Kingdom: Animalia
- Phylum: Chordata
- Class: Actinopterygii
- Order: Acanthuriformes
- Family: Cepolidae
- Genus: Cepola
- Species: C. australis

Binomial name
- Cepola australis J. D. Ogilby, 1899

Species of fish

The Australian bandfish (Cepola australis) is a species of bandfish in the family Cepolidae. It has been reported from the Indo-Pacific coastal regions of Australia, New Zealand, and New Caledonia, although some of these records may represent confusion with other species.

== Taxonomy ==
The Australian bandfish was first formally described in 1899 by the Irish born Australian ichthyologist James Douglas Ogilby with the type locality given as Port Jackson, New South Wales. The specific name australis means "southern", as it the time Ogilby described it this was thought to be the southernmost species in the genus Cepola, as C. haastii of New Zealand was then placed in the monotypic Hypolycodes. The taxon currently regarded as Cepola australis may represent more than one species.

== Description ==
The Australian bandfish is an elongated fish with the rearmost soft rays of both the elongated dorsal and anal fins connected to its lanceolate caudal fin by a membrane to form a continuous fin. It has a relatively large eye and a blunt snout with an oblique mouth. The dorsal fin has 3 spines and 54-57 soft rays while the anal fin contains a single spine and 50-53 soft rays. there is a row of small teeth in each jaw with a second row of curved teeth in the anterior part of the upper and lower jaws. This species attains a maximum total length of 25 cm (9.8 in). They are reddish in colour, the colour varying between pink and red dependant on the depth the fish is at.

== Distribution and habitat ==
The Australian bandfish is endemic to Australia. It is found from northern Queensland, south on the eastern coast and east along the southern coast as far as eastern South Australia. They live in burrows in areas of sand and mud from the shallows down to a depth of 70 m (230 ft).

== Biology ==
Australian bandfish live in burrows and emerge from these burrows to feed on zooplankton like other bandfishes.
