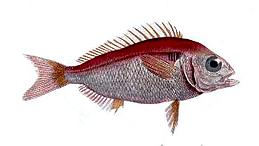

Conservation status
- Near Threatened (IUCN 3.1)

Scientific classification
- Kingdom: Animalia
- Phylum: Chordata
- Class: Actinopterygii
- Order: Acanthuriformes
- Family: Sparidae
- Genus: Pagellus
- Species: P. bogaraveo

Binomial name
- Pagellus bogaraveo (Brünnich, 1768)

Synonyms
- Aurata bilunulata Risso, 1827; Labrus calops Lacepède, 1801; Pagellus breviceps Valenciennes, 1830; Pagrus bugaravella Asso, 1827; Pagellus cantabricus (Asso, 1801); Pagellus centrodontus (Delaroche, 1809); Pagellus curtus Rafinesque, 1810; Sparus bogaraveo Brünnich, 1768; Sparus brunnichii Shaw, 1803; Sparus cantabricus Asso, 1801; Sparus centrodontus Delaroche, 1809

= Blackspot seabream =

Species of fish

The blackspot seabream (Pagellus bogaraveo), also known as the red seabream or besugo, is a species of marine ray-finned fish belonging to the family Sparidae, the seabreams and porgies. It is widespread in the Eastern Atlantic from Norway to Mauritania, including Macaronesia and the western Mediterranean. It is an important species to fisheries, and overfishing has led to it being classified as Near Threatened.

== Taxonomy ==
The blackspot seabream was first formally described as Sparus bogaraveo in 1768 by the Danish zoologist and mineralogist Morten Thrane Brünnich with its type locality given as Marseille. It was subsequently moved to Pagellus. The genus Pagellus is placed in the family Sparidae, which is placed in the order Spariformes by the 5th edition of Fishes of the World but in the order Acanthuriformes by the Catalog of Fishes. Some authorities classify this genus in the subfamily Pagellinae, but neither Fishes of the World nor the Catalog of Fishes recognizes subfamilies within Sparidae.

== Etymology ==
The specific name bogaraveo is derived from the local common name for this species in Marseille, bogue-raveo.

== Description ==
The blackspot seabream has a moderately deep body, a rounded snout and large eyes whose diameter is greater than the length of the snout. It has small sharp teeth and larger, flatter teeth set into the sides of the jaws. It has a long dorsal fin with 12 spines in the anterior portion and 12–13 branched rays in the posterior portion. The shorter anal fin has 3 spines and 12–13 branched rays. The pectoral fins are relatively long and have pointed tips. The back and upper flanks are reddish in color and the lower part of the body is silvery with a pinkish tinge. There is a black spot situated directly above the pectoral-fin base. The maximum recorded standard length is 70 centimetres (70 cm) but a more common standard length is 30 centimetres (30 cm). The largest published weight is 4 kg (8.8 lb).

== Distribution ==
The blackspot seabream is largely found in the waters of the eastern North Atlantic, from Norway to Cape Blanc in Mauritania. Its range extends into the western Mediterranean, as far as the Strait of Sicily and the Adriatic Sea. It is also found around the Canary Islands and the Azores and has been recorded off Iceland.

== Habitat and biology ==
The blackspot seabream occurs in inshore waters above different types of substrates, including rock, sand and mud. It ranges down to 400 m (1,300 ft) in the Mediterranean and down to 700 m (2,300 ft) in the Atlantic. The young fish are found near the coast while the adults are found on the continental slope, particularly over areas with a muddy substrate. The blackspot seabream is an omnivorous species, with a diverse diet of crustaceans, molluscs, small fish and plant matter.

The blackspot seabream is a protoandrous hermaphrodite. Hence, early in the lifecycle of this species, all individuals are male; then, between the ages of 2 and 7, individuals may become female. Maturity is reached at 4–5 years old, when the fish is about 22–25 cm (22–25 cm) in length. Spawning occurs throughout the year, with the peak being location-dependent. For example, it is August to October off the British Isles, but January to April in the Bay of Biscay. Farther south, the spawning peaks are in January to March off Morocco and in January to May in the Mediterranean. A female with standard length 31–41 cm (12–16 in) can lay 70,000–500,000 eggs. The blackspot seabream is a gregarious species which migrates to coastal waters to spawn.

== Relationship with humans ==
The blackspot seabream is an important food fish which is marketed fresh and frozen around the Mediterranean (but it also been used to produce fishmeal and oil). Fishing is done using trawls, trammel nets and bottom long lines. Fishing for this species is done on a semi-industrial basis or by artisanal fishermen; it is also a sport fish. It is regularly available in the fish markets of France, Spain, Morocco and mainland Italy, but is only occasionally found in fish markets in Sicily, Tunisia, Greece and Turkey. This species has shown declines in the stock and in the amounts landed, which has led the IUCN to classify this species as Near Threatened. It is grown in aquaculture off Spain.
