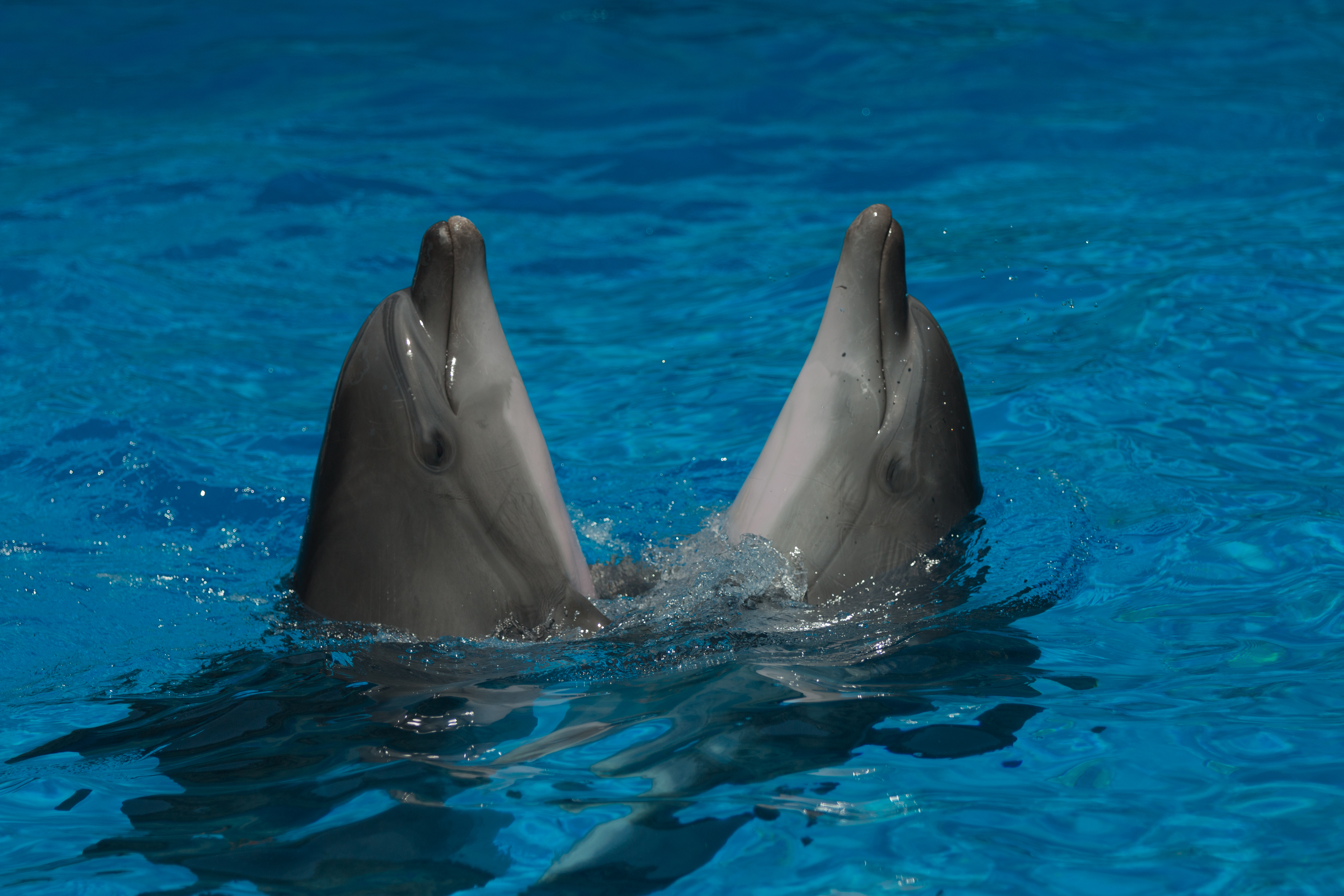

Conservation status
- Endangered (IUCN 3.1)

Scientific classification
- Kingdom: Animalia
- Phylum: Chordata
- Class: Mammalia
- Order: Artiodactyla
- Infraorder: Cetacea
- Family: Delphinidae
- Genus: Tursiops
- Species: T. truncatus
- Subspecies: T. t. ponticus

Trinomial name
- Tursiops truncatus ponticus (Barabash-Nikiforov, 1940)

= Black Sea bottlenose dolphin =

Black Sea bottlenose dolphin Temporal range: Holocene

Subspecies of dolphin

The Black Sea bottlenose dolphin (Tursiops truncatus ponticus) is a subspecies of the Atlantic or common bottlenose dolphin (T. t. truncatus) inhabiting the Black Sea of Eurasia, connected to the greater Mediterranean Sea by the Bosporus strait between Greece and Türkiye. Recent findings suggest that they differ from the common bottlenose dolphin based on slight differences in cranial activity and genetic composition. This subspecies is less-frequently studied than the common Atlantic bottlenose dolphin, the nominate subspecies.

== Ecology and behavior ==
Based on the range of the Black Sea bottlenose dolphin, their diet consists of many available coastal fish. This includes, but is not limited to, red mullet, flounder, mullet, anchovy, herring, horse mackerel and stingrays. The increasing dispersal and limits of pelagic fish off the coast of human settlements is likely the cause of the shift in the dolphins' diet to benthic fishes, bringing them closer to coastal areas where populations of prey are more readily available.

A study that investigated the group dynamics of Black Sea bottlenose dolphin individuals off of the coast of Crimea showed that the dolphins that live in the Black Sea have specific social-spatiotemporal structures that have allowed them to live cooperatively in this geographical region and help one another hunt for and find food sources. The use of echolocation tones and frequencies were tracked throughout the seasons of each year to find what kind of groups or individuals of sex and age occupy the region at a given time. The study found that Black Sea bottlenose dolphin populations live in groups of 2-10 individuals that do not separate based on distinct barriers from one another, rather than by more closely related individuals, such as a mother and her calves, and stress the importance of close-knit social structures in the Black Sea dolphins.

Studies of Black Sea bottlenose dolphin hematology also provided much insight into the chemistry of the bottlenose subspecies based on the environment they have occupied over time. In certain sample studies, analysis of dolphin blood showed that the chemical composition of these individuals is unique to the environment they occupy. This includes a total concentration of 156.48mmol/L of potassium concentration, 29.94micrommol/L iron concentration, 118.28mmol concentration of chloride as well as a 71.395g/L total protein concentration in the blood. Though this study was limited to individuals kept at the Lithuanian Sea Museum, it nevertheless showed no statistical significance in deviation from the entire population, showing a generalization of the chemical composition of the subspecies.

== Conservation ==
Black Sea bottlenose dolphins, Attica Zoological Park

The Black Sea is a flourishing area for tourist attractions such as boat rides that specialize in dolphin sightings. However these tours often move directly through the established territorial regions of some coastal populations. An increase in human intrusion creates population fragmentation that can damage the social relationships among grounds.

The safety and numbers of the Black Sea dolphins have been severely impacted by the destruction from the 2022 Russian invasion of Ukraine. Bombs have been dropped in coastal feeding areas and pollution from spilled oil and chemical runoff has increased sharply. Numerous reports from Turkey, Romania, and Ukraine have found thousands of dead dolphins washed up onto beaches. Russian Navy sonar and missile firings are also having a deleterious effect. Ukrainian scientists estimated that 50,000 died during 2022.
