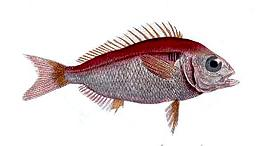
- Pagellus bogaraveo

Scientific classification
- Kingdom: Animalia
- Phylum: Chordata
- Class: Actinopterygii
- Order: Acanthuriformes
- Family: Sparidae
- Genus: Pagellus; Valenciennes, 1830

Type species
- Sparus erythrinus Linnaeus 1758

Species
- see text

Synonyms
- Nudipagellus Fowler, 1925

= Pagellus =

Pagellus Temporal range: Eocene–Holocene, 231.4 - 0 Mya

Genus of fishes

Pagellus is a genus of marine ray-finned fish belonging the family Sparidae, which includes the seabreams and porgies. These fishes are found in the eastern Atlantic Ocean, the Mediterranean Sea and the western Indian Ocean.

== Taxonomy ==
Pagellus was first proposed as a genus in 1830 by the French zoologist Achille Valenciennes. The type species was subsequently designated as Sparus erythrinus by Eugène Anselme Sébastien Léon Desmarest in 1856. Linnaeus described S. erythrinus in the 10th edition of Systema Naturae with its type locality given as the Mediterranean and America. This genus is placed in the family Sparidae within the order Spariformes by the 5th edition of Fishes of the World. Some authorities classify this genus in the subfamily Pagellinae, but the 5th edition of Fishes of the World does not recognise subfamilies within the Sparidae.

== Etymology ==
Pagellus is derived from pagel, one of the common names of the common pandora among sailors in Mediterranean coasts of the Provence and Languedoc regions of France (also known as pageau).

== Species ==
Pagellus contains the following species:

- Pagellus acarne (Risso, 1827) (Axillary seabream)
- Pagellus affinis Boulenger, 1888 (Arabian seabream)
- Pagellus bellottii Steindachner, 1882 (Red Pandora)
- Pagellus bogaraveo (Brünnich, 1768) (Blackspot seabream)
- Pagellus erythrinus (Linnaeus 1758) (Common pandora)
- Pagellus natalensis Steindachner, 1903 (Natal pandora)

== Characteristics ==
Pageluus seabreams are characterised by having an oblong-shaped body that is normally silvery pink in colour. The scales on the head extend to beyond the front of the eyes. The bases of the dorsal and anal fins are covered with a low sheath covered in scales. The largest of the six species in Pagellus is the blackspot seabream (P. bogaraveo) with a maximum published standard length of 70 cm (28 in) while the smallest is the Natal pandora (P. natalensis) with a maximum published total length of 30 cm (12 in).

== Distribution and habitat ==
Pagellus seabreams are found in the Eastern Atlantic and the Mediterranean Sea between the North Sea and Angola. with 2 species in the western Indian Ocean. These seabreams are demersal fish found over various substrates at depths from the shallows down to 700 m (2,300 ft).

== Fisheries ==
Pagellus seabreams are components of fisheries wherever they occur, although P. natalensis is too small to be targeted. However, the four eastern Atlantic species and P.affinis are targeted by commercial fisheries and are important food fish.
