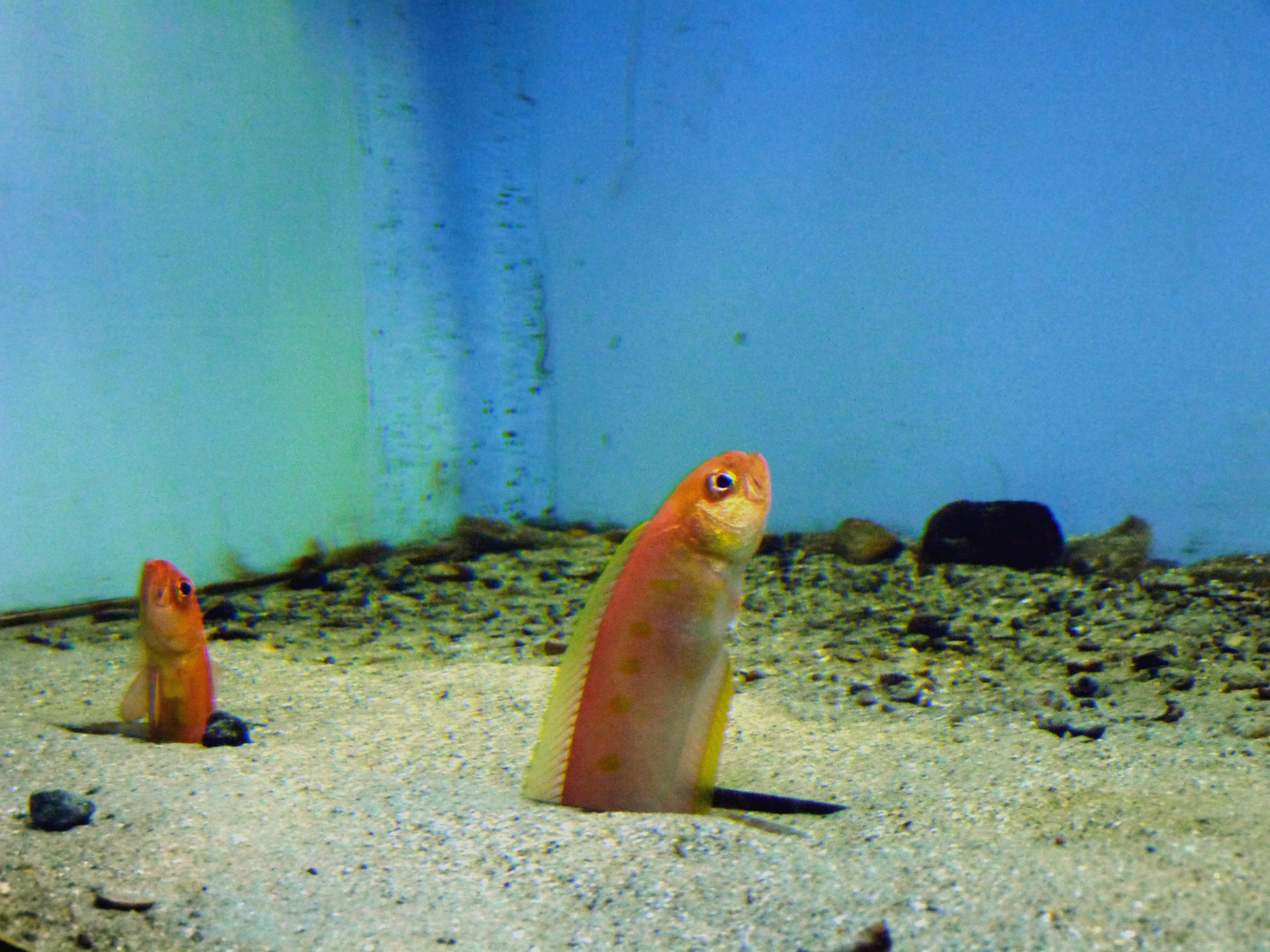

Scientific classification
- Kingdom: Animalia
- Phylum: Chordata
- Class: Actinopterygii
- Order: Acanthuriformes
- Family: Cepolidae
- Genus: Acanthocepola
- Species: A. krusensternii

Binomial name
- Acanthocepola krusensternii (Temminck & Schlegel, 1845)

Synonyms
- Cepola krusensternii Temminck & Schlegel, 1845; Acanthocepola krusensterni (Temminck & Schlegel, 1845)

= Acanthocepola krusensternii =

Species of fish

Acanthocepola krusensternii, the red-spotted bandfish, is a species of ray-finned fish in the Cepolidae family. The scientific name of the species was first validly published in 1845 by Coenraad Jacob Temminck and Hermann Schlegel.
