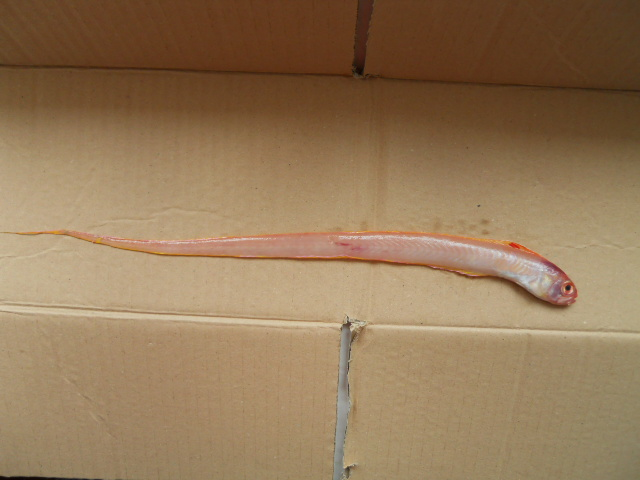
- Cepola macrophthalma

Scientific classification
- Kingdom: Animalia
- Phylum: Chordata
- Class: Actinopterygii
- Division: Teleostei
- Order: Acanthuriformes
- Family: Cepolidae
- Subfamily: Cepolinae
- Genus: Cepola; Linnaeus, 1764

Type species
- Ophidion macrophthalmum Linnaeus

Synonyms
- Hypolycodes Hector, 1881; Taenia Artedi, 1793

= Cepola =

Cepola Temporal range: Late Miocene to recent

Genus of fishes

Cepola is a genus of marine ray-finned fishes belonging to the bandfish family, Cepolidae. The name red bandfish is applied to all members of this genus, but particularly C. macrophthalma, and generally not C. australis, which is also known as the Australian bandfish.

== Taxonomy ==
Cepola was first formally described as a genus in 1764 by Carolus Linnaeus with Ophidion macrophthalmum as the type species by monotypy. The generic name Cepola means "little onion", Linnaeus did not explain why he chose this name. It is likely derived from cepollam or cepulam, which in 1686 was said by Francis Willughby to be local names among Roman fishermen for the similar "Fierasfer", a pearlfish, to which Linnaeus believed Cepola macrophthalma was related. As well as this, in 1872 Giovanni Canestrini reported that in Naples the common name for C. macropthalma is Pesce cipolia meaning "onion fish".

== Species ==
There are currently five recognized species in this genus:

- Cepola australis J. D. Ogilby, 1899 (Australian bandfish)
- Cepola haastii (Hector, 1881)
- Cepola macrophthalma (Linnaeus, 1758) (Red bandfish)
- Cepola pauciradiata Cadenat, 1950
- Cepola schlegelii Bleeker, 1854

The fossil species †Cepola cuneata Arambourg, 1927 is known from the latest Miocene (Messinian) of Algeria.

There may be a sixth species, as yet undescribed, from the waters near Bermuda.

== Characteristics ==
Cepola bandfishes are similar to Acanthocepola bandfishes, in that they have the last ray of the dorsal and anal fins connected to the caudal fin by a membrane. The differences are that they do not have spines on the margin of the preoperculum and they have naked, unscaled cheeks. The total length of these fishes vary from 25 cm (9.8 in) in CA. australis to 80 cm (31 in) in C. macrophthalma. They are normally pinkish or reddish in colour.

== Distribution, habitat and biology ==
Cepola bandfishes are found in the eastern Atlantic, Indian and Western Pacific Oceans, including the Mediterranean Sea. They create burrows in flat areas of sand and mud substrates, feeding on zooplankton.

== Cultural significance ==
The oldest recorded recipe is for C. macrophthalma. The original recipe book, by Mithaecus, is now lost, but the recipe itself survives thanks to being quoted in the Deipnosophistae.
