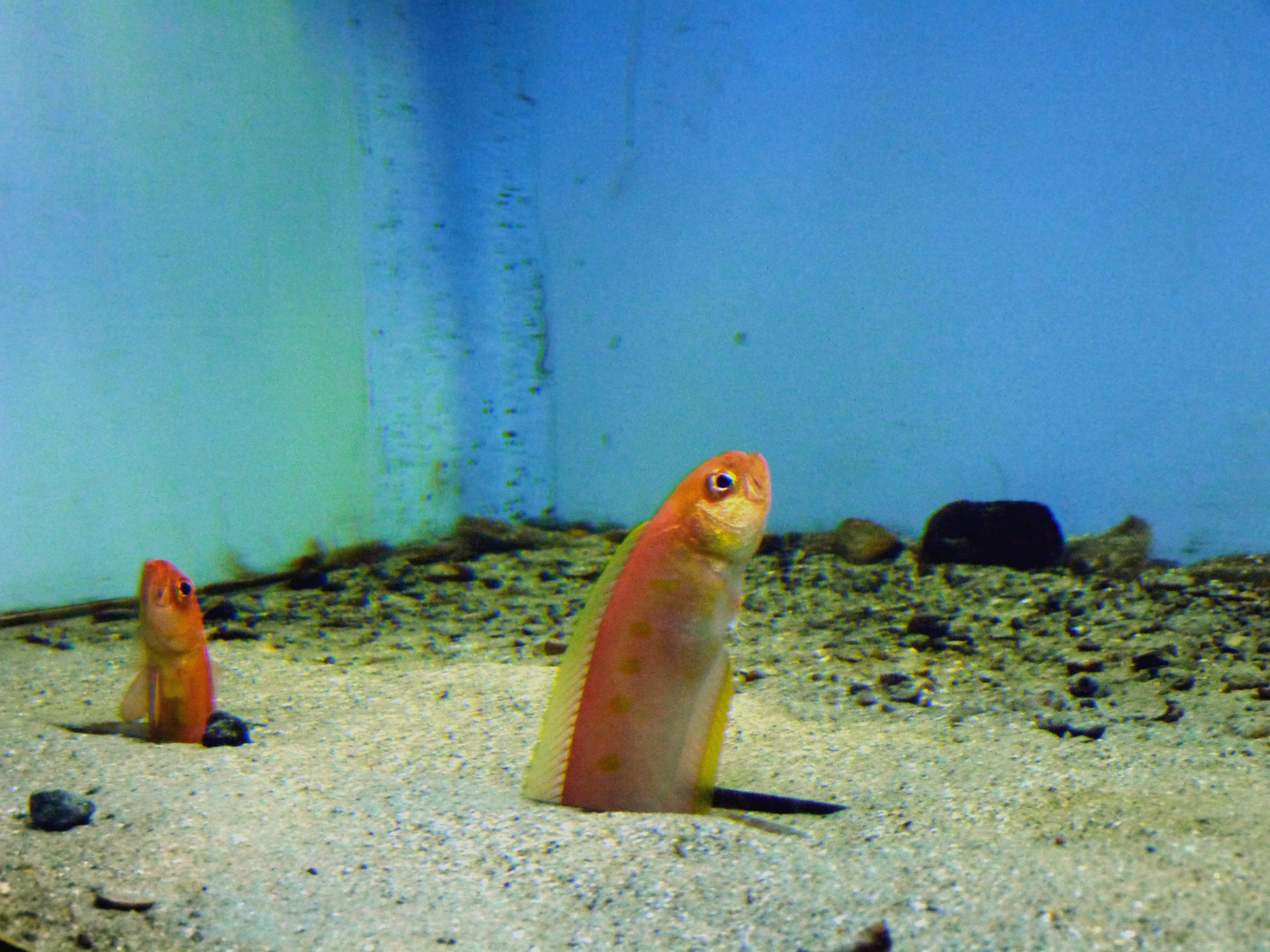
- Red-spotted bandfish (A. krusensternii)

Scientific classification
- Kingdom: Animalia
- Phylum: Chordata
- Class: Actinopterygii
- Division: Teleostei
- Order: Acanthuriformes
- Family: Cepolidae
- Subfamily: Cepolinae
- Genus: Acanthocepola; Bleeker, 1874

Type species
- Cepola krusensternii Temminck & Schlegel, 1845

= Acanthocepola =

Genus of fishes

Acanthocepola is a genus of marine ray-finned fishes belonging to the family Cepolidae, the bandfishes. They are native to the Indian Ocean and the western Pacific Ocean.

== Taxonomy ==
Acanthocepola is classified within the subfamily Cepolinae. The genus was first formally described in 1874 by the Dutch physician and ichthyologist Pieter Bleeker who designated Cepola krusensternii, which had been described by Coenraad Jacob Temminck & Hermann Schlegel in 1845, as the type species, although the genus was also monotypic. The genus name, Acanthocepola is a compound of acanthus meaning "spine" and Cepola the type genus of the family Cepolidae, a reference to the spines on the edge of the preoperculum.

== Species ==
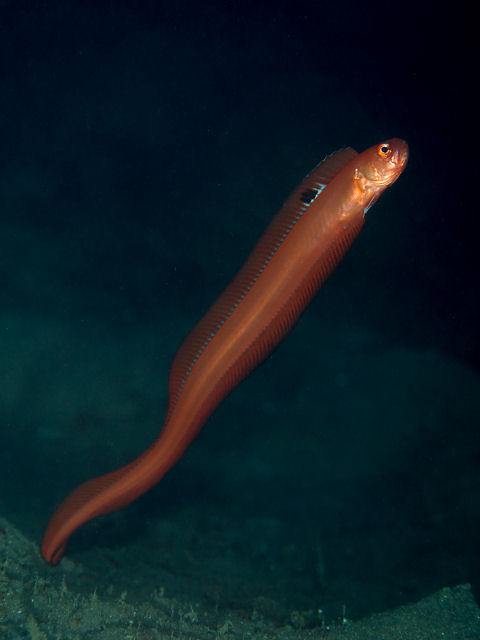
A. limbata

There are currently four recognized species in this genus:

- Acanthocepola abbreviata (Valenciennes, 1835) (Bandfish)
- Acanthocepola indica (F. Day, 1888) (Indian bandfish)
- Acanthocepola krusensternii (Temminck & Schlegel, 1845) (Red-spotted bandfish)
- Acanthocepola limbata (Valenciennes, 1835) (Blackspot bandfish)

== Characteristics ==
Acanthocepola bandfishes are similar to Cepola bandfishes, in that they have the last ray of the dorsal and anal fins connected to the caudal fin by a membrane. The differences are that they have spines on the margin of the preoperculum and scales on their cheeks.

The total length of these fishes vary from 30 cm (12 in) in A. abbreviata to 50 cm (20 in) in A. limbata. They are normally pinkish or reddish in colour.

== Distribution, habitat and biology ==
Acanthocepola bandfishes are found in the Indian and Western Pacific Oceans, from the coast of Eastern Africa east to the Western Central Pacific, north to Japan and south to Australia. They create burrows in flat areas of sand and mud substrates, feeding on zooplankton. They live as pairs hovering over their burrows, retreating to the burrow when alarmed. Juveniles can be found in small groups.

== Fisheries ==
Acanthocepola bandfishes are not targeted by fisheries but are caught as a bycatch.
