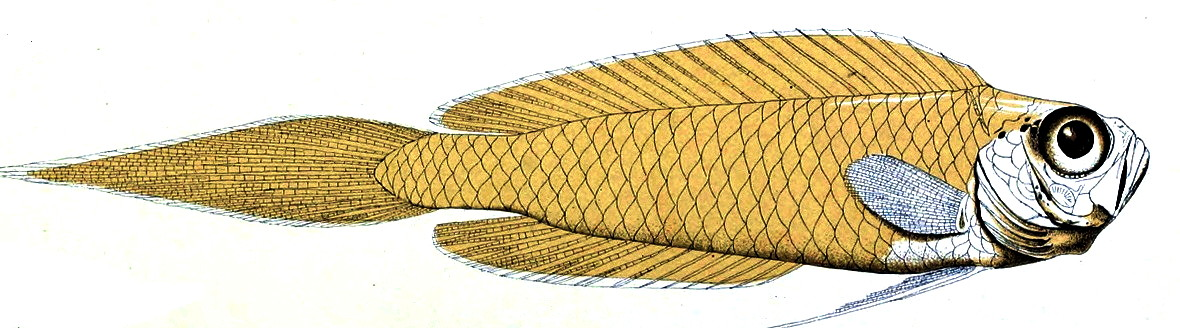
- Owstonia sibogae

Scientific classification
- Kingdom: Animalia
- Phylum: Chordata
- Class: Actinopterygii
- Order: Acanthuriformes
- Family: Cepolidae
- Subfamily: Owstoninae; Jordan, Tanaka & Snyder, 1913
- Genus: Owstonia; S. Tanaka, 1908

Type species
- Owstonia totomiensis Tanaka, 1908

Synonyms
- Parasphenanthias Gilchrist, 1922; Pseudocepola Kamohara, 1935; Sphenanthias Weber, 1913

= Owstonia =

Genus of fishes

Owstonia is a genus of marine ray-finned fish belonging to the family Cepolidae, the bandfishes. It is the only genus in the monotypic subfamily Owstoninae. They are found in deep waters of the Indian and Pacific Ocean.

== Taxonomy ==
Owstonia was described in 1908 by the Japanese ichthyologist Shigeho Tanaka with the type species designated as Owstonia totomiensis due to it being the only species in a monotypic genus at the time of its description. In 1913 Tanaka, along with the American ichthyologists David Starr Jordan and John Otterbein Snyder, created the family Owstonidae for this genus. The family was merged with the Cepolidae as a subfamily in 1956 and is now regarded as a subfamily, Owstoninae, of the Cepolidae. The name of the genus, Owstonia. means "belonging to Owston". This name refers to a specimen of O. totomiensis being found in the collection of Alan Owston.

== Species ==
There are currently 36 recognized species in this genus:

- Owstonia ainonaka Smith-Vaniz & G. D. Johnson, 2016
- Owstonia contodon Smith-Vaniz & G. D. Johnson, 2016
- Owstonia crassa Smith-Vaniz & G. D. Johnson, 2016
- Owstonia dispar Smith-Vaniz & G. D. Johnson, 2016
- Owstonia doryptera (Fowler, 1934)
- Owstonia elongata Smith-Vaniz & G. D. Johnson, 2016
- Owstonia fallax Smith-Vaniz & G. D. Johnson, 2016
- Owstonia geminata Smith-Vaniz & G. D. Johnson, 2016
- Owstonia grammodon (Fowler, 1934)
- Owstonia hastata Smith-Vaniz & G. D. Johnson, 2016
- Owstonia hawaiiensis Smith-Vaniz & G. D. Johnson, 2016
- Owstonia ignota Smith-Vaniz & G. D. Johnson, 2016
- Owstonia japonica Kamohara, 1935
- Owstonia kamoharai Endo, Y. C. Liao & Matsuura, 2015 (Kamohara's bandfish)
- Owstonia lepiota Smith-Vaniz & G. D. Johnson, 2016
- Owstonia maccullochi Whitley, 1934 (McCulloch's bandfish)
- Owstonia macrophthalma (Fourmanoir, 1985)
- Owstonia melanoptera Smith-Vaniz & G. D. Johnson, 2016
- Owstonia merensis Smith-Vaniz & G. D. Johnson, 2016
- Owstonia mundyi Smith-Vaniz & G. D. Johnson, 2016
- Owstonia nalani Smith-Vaniz & G. D. Johnson, 2016
- Owstonia nigromarginata (Fourmanoir, 1985)
- Owstonia nudibucca Smith-Vaniz & G. D. Johnson, 2016
- Owstonia psilos Smith-Vaniz & G. D. Johnson, 2016
- Owstonia raredonae Smith-Vaniz & G. D. Johnson, 2016
- Owstonia rhamma Smith-Vaniz & G. D. Johnson, 2016
- Owstonia sarmiento Y. C. Liao, Reyes & K. T. Shao, 2009
- Owstonia scottensis Smith-Vaniz & G. D. Johnson, 2016
- Owstonia sibogae (M. C. W. Weber, 1913) (Comb bandfish)
- Owstonia similis Smith-Vaniz & G. D. Johnson, 2016
- Owstonia simotera (J. L. B. Smith, 1968)
- Owstonia taeniosoma (Kamohara, 1935)
- Owstonia tosaensis Kamohara, 1934
- Owstonia totomiensis S. Tanaka, 1908 (Short-tail bandfish)
- Owstonia weberi (Gilchrist, 1922)
- Owstonia whiteheadi (Talwar, 1973) (Indian bandfish)

== Characteristics ==
Owstonia bandfishes differ from the two genera in the subfamily Cepolinae by being less elongate, having only 27-33 vertebrae and 19-26 soft rays in their dorsal fin. Their dorsal and anal fins not attached to the lanceoloate caudal fin. They vary in maximum total length from 5.4 cm (2.1 in) in O. nalani to 52 cm (20 in) in O. weberi.

== Distribution and habitat ==
Owstonia bandfishes are found in the Indo-Pacific region from the eastern coast of Africa as far east as Hawaii. They are found in deep water. Unlike the Cepoline bandfishes the fishes in Owstonia are not, other than one species, burrowers in soft substrates. They are found over rocky substrates swimming close to the bottom particularly on the upper continental slope, around atolls or oceanic fragments of crust. The exception is O. taeniosoma which has a more elongated body than its congeners and is found over sand or mud bottoms on the continental shelf.
