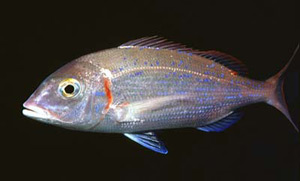

Conservation status
- Least Concern (IUCN 3.1)

Scientific classification
- Kingdom: Animalia
- Phylum: Chordata
- Class: Actinopterygii
- Division: Teleostei
- Order: Acanthuriformes
- Family: Sparidae
- Genus: Pagellus
- Species: P. erythrinus

Binomial name
- Pagellus erythrinus (Linnaeus, 1758)
- Distribution of Pagellus erythrinus

Synonyms
- Sparus erythrinus Linnaeus, 1758; Pagellus erythrinus Valenciennes, 1830

= Common pandora =

Species of fish

The common pandora (Pagellus erythrinus), also known as king of the breams, pandora, red pandora or Spanish seabream, is a species of marine ray-finned fish belonging to the family Sparidae, which includes the seabreams and porgies. This fish is found in the eastern Atlantic Ocean and the Mediterranean Sea. It is an esteemed fish to eat.

== Taxonomy ==
The common pandora was first formally described as Sparus erythrinus by Carl Linnaeus in the 10th edition of Systema Naturae published in 1758 with its type locality given as the Mediterranean and America. The genus Pagellus is placed in the family Sparidae within the order Spariformes by the 5th edition of Fishes of the World. Some authorities classify this genus in the subfamily Pagellinae, but the 5th edition of Fishes of the World does not recognise subfamilies within the Sparidae.

== Etymology ==
The common pandora has the specific name erythrinus which means "red", a reference to the pinkish colour of this fish.

== Description ==
The common pandora has an oval, compressed body with a straight dorsal profile to the head. The eye has a diameter that is clearly shorter than the length of the snout. The scales on the head extend forward to the level of the front edge of the eyes. The cheeks are scaled while the preoperculum is naked. The fleshy lipped mouth is low and slightly oblique and there are pointed teeth in the front of the jaws while the teeth in the rear of the jaws are molar-like with a band of numerous comb-like teeth inside them. The upper jaw has 2 or 3, sometimes 4, rows of molars while the lower jaws have 2, infrequently 3 rows. The dorsal fin is supported by 12 spines and 10 or 11 soft rays while the anal fin contains 3 spines and 8 or 9 soft rays. The overall colour is bright pink with a scattering of small blue spots on the upper flanks. The upper margin of the gill cover is carmine and there is a reddish spot on the base of the pectoral fin. There is sometimes a dark red mark at the rear end of the dorsal fin. The common pandora has a maximum published total length of 60 cm (24 in), although 25 cm (9.8 in) is more typical, and a maximum published weight of 3.2 kg (7.1 lb).

== Distribution and habitat ==
The common pandora has a wide range along the eastern shores of the Atlantic Ocean, from the coast of West Africa from Guinea Bissau north to the Strait of Gibraltar including Cape Verde, Madeira and the Canary Islands, throughout the Mediterranean Sea and into the western Black Sea and extends northward in the North Sea as far as Norway. In terms of genetic diversity, there appears to be a high level of connectivity from the Atlantic through the Mediterranean. This demersal fish occurs at depths down to 300 m (980 ft), although it is typically found no deeper than 100 m (330 ft), over sand, mud, rock and gravel substrates. Young fish are found farther inshore than the adults.

== Biology ==
The common pandora is a protogynous hermaphroditism in which the females change sex to become males when they reach lengths between 12.8 and 20.3 cm (5.0 and 8.0 in). This sex change typically when they are 3–4 years old, however, this is not always true as small males and even large females are often recorded. The spawning season for this species runs from April to September, peaking in May and June. However, the peak spawning period varies from region to region.

A study in the central Adriatic Sea found that the prey of common pandora came from seven major groups, these were decapod crustaceans, bivavlves, polychaetes, krill, bony fishes, mysids and cephalopods. The most important prey found in the stomachs were decapods, particularly in medium-sized specimens while both decapods and bony fishes were the dominant prey in larger fish with a total length in excess of 21 cm (8.3 in) while the smallest fishes, with total lengths between 13 and 21 cm (5.1 and 8.3 in) ate mainly polychaetes. Overall the most frequent prey were the shrimps Alpheus dentipes and Processa canaliculata and the polychaete worm Aphrodite aculata.

As most fishes, the common pandora harbours a variety of parasites; for example, the nematode Philometra filiformis is a parasite of the ovary of this fish.

== Fisheries ==
The common pandora is an important target species for fisheries in the Mediterranean and Atlantic and there are indications that the stocks are being overfished in a number of areas of the Mediterranean. In Italy this species is one of the most important species of Sparid landed but the total landing has declined from 1,900 t (1,900 long tons; 2,100 short tons) in 2004 to 850 t (840 long tons; 940 short tons) in 2010. The EU has set a minimum size limit for this species being landed of a total length of 150 mm (5.9 in). This fish is caught using fish traps in the Canary Islands as well as bottom trawls, beach seines, line gears, trammel nets and gill nets. The fish landed are found in markets throughout the Mediterranean as the fish is highly valued, and is sold fresh or preserved as smoked fish, frozen fish and dried and salted fish, as well as being used to make fish meal and fish oil. It is also an important quarry for recreational anglers.
