= Mithaecus =

Ancient Greek chef and food writer

Mithaecus (Ancient Greek: Μίθαικος) was a cook and cookbook author of the late 5th century BC. A Greek-speaking native of Sicily, Magna Graecia, at a time when the island was rich and highly civilized, Mithaecus is credited with having brought knowledge of Sicilian gastronomy to Greece. Specifically, according to sources of varying reliability, he worked in Sparta, from which he was expelled as a bad influence, and in Athens. He earned an unfavourable mention in Plato's dialogue Gorgias.

Mithaecus is the first known author of any cookbook, and his is the first known (if not extant) Greek cookbook. One very brief recipe survives from it, thanks to a quotation in the Deipnosophistae of Athenaeus. It is in the Doric dialect of Greek (appropriate both to Greek Sicily and to Sparta) and describes, in one line, how to deal with the fish Cepola macrophthalma, a ribbon-like fish here called tainia (known in Italian as cepola and in modern Greek as kordella):

Tainia: gut, discard the head, rinse, slice; add cheese and [olive] oil.

The addition of cheese seems to have been a controversial matter; Archestratus is quoted as warning his readers that Syracusan cooks spoil good fish by adding cheese.
