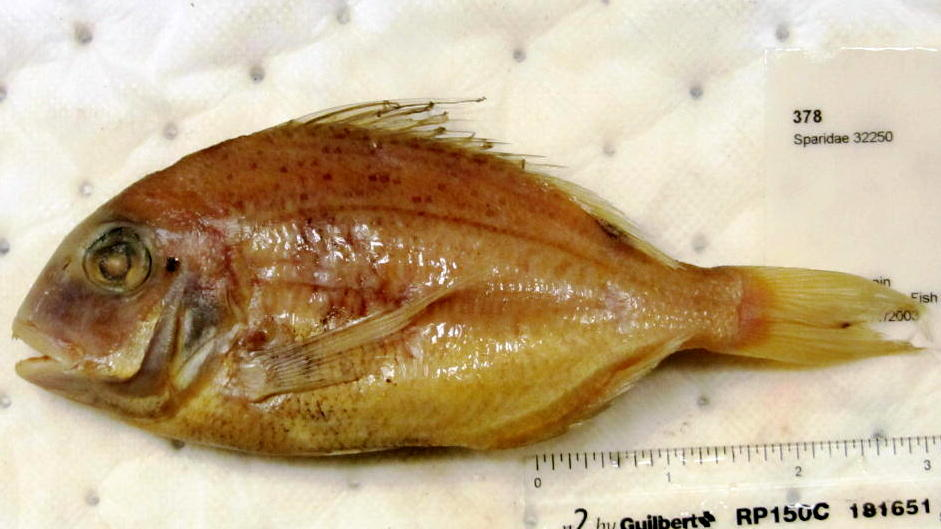

Conservation status
- Least Concern (IUCN 3.1)

Scientific classification
- Kingdom: Animalia
- Phylum: Chordata
- Class: Actinopterygii
- Order: Acanthuriformes
- Family: Sparidae
- Genus: Pagellus
- Species: P. bellottii

Binomial name
- Pagellus bellottii Steindachner, 1882

Synonyms
- Pagellus bellottii bellottii Steindachner, 1882; Dentex cuninghamii Regan, 1905; Pagellus coupei Dieuzeide, 1960

= Pagellus bellottii =

Species of fish

Pagellus bellottii, the red pandora, is a species of marine ray-finned fish belonging to the family Sparidae, the sea breams and porgies. This species is found in the eastern Atlantic Ocean and the Mediterranean Sea.

== Taxonomy ==
Pagellus bellottii was first formally described in 1882 by the Austrian ichthyologist Franz Steindachner with its type localities given as the Arglim Bank in the Canary Islands and Gorée in Senegal. The genus Pagellus is placed in the family Sparidae within the order Spariformes by the 5th edition of Fishes of the World. Some authorities classify this genus in the subfamily Pagellinae, but the 5th edition of Fishes of the World does not recognise subfamilies within the Sparidae.

== Etymology ==
Pagellus bellottii has a specific name which honours the biologist and paleontologist Cristoforo Bellotti of the Museo Civico di Storia Naturale di Milano who collected the type specimen and supplied Steindachner with specimens from the museum's collection.

== Description ==
Pagellus bellottii has an oblong, laterally compressed body with a large head which has a convex dorsal profile, more defined in adults.There are scales on the cheeks and gill cover and the scales on the head extend as far as the front of the eyes. The small, terminal mouth is slightly oblique and there is a band of at least 8 conical and slender teeth in the front of each jaw and two rows of molar-like teeth at the back of the jaws. There is a single dorsal fin which is supported by 12 spines and between 9 and 11 soft rays, with the last spine and the first ray being roughly equal in height, while the anal fin has 3 spines and 10 soft rays. The pectoral fins are long and pointed with the pelvic fins immediately posterior to the pectoral fins. The caudal fin is forked. The overall colour is red with silvery tints, with blue spots frequently showing along the scale rows on the flanks. The space between the eyes is also darker. There is a small red spot at the front end of the lateral line and upper edge of the gill cover. The pectoral fin has a dark base. The colour of the fins in specimens from the Gulf of Guinea are yellowish, otherwise they are greyish. There is a red or orange margin on the caudal fin. The red pandora has a maximum published total length of 42 cm (17 in), although 25 cm (9.8 in) is more typical.

== Distribution and habitat ==
Pagellus bellottii is found in the eastern AtlanticOcean from the ]Straits of Gibraltar and the Canary Islands south along the western coast of Africa as far as Angola. It was first recorded in the Mediterranean in 1960, off the coasts of Morocco and Algeria, where it was named as Pagellus coupei and has since been recorded off Spain and as far east as Israel and Syria. The red pandora is a demersal fish found at depths between 1 and 250 m (3 ft 3 in and 820 ft 3 in) over both hard and soft substrates.

== Biology ==
Pagellus bellottii is mainly carnivorous and its diet includes crustaceans, cephalopods, small fish, Amphioxus and worms. It is a schooling fish, especially at depths of less than 100 m (330 ft). This species attains sexual maturity at between 1 and 4 years old, spawning occurs intermittently from May to November. If it breeds in the Mediterranean then it is thought to be during the summer that it spawns. It is a protogynous hermaphrodite.

== Fisheries ==
Pagellus bellottii is one of the most important target species for commercial fisheries along the coast of western Africa. Off Senegal it is a target for commercial fisheries and is the most abundant commercially targeted demersal species in that region. In southern Mauritania it represented 85% of the seabream catch landed and in Ghana it was the most valuable species landed during the 1980s. The IUCN reports that there have been marked declines in the stocks of this species in West Africa.
