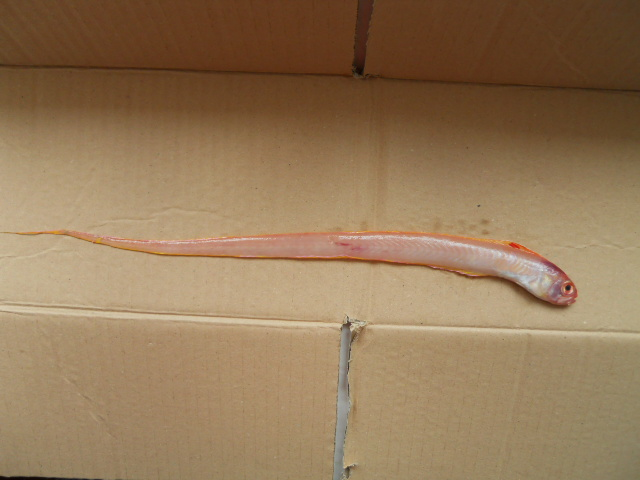

Conservation status
- Least Concern (IUCN 3.1)

Scientific classification
- Kingdom: Animalia
- Phylum: Chordata
- Class: Actinopterygii
- Division: Teleostei
- Order: Acanthuriformes
- Family: Cepolidae
- Genus: Cepola
- Species: C. macrophthalma

Binomial name
- Cepola macrophthalma (Linnaeus, 1758)
- Distribution of Cepola macrophthalma: dark blue: common; light blue: uncommon

Synonyms
- Ophidion macrophthalmum Linnaeus, 1758; Cepola rubescens Linnaeus, 1758; Cepola taenia Linnaeus, 1766; Cepola serpentiformis Lacépède, 1800; Cepola marginata Rafinesque, 1810; Cepola longicauda Swainson, 1839; Cepola truncata Swainson, 1839; Cepola jugularis Swainson, 1839; Cepola gigas Swainson, 1839; Cepola attentuata Swainson, 1839; Cepola novemradiata Swainson, 1839

= Cepola macrophthalma =

Species of fish

Cepola macrophthalma is a species of marine ray-finned fish belonging to the family Cepolidae, the bandfishes. It is found in the eastern Atlantic and Mediterranean from Senegal north to the British Isles. This species is known as the red bandfish, though this name is also given to other members of the genus Cepola.

== Taxonomy ==
Cepola macrophthalma was first formally described as Ophidion macrophthalmum in 1758 by Carl Linnaeus with the type locality given as Algiers. In 1764 Linnaeus described the genus Cepola with O. macrophthalmum as its type species by monotypy. The specific name, macrophthalma is a compound of macro meaning "large" and ophthalmus which means "eyed", a reference to the large eyes which are larger than a third of the length of the head.

== Distribution ==
It is found on the coast and inner continental shelf of the eastern Atlantic between northern Senegal and Scotland and the Mediterranean west of the Aegean Sea and the Nile Delta. It can be found on sandy and muddy ocean bottoms at depths of between 10 and 400 metres (33 and 1,312 ft).

== Description ==
Cepola macrophthalma has a thin, ribbon-like body, which tapers to a pointed tail. It is red in color, with an orange or yellow underside. It has large, silvery eyes. Its dorsal and anal fins stretch the length of its body and are connected to the caudal fin by a membrane creating an almost continuous fin. It has a large mouth, at an oblique angle, with thin, glassy, widely spaced teeth.

These fish are highly variable in length, but an average length is 40.0 cm total length (15.7 in). The maximum length recorded for this species is 80.0 cm total length (31.5 in). Taxonomic distinguishing features include 67–70 dorsal fin soft rays, 60 anal fin soft rays, two unsegmented dorsal fin rays, and a caudal fin with long median rays free at the tips.

== Ecology and behavior ==
Little was known of the behavior of this species until a population was discovered off the coast of the island of Lundy off the coast of Devon. Since then, many studies have been conducted on the population there, and on captive fish from Lundy. The population at Lundy once comprised around 14,000 individuals, but numbers have dropped severely, despite a ban on fishing in Lundy's waters.

These fish are burrowers, and they feed largely like garden eels, sticking their bodies out of their burrows to catch zooplankton. Unlike garden eels, they are not fixed in their burrows, but can move about both inside their burrows and in the open. Their burrows have funnel-shaped openings, due to the large quantities of sediments they displace to construct their burrows, and they consist largely of single elliptical vertical shafts with a chamber at the bottom. The burrows reach depths of up to 1 metre (39 in), and 49 centimetres (19 in) is considered to be typical. Bandfish excavate and maintain their burrows at dawn or dusk, with their mouth, and by pushing mud about with their body. They displace about three litres (three quarters of a gallon) of mud and sand in the excavation of a single burrow, and they take around six hours to construct their burrows. Their burrows often connect with those of the crab Goneplax rhomboides and other burrowing fish and crustaceans, and these associations may be deliberate.

Bandfish are an important part of the diets of many oceanic predators, especially John Dories, but also other fish, common dolphins and the musky octopus, Eledone moschata. Bandfish may have taken up an ecological niche burrowing and eating zooplankton due to strong pressures from predators.

== As food ==
Historically, this species was an important food fish. A recipe for this species is found in the earliest cookbook, by the Greek cook Mithaecus, and is quoted in the Deipnosophistae of Athenaeus. Andrew Dalby translated it as follows:

Tainia: gut, discard the head, rinse, slice; add cheese and oil.

Tainia was the name by which the ancient Greeks called Cepola macrophthalma, and the oil was olive oil. In modern times the species is of a lesser importance. In some countries (such as Italy and Spain) it is still consumed, but in others (such as Greece) it is generally discarded when caught by fishermen trying to catch more desirable species. The fish is prized by British deep-sea anglers, and poaching by anglers is a major threat to the population at Lundy.

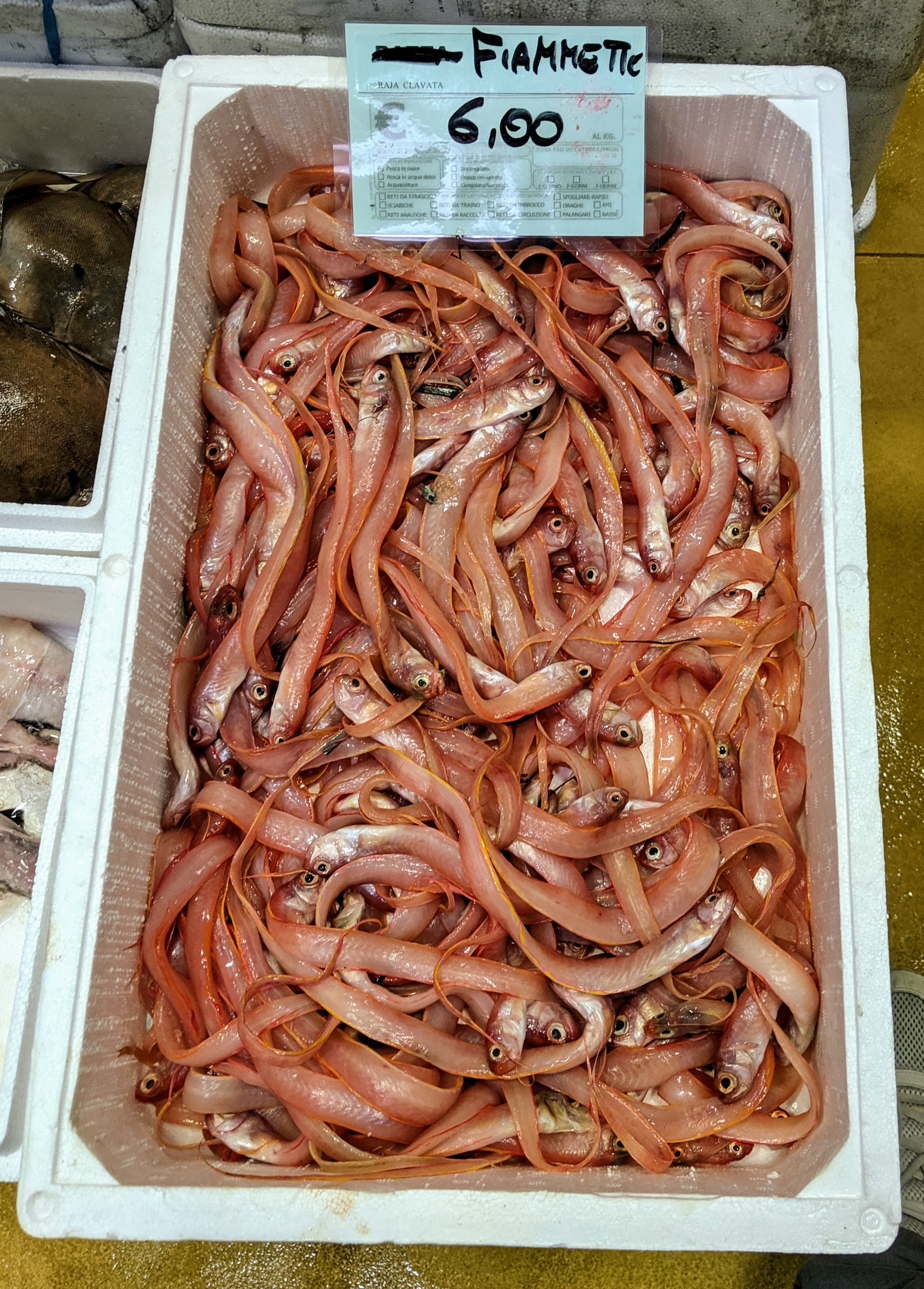
At the market in Italy in the 2019; Fiammette is the common name
