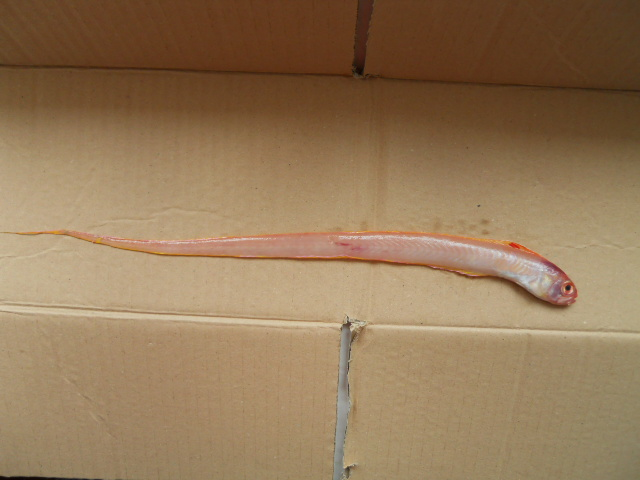
- Cepola macrophthalma

Scientific classification
- Kingdom: Animalia
- Phylum: Chordata
- Class: Actinopterygii
- Order: Acanthuriformes
- Family: Cepolidae; Rafinesque, 1810

Subfamilies
- See text

= Bandfish =

Family of fishes

The bandfishes, family Cepolidae, are 23 species of marine ray-finned fishes, They are native to the East Atlantic and Indo-Pacific where they dig burrows in sandy or muddy seabeds and eat zooplankton.

== Taxonomy ==
The bandfishes belong to the family Cepolidae, of the order acanthuriformes. The family was created in 1810 by the French naturalist Constantine Samuel Rafinesque. The placement of the Cepolidae within the Perciformes is not agreed by all authors, some authors place the family with the Priacanthidae in the order Priacanthiformes, an order which is considered to be incertae sedis within the series Eupercaria.

=== Subfamilies and genera ===
The family Cepolidae has 23 species which are arranged into two subfamilies and three genera as follows:

- Subfamily Cepolinae Rafinesque, 1815
  - Genus Acanthocepola Bleeker, 1874
  - Genus Cepola Linnaeus, 1764
- Subfamily Owstoninae Jordan, Tanaka & Snyder, 1913
  - Genus Owstonia Tanaka, 1908

Some authorities recognise an additional two genera Pseudocephala and Sphenanthias but these are regarded as synonyms of Owstonia by others.

=== Etymology ===
The family name, Cepolidae, is derived from the name coined in 1764 by Linnaeus for the type genus, Cepola and means "little onion", Linnaeus did not explain why he chose this name. It is likely derived from cepollam or cepulam, which in 1686 was said by Francis Willughby to be local names among Roman fishermen for the similar "Fierasfer", a pearlfish, to which Linnaeus believed Cepola macrophthalma was related. As well as this, in 1872 Giovanni Canestrini reported that in Naples the common name for C. macropthalma is Pesce cipolia meaning "onion fish".

=== Homonymy ===
The name Cepolidae Rafinesque, 1815 is a senior homonym for the family Cepolidae Ihering, 1909 a family of land snails belonging to the superfamily Helicoidea. The case needs be submitted to the International Commission on Zoological Nomenclature to resolve the homonymy.

== Characteristics ==
The bandfishes are characterised by the possession of a continuous dorsal fin with anything between 0 and 4 spines, frequently 3, spines and an anal fin which has 0 to 2 spines. The lanceolate caudal fin is usually joined to the dorsal and anal fins. There is a single pair of postcleithra and there are 6 branchiostegal rays. The lateral line lies along the base of the dorsal fin. The epineural ribs in some of the vertebrae of the trunk are fused where they are closest to the corresponding pleural ribs. The overall colour of the body s normally red or pink. The maximum length attained is 70 cm (28 in) in Cepola rubescens. They have a large oblique mouth, normally equipped with a single row of thin weakly curved teeth on each jaw, there are no vomerine teeth or palatine teeth. They have large eyes. They have cycloid scales which have crenulated edges. The distal pelvic fin rays are unbranched, the remaining proximal four rays are branched.

== Distribution ==
The bandfishes are found in the Eastern Atlantic Ocean, including the Mediterranean Sea and the Indo-West Pacific region, as far south as New Zealand.

== Biology ==
The bandfishes are mostly fossorial, creating burrows in areas with fine sand or mud substrates. They leave these burrows to feed on zooplankton in the water column. The lay pelagic eggs.

== Cultural references ==
The oldest recipe by a named author involves the preparation of a bandfish. The original recipe book, by Mithaecus, is now lost, but the recipe itself survives thanks to being quoted in the Deipnosophistae.
