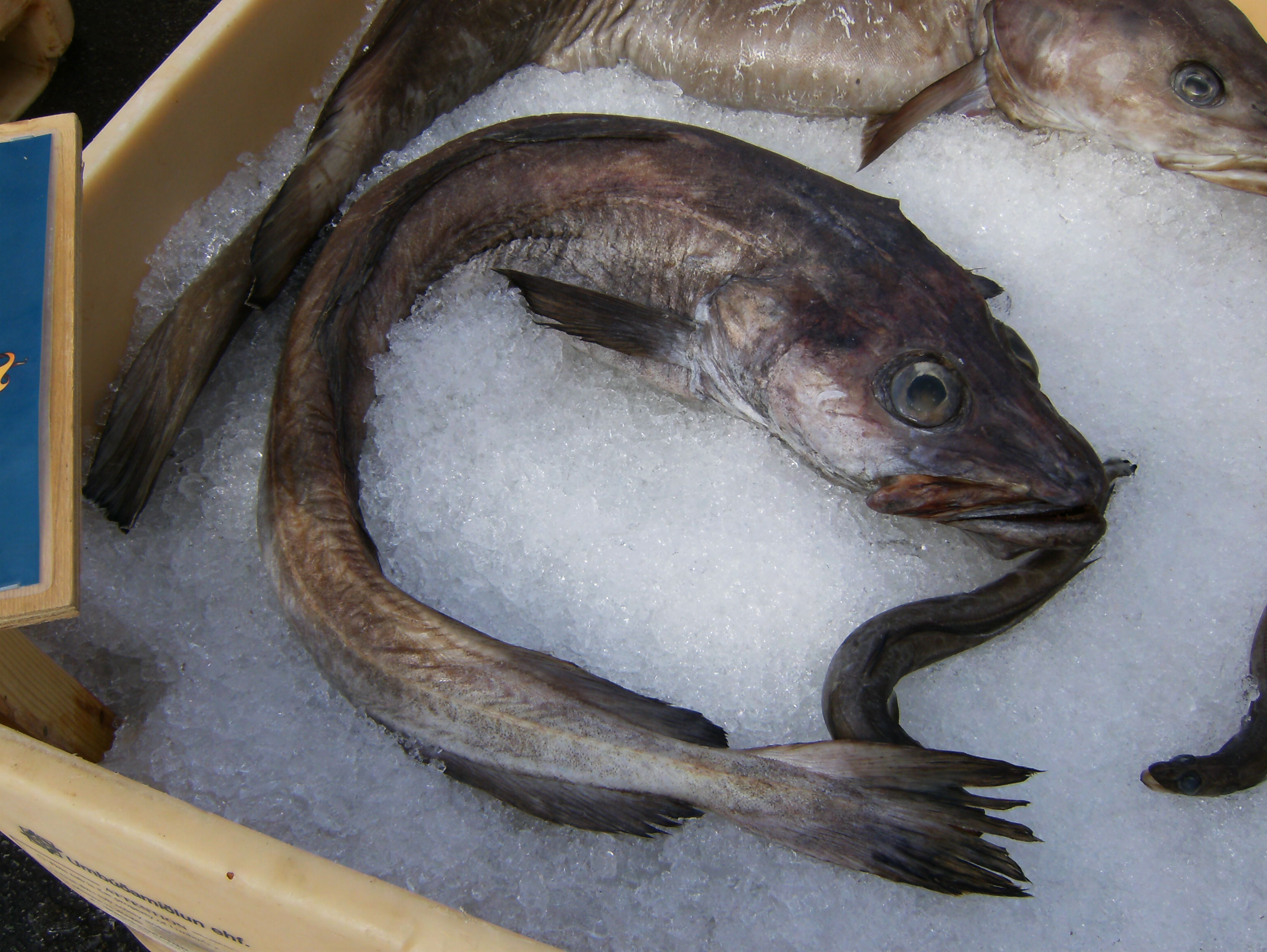

Scientific classification
- Kingdom: Animalia
- Phylum: Chordata
- Class: Actinopterygii
- Order: Gadiformes
- Family: Lotidae
- Genus: Molva
- Species: M. dypterygia

Binomial name
- Molva dypterygia (Pennant, 1784)

Synonyms
- Blennius tridactylus Lacepède, 1800; Gadus abyssorum Nilsson, 1832; Gadus byrkelange Walbaum, 1792; Gadus danicus Bonnaterre, 1788; Gadus dypterygius Pennant, 1784; Molva abyssorum (Nilsson, 1832)

= Blue ling =

Species of fish

The blue ling (Molva dypterygia) is a marine ray-finned fish in the family Lotidae (which is related to the cod family Gadidae). It is found in the North Atlantic and the Mediterranean Sea, and is commercially important.

== Taxonomy ==
The blue ling was first described as Gadus dypterygius by the Welsh naturalist Thomas Pennant in 1784; Pennant referred to earlier work by Otto Friedrich Müller in the description. It was Müller who came up with the term "dypterygius" (meaning "two little fins" in Greek and referring to the two dorsal fins that this species possesses) first, but his full name for this species was much longer and hence was not deemed to be a binomial name.

== Description ==
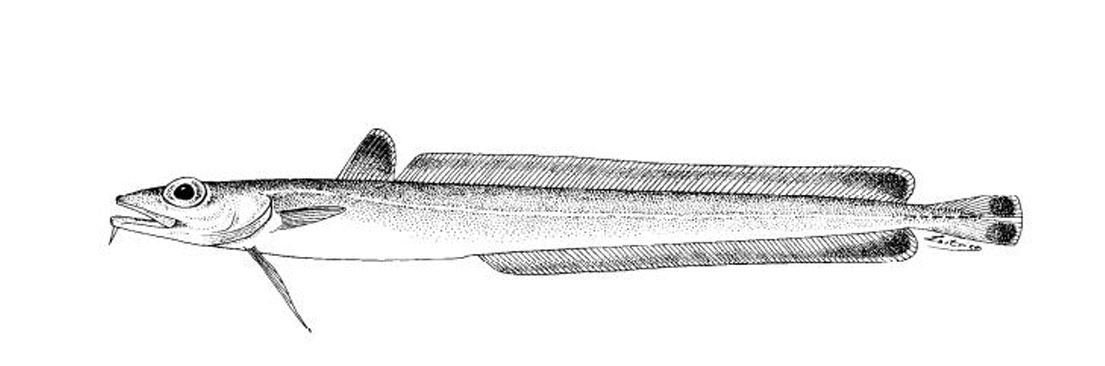
Drawing of the blue ling

Like other species of lings, the blue ling is an elongated fish. It can grow up to 155 cm in length, but a more typical length is 70–110 cm; the related common ling (Molva molva) may grow up to 200 cm in length, in contrast. Also, its chin barbel is much shorter than that of the common ling, and does not exceed the diameter of the eye. The blue ling can be distinguished from the third species in the genus, the Spanish ling (Molva macrophthalma), by observing the pectoral fins: in the blue ling, the tip of these fins is posterior to the end of the pelvic fins.

The three species in Molva can also be distinguished from each other through meristics, as detailed by the following table:

	Blue ling	Spanish ling	Common ling
Soft rays (first dorsal fin)	11-15	10-12 (rarely 12)	13-16
Soft rays (second dorsal fin)	69-83	74-82	57-70
Anal rays	62-81	70-79	55-67
Vertebrae	72-79	/	62-67

== Distribution and habitat ==
The blue ling is found in many areas of the North Atlantic, including the Barents Sea, the coast of Norway, Denmark, Greenland and Iceland, the Faroe Islands, the British Isles, and parts of the coast of Canada and the US (from Labrador to Cape Cod). It is also found in the Mediterranean Sea. In the northeast Atlantic, the blue ling is divided into three different stocks (a stock is a population of a single fish species large enough to be self-sustaining, and which does not interbreed much with other populations). The first is found in Icelandic and Greenlandic waters (bli.27.5a14); the second is found in the Celtic Seas, the Faroe Islands and so on (bli.27.5b6712); and the third is found in the Barents Sea, the North Sea, the Skagerrak, the Kattegat and so on (bli.27.123a4). These stocks exhibit differences in length, growth, and maturity rates.

The blue ling is considered to be a benthic or benthopelagic fish, and prefers a muddy seabed and murky waters. It has been observed living at depths of up to 1500 m, but is more typically found in shallower waters. For instance, in West Greenland, the typical depth range is 220–485 m, in Newfoundland and Labrador this is 236–550 m, and in the Faroe Islands this is 300–800 m.

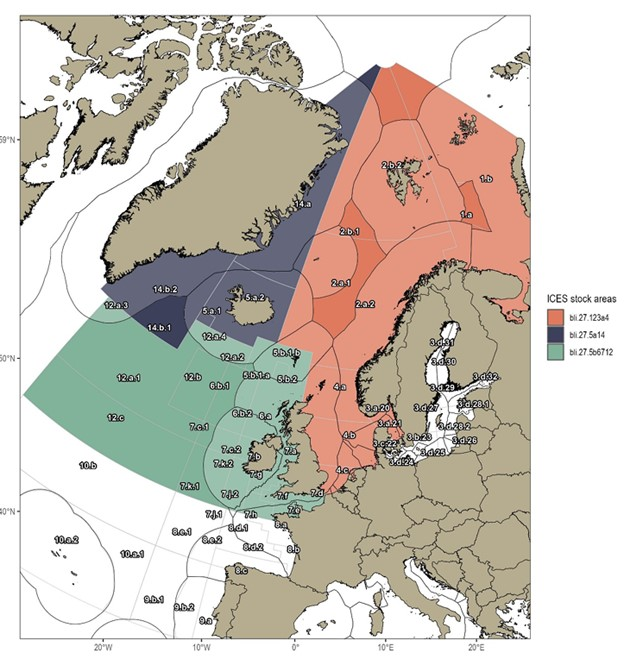
The three stocks of the blue ling

== Life history and biology ==
The blue ling is mainly a piscivorous predator (feeding on flatfishes, gobies and rocklings), though crustaceans and cephalopods are also consumed. It lives for 20–30 years, with females living for slightly longer than males on average. Sexual maturity is thought to be reached between 6–12 years old. During the first years of their lives, males and females are similar in size, but later in life females tend to grow faster than males.

Spawning occurs between April and May at depths of 500–1000 m from Scotland to Norway, and during these times the blue ling can form very large congregations. In the Mediterranean, the blue ling tends to spawn in slightly shallower waters (500–600 m).

== Management ==
The blue ling is commercially fished in the northeast Atlantic as its flesh is prized in many European countries and regions. Fisheries have negatively affected their populations through the 1990s in all described stocks. In the 1950s and 60s, Norway landed 1000–2000 tons per year, with seasonal fisheries targeting spawning aggregations from the 70s to 90s. Since then, regulations have been implemented to prevent further population depletion.

Fisheries are restricted to coastal state exclusive economic zones, and hence, management measures are not taken by the North East Atlantic Fisheries Commission, (NEAFC). In 2009, the EU designated protection for spawning habitat on the edge of the Scottish continental shelf and at the edge of Rosemary Bank for three months during the spawning season. In Norwegian waters, the blue ling is allowed as bycatch only (10%), which has had the same effect as closed areas regulation given avoidance of spawning habitat by fisheries. There is no total allowable catch (TAC) for the blue ling in Norwegian waters and TAC is set every other year in the EU and the UK.

There is no species specific management for the Faroese fleets, though efforts to limit fishing have been made through the use of licensing and with a minimum landing size of 60 cm in size. Fleets specifically targeting the blue ling is allocated a total allowable number of fishing days to be used in the demersal area, with a recommended minimum landing size of 60 cm. No enforcement is in place due to the discard ban in this area. In 2020, an agreement between Norway and the Faroe Islands permitted 2500 tons of ling as bycatch in bottom fishery in Faroese waters. Quotas of the blue ling (and other species) for EU vessels fishing in Faroese waters in 2020 was 1855 tons.

The ICES advised that catches should be no more than 4157 tons per year for 2020 and 2021. Continued exploitation of the blue ling is mostly influenced by regulation that is aimed at other species like cod or haddock.
