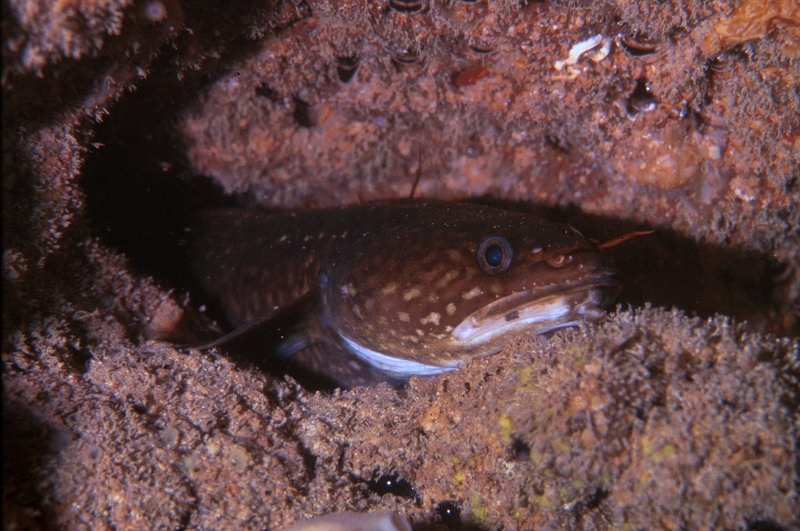

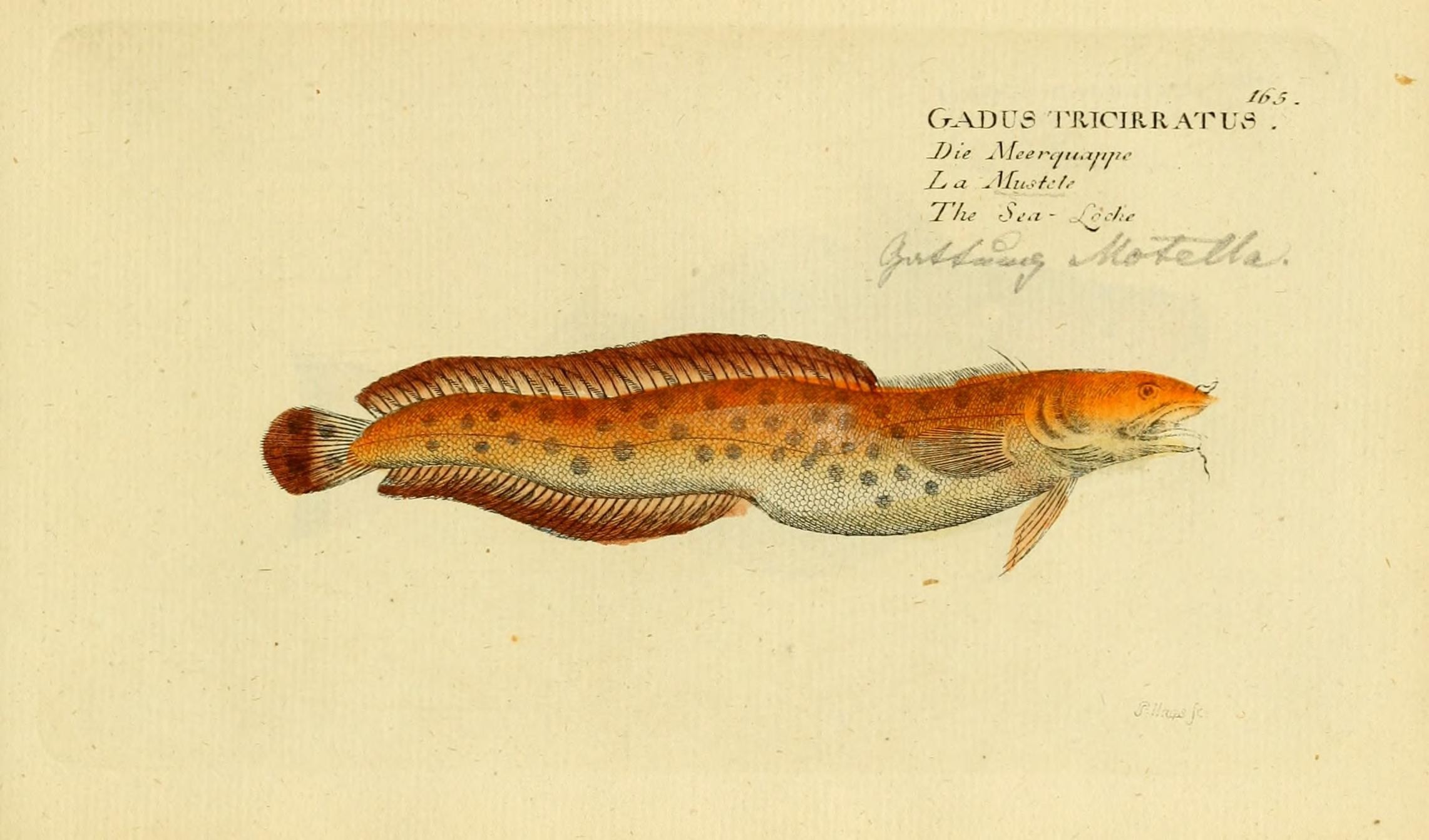

Conservation status
- Least Concern (IUCN 3.1) Europe

- Least Concern (IUCN 3.1) Mediterranean

Scientific classification
- Kingdom: Animalia
- Phylum: Chordata
- Class: Actinopterygii
- Order: Gadiformes
- Family: Gaidropsaridae
- Genus: Gaidropsarus
- Species: G. mediterraneus

Binomial name
- Gaidropsarus mediterraneus (Linnaeus, 1758)

Synonyms
- List: Gadus mediterraneus Linnaeus, 1758; Enchelyopus mediterraneus (Linnaeus, 1758); Motella mediterranea (Linnaeus, 1758); Onos mediterraneus (Linnaeus, 1758); Gadus tricirratus Brünnich, 1768; Gaidropsarus mustellaris Rafinesque, 1810; Gadus fuscus Risso, 1810; Motella fusca (Risso, 1810); Onos fusca (Risso, 1810); Gadus jubatus Pallas, 1814; Gadus argenteolus Montagu, 1818; Merlangus communis Costa, 1844; Motella communis Costa, 1844; Onos sellai Cipria, 1938

= Shore rockling =

Species of fish

The shore rockling (Gaidropsarus mediterraneus) is a mottled brown, small, elongated fish. This eel-like fish has three barbels on its head, with the second dorsal fin and the anal fin running the length of most of its body. These fins may be viewed moving in a continuous wave motion.

The shore rockling is often confused with the five-bearded rockling (Ciliata mustela) and the larger three-bearded rockling (Gaidropsarus vulgaris), due to their similar colourings, shape, and habitat. As the name suggests, the main visual differences are the five-bearded rockling having five barbels around its mouth, whereas the three-bearded rockling has a significant redness to its brown colouring when compared to the shore rockling. Shore rocklings can also be eaten, as the flesh is very tender.

Shore rocklings live in rocks, feeding on both worms and crustaceans. They are distributed in the eastern Atlantic from the mid-Norwegian coast south to the Straits of Gibraltar and into the Mediterranean Sea, where it is found along the coasts of north-west Africa and southern Europe into the Black Sea.
