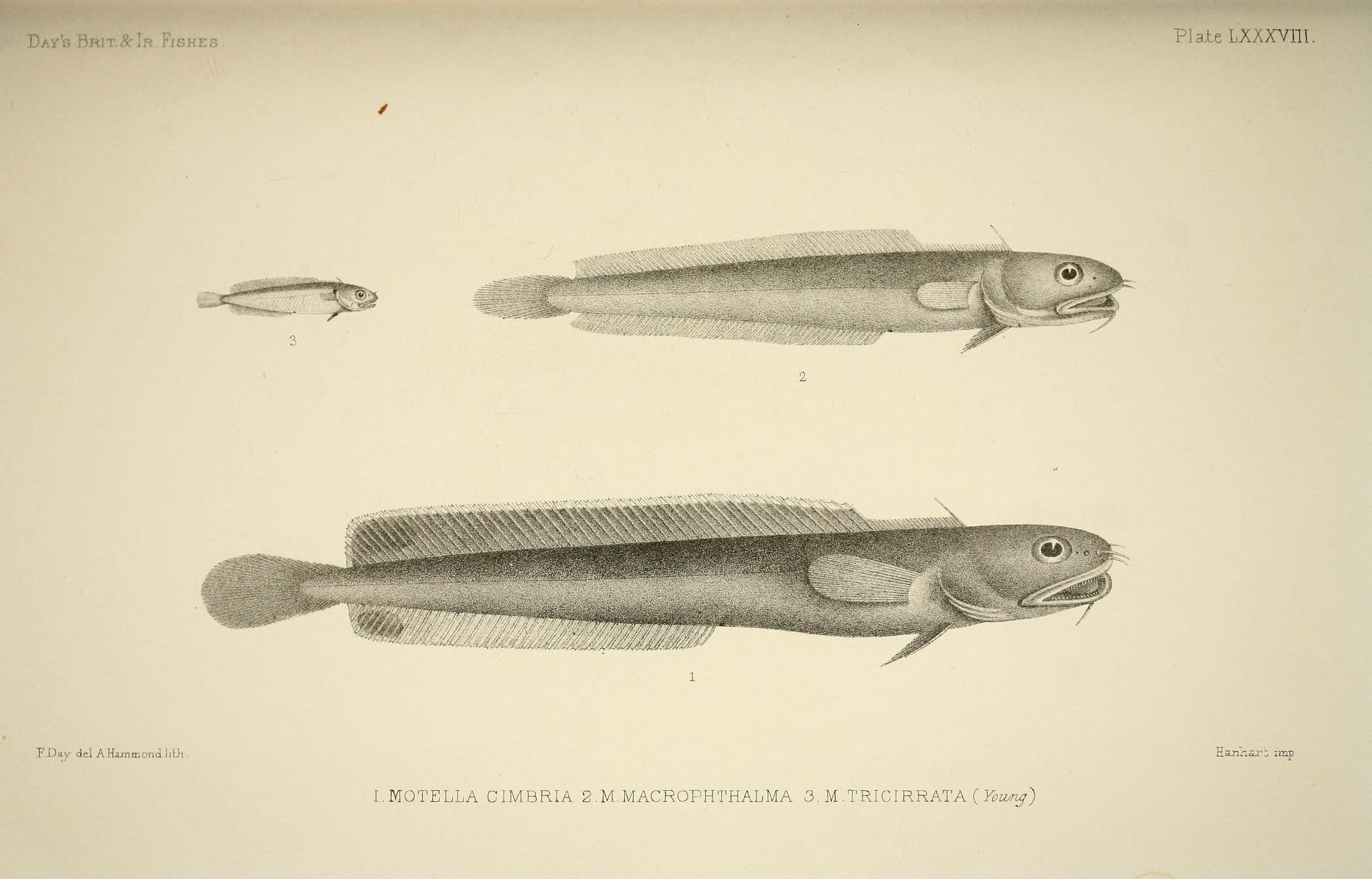
- Illustration from The fishes of Great Britain and Ireland (1880–1884), bigeye rockling in the top right.

Conservation status
- Least Concern (IUCN 3.1)

Scientific classification
- Kingdom: Animalia
- Phylum: Chordata
- Class: Actinopterygii
- Order: Gadiformes
- Family: Gaidropsaridae
- Genus: Gaidropsarus
- Species: G. macrophthalmus

Binomial name
- Gaidropsarus macrophthalmus (Günther, 1867)

Synonyms
- Antonogadus macrophthalmus Günther, 1867; Gaidropsarus macropthalmus Günther, 1867; Motella macrophthalma Günther, 1867; Motella macrophthalmus Günther, 1867; Onus carpenteri Günther, 1867; Onus macrophthalmus Günther, 1867

= Bigeye rockling =

Species of fish

The bigeye rockling (Gaidropsarus macrophthalmus) is a species of fish in the family Lotidae.

== Description ==
The bigeye rockling's maximum length is 25 cm (9.8 in). It is silvery-pink in colour, its back mottled with medium brown, and the eyes more than half the length of its snout. The first dorsal spine is followed by fleshy filaments. There is one barbel on the lower jaw and two on the snout. The upper jaw has long pointed teeth.

== Habitat ==
Bigeye rockling live in the northeastern Atlantic Ocean. It is demersal, living at depths of 150–530 m (490–1,740 ft).

== Behaviour ==
Bigeye rockling feed on crustaceans. It breeds in early spring.
