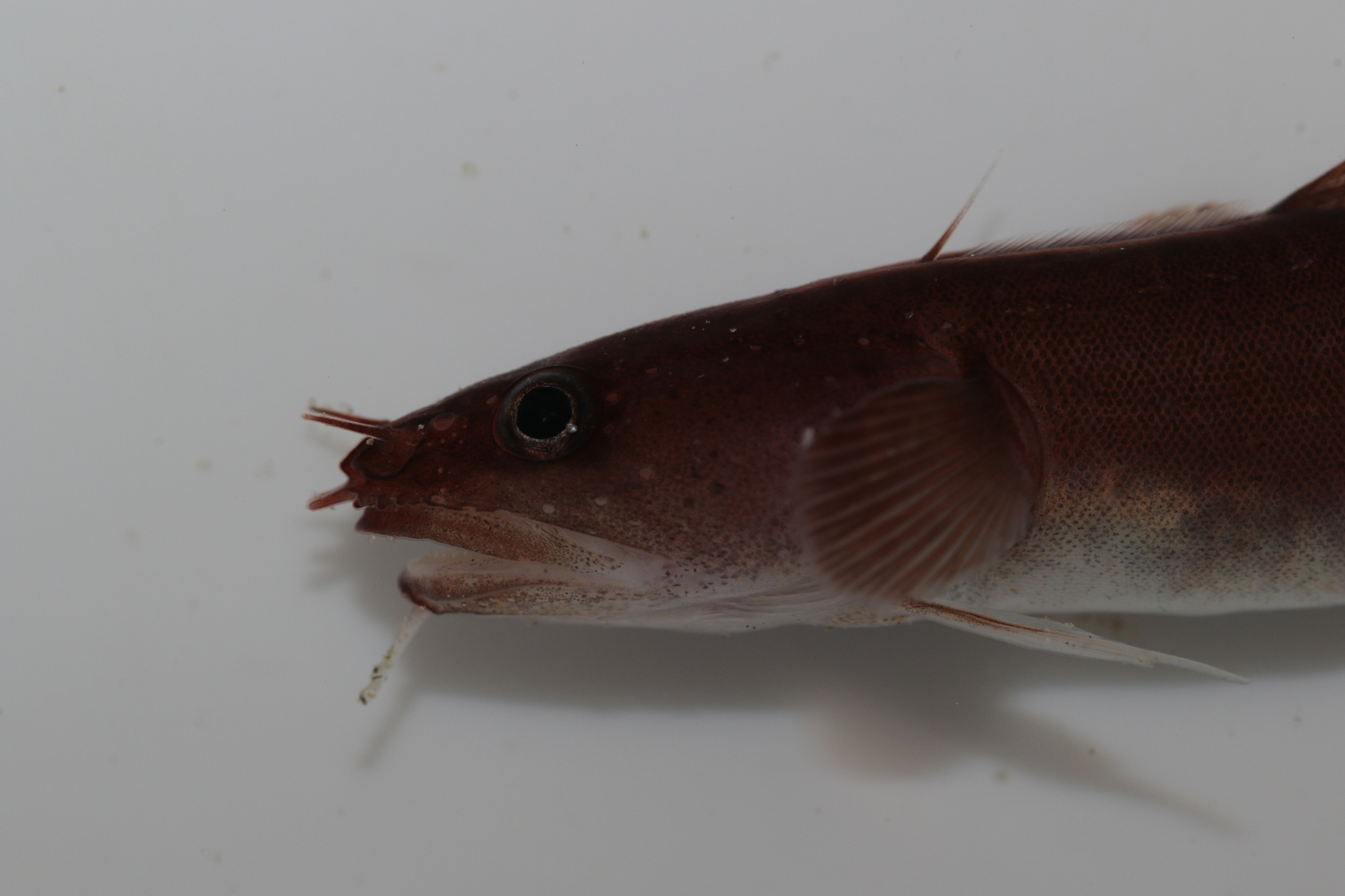

Conservation status
- Least Concern (IUCN 3.1)

Scientific classification
- Kingdom: Animalia
- Phylum: Chordata
- Class: Actinopterygii
- Order: Gadiformes
- Family: Gaidropsaridae
- Genus: Ciliata
- Species: C. septentrionalis

Binomial name
- Ciliata septentrionalis (Collett, 1875)

Synonyms
- Gaidropsarus septentrionalis (Collett, 1875); Motella septentrionalis Collett, 1875; Onos septentrionalis (Collett, 1875)

= Ciliata septentrionalis =

Species of fish

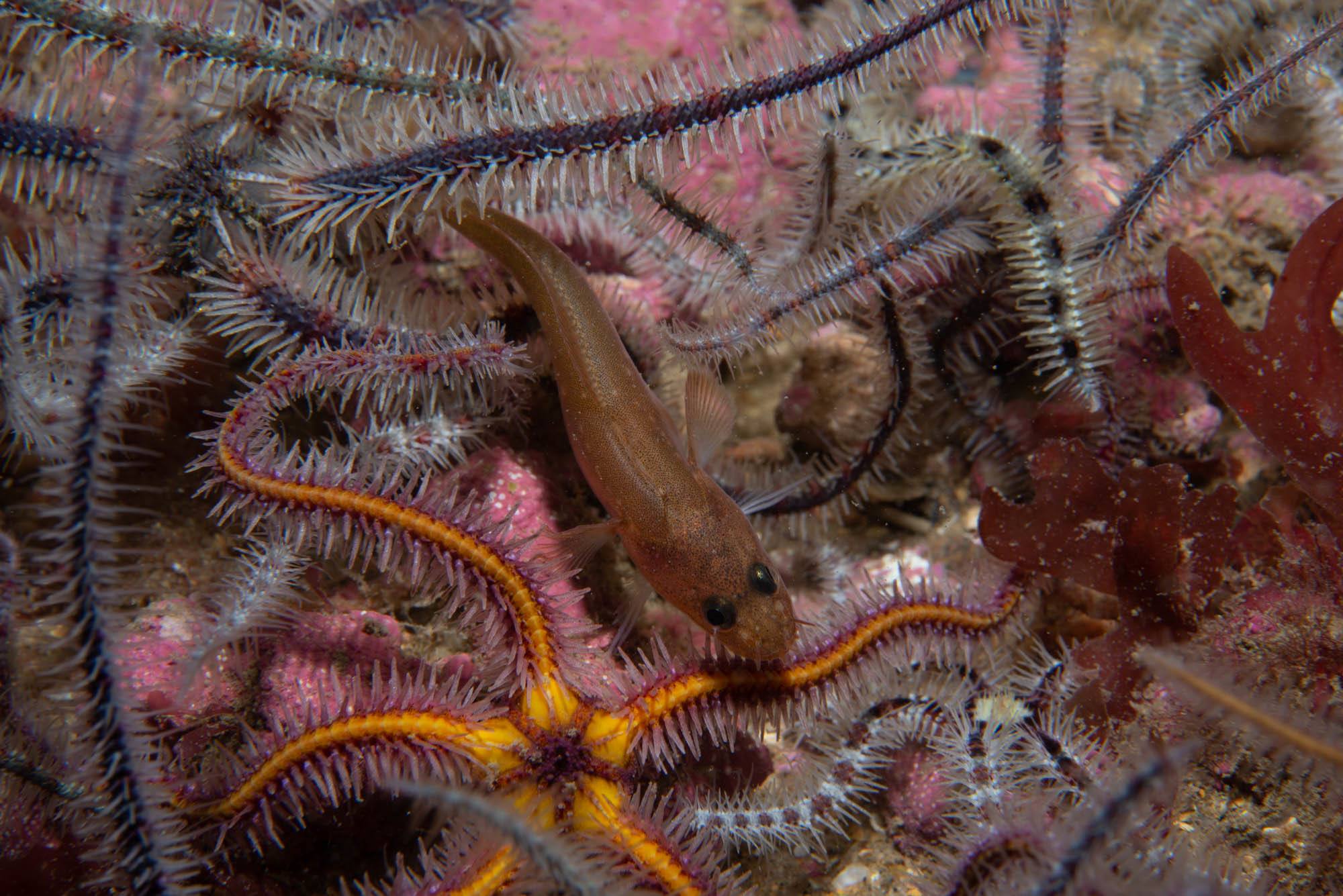

Ciliata septentrionalis is a species of fish belonging to the family Lotidae.

It is native to the sublittoral zone around Northwestern European coastlines, mostly around the British Isles, Norway, Faroe Islands and Iceland.
