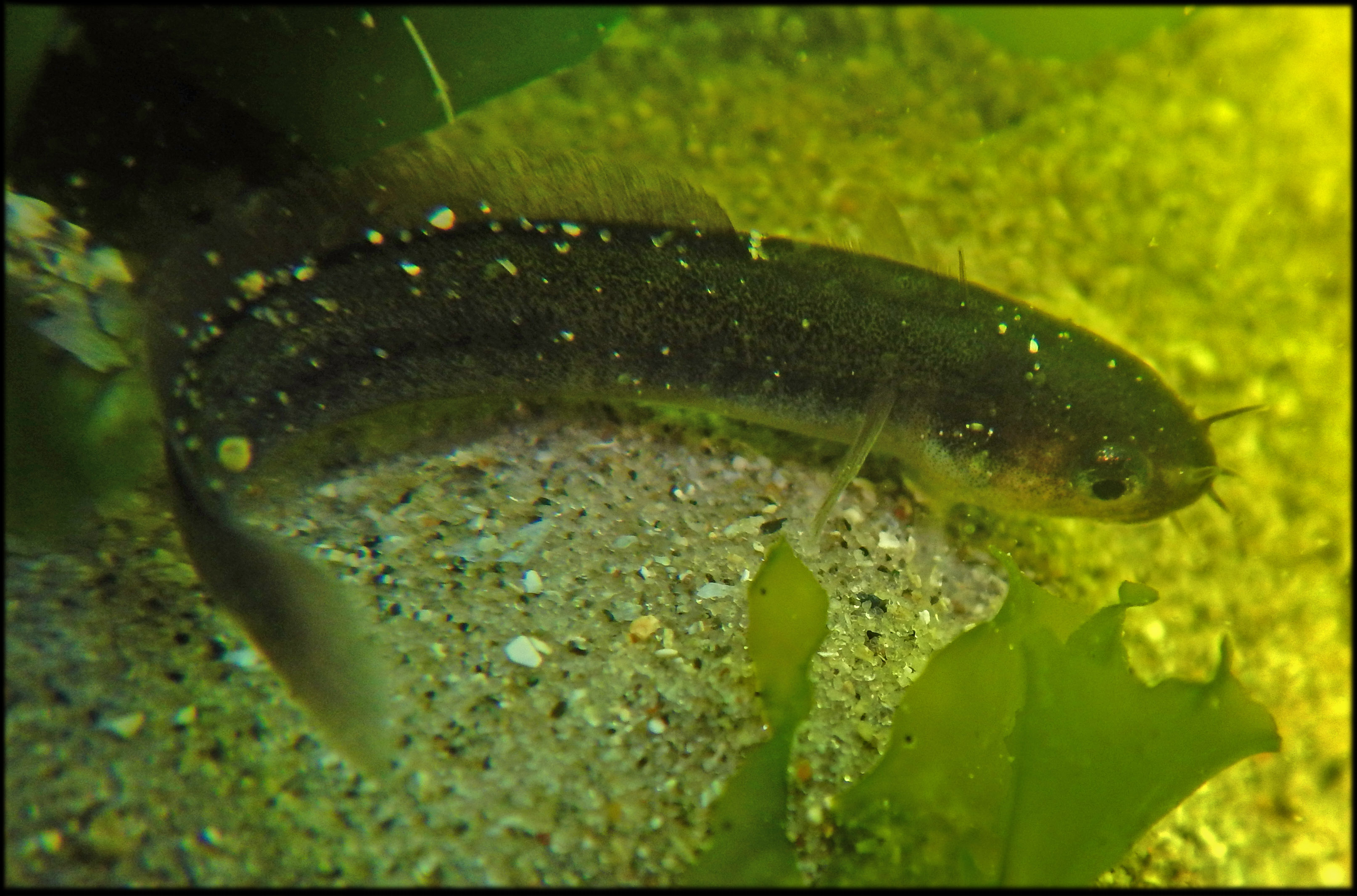

Conservation status
- Least Concern (IUCN 3.1)

Scientific classification
- Kingdom: Animalia
- Phylum: Chordata
- Class: Actinopterygii
- Division: Teleostei
- Order: Gadiformes
- Family: Gaidropsaridae
- Genus: Ciliata
- Species: C. mustela

Binomial name
- Ciliata mustela (Linnaeus, 1758)

Synonyms
- Gadus mustela Linnaeus, 1758; Enchelyopus mustela (Linnaeus, 1758); Gaidropsarus mustela (Linnaeus, 1758); Motella mustela (Linnaeus, 1758); Onos mustela (Linnaeus, 1758); Ciliata glauca Couch, 1832; Couchia glauca (Couch, 1832); Couchia minor Thompson, 1839; Motella argenteola Düben & Koren, 1846; Molvella borealis Kaup, 1858

= Fivebeard rockling =

Species of fish

The fivebeard rockling (Ciliata mustela) is a coastal ray-finned fish of the family Lotidae. the lings and rocklings. It is found in the eastern Atlantic Ocean. It is not a fish of any commercial importance.

== Description ==
The fivebeard rockling is a long, slender fish which may attain a length of 25 centimetres (9.8 in). It has a smooth, scaleless body with unusual and long dorsal, which is made up of a first ray followed by a line of vibrating rays in a furrow in the back. The front part of the dorsal fin does not have any membrane connecting the rays although the rear dorsal fin is which runs the length of the body, as does the anal fin, is made up of rays connected by membrane. It has five barbels around its mouth, two above either nostril and a single barbel on the lower jaw. It has a rather small mouth with the corners of the mouth just going beyond the eye. The main colour is dark brown. This fades to pale gray-brown on the underside.

== Distribution ==
The fivebeard rockling is found in the eastern Atlantic from Finnmark to Lisbon, including the Skagerrak, the Kattegat, Iceland and around Great Britain and Ireland.

== Habitat and biology ==
The fivebeard rockling is found in the intertidal zone, often under rocks. They are usually found in rocky areas but it can be found in breakwater pools on sandy shores so long as these have a growth of algae. These fish can display homing behaviour and are normally found no deeper than the lower limit for the growth of green algae, around 20 metres (66 ft). They are predatory fish and the major part of their diet is crustaceans but they will eat polychaetes, gastropods and small fish, they have also been recorded consuming algae. The five-bearded rockling has a temperature range of 8 to 24 °C (46 to 75 °F) Both sexes reach maturity at around one year old. A smaller female may lay as few as 9,000 eggs when spawning, while the largest females may lay as many as 30,000. Spawning takes place in the deeper waters of the Atlantic to the west of Ireland during February to May. The eggs and larvae are pelagic.

== Threats ==
The fivebeard rockling is regarded as being of least concern by the IUCN and is not a commercially important species, in the warmer waters in which it occurs it may be threatened by climate change.
