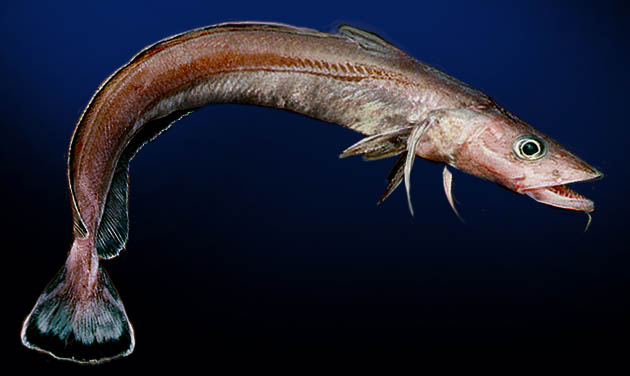

Conservation status
- Least Concern (IUCN 3.1)

Scientific classification
- Kingdom: Animalia
- Phylum: Chordata
- Class: Actinopterygii
- Order: Gadiformes
- Family: Lotidae
- Genus: Molva
- Species: M. macrophthalma

Binomial name
- Molva macrophthalma (Rafinesque, 1810)

Synonyms
- Phycis macrophthalmus Rafinesque, 1810; Gadus elongatus Otto, 1821; Lota elongata Otto, 1821; Lotta elongata Otto, 1821; Molva dipterygia elongata Otto, 1821; Molva dypterygia macrophthalma Rafinesque, 1810; Molva elongata Otto, 1821

= Spanish ling =

Species of fish

The Spanish ling (Molva macrophthalma), also called the Mediterranean ling and even blue ling (though the latter is also used for Molva dypterygia), is a species of fish in the family Lotidae.

== Description ==
It maximum length is 108 cm (3.54 ft).

== Habitat ==
Spanish ling lives in the northeastern Atlantic Ocean and western Mediterranean; it is common in the Azores. It lives at moderate shallow waters, being recorded at depths of 388–754 m (1,273–2,474 ft) in the Ionian Sea, and has also been found in the Aegean Sea.

== Behaviour ==
It feeds on bony fish, squid and lobsters. Known parasites include Lernaeocera copepods.
