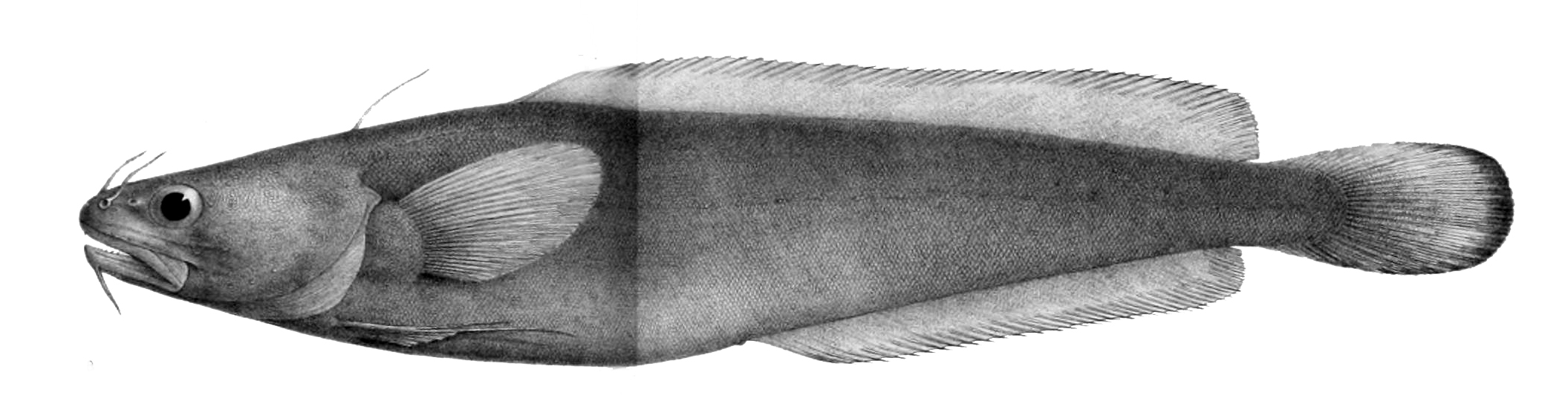

Scientific classification
- Domain: Eukaryota
- Kingdom: Animalia
- Phylum: Chordata
- Class: Actinopterygii
- Order: Gadiformes
- Family: Lotidae
- Genus: Gaidropsarus
- Species: G. argentatus

Binomial name
- Gaidropsarus argentatus (Reinhardt, 1837)

Synonyms
- Gaidropsarus reinhardti Collett, 1879; Motella argentata Reinhardt, 1837; Motella reinhardi Collett, 1879; Motella reinhardti Collett, 1879; Onogadus argentatus Reinhardt, 1838; Onos argentatus Reinhardt, 1837; Onos reinhardi Collett, 1879; Onus reinhardti Collett, 1879

= Arctic rockling =

Species of fish

The Arctic rockling (Gaidropsarus argentatus), also called the silver rockling or Arctic threebeard, is a species of fish in the family Lotidae.

== Description ==
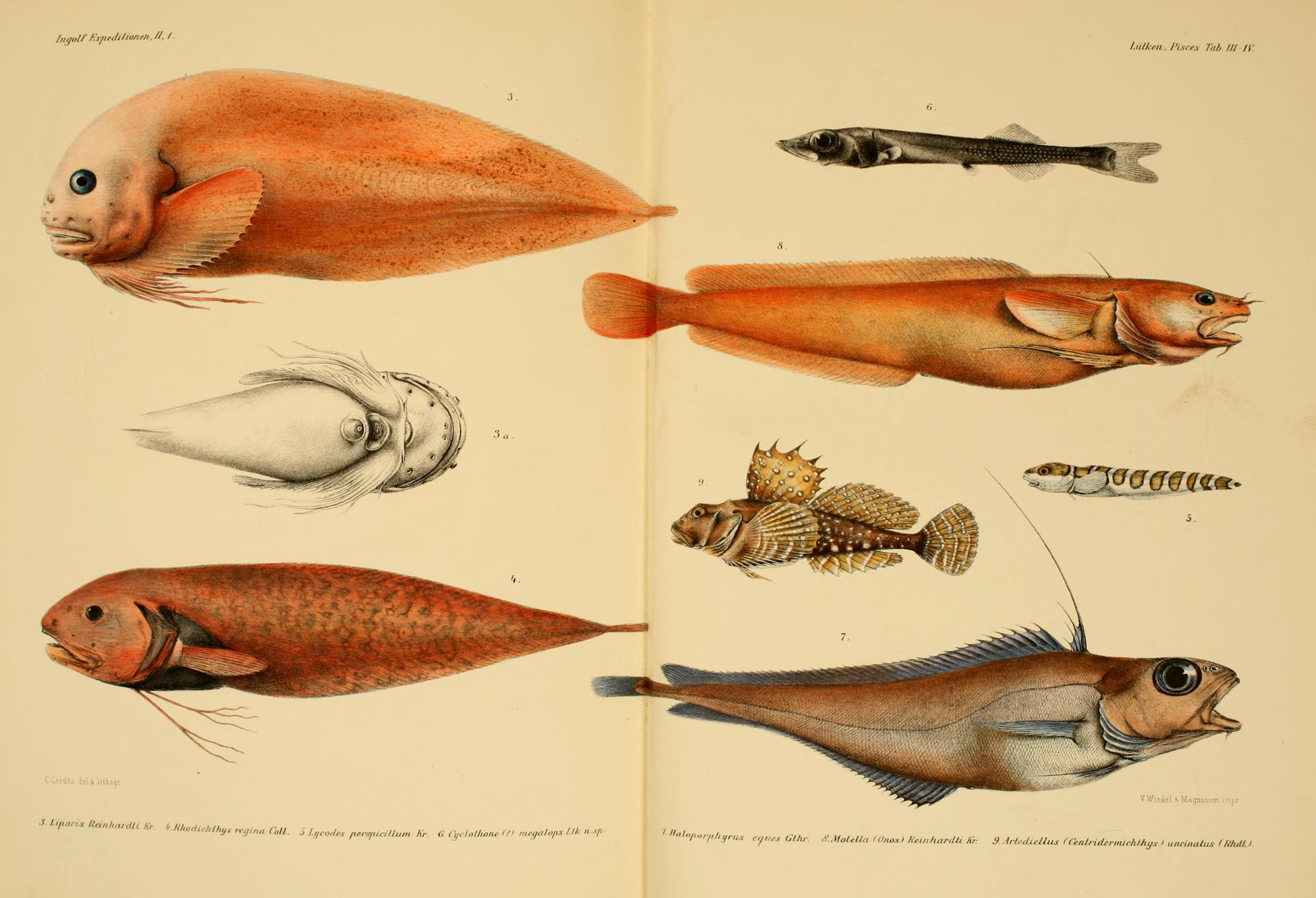
Illustration of fish found on the Danish Ingolf expedition; Arctic rockling is numbered 8, the orange fish in the upper right.

The Arctic rockling's maximum length is 35 cm (14 in). It has two dorsal fins and one anal fin, with the first ray in the first dorsal fin being elongated to form a whisker-like projection. It has 51–53 vertebrae (including urostyle). The upper body is brown-red, its belly pink, there is a blue hue around its head, and the barbels and fin tips are red. The young are silvery in colour, hence the name.

== Habitat ==
Arctic rockling live in the northeastern Atlantic Ocean, in very cold water, 0 °C (32 °F) or lower. It is epibenthic, living over gravel, mud or sand at depths of 400–500 m (1,300–1,600 ft), sometimes as shallow as 150 m (490 ft).

== Behaviour ==
Arctic rockling feed on decapod, amphipod, and euphausiid crustaceans, and fish.
