= Torsk =

Torsk may refer to:

- The Danish, Norwegian and Swedish word for cod and Atlantic cod
- A common name for cusk (fish),
- USS Torsk (SS-423), an American submarine; built 1944, since 1972 a floating museum
