= C. ciliata =

C. ciliata may refer to:

- Cassia ciliata, a synonym for Senna occidentalis, a pantropical plant species
- Corythucha ciliata, the sycamore lace bug, an insect species found in Europe

== See also ==
- Ciliata (disambiguation)
