= Ciliata =

Ciliata may refer to:

- The ciliates, a group of ciliated protists
- Ciliata (fish), a genus of fishes in the family Lotidae
