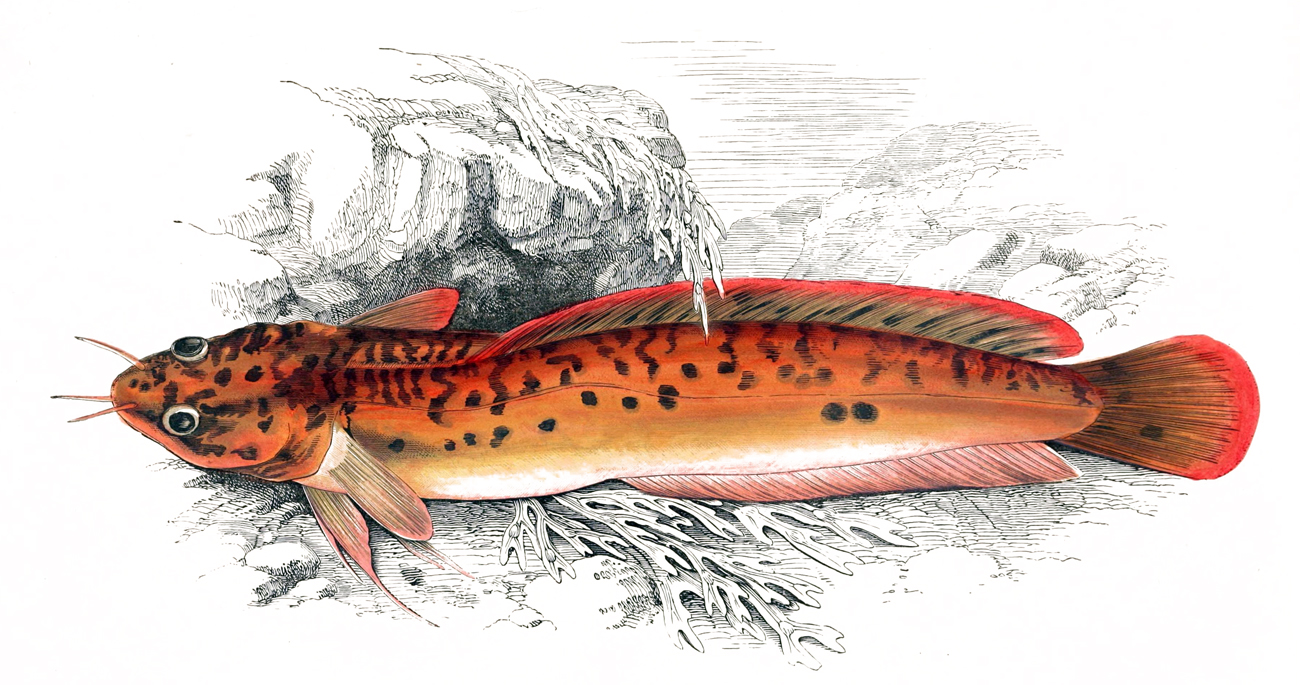

Conservation status
- Least Concern (IUCN 3.1)

Scientific classification
- Kingdom: Animalia
- Phylum: Chordata
- Class: Actinopterygii
- Order: Gadiformes
- Family: Gaidropsaridae
- Genus: Gaidropsarus
- Species: G. vulgaris

Binomial name
- Gaidropsarus vulgaris (Cloquet, 1824)

Synonyms
- Mustela vulgaris Cloquet, 1824; Motella vulgaris (Cloquet, 1824); Onos vulgaris (Cloquet, 1824); Onos maculata Risso, 1827

= Three-bearded rockling =

Species of fish

The three-bearded rockling (Gaidropsarus vulgaris) is found in European waters from the central Norwegian coast and the Faroe Islands, through the North Sea, and around the British Isles to the region around the western Mediterranean. They can grow to a maximum length of 60 cm (2 ft). Their coloration varies from dusky to pale, with large chocolate-brown spots on the head and body, and fin coloration varies with location. They also may have xanthochromism, which is colour condition characterized by overt of yellow-orange-red pigmentation, because of high levels of xanthophores in the skin. Three barbels, one on the bottom jaw and two on the snout, provide the fish with its common name.
