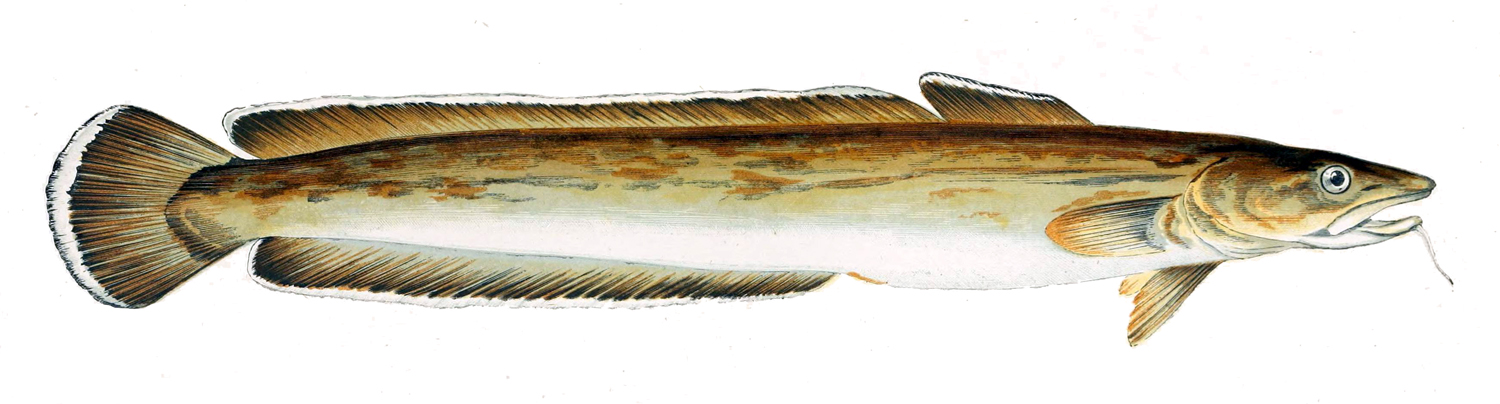
- Common ling (M. molva)

Scientific classification
- Kingdom: Animalia
- Phylum: Chordata
- Class: Actinopterygii
- Division: Teleostei
- Order: Gadiformes
- Family: Lotidae
- Genus: Molva; Lesueur, 1819

Type species
- Gadus molva Linnaeus, 1758

= Molva =

Genus of fishes

Molva is a genus of lotid fishes, the lings, with these currently recognized species:

- Molva dypterygia (Pennant, 1784) (blue ling)
- Molva macrophthalma (Rafinesque, 1810) (Spanish ling)
- Molva molva (Linnaeus, 1758) (common ling)

== Etymology ==
The generic name derives ultimately from Latin morua ("codfish"), which became morlue in Old French and then molva in Provencal and molve in Modern French. Another theory derives it from Breton mor ("sea") and Old French luz ("pike").
