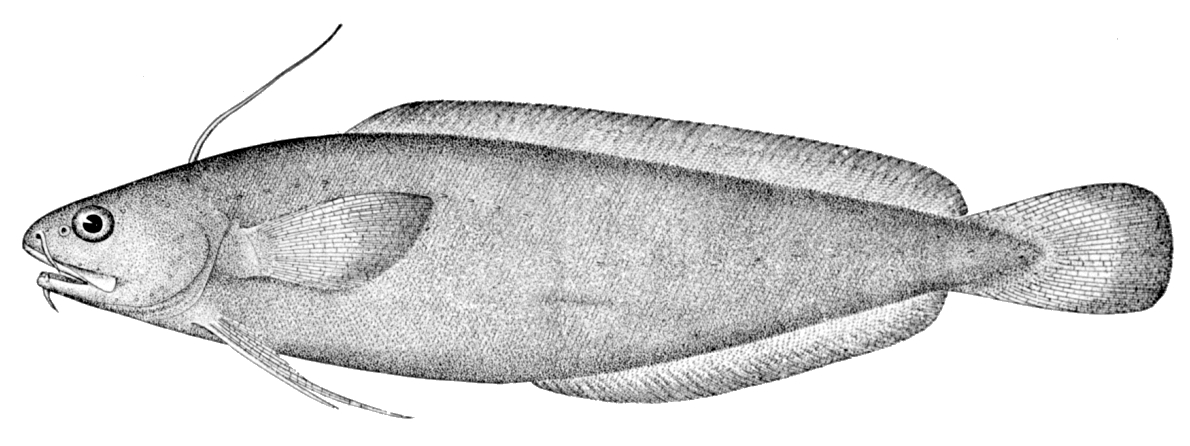
- Threadfin rockling (G. ensis)
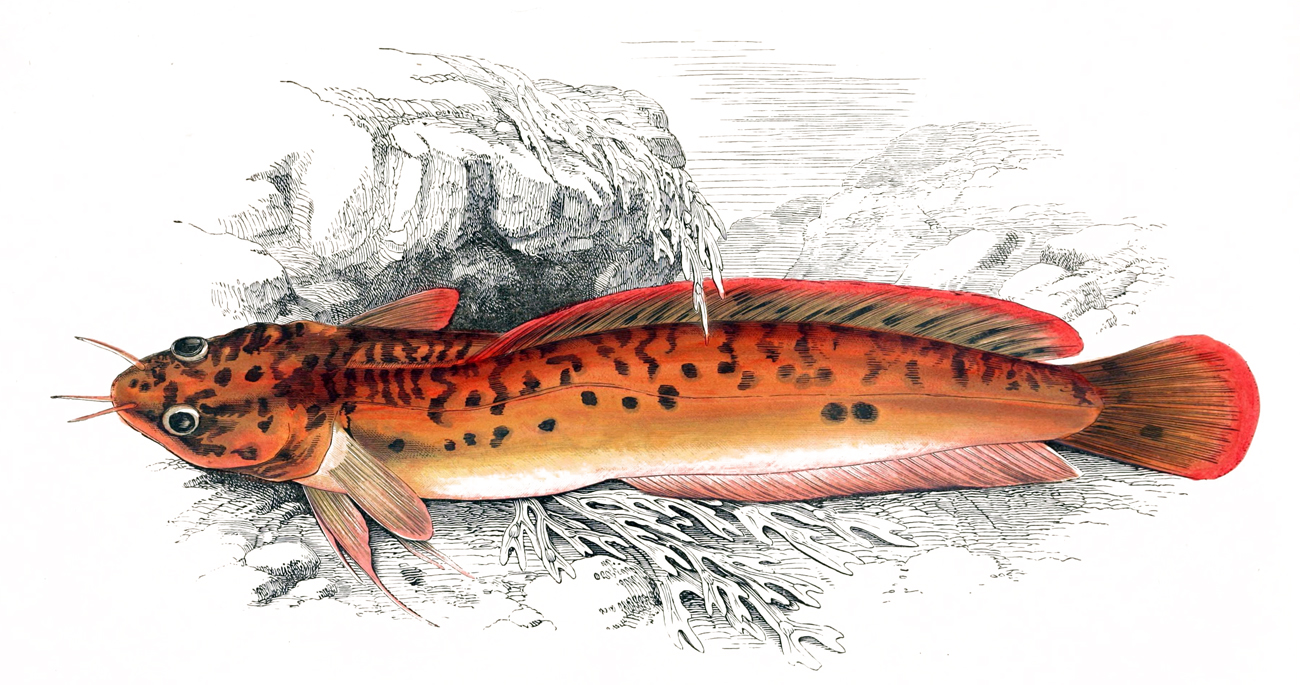
- Three-bearded rockling (G. vulgaris)

Scientific classification
- Kingdom: Animalia
- Phylum: Chordata
- Class: Actinopterygii
- Division: Teleostei
- Order: Gadiformes
- Family: Gaidropsaridae
- Genus: Gaidropsarus; Rafinesque, 1810

Type species
- Gaidropsarus mustellaris Rafinesque, 1810

Synonyms
- Antonogadus Wheeler, 1969; Motella Cuvier, 1829; Mustel Oken, 1817; Onogadus de Buen, 1934; Onos Risso, 1827; Onus Agassiz, 1846

= Gaidropsarus =

Gaidropsarus Temporal range: Middle Miocene to recent

Genus of fishes

Gaidropsarus is a genus of gaidropsarid fishes, with these currently recognized species:

- Gaidropsarus argentatus (J. C. H. Reinhardt, 1837) (Arctic rockling)
- Gaidropsarus biscayensis (Collett, 1890) (Mediterranean bigeye rockling)
- Gaidropsarus capensis (Kaup, 1858) (Cape rockling)
- Gaidropsarus ensis (J. C. H. Reinhardt, 1837) (threadfin rockling)
- Gaidropsarus granti (Regan, 1903) (Azores rockling)
- Gaidropsarus guttatus (Collett, 1890)
- Gaidropsarus insularum Sivertsen, 1945 (comb rockling)
- Gaidropsarus macrophthalmus (Günther, 1867) (bigeye rockling)
- Gaidropsarus mauritanicus (Knorrn, 2024)
- Gaidropsarus mediterraneus (Linnaeus, 1758) (shore rockling)
- Gaidropsarus novaezealandiae (Hector, 1874) (New Zealand ling)
- Gaidropsarus pacificus (Temminck & Schlegel, 1846)
- Gaidropsarus pakhorukovi Shcherbachev, 1995
- Gaidropsarus parini Svetovidov (ru), 1986
- Gaidropsarus vulgaris (Cloquet, 1824) (three-bearded rockling)

The following fossil species are also known:

- †Gaidropsarus murdjadjensis (Arambourg, 1928) - latest Miocene (Messinian) of Algeria.
- †Gaidropsarus pilleri Carnevale, 2013 - Middle Miocene (Serravallian) of Austria

The generic name derives from the Ancient Greek roots γῆ (gē, earth); υδρο- (hydro-, "water"); and ψαρός (psaros, "speckled").
