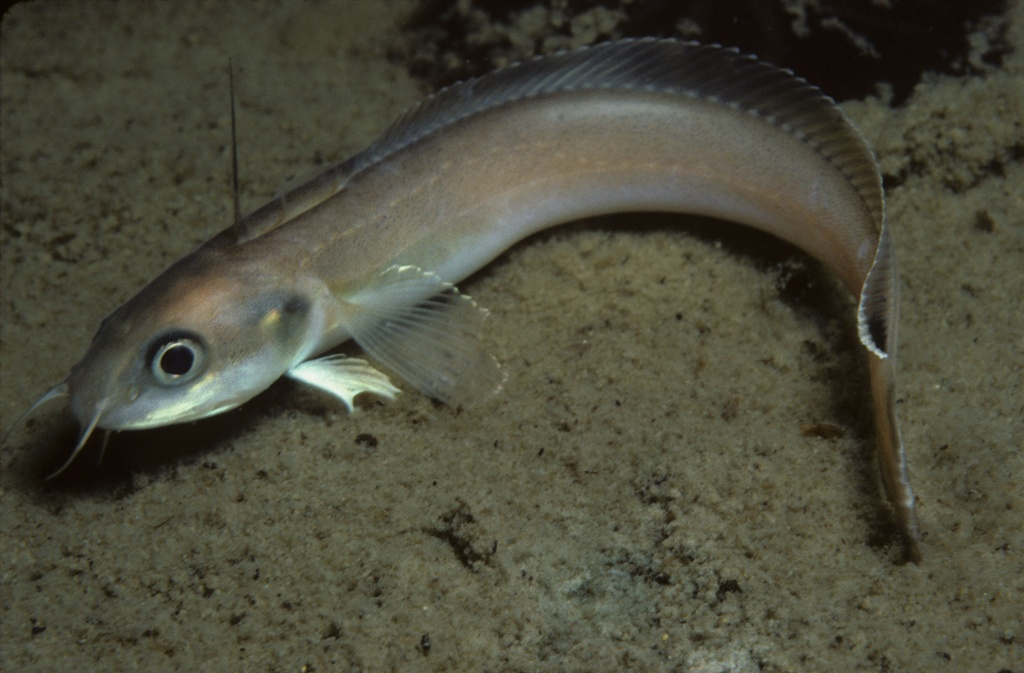

Conservation status
- Least Concern (IUCN 3.1)

Scientific classification
- Kingdom: Animalia
- Phylum: Chordata
- Class: Actinopterygii
- Order: Gadiformes
- Family: Gaidropsaridae
- Genus: Enchelyopus; Bloch & Schneider, 1801
- Species: E. cimbrius

Binomial name
- Enchelyopus cimbrius (Linnaeus, 1766)

Synonyms
- Gadus cimbrius Linnaeus, 1766; Rhinonemus cimbrius (Linnaeus, 1766)

= Fourbeard rockling =

Fourbeard rockling Temporal range: Middle Miocene–present

Species of fish

The fourbeard rockling or four-bearded rockling (Enchelyopus cimbrius) is a species of gaidropsarid fish found in the northern Atlantic Ocean. This species grows to 41 cm (16 in) in total length. It is of minor importance in commercial fisheries.

== Evolution ==
The fourbeard rockling is the only extant member of the genus Enchelyopus. A fossil relative, †Enchelyopus susedanus (Kner, 1863) (=Brosmius susedanus Kner, 1863) is known from the Middle Miocene of Croatia and Crimea, and is known from both fossil skeletons and isolated otoliths. A second species, †Enchelyopus gaemersi Schwarzhans, 2010 is known from the Middle Miocene of Germany, exclusively from isolated otoliths.

== Description ==
The fourbeard rockling is a long, slender fish named for its four barbels, one of which is on the chin and the others on the snout. The vent is halfway along the body and behind that, the body is laterally compressed. The anterior dorsal fin has one prominent long ray and is otherwise short and low. The posterior dorsal fin is very long and of even height. The anal fin is also long and the pelvic fins are in front of the pectorals. The caudal peduncle is very short and the caudal fin is rounded. The skin is slimy and the scales are not easy to see. The dorsal surface is generally brownish with sometimes some irregular darker blotches at the posterior end. The flanks and belly are silvery grey. The fins are a bluish colour with darker trailing edges to the dorsal, anal and caudal fins. The size of this fish is usually between 20 and 30 cm (8 and 12 in) with a maximum length of 41 cm (16 in).

== Distribution and habitat ==
The fourbeard rockling is found in the northwestern Atlantic Ocean from northern Gulf of Mexico to Newfoundland and western Greenland, and in the northeastern Atlantic Ocean from the Bay of Biscay to Iceland and the Barents Sea, the western Baltic Sea and occasionally in the Gulf of Finland. It has become a near-threatened species in the Baltic.

It migrates offshore in spring and inshore in autumn. Its depth range is about 20 to 500 m (66 to 1,640 ft).

== Biology ==
The fourbeard rockling is a bottom-dwelling fish which feeds on crustaceans, polychaete worms, molluscs and other invertebrates. It usually breeds between February and August, releasing the spawn in deep water after which the eggs float towards the surface.
