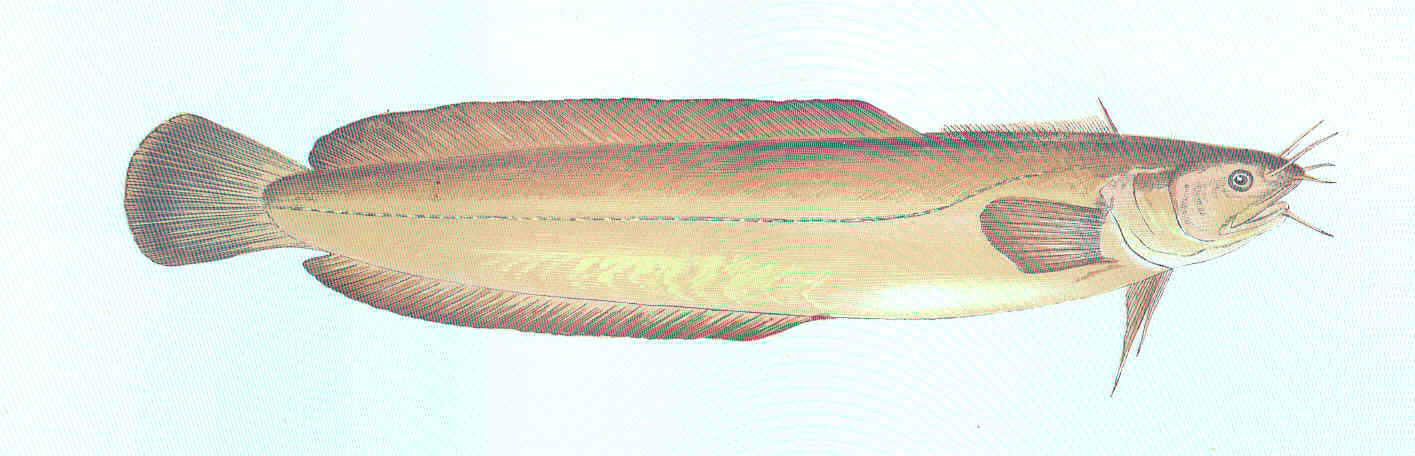
- Five-Bearded Rockling Gadus mustela Motella mustela Motella quinquecirrata

Scientific classification
- Kingdom: Animalia
- Phylum: Chordata
- Class: Actinopterygii
- Order: Gadiformes
- Family: Gaidropsaridae
- Genus: Ciliata; Couch, 1832

Type species
- Ciliata glauca Couch 1832

Synonyms
- Couchia Thompson, 1839; Molvella Kaup, 1858

= Ciliata (fish) =

Genus of fishes

Ciliata is a genus of fishes in the family Gaidropsaridae, with these currently recognized species:

- Ciliata mustela (Linnaeus, 1758) (fivebeard rockling)
- Ciliata septentrionalis (Collett, 1875) (northern rockling)
- Ciliata tchangi S. Z. Li, 1994
