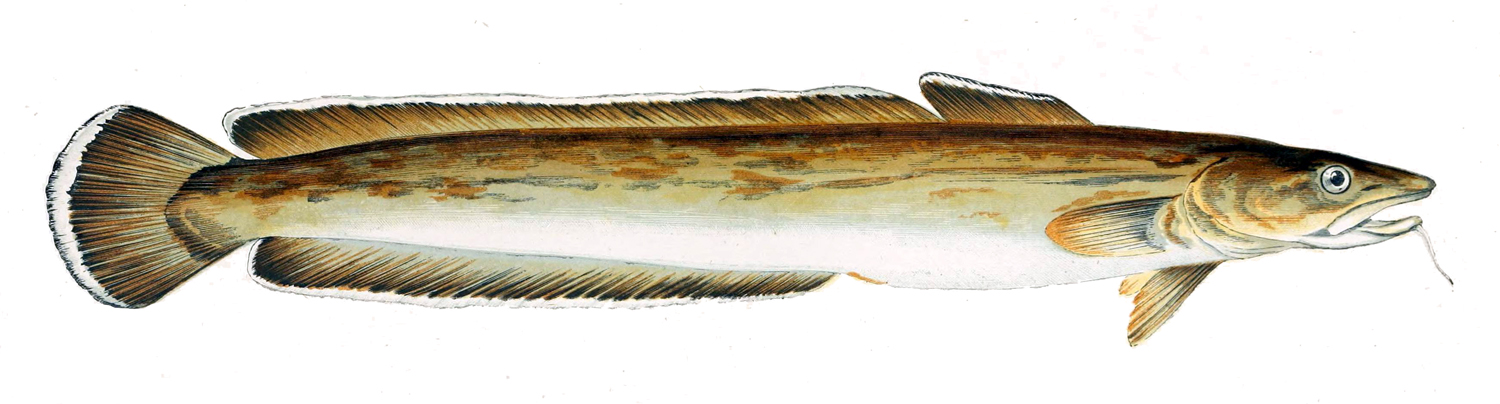

Conservation status
- Least Concern (IUCN 3.1)

Scientific classification
- Kingdom: Animalia
- Phylum: Chordata
- Class: Actinopterygii
- Order: Gadiformes
- Family: Lotidae
- Genus: Molva
- Species: M. molva

Binomial name
- Molva molva (Linnaeus, 1758)
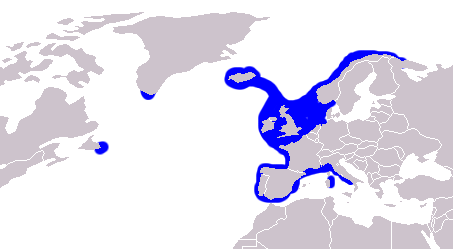
- Molva molva range map.

Synonyms
- Gadus molva Linnaeus, 1758; Molva vulgaris Fleming, 1828; Gadus raptor Nilsson, 1832; Molva linnei Malm, 1877; Lota mola Moreau, 1881

= Common ling =

Species of fish

The common ling (Molva molva), also known as the white ling or simply the ling, is a large member of the family Lotidae, a group of cod-like fish. It resembles the related rocklings, but it is much larger and has a single barbel. This species is unrelated to the pink ling, Genypterus blacodes, from the Southern Hemisphere. The common ling is found in the northern Atlantic, mainly off Europe, and into the Mediterranean Basin. It is an important quarry species for fisheries, especially in the northeastern Atlantic, although some doubts exist as to the sustainability of the fisheries. As an edible species, it is eaten fresh, frozen, or dried, but also preserved in lye, while the roe is a delicacy in Spain.

== Distribution ==
The common ling is a North Atlantic species found in the further eastern coast of Canada, southern Greenland, Iceland, and the north-eastern Atlantic from the Barents Sea, around the coasts of the UK, becoming scarcer towards the south, France, Portugal, and north-western Europe, south to the Straits of Gibraltar and into the north-western coasts of the Mediterranean Sea.

It is rare in the Mediterranean and in the North Sea, where it occurs as far east as the Skagerrak and Kattegat.

== Description ==
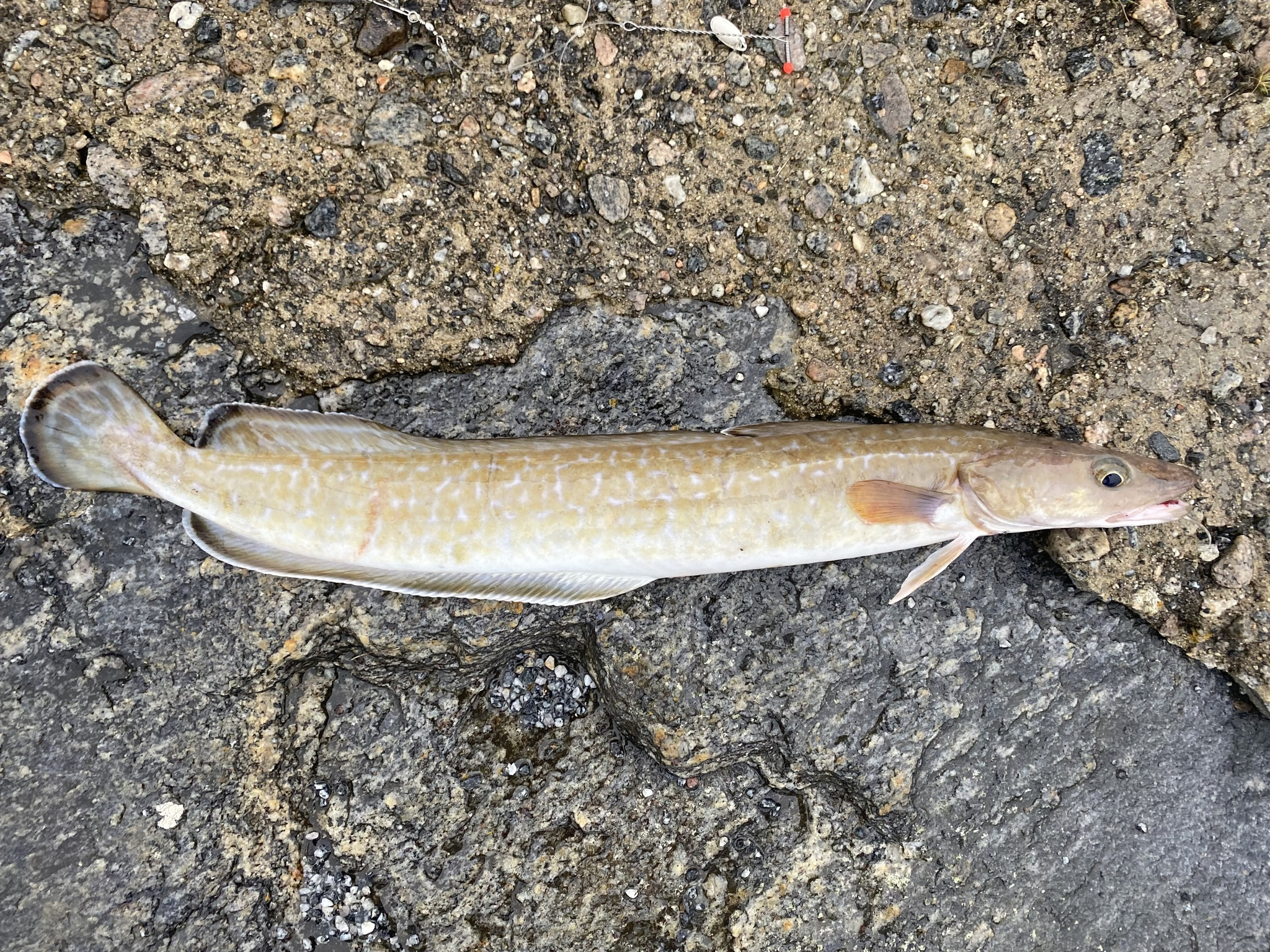
In Norway

The common ling is the longest and one of the largest of the cod-like fish, the Gadiformes, which can reach lengths of 200 cm and weights of 30 kg. It is long and slender with a small head and small eyes and a large mouth, which has large teeth, with the upper jaw projecting beyond the lower jaw, which bears an obvious sensory barbel. Of the two dorsal fins, the anterior dorsal fin is short, having 14–15 fin rays, with a rounded profile, while the posterior dorsal fin is much longer with 61–68 fin rays and is uniform in height and is similar in length to the anal fin. The anal fin is also elongated and has 58–64 fin rays. The vertebral count of this species is between 63 and 65 vertebrae. The caudal peduncle and the pelvic fins are short, with the pelvic fin not reaching past the pectoral fins. The dorsum is a marbled greenish-brown, sometimes reddish-brown on the most upper part, lightening on the flanks and underside. A distinct white edge is seen on the anal and dorsal fins and they have a dark spot at their posterior end. However, the spot on the anterior dorsal fin is more conspicuous than that on the posterior dorsal fin. The juvenile fish tend to be lighter in colour than adults and are often marked with pale purplish iridescent lines.

A common ling measuring 6 ft (180 cm) in length was caught off Shetland on 24 February 2013. This is the largest ling ever caught on rod and line in British waters.

== Habitat and biology ==
Video of a common ling

The common ling is a demersal species that can be found over rocky substrates from 15 to 600 m or more in depth; it is most common between 100 and 400 m. The juveniles, less than 2 years old, are coastal, occurring in depths of 15–20 m, and pelagic; at 3 years, they migrate to deeper areas. Sexual maturity is attained at 5 years for males, at a length of around 80 cm and 5 or 6 years for females when they are between 90 and 100 cm in length. The spawning period runs from March to July and the eggs and larvae are pelagic. Each female may carry 20 to 60 million eggs. The main spawning areas are found at depths of 200 m from the Bay of Biscay to the Norwegian Sea, at depths of 100 to 300 m off southern Iceland, and at 50 to 300 m in the Mediterranean Sea. They grow rapidly, gaining 8–10 cm in length per year, a 1-year-old fish has a typical length of 20 cm, 2-year-olds 31–35 cm. The females grow at a faster rate than the males. The maximum recorded lifespan is 10 years for males and 14 for females, at which age they attain a length around 200 cm.

Common ling is mainly a solitary and benthic species, which hides among rocks, crevices, and wrecks in deep water, although they are often free swimming in deep water. They are mainly piscivorous and their main prey include species such as Trisopterus esmarkii, Atlantic cod, Atlantic herring, and flatfish, but they also feed on crustaceans (e.g. European lobsters), cephalopods, and echinoderms (e.g. starfish).

== Human uses ==
The ling is edible; it is marketed in fresh, salted, or dried forms, and used as fishmeal. The salted roe of the ling is considered a delicacy in Spain and is known as huevas de maruca. Ling can be made into lutefisk.

The common ling is targeted by commercial fisheries using trawls, although long lines are used in some mainland European- and Faroese-based fisheries. This is a deep-water species and its swim bladder is badly damaged by being brought up to the surface from the depths; the advice for sport anglers is, therefore, that boat-caught ling should not be returned to the sea and that they should stop fishing when enough have been caught for the table. The stock is thought to be reasonably good, but the IUCN has stated that no data are available on the population size or any population trends, that the population in the Mediterranean Sea may be marginal, with the major portion of its global range in the Atlantic. So, no data are available to allow a determination of the status of the ling beyond data deficient. Ling is regarded as a "fish to avoid" for consumers by the Marine Conservation Society because it is trawled. In 1999, the total catch of common ling reported to the Food and Agriculture Organization was 53,870 tonnes and the countries with the largest landings were Norway with 19,215 tonnes and the United Kingdom with 11,350 tonnes.

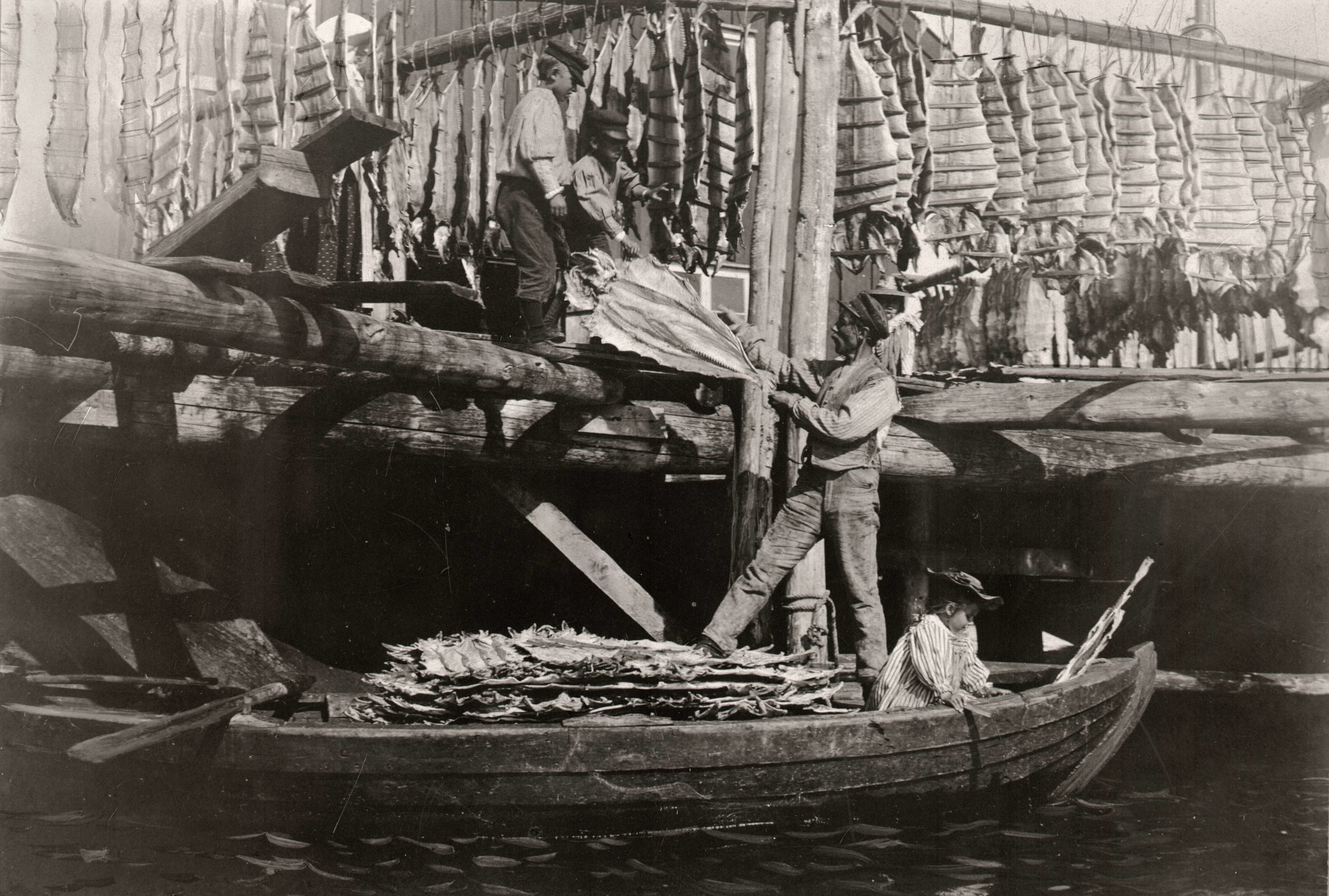
Lings being prepared in Mollösund, Sweden, in 1899

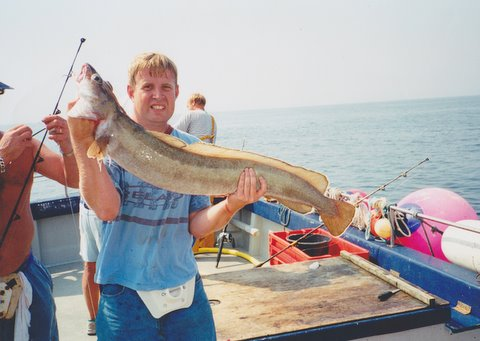
A common ling caught by an angler

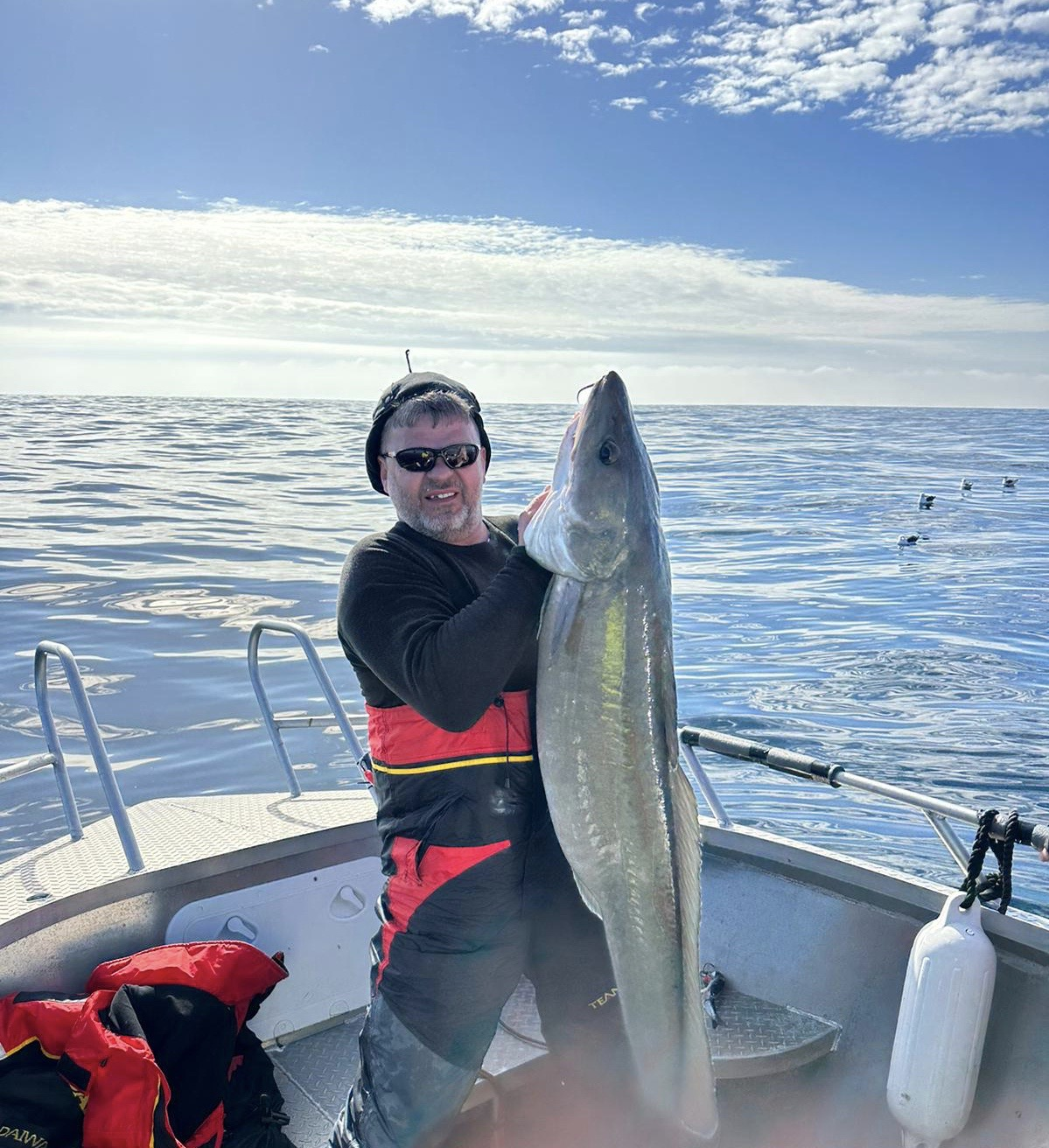
A large ling caught in the North Atlantic
