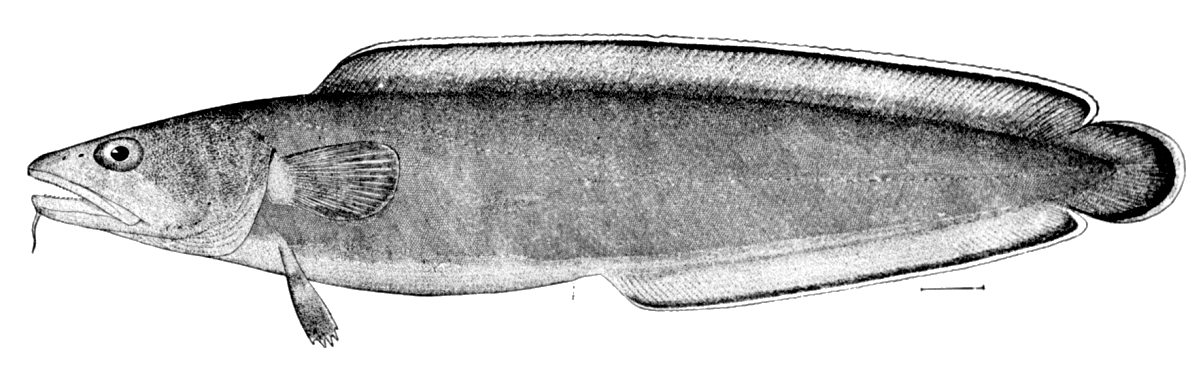

Conservation status
- Least Concern (IUCN 3.1)

Scientific classification
- Kingdom: Animalia
- Phylum: Chordata
- Class: Actinopterygii
- Division: Teleostei
- Order: Gadiformes
- Family: Lotidae
- Genus: Brosme; Oken (ex Cuvier), 1817
- Species: B. brosme

Binomial name
- Brosme brosme (Ascanius, 1772)
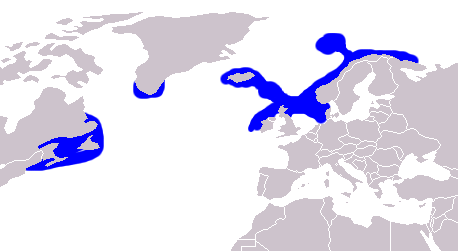
- Distribution of cusk (in blue)

Synonyms
- Gadus brosme Ascanius, 1772; Brosmius brosme (Ascanius, 1772); Enchelyopus brosme (Ascanius, 1772); Gadus torsk Bonnaterre, 1788; Gadus lubb Euphrasen, 1794; Blennius torsk Lacépède, 1800; Brosmius flavescens Lesueur, 1819; Brosmerus flavesny Lesueur, 1819; Brosmius flavesny (Lesueur, 1819); Brosmus vulgaris Fleming, 1828; Brosmius vulgaris (Fleming, 1828); Brosmius scotica Swainson, 1839; Brosmius americanus Gill, 1863

= Brosme =

Cusk

Species of fish

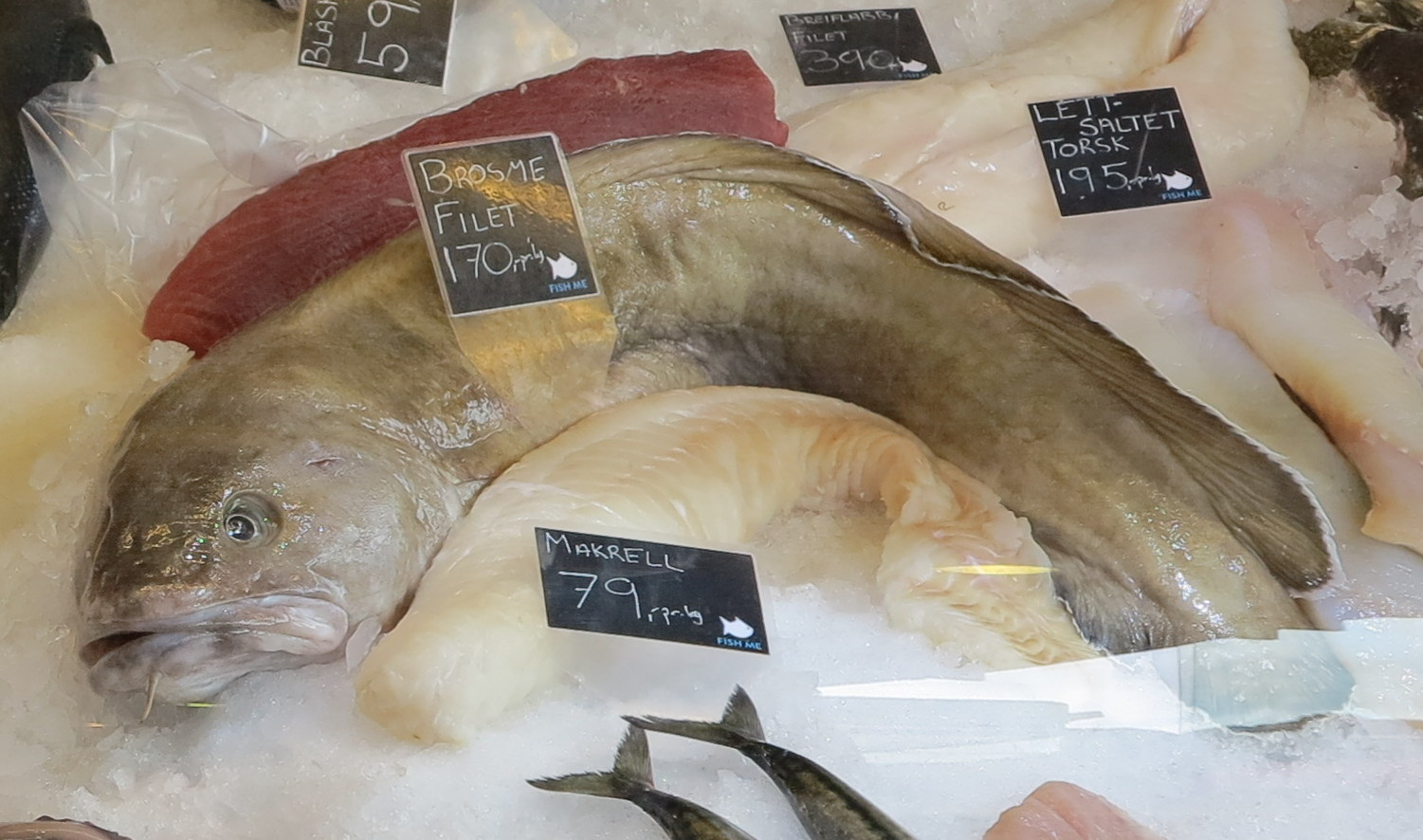
Brosme for sale at the fish market in Bergen, Norway, in 2012

The cusk (Brosme brosme) is a North Atlantic cod-like fish in the ling family Lotidae. It is the only species in the genus Brosme. Its other common names include European cusk, tusk, brosmius and moonfish.

== Description ==
It is easily distinguished at a glance from other cod-like fish, as it has only one dorsal fin. Also characteristic of the fish is the nature of its dorsal, caudal, and anal fins; they are continuous at the base, but separated by very deep notches so that they are obviously distinct. Moreover, the caudal fin is evenly rounded. It is variable in color, from slate to reddish brown above, and paling to gray on the lower sides and underneath. Older fish are usually plain-colored, while the young often have transverse yellow bands on their sides. Their maximum length is about 4 ft (120 cm) and top weight is about 45 lb (20 kg). The IGFA world record stands at 17.2 kg (37 lb 15 oz), caught by Anders Jonasson outside Sørøya in northern Norway.

== Distribution and habitat ==
It is distributed on both sides of the North Atlantic, mostly in moderately deep water. On the North American coast, it is regularly found southward to Cape Cod and occasionally off New Jersey. Its maximum range covers most of the North Atlantic, including the waters around Iceland and the Norwegian coast. It is also found on the Mid-Atlantic Ridge.

Cusk show little genetic differentiation over large distances, except where populations are surrounded by deep-water areas, namely on the Mid-Atlantic Ridge and the Rockall Bank. This suggests deep-water areas are barriers for adult movements, and though they have pelagic eggs and larvae, dispersal during early life stages is not effective over long distances.

It is normally found in water deeper than 600 ft (180 m), and practically always is taken over rough bottoms where rocks, ledges, or gravel are common. Good fishing areas are usually much more limited than is the case with cod, haddock, or pollock. It is an offshore fish and rarely is one taken in a harbor.

It should not be confused with the burbot, which is also called the "freshwater cusk", of a different Lotidae genus.

== Pollution ==
Like many other marine animals, the cusk is directly affected by pollution. A specific pollutant that affects them is inorganic mercury (Hg). Within aquatic ecosystems, mercury can get converted to methylmercury (MeHg), which is one of the most toxic species of mercury compounds. MeHg is subject to biomagnification and bioaccumulation within marine food webs. Cusk are a food source for many other organisms, so the toxins they accumulate over time directly affect any other organism that consumes them, including humans.

Studies conducted in Western Norway, Central Europe, and the Mediterranean have shown that mercury concentrations within fish are highest in wild-marine fish, which sometimes exceed food-safety guidelines of 500 μg/kg, whereas wild-freshwater and farmed fish have less mercury within their system. This is probably due to the fact that most mercury first enters rivers from inland sources and then accumulates in marine environments where the cusk live. In addition to this, it has also been shown that mercury concentrations are higher within fjords rather than coastal and open areas. This is likely due to the morphology of the fjords, or to local human activity.

== Habits ==
It spawns in the spring and summer, usually between April and early July. A medium-sized female has been known to produce more than two million buoyant eggs. The young live near the surface until they are about 2 in (5.1 cm) long, and then seek out rocky ocean floors in deep water.

== Diet ==
It is strictly a bottom-dwelling species, and is sluggish and a rather weak swimmer. It eats crustaceans and other soft-bodied invertebrates and mollusks.

== Fishing technique ==
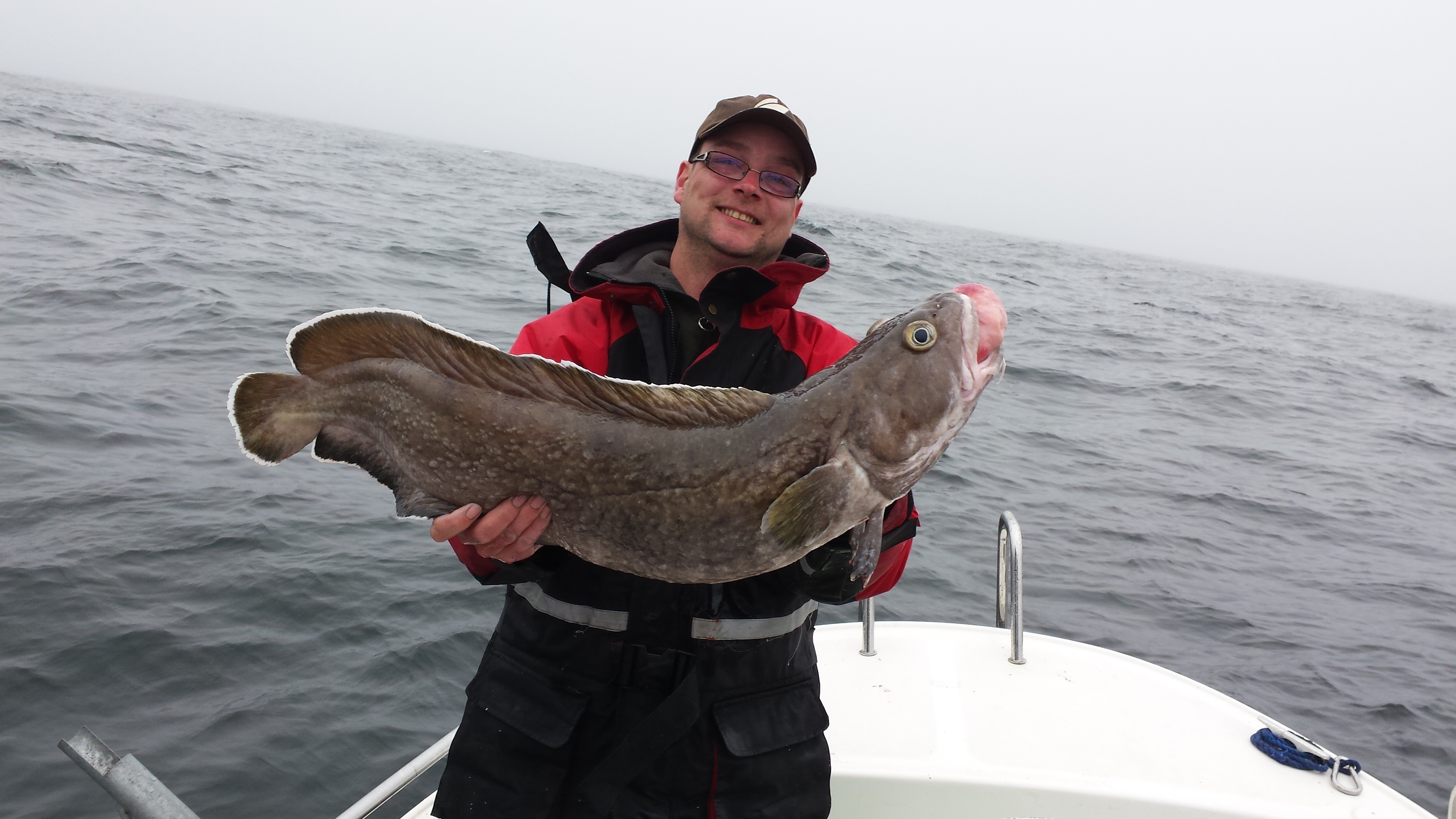
Fisherman with cusk

Cusk are primarily fished on the North American North Atlantic coastal shelf near the American state of Maine and the Canadian Maritimes.

In the Gulf of Maine, cusk are chiefly taken on hook and line. Line trawls account for most of the commercial catch off the New England coast, and most of them are caught during the winter and spring. The commercial catch individuals run between 1 and 2 feet (30 and 61 cm) long, and average about 5 lb (2 kg). It is an excellent food fish. It is marketed as fresh or frozen fillets; a part of the catch is smoked.

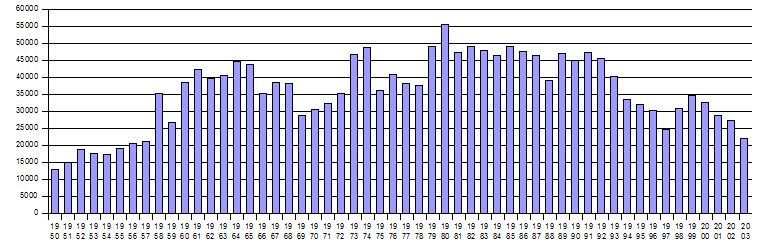
Global annual cusk catches in 1950–2003 from FAO statistics. The highest catch was 55,000 tonnes in 1980.

== Conservation status ==
Although the IUCN Red List regards it as a Least concern species, Fisheries and Oceans Canada (DFO) considers this species endangered based on a 2012 Committee on the Status of Endangered Wildlife in Canada assessment. The status report identified that catches of cusk in the DFO summer bottom-trawl survey had declined by roughly 90% from 1970 to the late 1990s. A landings limit of 1000 mt was put in place in 1999 in the 4X North American Fisheries Organization area and was further restricted to 750 t and expanded to include the 4VWX5Z NAFO areas in 2003. Cusk are still commonly caught as bycatch in the longline and lobster fisheries and can be found in supermarkets in Atlantic Canada despite its threatened status. A study that was conducted in the Gulf of Maine region showed that the conservation status of cusk was partly dependent on future greenhouse gas emissions. Higher emissions showed greater habitat reduction, as much as 80% by the end of the century.

Cusk is a US National Marine Fisheries Service species of concern, which are those species about which the National Oceanic and Atmospheric Administration, National Marine Fisheries Service, has some concerns regarding its conservation status and current threats, but for which insufficient information is available to indicate a need to list the species under the Endangered Species Act. On March 9, 2007, the National Marine Fisheries Service announced the initiation of a status review to determine whether the species warrants listing under the act.
