= Palaeomolva =

Scientific classification
- Domain: Eukaryota
- Kingdom: Animalia
- Phylum: Chordata
- Class: Actinopterygii
- Order: Gadiformes
- Genus: †Palaeomolva; Daniltshenko, 1947

Extinct genus of fishes

Palaeomolva is an extinct genus of prehistoric bony fish.

== See also ==
- Prehistoric fish
- List of prehistoric bony fish
