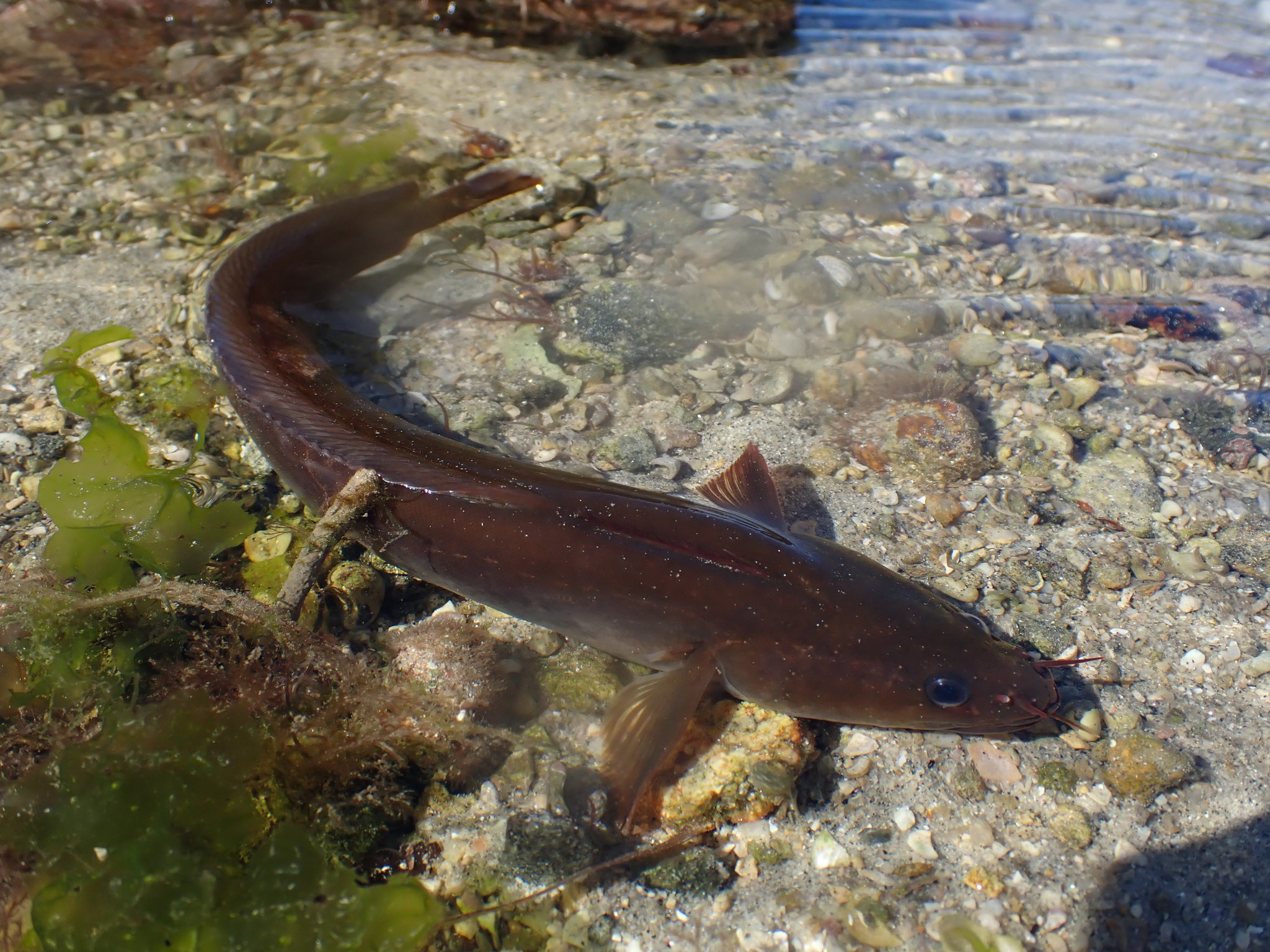
- Shore rockling (Gaidropsarus mediterraneus)

Scientific classification
- Kingdom: Animalia
- Phylum: Chordata
- Class: Actinopterygii
- Division: Teleostei
- Order: Gadiformes
- Suborder: Gadoidei
- Family: Gaidropsaridae; Jordan & Evermann, 1898

Genera
- Ciliata; Enchelyopus; Gaidropsarus

= Gaidropsaridae =

Family of fishes

Gaidropsaridae, the rocklings, are a small family of gadiform fish native to the marine temperate regions of both hemispheres. Species in this genus were formerly placed in the family Lotidae, but phylogenetic evidence affirms them forming their own family.

The following genera are placed in this family:

- Ciliata Couch, 1832
- Enchelyopus Bloch & Schneider, 1801
- Gaidropsarus Rafinesque, 1810
