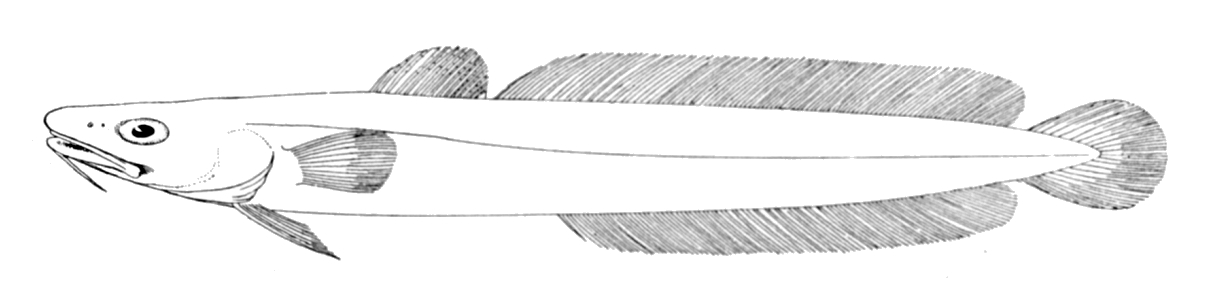
- Common ling, Molva molva

Scientific classification
- Kingdom: Animalia
- Phylum: Chordata
- Class: Actinopterygii
- Order: Gadiformes
- Suborder: Gadoidei
- Family: Lotidae; Bonaparte, 1832

Genera
- Brosme; Lota; Molva

= Lotidae =

Lotidae Temporal range: Early Miocene–present

Family of fishes

The Lotidae are a family of cod-like fishes commonly known as hakes or burbots. They are found in the Arctic and Atlantic Oceans, and some freshwater habitats throughout the temperate Northern Hemisphere. All species are marine, except for the burbot, Lota lota, found in rivers and lakes in northern Europe, Siberia, and North America. They are important commercial and game fish species.

Members of the Gaidropsaridae were previously also placed in this family.

The fossil genus †Palaeomolva Daniltshenko, 1947 is known from the Miocene.
