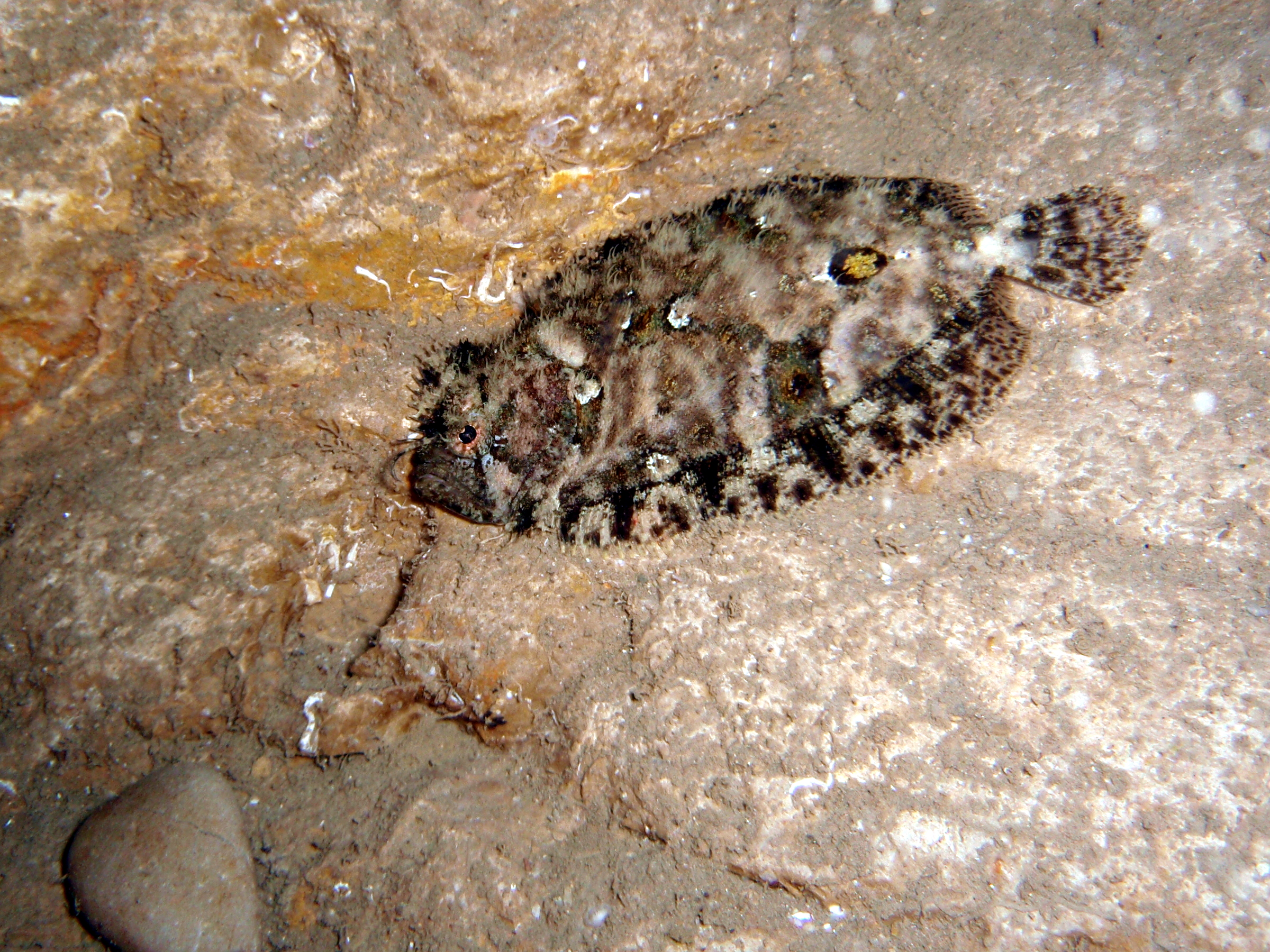

Conservation status
- Least Concern (IUCN 3.1)

Scientific classification
- Kingdom: Animalia
- Phylum: Chordata
- Class: Actinopterygii
- Division: Teleostei
- Order: Carangiformes
- Suborder: Pleuronectoidei
- Family: Scophthalmidae
- Genus: Zeugopterus
- Species: Z. regius

Binomial name
- Zeugopterus regius (Bonnaterre, 1788)

Synonyms
- Phrynorhombus regius (Bonnaterre, 1788); Pleuronectes regius (Bonnaterre, 1788); Phrynorhombus unimaculatus (Risso, 1820)

= Zeugopterus regius =

Species of fish

Zeugopterus regius, Eckström's topknot or Bloch's topknot, is a small, left eyed flatfish in the turbot family Scophthalmidae found in European waters.

== Description ==
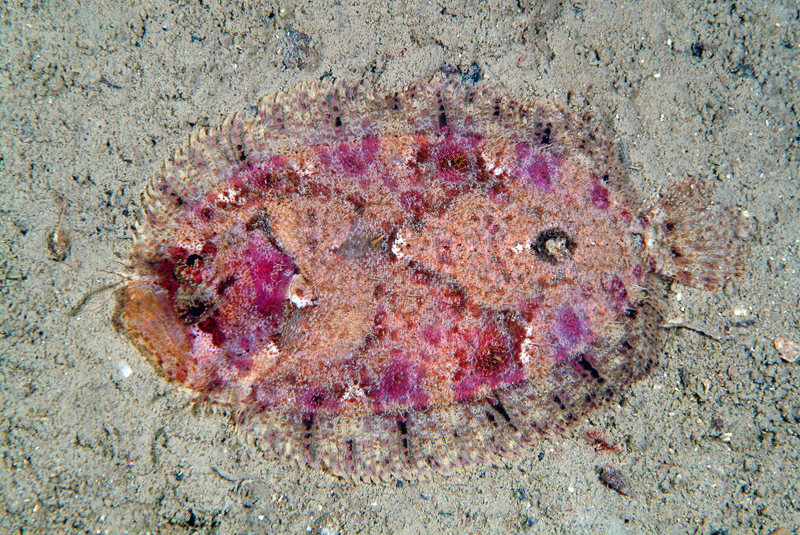

Zeugopterus regius is a relatively broad bodied, left-eyed flatfish which has a small head with a deep notch to the front of the upper eye. The anal and dorsal fins continue on to the underside of the body, forming distinct lobes. It is pale brown in colour with irregular darker patches and a dark blotch towards the tail end. The maximum length of an adult fish is around 20 centimetres (7.9 in).

== Biology ==
Zeugopterus regius is found over rocky substrates, less frequently on sandy seafloors. It feeds on invertebrates and small fish. The breeding season falls between February and August. It is sometimes found on the underside or rock overhangs but not as often as its cogener, the common topknot, Zeugopterus punctatus.

== Distribution ==
This is a fish of the eastern Atlantic, occurring from the British Isles to Morocco and extending into the western Mediterranean and the Adriatic Sea.
