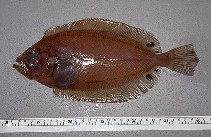

Conservation status
- Least Concern (IUCN 3.1)

Scientific classification
- Kingdom: Animalia
- Phylum: Chordata
- Class: Actinopterygii
- Order: Carangiformes
- Suborder: Pleuronectoidei
- Family: Scophthalmidae
- Genus: Lepidorhombus
- Species: L. boscii

Binomial name
- Lepidorhombus boscii (Risso, 1810)

Synonyms
- Pleuronectes boscii Risso, 1810; Arnoglossus boscii (Risso, 1810); Hippoglossus boscii (Risso, 1810); Rhombus boscii (Risso, 1810)

= Lepidorhombus boscii =

Four-spot megrim

Species of fish

The four-spot megrim (Lepidorhombus boscii) is a species of flatfish in the family Scophthalmidae. It is found a depths between 7 and 800 m (23 and 2,625 ft) (typically between 100–450 m) in the northeast Atlantic and Mediterranean. It reaches a length of 40 cm (16 in). It can be separated from its close relative, the megrim or whiff (L. whiffiagonis), by the dark spots towards the rear of the fins.

In Spanish it is known as gallo de cuatro manchas (or more often, simply gallo), sometimes (depending on the region or city) ojito. In Galician it is rapante or meiga de catro manchas and in Catalan it is palaia bruixa de quatre taques, serrandell or llisèria. In France it is known as cardine à quatre taches.
