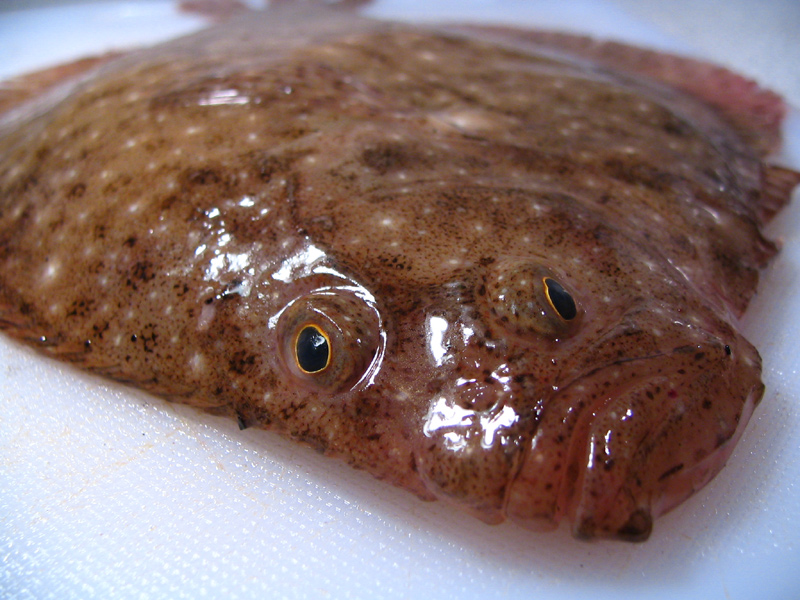

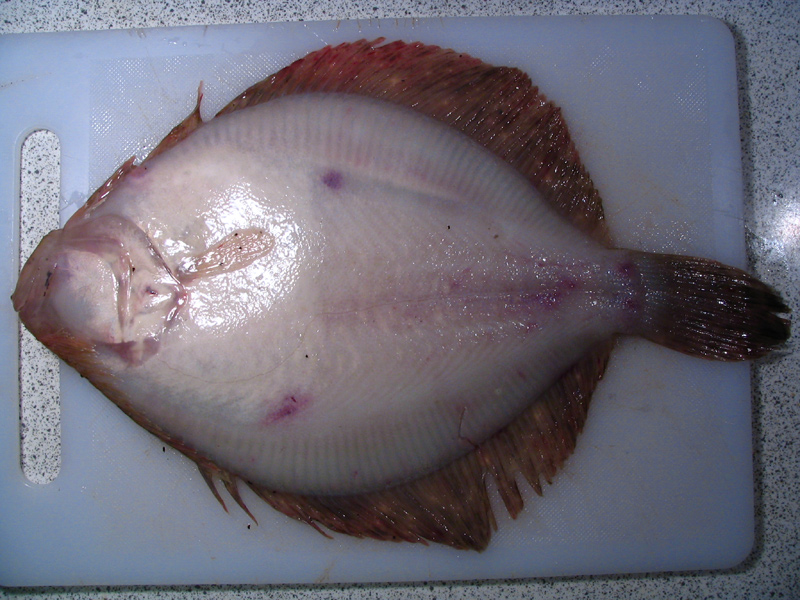

Scientific classification
- Kingdom: Animalia
- Phylum: Chordata
- Class: Actinopterygii
- Order: Carangiformes
- Suborder: Pleuronectoidei
- Family: Scophthalmidae
- Genus: Scophthalmus
- Species: S. aquosus

Binomial name
- Scophthalmus aquosus (Mitchill, 1815)

Synonyms
- Pleuronectes aquosus Mitchill, 1815

= Windowpane flounder =

Species of fish

The windowpane flounder (Scophthalmus aquosus) is a species of fish in the family Scophthalmidae. It is widespread at a depth of 5–73 meters in the western Atlantic from the Gulf of St. Lawrence in Canada to Florida in the United States. An important commercial species, they can grow up to 45.7 cm in length, and live up to 7 years.
