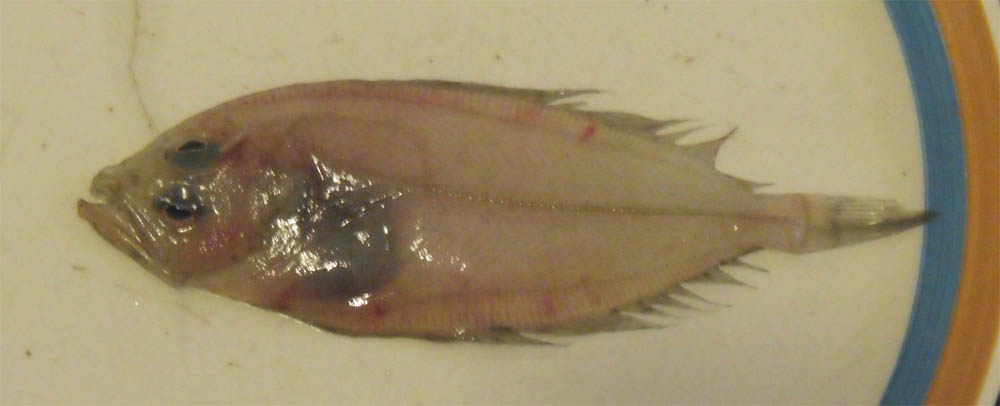

Scientific classification
- Domain: Eukaryota
- Kingdom: Animalia
- Phylum: Chordata
- Class: Actinopterygii
- Order: Carangiformes
- Suborder: Pleuronectoidei
- Family: Scophthalmidae
- Genus: Lepidorhombus
- Species: L. whiffiagonis

Binomial name
- Lepidorhombus whiffiagonis (Walbaum, 1792)

Synonyms
- Lepidorhombus megastoma Donovan, 1804; Pleuronectes megastoma Donovan, 1804; Pleuronectes pseudopalus Pennant, 1812; Pleuronectes whiffiagonis Walbaum, 1792; Rhombus (Lepidorhombus) whiffiagonis (Walbaum, 1792)

= Megrim =

Species of fish

The megrim, megrim sole, whiff, or Cornish sole (Lepidorhombus whiffiagonis) is a species of left-eyed flatfish in the family Scophthalmidae. It is found in the northeast Atlantic and Mediterranean Sea between 100 and 700 m (330 and 2,300 ft) below sea level. It is caught commercially by some countries.

== Description ==
It can grow up to 60 cm (24 in) in length. It is left-eyed, has a slightly larger head than usual in flatfish, and with a narrower body than usual. The dorsal and ventral fins are relatively short and start far back on the body. The colouration is usually light brown with dark spots across the body and dark grey fins. It lacks the highly distinct dark spots found on the fins in its close relative, the four-spot megrim (L. boscii).

== Habitat ==
The megrim is usually found over a sandy or muddy sea floor. They are predators and eat small fish and squid and also consume crustaceans. In turn megrim are themselves prey for larger species such as sharks, seals and large cod. Megrim spawn in deep waters off Iceland and the west of Ireland, while there is a separate spawning population in the Mediterranean.

== Range ==
This species is found throughout European waters and the Northeast Atlantic including the Sea of the Hebrides. Megrim are also found off the north coast of Africa and in parts of the Mediterranean.

== Commercial value ==
Megrim is commercially valuable and is caught by a number of nations around Europe, usually by bottom trawling, and is directly targeted in some fisheries, whereas in others it is retained as a valuable bycatch. France and Spain are the largest markets for megrim, and before Brexit most of the megrim caught in British water was exported to these nations.

Megrim can be cooked in a number of different ways with grilling, baking, frying and poaching all effective ways of preparing this species. It has been described as being similar to sole or plaice in terms of preparation, but not being comparable in terms of flavour or texture.

For many years there was a drive in Britain to get people to eat more megrim as a way of taking pressure off overexploited fish such as cod and haddock, Following the export difficulties after Brexit, there is a renewed drive to find UK customers, which includes using the alternative name of Cornish sole to make it more appealing to domestic consumers.
