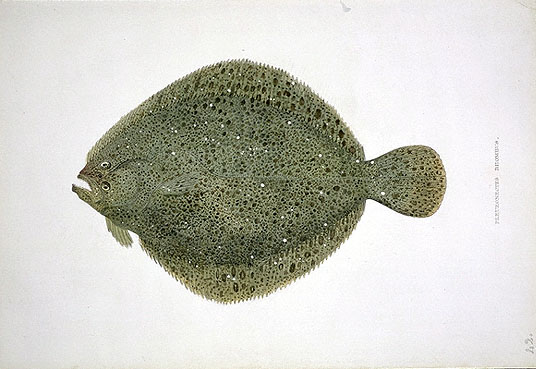

Conservation status
- Least Concern (IUCN 3.1)

Scientific classification
- Kingdom: Animalia
- Phylum: Chordata
- Class: Actinopterygii
- Division: Teleostei
- Order: Carangiformes
- Suborder: Pleuronectoidei
- Family: Scophthalmidae
- Genus: Scophthalmus
- Species: S. rhombus

Binomial name
- Scophthalmus rhombus (Linnaeus, 1758)

Synonyms
- Pleuronectes laevis Turton, 1802; Pleuronectes rhombus Linnaeus, 1758; Rhombus laevis (Turton, 1802)

= Brill (fish) =

Species of fish

The brill, Scophthalmus rhombus, is a species of flatfish in the turbot family (Scophthalmidae) of the order Pleuronectiformes. Brill can be found in the northeast Atlantic, Black Sea, Baltic Sea, and Mediterranean, primarily in deeper offshore waters. Brill are usually in shallow waters or below 100 meters at seafloor. Brill prefers to live on the surface that is either sandy or muddy depending on where they are.

Brill have slender bodies, brown covered with lighter and darker coloured flecks, excluding the tailfin; the underside of the fish is usually cream coloured or pinkish white. Like other flatfish the brill has the ability to match its colour to the surroundings. The Brill average lifespan is 6 years and they weigh up to 8 kg (18 lb) and can reach a length of 75 cm (2 ft 6 in), but are less than half that on average. Part of the dorsal fin of the fish is not connected to the fin membrane, giving the fish a frilly appearance. They are sometimes confused with the turbot (Scophthalmus maximus), which is more diamond-shaped. The two species are related and can produce hybrids. On the west coast of Canada (outside the range of Scophthalmus rhombus) local fisherman refer to the petrale sole, Eopsetta jordani, as brill. The flesh is lighter in texture, more friable - even "floury" - and considerably less rich in flavour than the turbot, which is preferred by chefs.

== Name in other languages ==
Brill
Language	Name
Galician	Coruxo
French	Barbue
Italian	Rombo Liscio
Catalan	Rèmol
Croatian	Romb
Danish	Slethvar
Dutch	Griet
Polish	Nagład
Swedish	Slätvar
Norwegian	Slettvar
German	Glattbutt
Romanian	Calcan
Greek	Καλκάνι (Calcani)
Māori	Patikinui
Portuguese	Rodovalho
Slovene	Gladki romb
Spanish	Rombo
Turkish	Kalkan
Finnish	Silokampela
Ukrainian	Калкан гладенький
Estonian	Sile kammeljas
Lithuanian	Uotas

== Sources ==
- Scophthalmus rhombus Marine Life Encyclopedia
- Froese, Rainer; Pauly, Daniel (eds.). "Scophthalmus rhombus". FishBase. February 2006 version.
- "Scophthalmus rhombus". Integrated Taxonomic Information System.
