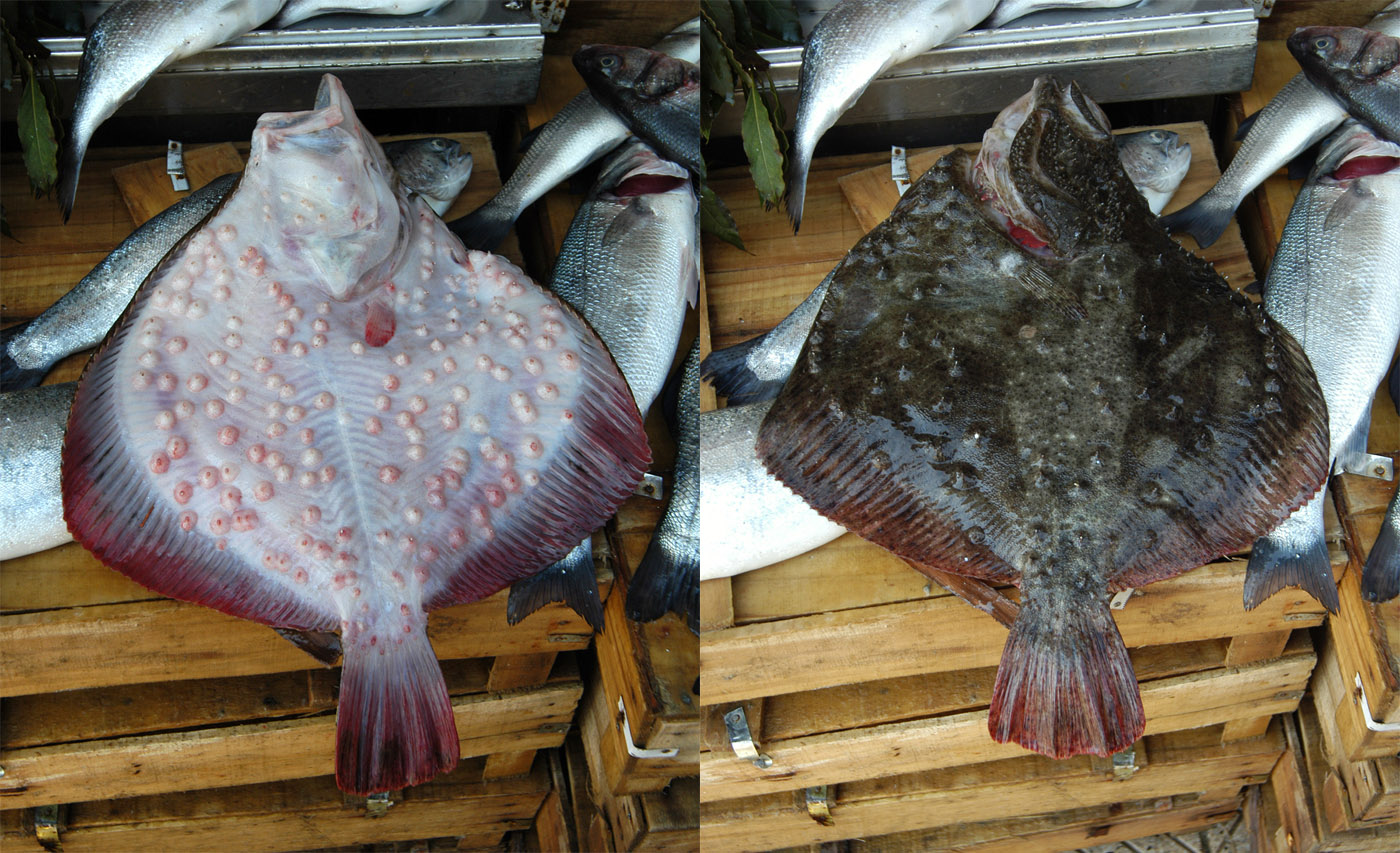
- Black Sea turbot on both sides

Scientific classification
- Kingdom: Animalia
- Phylum: Chordata
- Class: Actinopterygii
- Order: Carangiformes
- Suborder: Pleuronectoidei
- Family: Scophthalmidae
- Genus: Scophthalmus
- Species: S. maeoticus

Binomial name
- Scophthalmus maeoticus (Pallas, 1814)

Synonyms
- List: Bothus maeoticus (Pallas, 1814); Pleuronectes maeoticus Pallas, 1814; Psetta maeotica (Pallas, 1814); Psetta maxima subsp. maeotica (Pallas, 1814); Rhombus maeoticus (Pallas, 1814); Rhombus torosus Rathke, 1836; Scophthalmus maximus subsp. maeoticus (Pallas, 1814)

= Scophthalmus maeoticus =

Species of fish

Scophthalmus maeoticus (Black Sea turbot or kalkan) is a fish species in the family Scophthalmidae. It is widespread in the Black Sea. It is sometimes treated as a subspecies of the turbot, Scophthalmus maximus, which is common in the Mediterranean Sea. The taxonomic status of this species is under discussion. It is an important commercial species.
