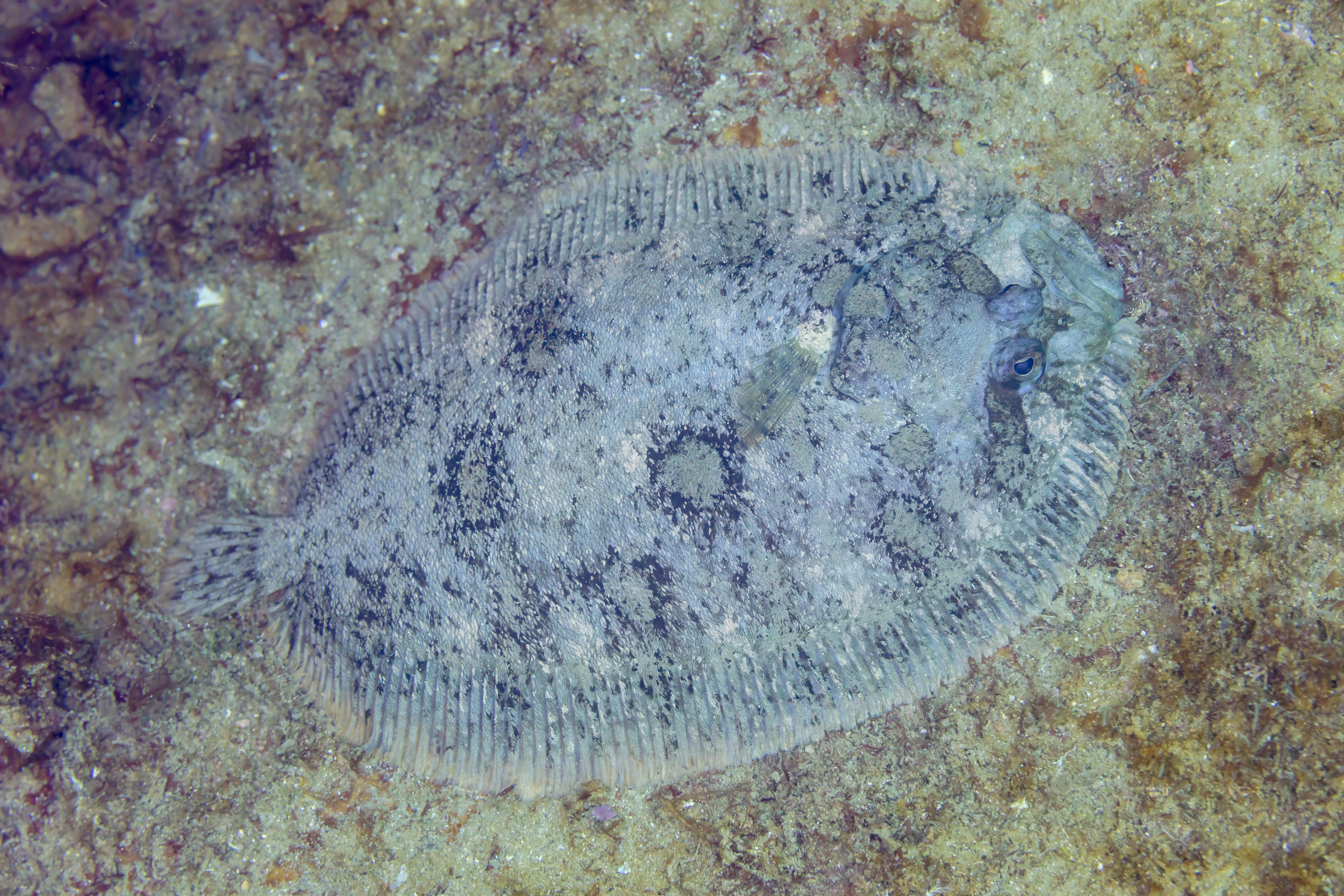

Conservation status
- Least Concern (IUCN 3.1)

Scientific classification
- Kingdom: Animalia
- Phylum: Chordata
- Class: Actinopterygii
- Division: Teleostei
- Order: Carangiformes
- Suborder: Pleuronectoidei
- Family: Scophthalmidae
- Genus: Zeugopterus
- Species: Z. norvegicus

Binomial name
- Zeugopterus norvegicus (Günther, 1862)

Synonyms
- Rhombus norvegicus Günther, 1862; Phrynorhombus norvegicus Günther, 1862

= Norwegian topknot =

Genus/ Species of fish

Zeugopterus norvegicus, the Norwegian topknot, is a species of turbot native to the northeastern Atlantic Ocean. This species grows to a length of 12 centimetres (4.7 in) SL. This species is sometimes classified in the monotypic genus Phrynorhombus.
