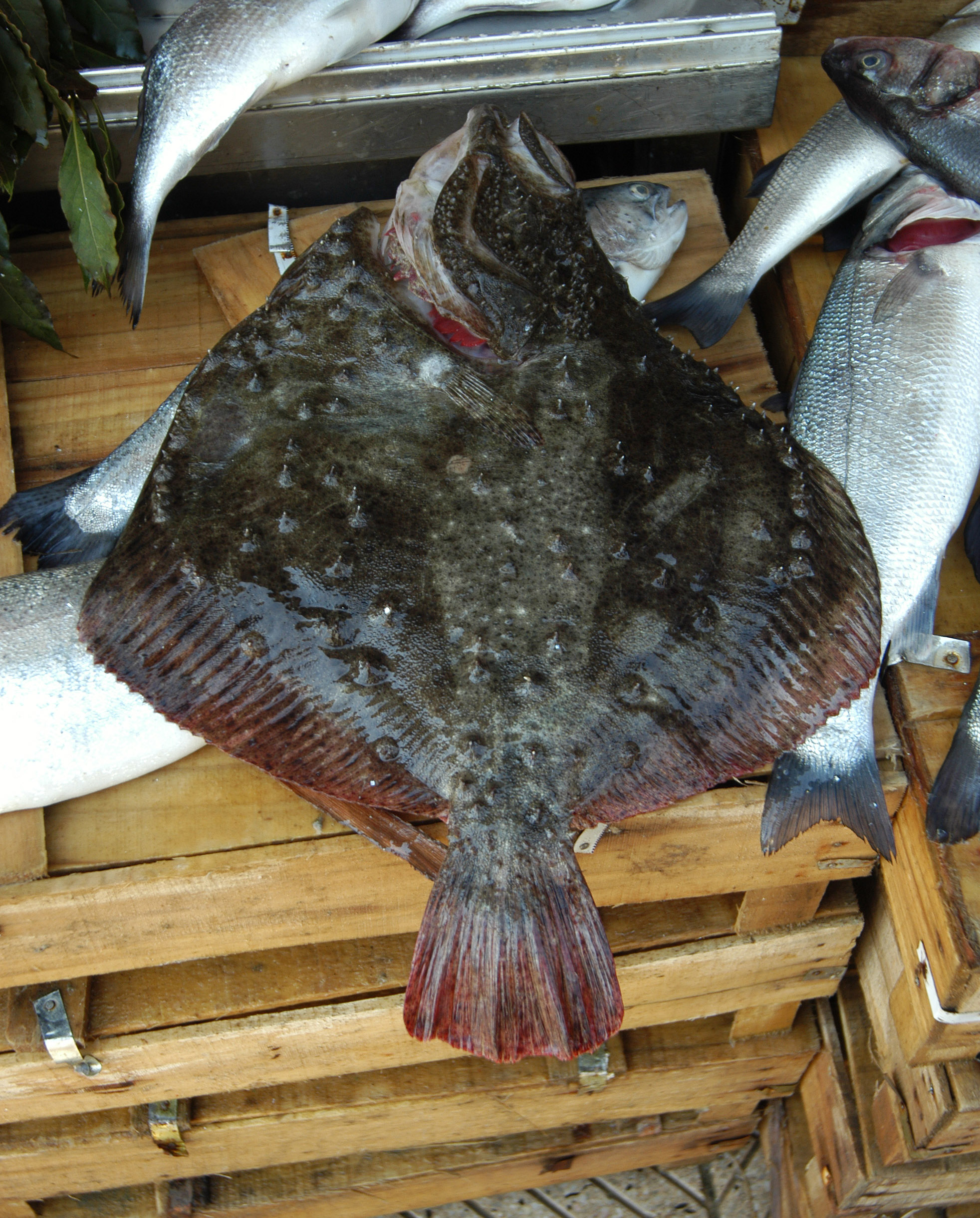
- S. maeoticus

Scientific classification
- Kingdom: Animalia
- Phylum: Chordata
- Class: Actinopterygii
- Order: Carangiformes
- Suborder: Pleuronectoidei
- Family: Scophthalmidae
- Genus: Scophthalmus; Rafinesque, 1810

Type species
- Pleuronectes rhombus Linnaeus, 1758

Synonyms
- Lophopsetta Gill, 1861; Psetta Swainson, 1839; Rhomboides Goldfuss, 1820; Rhombus Cuvier, 1816

= Scophthalmus =

Scophthalmus Temporal range: Early Oligocene–present

Genus of fishes

Scophthalmus is a genus of turbots, relatively large flatfish native to the northeast Atlantic Ocean, Baltic Sea, Mediterranean Sea and Black Sea. The name comes from the Greek words σκόπελος (skópelos) and ὀφθαλμός (ophthalmós) "eye", where σκόπελος would mean according to Liddell & Scott "lookout place, promontory", and according to P. Romero "lanternfish".

== Species ==
There are currently four recognized species in this genus:

- Scophthalmus aquosus (Mitchill, 1815) (Windowpane flounder)
- Scophthalmus maeoticus (Pallas, 1814) (Black-Sea Turbot)
- Scophthalmus maximus (Linnaeus, 1758) (Turbot)
- Scophthalmus rhombus (Linnaeus, 1758) (Brill)

The fossil species †Scophthalmus stamatini (Paucă, 1931), the earliest known fossil scophthalmid, is known from the Early Oligocene of Poland and Romania.
