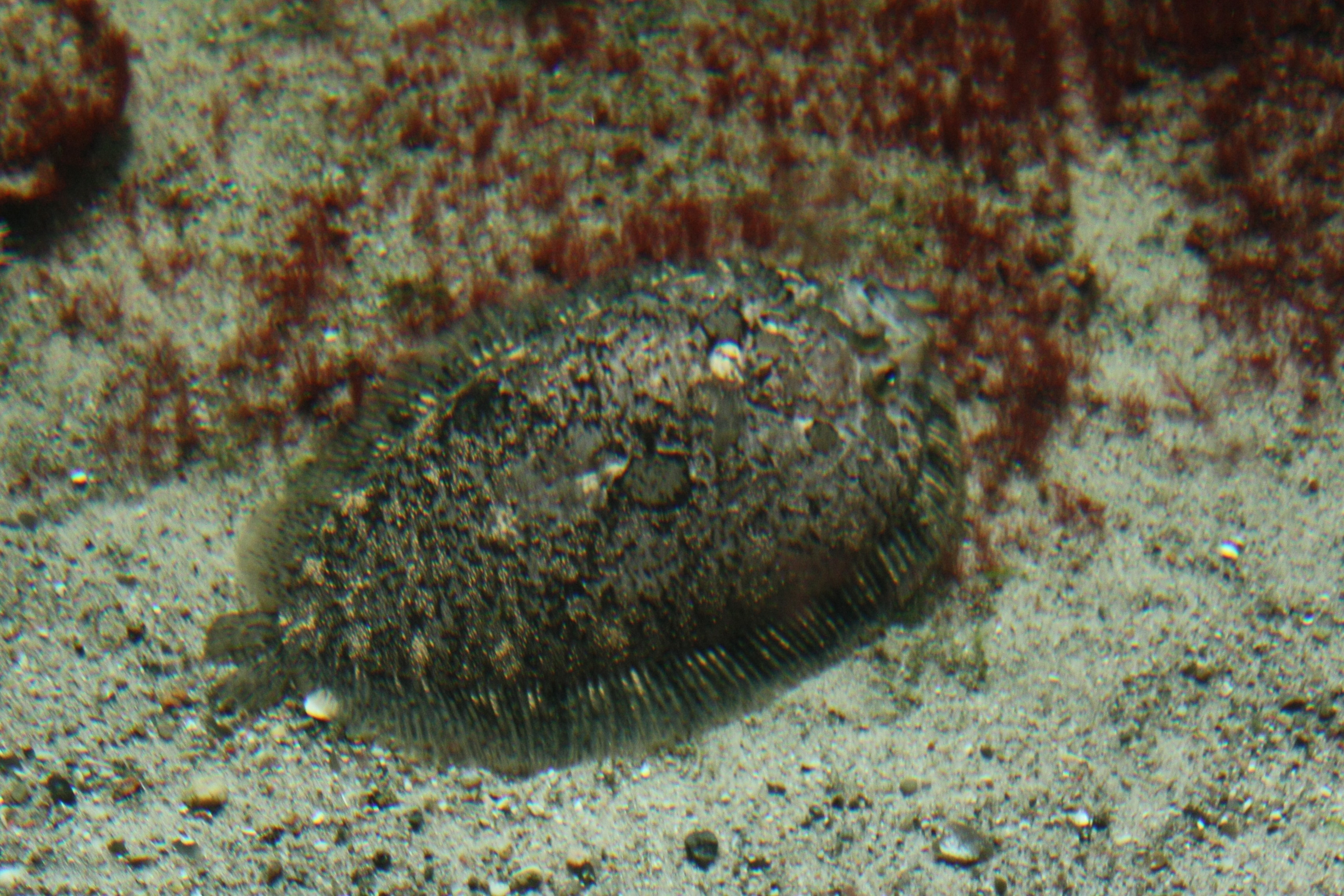
- Topknot (Z. punctatus)
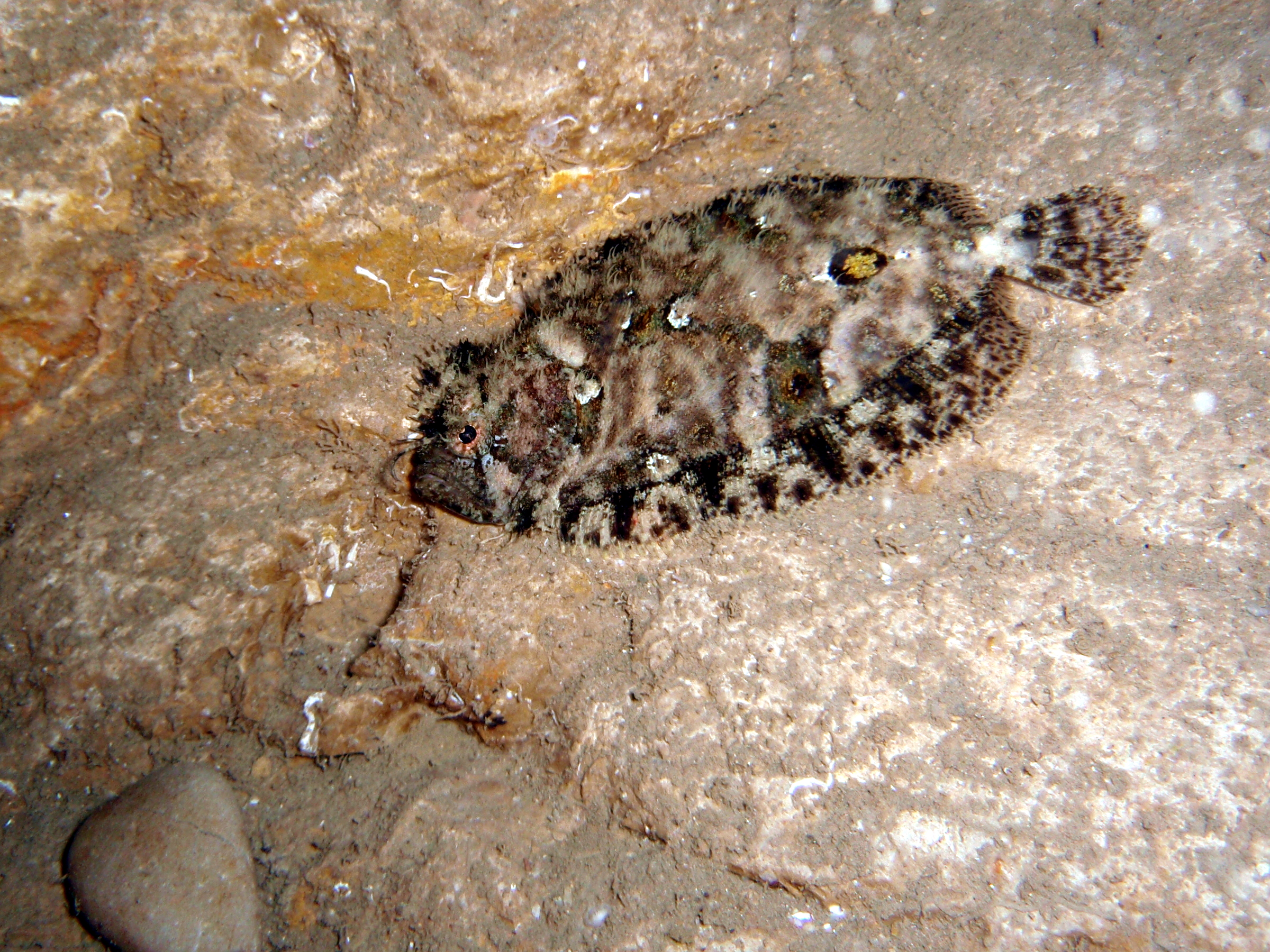
- Eckström's Topknot (Z. regius)

Scientific classification
- Kingdom: Animalia
- Phylum: Chordata
- Class: Actinopterygii
- Order: Carangiformes
- Suborder: Pleuronectoidei
- Family: Scophthalmidae
- Genus: Zeugopterus; Gottsche, 1835

Type species
- Pleuronectes hirtus Müller, 1789

Synonyms
- Phrynorhombus Günther, 1862

= Zeugopterus =

Genus of fishes

Zeugopterus is a genus of turbots native to the north Atlantic Ocean. The three species reach a maximum length of 20–25 cm (7.9–9.8 in). Most species in this genus are referred to as topknots.

== Species ==
There are currently three recognized species in this genus:

- Zeugopterus norvegicus (Günther, 1862) (Norwegian topknot)
- Zeugopterus punctatus (Bloch, 1787) (Topknot)
- Zeugopterus regius (Bonnaterre, 1788) (Eckström's topknot)
