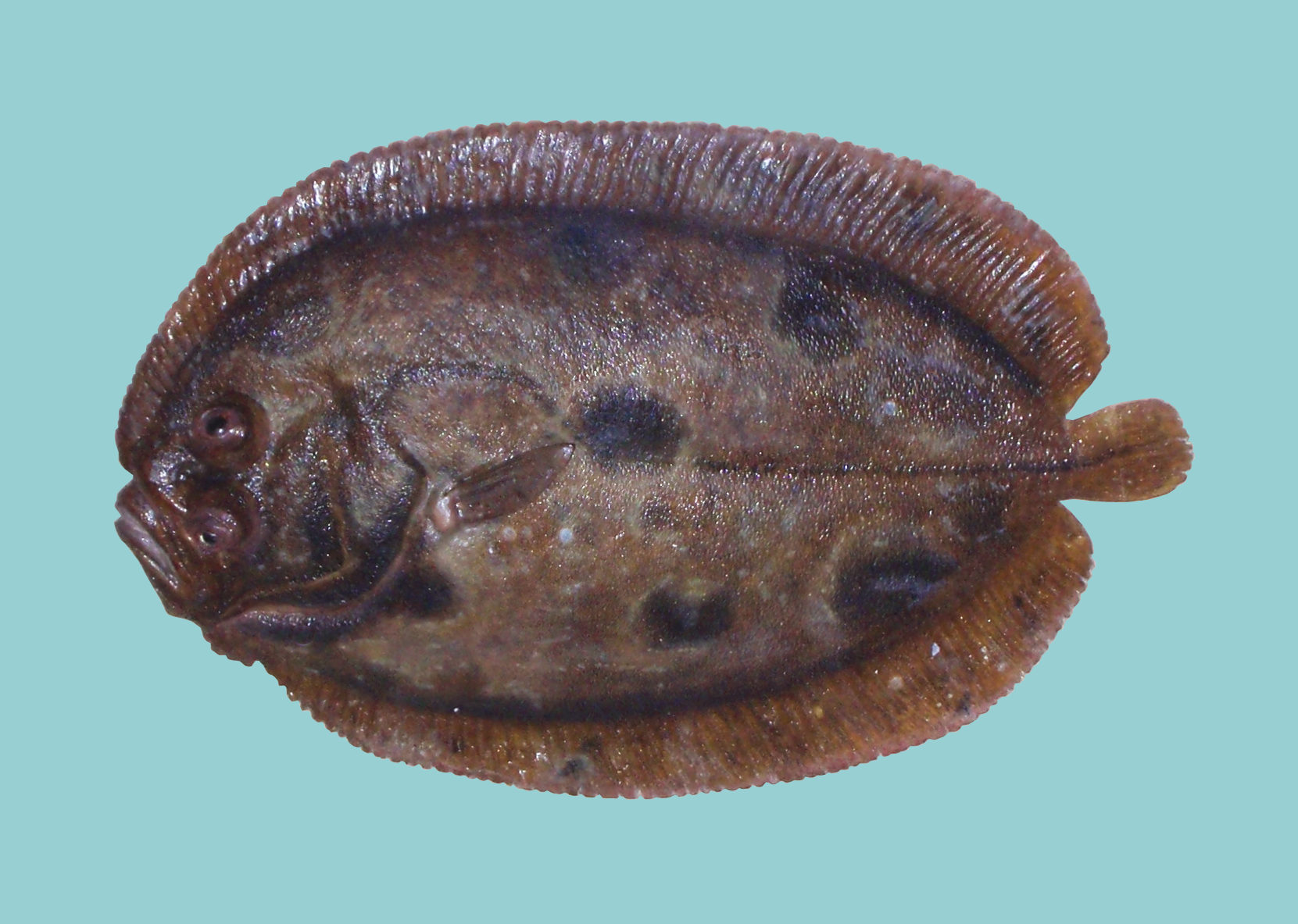

Conservation status
- Least Concern (IUCN 3.1)

Scientific classification
- Kingdom: Animalia
- Phylum: Chordata
- Class: Actinopterygii
- Order: Carangiformes
- Suborder: Pleuronectoidei
- Family: Scophthalmidae
- Genus: Zeugopterus
- Species: Z. punctatus

Binomial name
- Zeugopterus punctatus (Bloch, 1787)

Synonyms
- Pleuronectes punctatus Bloch, 1787

= Zeugopterus punctatus =

Species of fish

Zeugopterus punctatus, the common topknot, is a species of left eyed flatfish in the family Scophthalmidae, from the eastern Atlantic Ocean.

== Description ==
Zeugopterus punctatus is a small left-sided flatfish that is almost completely round in shape, with a broad body relative to its length. It is a mottled brown and white colour, a dark bar through the eyes, light wide fins all the way round its body and a very small tail. Unlike most other flatfish, Zeugopterus punctatus does not seem to change colour for camouflage but relies on immobility to avoid detection. Zeugopterus punctatus grows to a maximum length of about 25 cm (10 in). It is sometimes confused with the lemon sole Microstomus kitti which can be found on rocky substrates too but has a noticeable pattern on its back, does not have such long fins and is a more pointed shape. The eyed side is covered in small ctenoid scales while the blind side has cycloid scales, the many small ctenoid scales feel downy to the touch.

== Distribution ==
The eastern Atlantic Ocean including the North Sea, Baltic Sea, English Channel, Bay of Biscay south to the coast of Portugal.

== Biology ==
This species lives along coastlines. It is unusual among European flatfish in that it prefers a rocky substrate. It has the ability to remain immobile in the most surprising sites, holding on to vertical rocks or even upside down under overhangs. This is achieved by using its broad fringing fins to fit itself into the substrate. Spawning takes place between February and June.

It is carnivorous, feeding on small fish and crustaceans.
