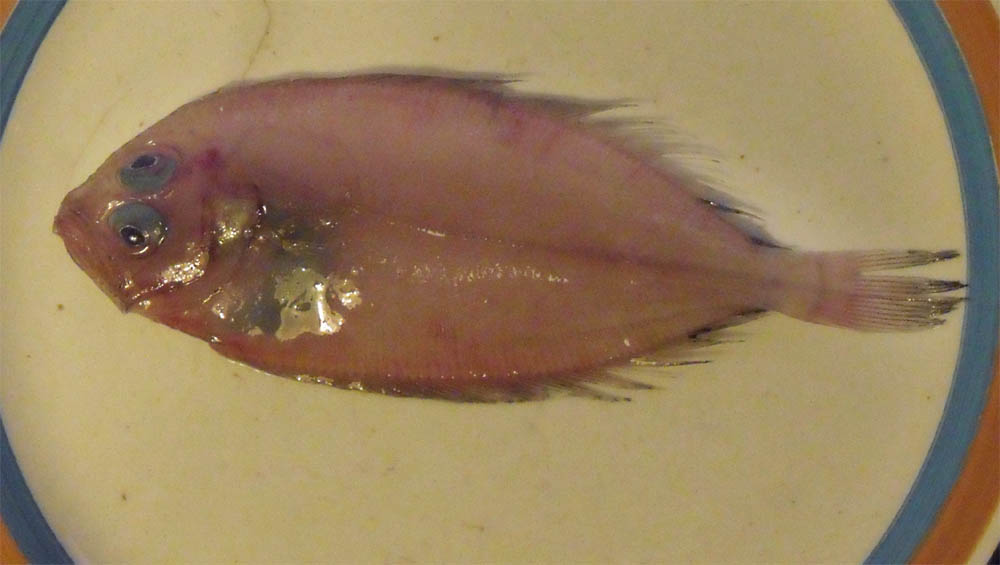
- Four-spot Megrim (L. boscii)

Scientific classification
- Domain: Eukaryota
- Kingdom: Animalia
- Phylum: Chordata
- Class: Actinopterygii
- Order: Carangiformes
- Suborder: Pleuronectoidei
- Family: Scophthalmidae
- Genus: Lepidorhombus; Günther, 1862

Type species
- Pleuronectes megastoma Donovan, 1804

= Lepidorhombus =

Genus of fishes

Lepidorhombus is a genus of turbots native to the northeastern Atlantic Ocean.

== Species ==
There are currently two recognized species in this genus:

- Lepidorhombus boscii (A. Risso, 1810) (Four-spot megrim)
- Lepidorhombus whiffiagonis (Walbaum, 1792) (Megrim)
