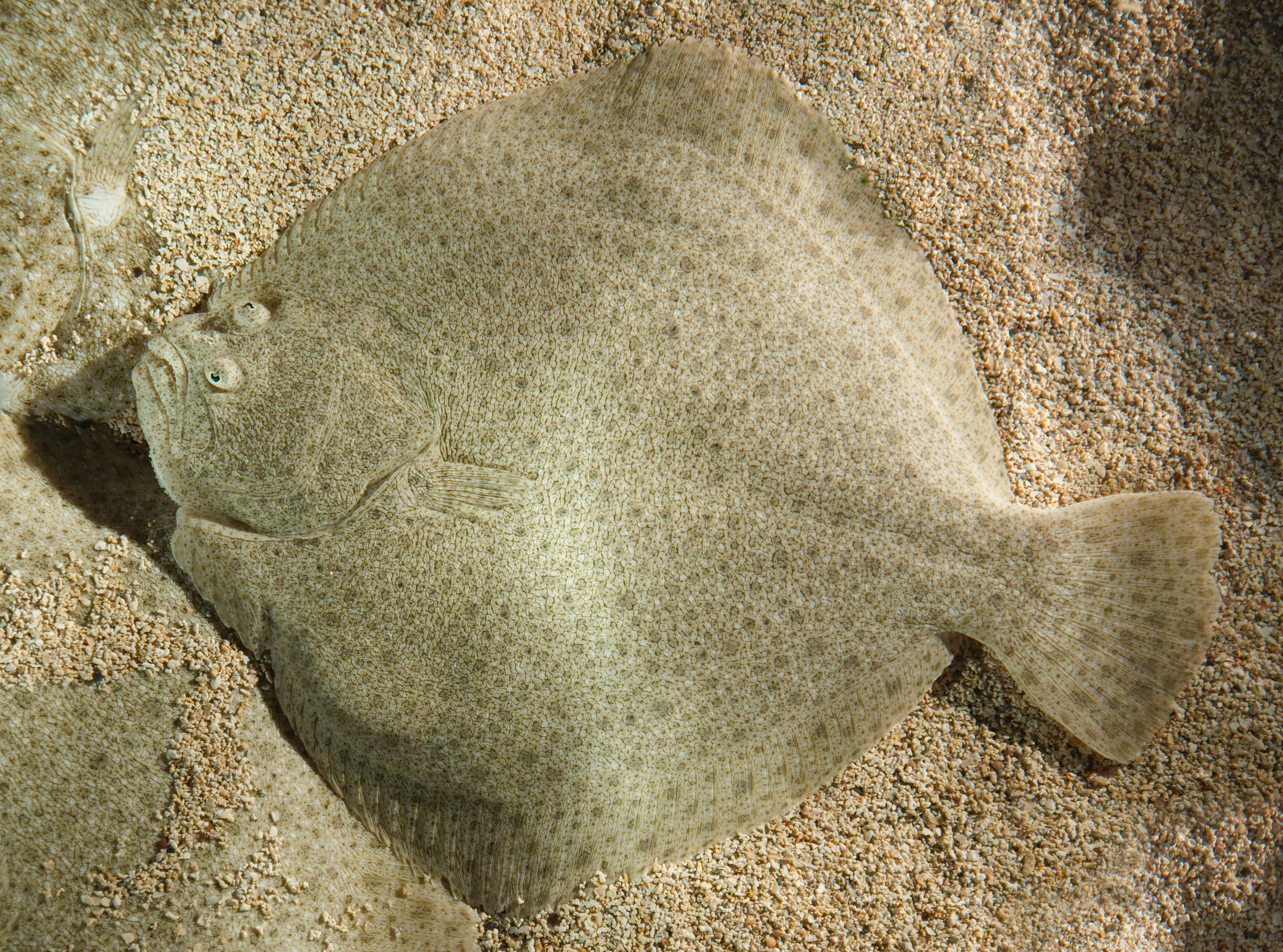

Conservation status
- Least Concern (IUCN 3.1)

Scientific classification
- Kingdom: Animalia
- Phylum: Chordata
- Class: Actinopterygii
- Division: Teleostei
- Order: Carangiformes
- Suborder: Pleuronectoidei
- Family: Scophthalmidae
- Genus: Scophthalmus
- Species: S. maximus

Binomial name
- Scophthalmus maximus (Linnaeus, 1758)

Synonyms
- List: Pleuronectes cyclops Donovan, 1806; Pleuronectes maximus Linnaeus, 1758; Pleuronectes turbot Lacépède, 1802; Psetta maxima (Linnaeus, 1758); Psetta maxima maxima (Linnaeus, 1758); Rhombus aculeatus Gottsche, 1835; Rhombus magnus Minding, 1832; Rhombus maximus (Linnaeus, 1758); Rhombus stellosus Bennett, 1835; Scophthalmus ponticus Ninni, 1932

= Turbot =

Species of flatfish in the family Scophthalmidae

Capture (blue) and aquaculture (green) production of turbot (Scophthalmus maximus) in thousand tonnes from 1950 to 2022, as reported by the FAO

The turbot (/ˈtɜːrbət/ TUR-bət), Scophthalmus maximus, is a relatively large species of flatfish in the family Scophthalmidae. It is a demersal fish native to marine or brackish waters of the Northeast Atlantic, Baltic Sea and the Mediterranean Sea. It is an important food fish. Turbot in the Black Sea were often included in this species, but are now generally regarded as separate: the Black Sea turbot or kalkan (S. maeoticus). True turbot are not found in the Northwest Atlantic; the "turbot" of that region, which was involved in the so-called "Turbot War" between Canada and Spain, is the Greenland halibut or Greenland turbot (Reinhardtius hippoglossoides). The name turbot can refer to any member of the family Scolopthalmidae, and some other flatfish have similar common names (e.g., spiny turbots of the genus Psettodes).

== Etymology ==
The word comes from the Old French tourbout, which may be a derivative of the Latin turbo ('spinning top'), a possible reference to its shape. Another possible origin of the Old French word is from Old Swedish törnbut, from törn 'thorn' + -but 'stump, butt, flatfish', which may also be a reference to its shape (compare native English halibut). Early reference to the turbot can be found in a satirical poem ("The Emperor's Fish") by Juvenal, a Roman poet of the late 1st and early 2nd centuries AD, suggesting this fish was a delicacy in the Roman empire.

== Description ==
The turbot is a large left eyed flatfish found primarily close to shore in sandy shallow waters throughout the Mediterranean, the Baltic Sea, the Black Sea, and the North Atlantic. The European turbot has an asymmetric disk-shaped body, and has been known to grow up to one metre (40 inches) long and 25 kilograms (55 pounds) in weight.

== Fisheries ==
Turbot is highly prized as a food fish for its delicate flavour, and is also known as brat, breet, or britt. It is a valuable commercial species, acquired through aquaculture and trawling. Turbot are farmed in Bulgaria, Canada, France, Spain, Portugal, Romania, Turkey, Chile, Norway, and China.

Turbot has a bright white flesh that retains this appearance when cooked. Like all flatfish, turbot yields four fillets with meatier topside portions that may be baked, poached, steamed, or pan-fried.
