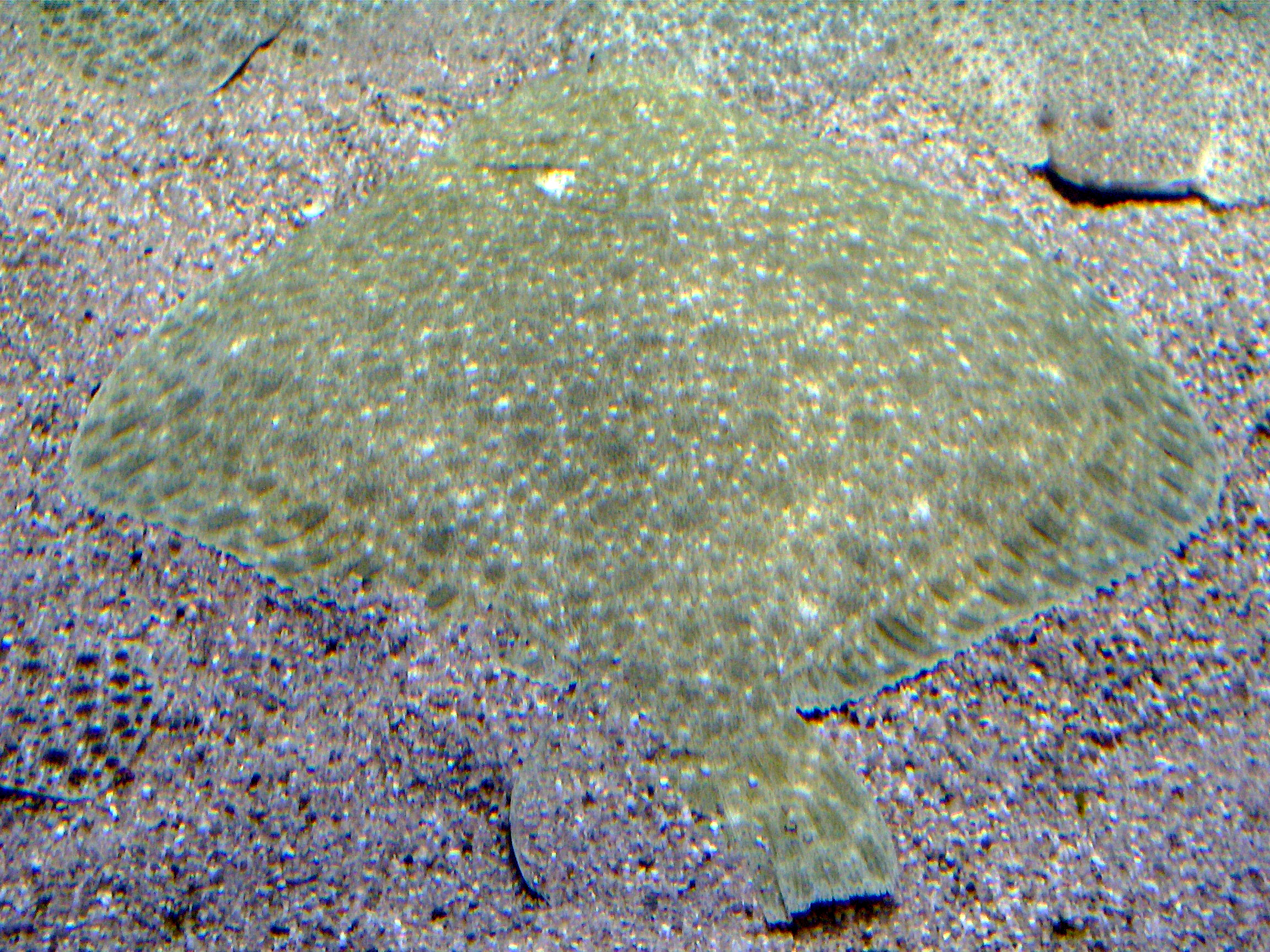
- Scophthalmus maximus

Scientific classification
- Kingdom: Animalia
- Phylum: Chordata
- Class: Actinopterygii
- Clade: Percomorpha
- Order: Carangiformes
- Suborder: Pleuronectoidei
- Family: Scophthalmidae; Chabanaud, 1933

Type genus
- Scophthalmus Rafinesque, 1810

Genera
- Lepidorhombus; Phrynorhombus; Scophthalmus; Zeugopterus †Oligoscophthalmus

= Scophthalmidae =

Scophthalmidae Temporal range: Early Oligocene–present

Family of fishes

The Scophthalmidae are a family of flatfish found in the North Atlantic Ocean, Baltic Sea, Mediterranean Sea, and Black Sea. Fish of this family are known commonly as turbots, though this name can refer specifically to Scophthalmus maximus, as well. Some common names found in species of this family are turbots, windowpanes, and brills.

Cladistic analysis reveals that this family is a monophyletic group.

Of all the scophthalmids, the largest species (Scophthalmus maximus) reaches approximately one meter in length. Some species in the family have been historically fished commercially (predominantly the brill flatfish and the turbot flatfish, S.rhombus and S. maximus respectively).

== Taxonomy ==
The Scophthalmidae family is composed of two main clades, four genera, and eight species. The four genera are Zeugopterus, Lepidorhombus, Phrynorhombus, and Scophthalmus, all sharing synapomorphies yet also subtle distinctions. One fossil genus, †Oligoscophthalmus Sakamoto, Uyeno & Micklich, 2003 is known from the Early Oligocene of Germany.

=== Discovery ===
The first known fossil was dated to the Cenozoic era during the Oligocene epoch. This specific fossil is believed to be from the upper Tertiary and is the oldest specimen of the family.

=== Taxonomic history ===
- 1900: The features of the family were first recorded and compared with other taxa. The relationship between scophthalmids and other flatfish became apparent.
- 1910: This distinction was then further specified when scophthalmids were paired with other left-eyed species of flatfish. This subfamily is called Bothidae, and are unique in comparison to other fish in their sinistral nature.
- 1934: Again, taking a step further the fish are now categorized into a subfamily of Bothidae, and are named Scophthalmidae. To make said distinction, various species of similar traits were combined, primarily from the Paralichthyidae and Bothidae families of flatfish. These traits can be localized to three main requirements: "i) anterior extension of the two pelvic fins; ii) eyes present on the left-side; iii) presence of vomerine teeth."
- 1993: After some confusion, it was concluded that the Scophthalmidae family is a sister clade to other subfamilies of flatfish (like the Paralichthyidae and the Bothidae) and need to be revisited. Chapleau, from The Interrelationships of Scophthalmid Fishes, redefined the subfamily's traits to two more distinct features: "(i) anterior extension of the two pelvic fins; (ii) an elongated supraoccipital process in contact with the dorsal margin of the blind side frontal." Again, these traits are also not perfect as defining a specific monophyly for any group is rather complex.
- 1998–1999: Both traits proposed in 1993 were confirmed synapomorphies of Scophthalmidae. In addition to these synapomorphies, a third was added, namely the "presence of asymmetrical transverse apophyses."
- 2003: The Interrelationships of Scophthalmid Fishes is released by Bruno Chanet, recognizing two main subfamilies of scophthalmids.

== Distribution and habitat ==
Turbots are benthic animals and can be found in both Marine and Brackish environments, but not in freshwater. While certain flatfish can be found in the other regions, Scophthalmidae are native to the North Atlantic, as well as the Baltic, Mediterranean, and Black seas. According to Fishes of the World and excluding one species located in the Western Atlantic, all other scophthalmids reside in the general Northeastern Atlantic region. However, mapping out a specific organism's changes in habitat over their lifespan would be rather complex. Environmental events can displace fish or incline them to leave their home ranges. All fishes, including scophthalmids, also face predation risks and prey scarcity, as well as the complexities of spawning behaviors. While true, movements of the species can be tracked for instances of displacement as well as seasonal cycles of migration–both of which "appear to be triggered by changes in water temperature, light, current velocity, and irregular episodic events."

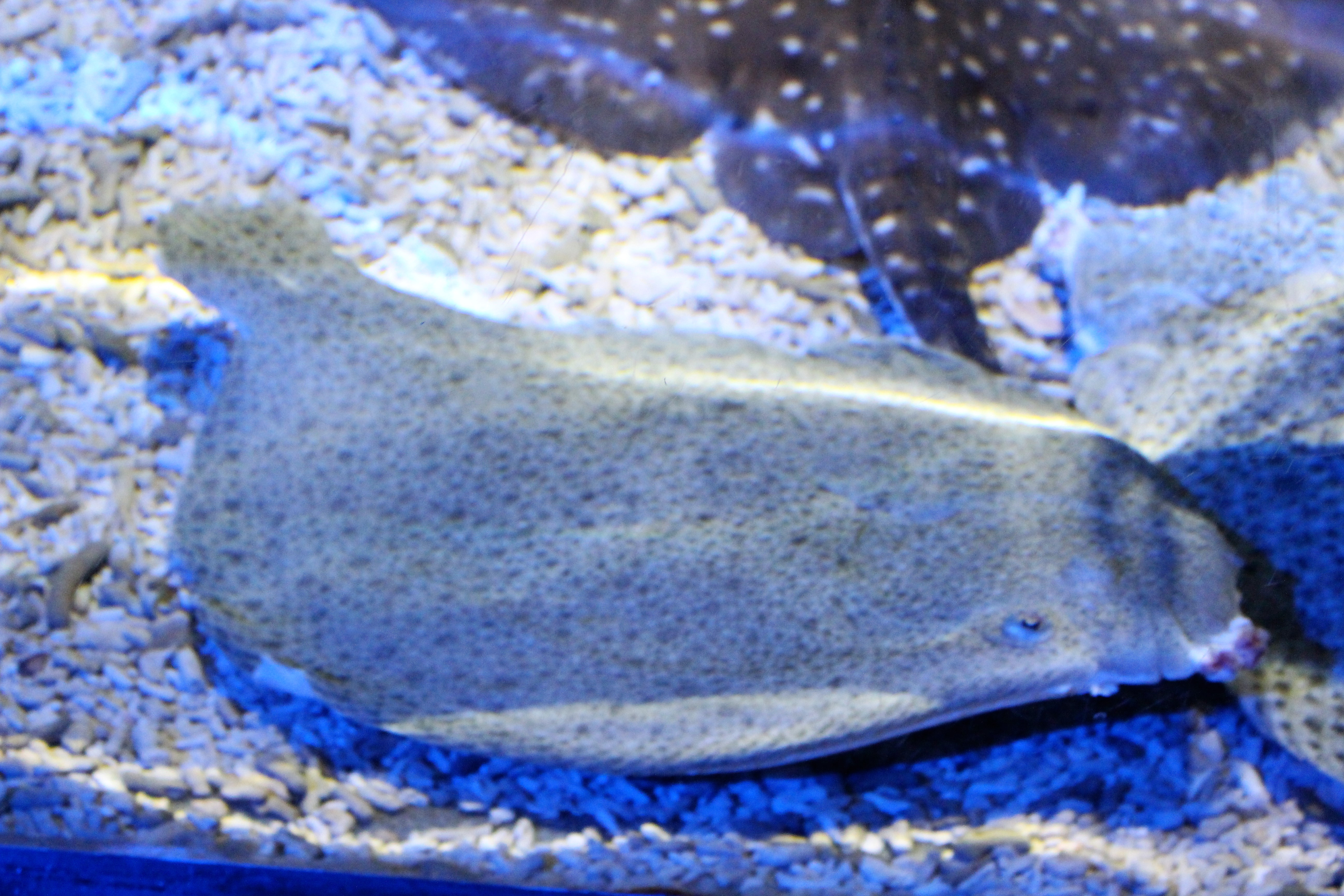
Scophthalmus maximus in front of a thornback ray (Raja clavata) at the Scarborough SEA LIFE Sanctuary in England.

The movement of water is crucial to the species as it is a primary form of transportation. All stages of the flatfish (from larval, juvenile, to adult) use the elliptic and cyclic nature of Earth's tides in locomotion. The rising tide carries individuals shoreward and during the ebb tide they can exit the water column and sink to the bottom. This is crucial to energy expenditure, especially in migratory events between feeding and spawning grounds that take place every year. During migrations tidal cycles are primary in determining the vertical displacement of flatfish in the water column, while on feeding and spawning grounds these behaviors are more influenced by the diel cycle. The location of turbots is cryptic and multivariable, consisting of a mixture of both these cycles, an internal "clock" mechanism, and other factors such as turbulence, hunger, and magnetic fields.

But with all said and done, the flatfish don't go too far. The anatomy of these organisms is intrinsically negatively buoyant, making them sink in the absence of currents and upwellings. To preserve energy, this is their natural state. They are rather sedentary and the fish spend most of their time on bottom substrates.

== Anatomy and morphology ==
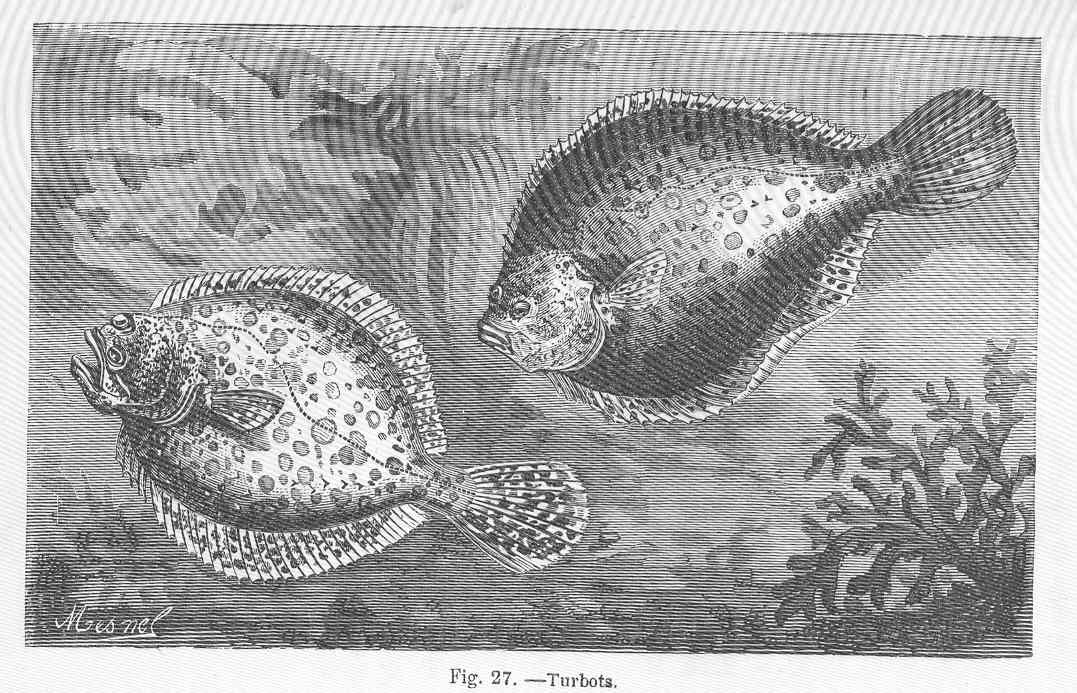
Turbots (Pictured)

Scophthalmidae is a family of ray-finned fish (Actinopterygii), so it exhibits any primitive traits of that clade. Being a scientific family, it also has its own set of general traits, as well as a variety of derived traits specific to the different genera of Scophthalmidae. These various features can be distinguished at every level of the scientific hierarchy to best emphasize the differences between the taxon. Being part of the Scophthalmidae family, all scophthalmids share the same fundamental Actinopterygii and pleuronectiformes traits.

=== Actinopterygii traits ===
Actinopterygii, or ray-finned fish, share traits will all prior marine vertebrates (i.e. a skeleton, paired fins, cycloid or ctenoid scales, covered gills, homocercal tails, protrusible jaws, etc...) The main requirements for the taxa are fin-rays (of which make up the fins and are responsible the name of the clade) and a swim bladder (a derived trait of this phylogenetic group). All genera of Scophthalmidae are Actinopterygii, and as such share this primary features.

=== Pleuronectiformes traits ===
Pleuronectiformes (flatfish) share a lot in common with some minor distinctions. Based on the name, it is right to assume that most genera of pleuronectiformes are 'flat' and have a generally 'low' body profile. Due to this anatomical difference, flatfish are quite unique and have asymmetrical features. In adult individuals, both eyes lye on the same side of the head on whichever side is dominant (Scophthalmidae are left-eyed flatfish). Furthermore, flatfish have protrusible eyes and have slowly translated their dorsal fin (over the course of evolutionary history) onto the head. Poking eyes out of the substrate and using this dorsal fin akin to a rudder, these three traits all serve the flatfish in its benthic lifestyle. Lastly, the generalized coloration of flatfish include a very pale underside with a cryptically pigmented dorsal side. This pigmentation serves as a camouflage for the fish and allows them to increase their survivorship via heightened predator avoidance and improved hunting behaviors.

=== Scophthalmidae traits ===
The three primary synapomorphies within the Scophthalmidae family (mentioned previously under Taxonomic History) have been crucial in defining the clade. Proposed in Interrelationships of Scophthalmid Fishes, the three aforementioned synapomorphies along with two other niche traits help differentiate scophthalmids from the other flatfish. These five anatomical traits are as follows:

(i) "The anterior extension of the two pelvic fins to the isthmus"

(ii) "Slightly asymmetric lateral expansions on both pelvic bones"

(iii) "An elongated anterior supraoccipital process (often crenulated) in contact with the dorsal margin of the right (blind-side) frontal"

(iv) "The presence of asymmetrical transverse apophyses on the caudal vertebrae"

(v) "The first neural spine bent at contact with the dorsal margin of the cranium"

Other non-defining traits of scophthalmids that are not specific to the family are their large and prominent lower jaws, sinistral eyes, and the single oil globule present in the yolks of their eggs.

== Behavior ==
=== Locomotion ===
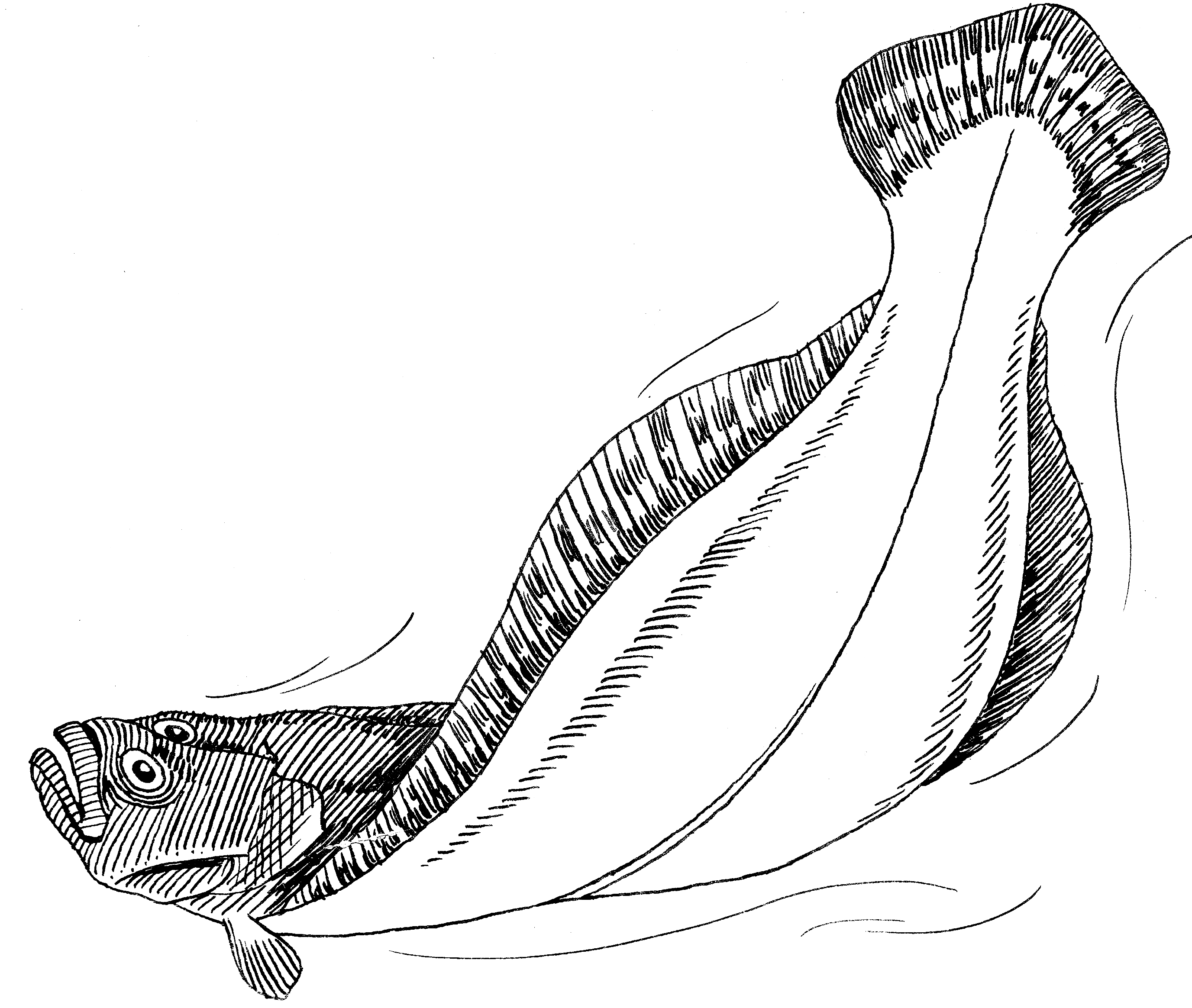
Flatfish (Pleuronectiforme) in locomotion.

Scophthalmids live a fairly sedentary lifestyle in comparison to other ray-finned fish, and due to their negative buoyancy spend most of their time below other taxa. Being asymmetrical and spending most of their time on the bottom substrates, scophthalmids have evolved unique locomotive systems to better fit their lifestyle. Turning their bodies into levers, the flatfish use forward and backward movements to propel themselves across the substrate. Oftentimes, these movements are short, with pauses in between strokes (akin to gliding). That being said, the fish can increase their movement speed through "rapid propulsive strokes" that can propel individuals in different directions.

In addition to the "rapid propulsive strokes," scophthalmids can elevate their heads into an alert position. Using both of these adaptations in tandem, the fishes can change the angle of their projection, and shoot themselves into the water column by lifting their heads and then executing a 'rapid propulsive stroke.' This is highly useful to escape predation, initiate gliding, or journey far distances while conserving energy (e.g. traveling between feeding and spawning sites). While the propulsive stroke may be energetically costly, once in the water column the flatfish can exhibit 'swim and glide' behaviors to cruise through the water.

Besides the lever-system that can propel the fish in the transverse plane, scophthalmids also have unique systems to control their vertical and horizontal movements. Due to their asymmetry, their bodies are on a 90 degree rotation and use their fins differently than most Actinopterygii. Flatfish can change their vertical direction by changing the angle of their bodies, with particular emphasis on the angle of their caudal fins. On the contrary, horizontal direction is controlled using the pectoral fin (akin to a rudder of a boat).

=== Burying behavior ===
Burying is crucial to the survivorship of Scophthalmidae as it is their primary defense in avoiding predators and hunting prey. By burying, the fishes avoid detection from predation risks, and also reduce environmental challenges like current shear. To initiate this important and unique behavior, flatfish vigorously beat their heads "against the sediment, accompanied by a wave of muscular [contractions] that [travel] with decreasing amplitude down the length of the body." This odd combination of muscle contractions complete two primary tasks:

(i) First, the head is driven into the substrate in the first half of the movement.

(ii) Second, the head movements "waft sediment from beneath the body so that it falls back onto the surface of the fish." In this latter have of the movement the fishes do not simply swim into the substrate, they actively displace the substrate so that it falls back on top of them and conceals them.

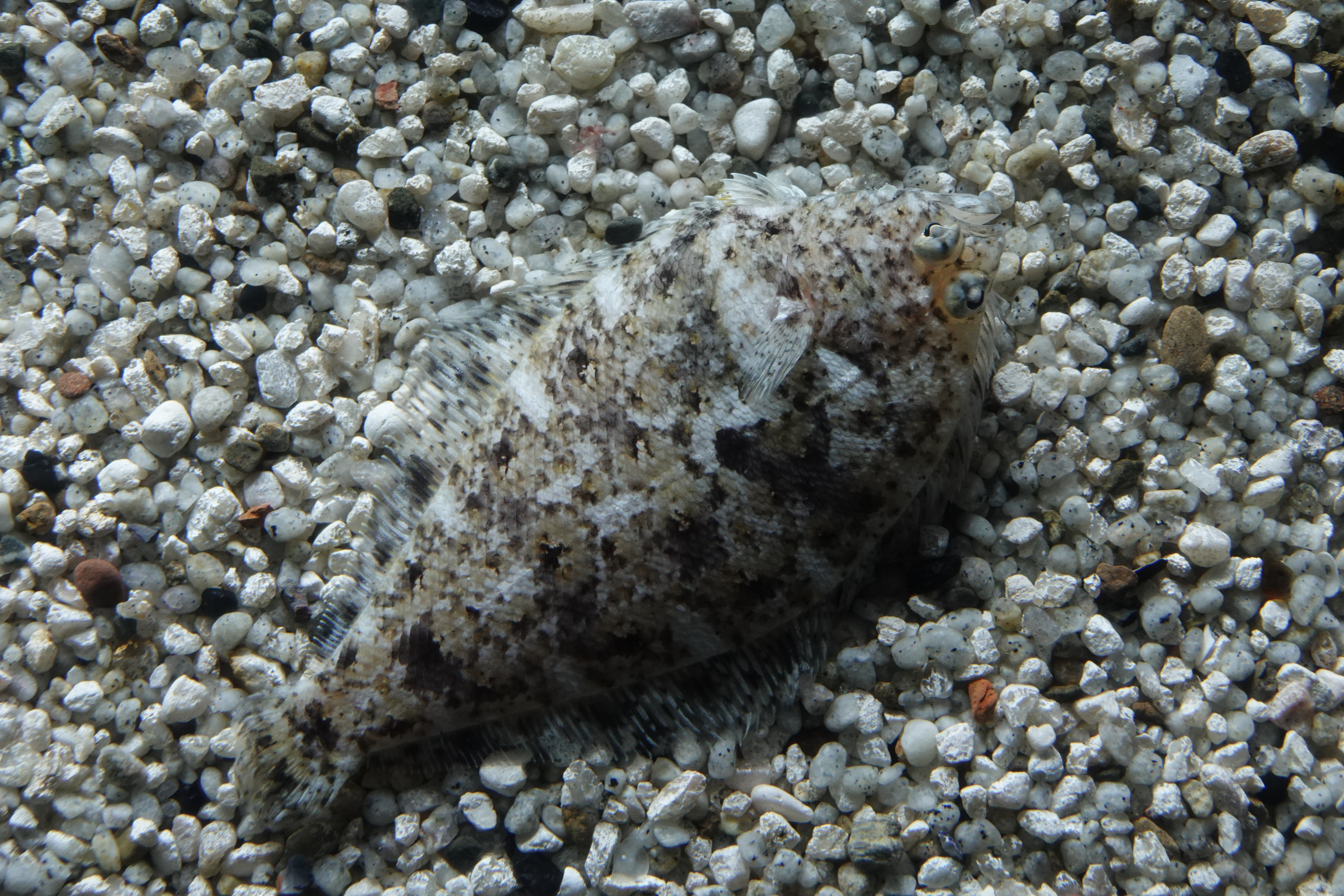
A flatfish (Peces planos) using cryptic camouflage. Monterey Bay Aquarium, Monterey, CA.

Location is crucial to these behaviors as some substrates are impenetrable to flatfish. This facet actively selects for specific substrates that the fish can bury in (e.g. sand), and dictate their home ranges. In The Behaviour of Flatfish, it is noted that this preference of substrate drifts towards sandy over coarse, as well as an avoidance of overly muddy substrates.The Behaviour of Flatfish does not explain as to why this is, but it could be speculated that the murkiness caused by burying in muddy substrates can be rather visible to predators, counteracting the primary function of this behavior. Time of day can also be important, as visibility decreases with access to light. Due to this factor, it is expected that burial behaviors are less common in scophthalmids at lower depths and during the night.

Lastly, burying behavior does not just limit predation detection via visual cues. Indeed, burial can reduce "conspicuousness," but flatfish can employ additional tools to solidify their defense. Scophthalmids are believed to be capable of lowering heart rates and well as decreasing oxygen consumption, in turn sending less involuntary cues of their presence and reduce the chemical signals sent to predators.

=== Feeding behavior ===
Feeding is crucial to any organisms behavior as it is necessary to sustain life. Unlike other organisms, however, temperature plays a significant role in determining feeding intensity and growth. While making Scophthalmidae more susceptible to climate change, this force also helps dictate population size and drives growth to be proportional to the various seasons. Being that Scophthalmidae is a family of flatfish very similar to other Pleuronectiformes, diet varies. Flatfish take advantage of complex environments while most fish have no choice but to hunt in open water. This gives the fishes relatively high plasticity in their feeding behaviors and they enlist a wide range of tactics. Visits to species pages will give higher insight onto the specific feeding-type of said species. By the same merit, below are the general feeding-types and elements of feeding behavior that exist within the order:

==== The three general feeding types ====
1. "Visual feeders that consume free-swimming prey"
2. "Visual feeders that take principally slow-moving and sedentary benthic prey"
3. "Non-visual nocturnal feeders that consume sedentary benthic prey"

All three feeding types involve the various elements of feeding behavior. Visual predation is the most common in flatfish, but the non-visual nocturnal species rely on chemical cues left in the water (e.g. distress signals, high heart rates, oxygen consumption, cortisol levels, olfactory chemicals, decomposition, etc.).

==== The four elements of feeding behavior ====
1. Searching: Searching tends to be initiated via hunger, but can also be induced via chemical signals in the water. Generally a slow process, they tend to swim upstream to track olfactory clues and primarily rely on vision during the hunt (they have extensive vision in all planes due to their protrusive eyes and cranial anatomy).
2. Encountering: The senses are used to take in both visual and chemical cues (which are important for marine species). Both of these factors have been proved to increase the attractiveness of prey items. In addition to those factors, flatfish have keen motion detection via "wide-set eyes" and a "lateral line system" on their head or body that can be stimulated by motion.
3. Capture: Capture consists of three sub-elements that can dictate the style of capture or 'type of hunt.'
  1. Pursuit: Pursuit is common in faster taxon as the individual uses sheer speed to run down free-swimming prey.
  2. Stalking: Stalking is a method different from ambushing. Taxon that use this style of capture lure outside of detection of the prey item, and their primary weapon is stealth and striking.
  3. Ambush: Ambush species use their unique adaptations and combine stillness, burying, or cryptic coloration until prey is in striking distance.
4. Ingestion: After capture, all that is left is ingestion, digestion, and defecation.

== Reproduction ==
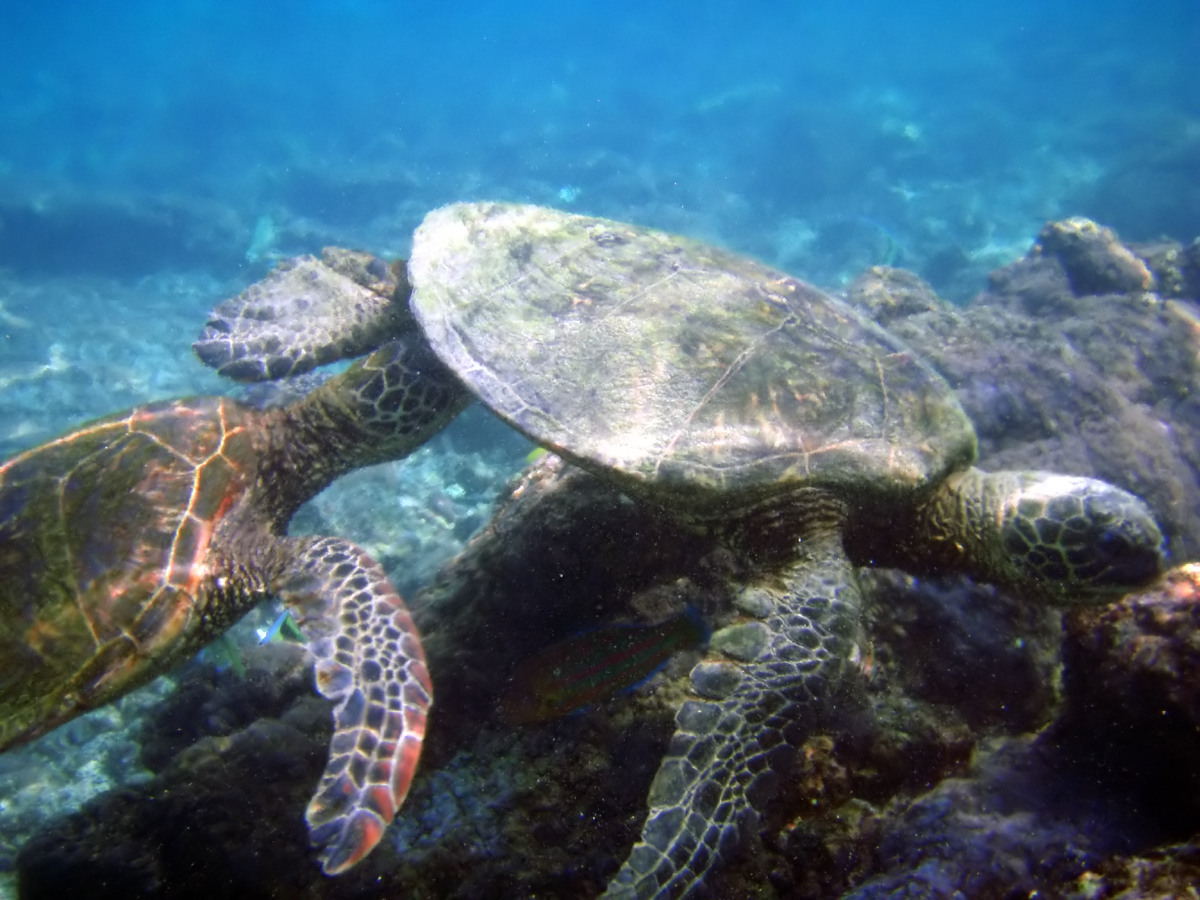
Similar stacking positioning in courtship behavior of green sea rurtles (Chelonia mydas)

=== Courtship ===
Little is known in regards to the reproduction of scophthalmids beyond what is widely accepted or generalized in the broader flatfish order. When a female enters a reproductive state (due to internal or external stimuli), courtship is usually initiated by the male. Male Pleuronectiformes follow the female individual across the sea floor, and then maneuvers either above or below the female depending on the species. If successfully courted, the female (now with the male) rise through the water column. The pair reaches the climax of the courtship ritual as they reach the "apex of the rise," where gametes are released into the water. Following this dispersal of gametes, the two return to the seafloor having successfully mated.

=== Life stages ===
Akin to courtship behaviors, scophthalmids also share a three-stage spawning behavior just like other flatfish. Spawning tends to take place in the evening, and males and females generally pair due to relative body size. One interesting fact about flatfish is that most species are actually born symmetrical, and their eyes rotate as they mature (can travel 10–25mm on average). As the fish develop, the non-dominant eye 'floats' to the dominant side over time, resulting in the intrinsic asymmetry of the order.

Female can indicate their "readiness to spawn by rapidly raising and lowering their heads." This in turn inclines males to approach and produce a threat signal, circling the female "flagging with the pectoral fin." Speculation as to why is not solidified in scientific literature but it is possibly due to competition in paternity.

== Conservation status and threats ==
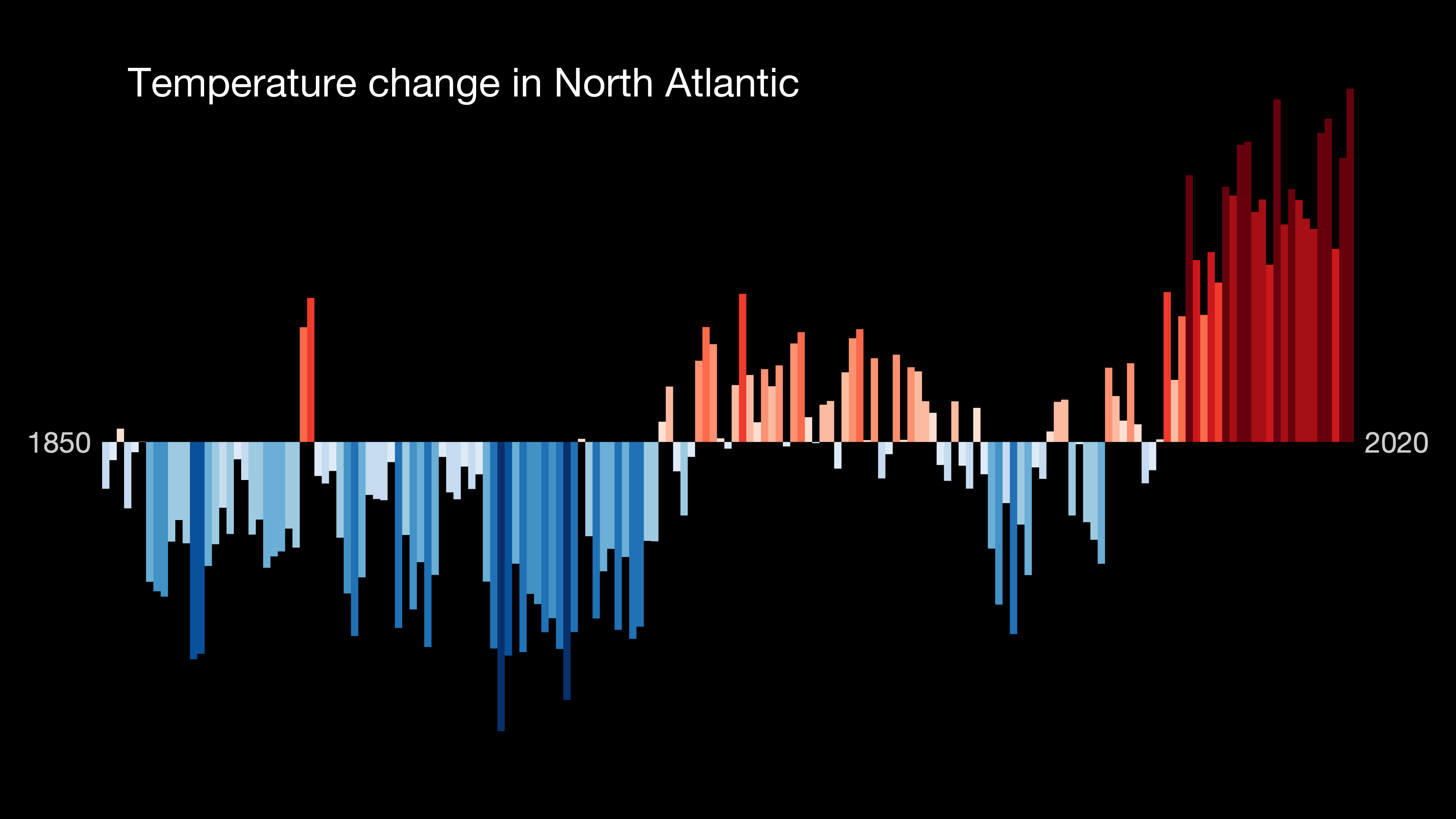
Visual representation of the Change in Temperature in the North Atlantic from 1850 to 2000. Each stripe represents the temperature averaged over a year.

=== Climate change ===
The Latitudinal Gradient is a common term in describing the change of a certain variable with respect to global latitudes. Due to the tilt of the Earth as well as the distance from the sun, this latitudinal gradient is often proportional to the global temperature gradient, both on water and land. The temperature gradient of the ocean is crucial for all marine life as some species are specialized for different regions or use temperature to direct migrations. Thus, species that reside in temperate latitudes tend to have broader preferences and tolerances then species specialized for extreme temperatures. This makes both tropical and polar species more susceptible to changes in climate. Flatfish are negatively affected by these temperature shifts and continue to decline in populations. Globally, their numbers dwindle and have been since the 1970s. The use of technology has allowed researchers to calculate numbers of existing populations as well as estimate the future of the clade. Two of these methods, a vulnerability assessment and simulation model projections, help pinpoint the regions at highest risk of this change and align with previously mentioned latitudinal gradient predictions. Findings suggest that the Indo-Pacific and Northeast Atlantic are at the highest risk of impacts due to climate change (i.e. a tropical region and polar region). As mentioned previously, scophthalmids are almost exclusively located in the Northeast Atlantic and will suffer heavily from this. Interestingly enough, the rapid warming was exacerbated regionally due to factors such as human populations, freshwater prevalence, and land-locking. The highest levels of warming ("LMEs warming at rates 2–4 times the global mean rate") was confined to certain areas, especially in the North Atlantic. Regions that Scophthalmidae are native to (i.e. the Baltic, Mediterranean, and Black seas) all fall under this hotspot. It seems that this regional increase of warming can be traced to the "natural variability related to the North Atlantic Oscillation" as well as adjacent terrestrial warming near the coastal seas (caused by industrial/anthropogenic advancements).

In addition to this fact, the increasingly negative population dynamics of all flatfish indicates that the clade has reached its maximum potential. Furthermore, some fisheries have overfished certain regions to the point of collapse. In these regions a bounce-back in population is not expected. This change is not just due to temperature change, but additional factors tied to climate change (i.e. ocean acidification, oxygen depletion, and decreases in net primary production). Climate change is a multivariate problem for scophthalmids as it has led to changes in distribution and net productivity in addition to the aforementioned decreases in population. Yet, these changes in distribution are not exclusive to potentially obvious latitudinal range shifts. The flatfish have also been observed migrating within regions, shifting their depth as well. Averaging to only several meters per decade, this seemingly small change is drastic for the family. While decreasing depth can help scophthalmids fight the change in ocean temperature, the deeper they travel the less light can penetrate and both conditions and productivity also decrease. This is a negative constraint on the fish which will eventually reach its limit.

Lastly, scophthalmids are simply less mobile than other taxa. Their activity rate is much lower than other fish of similar size and location (alternate pelagic and demersal species). Because of this, it is harder to migrate, maneuver, and adapt, making their adjustment period relatively slow. All finfish (including scophthalmids), however, are expected to shrink. The decrease in body size relates to the temperature change via oxygen levels. The growing restriction on oxygen levels proportional to the increase in temperature negatively affects body size, adding yet another side effect to the changing climate.

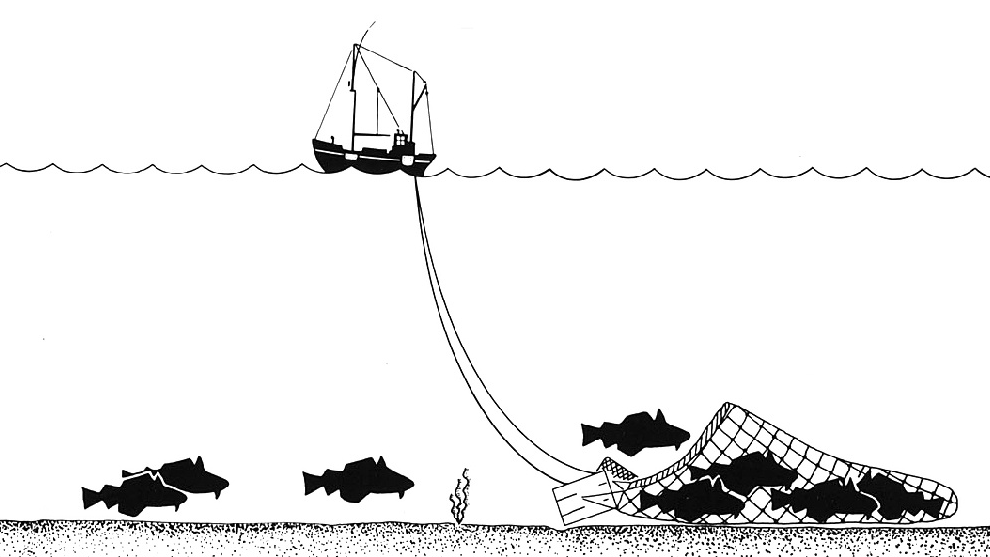
Trawl Fishing Depiction

=== Trawl fishing ===
Put plainly, trawl fishing is when nets are dragged through the water to catch as many fish as possible. Bottom trawling (primarily industrially committed) is when this method is used on the seafloor where the nets are weighted and dragged. Frowned upon by marine biologists, bottom trawling is harmful to the ecosystem due to the displacement of sediment and organisms as well as the irreversible damage it creates. In addition to negatively affecting the ecosystem, bottom trawling proves to be highly dangerous to scophthalmids as well as other families of flatfish. This method of fishing exploits scophthalmids’ natural predator avoidance behaviors. Flatfish find comfort with the substrate, and use detection minimization techniques as their primary avoidance behavior. These strategies combine various techniques such as "burial, highly evolved cryptic capabilities, and low activity," all of which are useless and therefore detrimental in fighting trawls.

The first indication of a trawling vessel is the sound vibrations sent through the water. This stimulus is received by the fish ("which have good hearing in the range of 300–1000 Hz") and the scophthalmids then respond by diving. Because of this, while flatfish do not school or directly herd as an avoidance behavior, individuals indirectly herd in the regard by which they are all migrating in the same direction. This increase in concentration is dangerous as it increases catch per trawl, oftentimes when the flatfish are not even the desired target (bycatch).

Highly specialized behaviors are hard to change, making the flatfishes' natural instinct to minimize detection rendered useless. Usually they can be rather cryptic, and have great success avoiding natural predators. Utilizing their low body profile and texture-matching colorations, they become hard to detect. Furthering their camouflage, they have behavioral modifications that work in tandem to their anatomy. Scophthalmidae share a strong inclination to bury themselves and to cease movement, fighting the desire to flee until extremely close to detection. In addition to being inclined to hiding, in the instance they are being caught, flatfish face the disadvantage of their maximum swim speed. Only able to sustain a certain speed at relatively lower rates than most roundfish, flatfish tend to respond to the trawls in short bursts and generally remain unresponsive until "approx. <1 meter away." After observing the adaptations Scophthalmidae have made to survive in the Ocean, bottom trawling proves to be a major industrial threat to scophthalmids because of its own nature in specifically targeting and taking advantage of flatfish behavior.
