= List of fishes of Great Britain =

This is a list of fish found in and around Great Britain, in both fresh water (lakes, rivers, streams and man-made pools) and salt water. This list includes species that are native to Great Britain, as well as those which have been introduced from other countries.

== Agnatha - jawless fish ==
=== Myxini - hagfish ===
==== Myxinidae - hagfish ====
- Atlantic hagfish, Myxine glutinosa
- White-headed hagfish, Myxine ios

=== Petromyzontiformes - lampreys ===
==== Petromyzontidae - northern lampreys ====
- River lamprey, Lampetra fluviatilis
- Brook lamprey, Lampetra planeri
- Sea lamprey, Petromyzon marinus

== Chondrichthyes - cartilaginous fish ==
=== Chimaeriformes - ratfish ===
==== Chimaeridae - short-nosed chimaeras ====
- Ratfish, Chimaera monstrosa
- Opal chimaera, Chimaera opalescens
- Smalleyed rabbitfish, Hydrolagus affinis
- Large-eyed rabbitfish, Hydrolagus mirabilis

==== Rhinochimaeridae - long-nosed chimaeras ====
- Narrownose chimaera, Harriotta raleighana
- Broadnose chimaera, Rhinochimaera atlantica

=== Hexanchiformes - cow sharks and frilled sharks ===
==== Chlamydoselachidae - frilled sharks ====
- Frilled shark, Chlamydoselachus anguineus

==== Hexanchidae - cow sharks ====
- Sharpnose sevengill shark, Heptranchias perlo
- Bluntnose sixgill shark, Hexanchus griseus

=== Squaliformes - dogfish sharks ===
==== Squalidae - true dogfish ====
- Spurdog, Squalus acanthias

==== Echinorhinidae - bramble sharks ====
- Bramble shark, Echinorhinus brucus

==== Dalatiidae - kitefin sharks ====
- Kitefin shark, Dalatias licha

==== Centrophoridae - gulper sharks ====
- Leafscale gulper shark, Centrophorus squamosus
- Birdbeak dogfish, Deania calcia

==== Etmopteridae - lantern sharks ====
- Black dogfish, Centroscyllium fabricii
- Great lanternshark, Etmopterus princeps
- Velvet belly lanternshark, Etmopterus spinax

==== Oxynotidae - rough sharks ====
- Angular roughshark, Oxynotus centrina
- Sailfin roughshark, Oxynotus paradoxus

==== Somniosidae - sleeper sharks ====
- Portuguese dogfish, Centroscymnus coelolepis
- Longnose velvet dogfish, Centroselachus crepidater
- Smallmouth velvet dogfish, Scymnodon obscurus
- Knifetooth dogfish, Scymnodon ringens
- Greenland shark, Somniosus microcephalus
- Velvet dogfish, Zameus squamulosus

=== Lamniformes - mackerel sharks ===
==== Cetorhinidae - basking sharks ====
- Basking shark, Cetorhinus maximus

==== Lamnidae - mackerel sharks ====
- Great white shark, Carcharodon carcharias
- Shortfin mako shark, Isurus oxyrinchus
- Porbeagle, Lamna nasus

==== Alopiidae - thresher sharks ====
- Thresher shark, Alopias vulpinus

=== Carchariniformes - ground sharks ===
==== Scyliorhinidae - catsharks ====
- Iceland catshark, Apristurus laurussonii
- Ghost catshark, Apristurus manis
- Black roughscale catshark, Apristurus melanoasper
- Blackmouth catshark, Galeus melastomus
- Lesser spotted dogfish, Scyliorhinus canicula
- Greater spotted dogfish, Scyliorhinus stellaris

==== Carcharhinidae - requiem sharks ====
- Copper shark, Carcharinus brachyurus
- Blue shark, Prionace glauca

==== Pseudotriakidae - false catsharks ====
- False catshark, Pseudotriakis microdon

==== Sphyrnidae - hammerheads ====
- Smooth hammerhead, Sphyrna zygaena

==== Triakidae - houndsharks ====
- Tope, Galeorhinus galeus
- Starry smooth-hound, Mustelus asterias
- Common smooth-hound, Mustelus mustelus

=== Squatiniformes - angel sharks ===
==== Squatinidae - angel sharks ====
- Angel shark, Squatina squatina

=== Rajiformes - skates and rays ===
==== Rajidae - skates ====
- Arctic skate, Amblyraja hyperborea
- Thorny skate, Amblyraja radiata
- Spinetail ray, Bathyraja spinicauda
- Blue skate, Dipturus batis
- Flapper skate, Dipturus intermedius
- Norwegian skate, Dipturus nidarosiensis
- Long-nosed skate, Dipturus oxyrinchus
- Sandy ray, Leucoraja circularis
- Shagreen ray, Leucoraja fullonica
- Cuckoo ray, Leucoraja naevus
- Blue ray, Neoraja caerulea
- Blonde ray, Raja brachyura
- Thornback ray, Raja clavata
- Smalleyed ray, Raja microocellata
- Spotted ray, Raja montagui
- Undulate ray/painted ray, Raja undulata
- Deepwater ray, Rajella bathyphila
- Bigelow's ray, Rajella bigelowi
- Round ray, Rajella fyllae
- Sailray, Rajella lintea
- Bottlenose skate, Rostroraja alba

=== Myliobatiformes - stingrays ===
==== Dasyatidae - whiptail stingrays ====
- Common stingray, Dasyatis pastinaca
- Pelagic stingray, Pteroplatytrygon violacea

==== Myliobatidae - eagle rays ====
- Devil fish, Mobula mobular
- Common eagle ray, Myliobatis aquila

=== Torpediniformes - electric rays ===
==== Torpedinidae - torpedo rays ====
- Marbled electric ray, Torpedo marmorata
- Atlantic torpedo, Torpedo nobiliana

== Osteichthyes - bony fish ==
=== Acipenseriformes - sturgeon ===
==== Acipenseridae - sturgeon ====
- Atlantic sturgeon, Acipenser oxyrinchus (extinct in British waters)
- European sea sturgeon, Acipenser sturio

=== Anguilliformes - true eels ===
==== Anguillidae - freshwater eels ====
- European eel, Anguilla anguilla

==== Muraenidae - morays ====
- Mediterranean moray, Muraena helena

==== Congridae - congers ====
- Conger eel, Conger conger

==== Nettastomatidae - witch eels ====
- Whipsnout sorcerer, Venefica proboscidea

==== Nemichthyidae - snipe eels ====
- Avocet snipe eel, Avocettina infans
- Slender snipe eel, Nemichthys scolopaceus

==== Synaphobranchidae - cutthroat eels ====
- Deepwater arrowtooth eel, Histiobranchus bathybius
- Robins's cutthroat eel, Ilyophis arx
- Saldanha's cutthroat eel, Ilyophis blachei
- Muddy arrowtooth eel, Ilyophis brunneus
- Kaup's arrowtooth eel, Synaphobranchus kaupii

=== Notacanthiformes - spiny eels ===
==== Halosauridae - halosaurs ====
- Abyssal halosaur, Halosauropsis macrochir
- Johnson's halosaur, Halosaurus johnsonianus

==== Notacanthidae - spiny eels ====
- Shortfin spiny eel, Notacanthus bonaparte
- Spiny eel, Notacanthus chemnitzii
- Longnose tapirfish, Polyacanthonotus challengeri
- Smallmouth spiny eel, Polyacanthonotus rissoanus

=== Saccopharyngiformes - gulper eels ===
==== Saccopharyngidae - gulper eels ====
- Gulper eel, Saccopharynx ampullaceus

==== Eurypharyngidae - pelican eels ====
- Pelican eel, Eurypharynx pelecanoides

=== Clupeiformes - herring ===
==== Clupeidae - true herrings ====
- Allis shad, Alosa alosa
- Twaite shad, Alosa fallax
- Atlantic herring, Clupea harengus
- European pilchard, Sardina pilchardus
- Sprat, Sprattus sprattus

==== Engraulidae - anchovies ====
- European anchovy, Engraulis encrasicolus

=== Cypriniformes - carp and allies ===
==== Cyprinidae - carp, minnows and barbs ====
- Common bream/bronze bream/skimmer bream, Abramis brama
- Bleak, Alburnus alburnus
- Asp, Aspius aspius (introduced)
- Barbel, Barbus barbus
- Silver bream, Blicca bjoerkna
- Goldfish, Carassius auratus (introduced)
- Crucian carp, Carassius carassius / Carassius cuvieri
- Grass carp, Ctenopharygodon idella (introduced)
- Common carp/mirror carp/leather carp/koi, Cyprinus carpio (introduced)
- Gudgeon, Gobio gobio
- Silver carp, Hypophthalmichthys molitrix (introduced)
- Bighead carp, Hypophthalmichthys nobilis (introduced)
- Sunbleak, Leucaspius delineatus (introduced)
- Orfe, Leuciscus idus (introduced)
- Common dace, Leuciscus leuciscus
- Eurasian minnow, Phoxinus phoxinus
- Fathead minnow, Pimephales promelas (introduced)
- Topmouth gudgeon, Pseudorasbora parva (introduced)
- European bitterling, Rhodeus amarus (introduced)
- Amur bitterling, Rhodeus sericeus (introduced)
- Roach, Rutilus rutilus
- Common rudd, Scardinius erythrophthalmus
- Chub, Squalius cephalus
- Tench, Tinca tinca

==== Catostomidae - suckers ====
- White sucker, Catostomus commersonii (introduced)

==== Cobitidae - true loaches ====
- Spined loach, Cobitis taenia
- European weatherfish, Misgurnus fossilis (introduced)

==== Nemacheilidae - stone loaches ====
- Stone loach, Nemacheilus barbatulus

=== Siluriformes - catfish ===
==== Siluridae - Eurasian catfish ====
- Wels catfish, Silurus glanis (introduced)

==== Ictaluridae - bullhead catfish ====
- Black bullhead, Ameiurus melas (introduced)
- Brown bullhead, Ameiurus nebulosus (introduced)
- Channel catfish, Ictalurus punctatus (introduced)

==== Loricariidae - armoured catfish ====
- Suckermouth catfish, Hypostomus plecostomus (introduced)

=== Esociformes - pike ===
==== Esocidae - pike ====
- Northern pike, Esox lucius

=== Osmeriformes - smelt ===
==== Osmeridae - smelt ====
- Capelin, Mallotus villosus
- European smelt, Osmerus eperlanus

=== Argentiniformes - argentines and slickheads ===
==== Alepocephalidae - slickheads ====
- Baird's slickhead, Alepocephalus bairdii
- Risso's smooth-head, Alepocephalus rostratus
- Longfin smooth-head, Conocara macropterum
- Elongate smooth-head, Conocara microlepis
- Murray's smooth-head, Conocara murrayi
- Salmon smooth-head, Conocara salmoneum
- Blackhead salmon, Narcetes stomias
- Abyssal smooth-head, Rinoctes nasutus
- Softskin smooth-head, Rouleina attrita
- Madeiran smooth-head, Rouleina maderensis
- Bluntsnout smooth-head, Xenodermichthys copei

==== Leptochilichthyidae - longjaw smooth-heads ====
- Agassiz' smooth-head, Leptochilichthys agassizii

==== Platytroctidae - tubeshoulders ====
- Bighead searsid, Holtbyrnia anomala
- Maul's searsid, Maulisia mauli
- Multipore searsid, Normichthys operosus
- Schnakenbeck's searsid, Sagamichthys schnakenbecki
- Koefoed's searsid, Searsia koefoedi

==== Argentinidae - argentines ====
- Greater argentine, Argentina silus
- Common argentine, Argentina sphyracna

==== Microstomatidae - pencil smelts ====
- Slender argentine, Microstoma microstoma
- Greenland argentine, Nansenia groenlandica
- Mediterranean large-eyed argentine, Nansenia oblita

==== Bathylagidae - deep-sea smelt ====
- Goiter blacksmelt, Bathylagus euryops

==== Opisthoproctidae - barrel-eyes ====
- Spookfish, Dolichopteryx rostrata
- Barrel-eye, Opisthoproctus soleatus

=== Salmoniformes - salmon and trout ===
==== Salmonidae - salmon and trout ====
- European cisco, Coregonus albula
- Arctic cisco, Coregonus autumnalis
- Lake whitefish, Coregonus clupeaformis (introduced)
- Powan, Coregonus clupeioides
- European whitefish, Coregonus lavaretus
- Houting, Coregonus oxyrinchus (extinct in Britain)
- Gwyniad, Coregonus pennantii
- Pollan, Coregonus pollan
- Schelly, Coregonus stigmaticus
- Vendace, Coregonus vandesius
- Huchen, Hucho hucho (introduced)
- Pink salmon, Oncorhynchus gorbuscha (introduced)
- Silverbrite salmon, Oncorhynchus keta (introduced)
- Coho salmon, Oncorhynchus kisutch (introduced)
- Cherry salmon (yamame-trout), Oncorhynchus masou (introduced)
- Rainbow trout, Oncorhynchus mykiss (introduced)
- Chinook salmon, Oncorhynchus tshawytscha (introduced)
- Ferox trout, Salmo ferox
- Sonaghan, Salmo nigripinnis
- Atlantic salmon, Salmo salar
- Gillaroo, Salmo stomachicus
- Brown trout/sea trout/Dollaghan, Salmo trutta
- Arctic charr, Salvelinus alpinus
- Brook trout, Salvelinus fontinalis (introduced)
- Shetland charr, Salvelinus gracillimus
- Loch Melvin charr, Salvelinus grayi
- Orkney charr, Salvelinus inframundus
- Haddy charr, Salvelinus killinensis
- Haweswater charr, Salvelinus lonsdalii
- Loch Shin charr, Salvelinus mallochi
- North Minch charr, Salvelinus maxillaris
- Lake trout, Salvelinus namaycush (introduced)
- Lough Leane charr, Salvelinus obtusus
- Llyn Peris charr, Salvelinus perisii
- Rannoch charr, Salvelinus struanensis
- Windermere charr, Salvelinus willughbii
- Golden charr, Salvelinus youngeri
- Grayling, Thymallus thymallus

=== Stomiiformes - dragonfish and marine hatchetfish ===
==== Sternoptychidae - marine hatchetfishes ====
- Half-naked hatchetfish, Argyropelacus hemigymnus
- Atlantic hatchetfish, Argyropelacus olfersi
- Mueller's pearlside, Maurolicus muelleri
- Diaphanous hatchet fish, Sternoptyx diaphana
- Constellationfish, Valenciennellus tripunctulatus

==== Gonostomatidae - bristlemouths ====
- Longray fangjaw, Bonapartia pedaliota
- Bristlemouth, Cyclothone alba
- Veiled anglemouth, Cyclothone microdon
- Elongated bristlemouth fish, Gonostoma elongatum
- Spark anglemouth, Sigmops bathyphilus

==== Stomiidae - dragonfish ====
- Large-eye snaggletooth, Borostomias antarcticus
- Long-barbeled dragonfish, Grammatostomias flagellibarba
- Barbeled scaleless dragonfish, Leptostomias gladiator
- Boa dragonfish, Stomias boa
- Threelight dragonfish, Trigonolampa miriceps

==== Phosichthyidae - lightfish ====
- Rendezvous fish, Polymetme corythaeola
- Parin's lightfish, Polymetme thaeocoryla

=== Aulopiformes - grinners ===
==== Paralepididae - barracudinas ====
- Spotted barracudina, Arctozenus risso
- Duckbill barracudina, Magnisudis atlantica
- Sharpchin barracudina, Paralepis coregonoides
- Pike-smelt, Sudis hyalina

==== Notosudidae - waryfish ====
- Blackfin waryfish, Scopelosaurus lepidus

==== Alepisauridae - lancetfish ====
- Long-snouted lancetfish, Alepisaurus ferox

==== Bathysauridae - deep sea lizardfish ====
- Deepsea lizardfish, Bathysaurus ferox

=== Myctophiformes - lanternfish ===
==== Myctophidae - lanternfish ====
- Glacier lanternfish, Benthosema glaciale
- Spothead lantern fish, Diaphus metopoclampus
- White-spotted lantern fish, Diaphus rafinesquii
- Chubby flashlightfish, Electrona risso
- Jewel lanternfish, Lampanyctus crocodilus
- Diamondcheek lanternfish, Lampanyctus intricarius
- Rakery beaconlamp, Lampanyctus macdonaldi
- Pygmy lanternfish, Lampanyctus pusillus
- Cocco's lantern fish, Lobianchia gemellarii
- Spotted lanternfish, Myctophum punctatum
- Topside lampfish, Notolychnus valdiviae
- Lancet fish, Notoscopelus kroyeri
- Arctic telescope, Protomyctophum arcticum
- Large scale lantern fish, Symbolophorus veranyi

=== Lampriformes - opahs and allies ===
==== Lampridae - opahs ====
- Opah, Lampris guttatus

==== Regalecidae - oarfish ====
- Oarfish, Regalecus glesne

==== Trachipteridae - ribbonfish ====
- Dealfish, Trachipterus arcticus

=== Gadiformes - cod ===
==== Lotidae - lings ====
- Cusk, Brosme brosme
- Fivebeard rockling, Ciliata mustela
- Northern rockling, Ciliata septentrionalis
- Four-bearded rockling, Enchelyopus cimbrius
- Arctic rockling, Gaidropsarus argentatus
- Bigeye rockling, Gaidropsarus macrophthalmus
- Shore rockling, Gaidropsarus mediterraneus
- Three-bearded rockling, Gaidropsarus vulgaris
- Burbot, Lota lota
- Blue ling, Molva dypterygia
- Spanish ling, Molva macrophthalma
- Common ling, Molva molva

==== Gadidae - codfishes ====
- Silvery pout, Gadiculus argenteus
- Thor's pout, Gadiculus thori
- Atlantic cod, Gadus morhua
- Greenland cod, Gadus ogac
- Haddock, Melanogrammus aeglefinus
- Whiting, Merlangius merlangus
- Blue whiting, Micromesistius poutassou
- Pollock, Pollachius pollachus
- Saithe, Pollachius virens
- Tadpole fish, Raniceps raninus
- Norway pout, Trisopterus esmarcki
- Pouting, Trisopterus luscus
- Poor cod, Trisopterus minutus

==== Merlucciidae - hakes ====
- Byrne's hake, Lyconus brachycolus
- European hake, Merluccius merluccius

==== Phycidae - forkbeards ====
- Greater forkbeard, Phycis blennoides
- Common forkbeard, Phycis phycis
- Red hake, Urophycis chuss

==== Macrouridae - grenadiers ====
- Hollowsnout grenadier, Coelorinchus caelorhincus
- Spearsnouted grenadier, Coelorinchus labiatus
- Abyssal grenadier, Coryphaenoides armatus
- Short-bearded grenadier, Coryphaenoides brevibarbis
- Carapine grenadier, Coryphaenoides carapinus
- Günther's grenadier, Coryphaenoides guentheri
- Ghostly grenadier, Coryphaenoides leptolepis
- Mediterranean grenadier, Coryphaenoides mediterraneus
- Deepwater grenadier, Coryphaenoides profundicolus
- Rock grenadier, Coryphaenoides rupestris
- Glasshead grenadier, Hymenocephalus italicus
- Onion-eye grenadier, Macrourus berglax
- Softhead grenadier, Malacocephalus laevis
- Common Atlantic grenadier, Nezumia aequalis
- Whiptail grenadier, Pseudonezumia flagellicauda
- Roughnose grenadier, Trachyrincus murrayi
- Roughsnout grenadier, Trachyrincus scabrus

==== Moridae - codlings ====
- Byrne's codling, Guttigadus latifrons
- Slender codling, Halargyreus johnsonii
- North Atlantic codling, Lepidion eques
- Common mora, Mora moro

=== Lophiiformes - anglerfish ===
==== Lophiidae - goosefish ====
- Blackbellied angler, Lophius budegassa
- Monkfish, Lophius piscatorius

==== Ceratiidae - sea devils ====
- Kroyer's deep-sea anglerfish, Ceratias holboelli

==== Himantolophidae - footballfish ====
- Atlantic footballfish, Himantolophus groenlandicus

==== Oneirodidae - dreamers ====
- Can-opener smoothdream, Chaenophryne longiceps
- Oneirodes carlsbergi
- Bulbous dreamer, Oneirodes eschrichtii

=== Batrachoidiformes - toadfish ===
==== Batrachoididae - toadfish ====
- Lusitanian toadfish, Halobatrachus didactylus

=== Ophidiiformes - pearlfish and cuskeels ===
==== Carapidae - pearlfish ====
- Pearlfish, Echiodon drummondii

==== Aphyonidae - blind cuskeels ====
- Blind cusk eel, Sciadonus galatheae

==== Ophidiidae - cuskeels ====
- Barbeled snake blenny, Ophidion barbatum
- Pudgy cuskeel, Spectrunculus grandis

==== Bythitidae - brotulas ====
- Allen's brotula, Cataetyx alleni
- Koefoed's brotula, Cataetyx laticeps
- Viviparous brotula, Thalassobathia pelagica

=== Mugiliformes - mullet ===
==== Mugilidae - mullet ====
- Thicklip grey mullet, Chelon labrosus
- Golden grey mullet, Liza aurata
- Thinlip mullet, Liza ramada
- Flathead grey mullet, Mugil cephalus

=== Atheriniformes - sand smelts ===
==== Atherinidae - sand smelts ====
- Big-scale sand smelt, Atherina boyeri
- Sand smelt, Atherina presbyter

=== Beloniformes - garfish and allies ===
==== Belonidae - garfish ====
- Garfish, Belone belone
- Short-beaked garfish, Belone svetovidovi

==== Scomberesocidae - sauries ====
- Atlantic saury, Scomberesox saurus

==== Exocoetidae - flyingfish ====
- Mediterranean flyingfish, Cheilopogon heterurus
- Black wing flyingfish, Hirundichthys rondeletii

=== Zeiformes - dories ===
==== Zeidae - true dories ====
- John Dory, Zeus faber

==== Oreosomatidae - oreos ====
- False boarfish, Neocyttus helgae

=== Cyprinodontiformes - toothcarps ===
==== Poeciliidae - live-bearers ====
- Guppy, Poecilia reticulata (introduced)

=== Beryciformes - alfonsinos and allies ===
==== Berycidae - alfonsinos ====
- Alfonsino, Beryx decadactylus

==== Diretmidae - spinyfins ====
- Silver spinyfin, Diretmus argenteus

==== Trachichthyidae - slimeheads ====
- Orange roughy, Hoplostethus atlanticus
- Silver roughy, Hoplostethus mediterraneus

==== Melamphaidae - ridgeheads ====
- Crested bigscale, Poromitra crassiceps
- Black headed bigscale, Poromitra nigriceps
- Bean's bigscale, Scopelogadus beanii

==== Anoplogastridae - fangtooths ====
- Fangtooth, Anoplogaster cornuta

=== Gasterosteiformes - sticklebacks and seahorses ===
==== Centriscidae - snipefish ====
- Longspine snipefish, Macroramphosus scolopax

==== Fistulariidae - cornetfish ====
- Red cornetfish, Fistularia petimba

==== Syngnathidae - pipefish and seahorses ====
- Snake pipefish, Entelurus aequoreus
- Long-snouted seahorse, Hippocampus guttulatus
- Short-snouted seahorse, Hippocampus hippocampus
- Common seahorse, Hippocampus ramulosus
- Worm pipefish, Nerophis lumbriciformis
- Straightnose pipefish, Nerophis ophidion
- Greater pipefish, Syngathus acus
- Lesser pipefish, Syngnathus rostellatus
- Broadnosed pipefish, Syngnathus typhle

==== Gasterosteidae - sticklebacks ====
- Three-spined stickleback, Gasterosteus aculeatus aculeatus
- Smoothtail nine-spined stickleback, Pungitius laevis
- Nine-spined stickleback, Pungitius pungitius
- Fifteen-spined stickleback, Spinachia spinachia

=== Tetraodontiformes - ocean sunfish and allies ===
==== Molidae - ocean sunfish ====
- Ocean sunfish, Mola mola
- Slender sunfish, Ranzania laevis

==== Balistidae - triggerfish ====
- Grey triggerfish, Balistes capriscus
- Rough triggerfish, Canthidermis maculata

==== Tetraodontidae - pufferfish ====
- Oceanic puffer, Lagocephalus lagocephalus
- Blunthead puffer, Sphoeroides pachygaster

=== Pleuronectiformes - flatfish ===
==== Scophthalmidae - turbots ====
- Fourspotted megrim, Lepidorhombus boscii
- Megrim, Lepidorhombus whiffiagonis
- Norwegian topknot, Phrynorhombus norvegicus
- European turbot, Psetta maxima
- Brill, Scophthalmus rhombus
- Common topknot, Zeugopterus punctatus
- Bloch's topknot, Zeugopterus regius

==== Pleuronectidae - flounders ====
- Torbay sole, Glyptocephalus cynoglossus
- Long rough dab, Hippoglossoides platessoides
- Atlantic halibut, Hippoglossus hippoglossus
- Common dab, Limanda limanda
- Lemon sole, Microstomus kitt
- European flounder, Platichthys flesus
- European plaice, Pleuronectes platessa
- Greenland halibut, Reinhardtius hippoglossoides

==== Soleidae - true soles ====
- Deepwater sole, Bathysolea profundicola
- Solenette, Buglossidium luteum
- De Brito's sole, Microchirus azevia
- Bastard sole, Microchirus theophila
- Thick-backed sole, Microchirus variegatus
- Sand sole, Pegusa lascaris
- Dover sole, Solea solea

==== Cynoglossidae - tonguefish ====
- Nigerian tonguesole, Cynoglossus browni

==== Bothidae - scaldfish ====
- Imperial scaldfish, Arnoglossus imperialis
- Mediterranean scaldfish, Arnoglossus laterna
- Thor's scaldfish, Arnoglossus thori

=== Scorpaeniformes - scorpionfish and allies ===
==== Agonidae - poachers ====
- Pogge, Agonus cataphractus

==== Scorpaenidae - scorpionfish ====
- Black scorpionfish, Scorpaena porcus
- Red scorpionfish, Scorpaena scrofa

==== Cottidae - sculpins ====
- Atlantic hook-eared sculpin, Artediellus atlanticus
- European bullhead, Cottus gobio
- Chabot bullhead, Cottus perifretum
- Twohorn sculpin, Icelus bucornis
- Father lasher, Myoxocephalus scorpius
- Long-spined sea scorpion, Taurulus bubalis
- Norway bullhead, Taurulus lilljeborgi
- Moustache sculpin, Triglops murrayi

==== Psychrolutidae - fatheads ====
- Polar sculpin, Cottunculus microps
- Pallid sculpin, Cottunculus thomsonii

==== Cyclopteridae - lumpsuckers ====
- Lumpsucker, Cyclopterus lumpus

==== Liparidae - snailfish ====
- Speckled snailfish, Careproctus aciculipunctatus
- Merrett's snailfish, Careproctus merretti
- Sea tadpole, Careproctus reinhardti
- Common seasnail, Liparis liparis
- Montagu's snailfish, Liparis montagui
- Deep sea snailfish, Paraliparis abyssorum
- Black snailfish, Paraliparis bathybius
- Paraliparis bipolaris
- Porcupine snailfish, Paraliparis hystrix

==== Sebastidae - rockfish (seaperch) ====
- Bluemouth, Helicolenus dactylopterus
- Rose fish, Sebastes marinus
- Deepwater redfish, Sebastes mentella
- Norway haddock, Sebastes norvegicus
- Red perch, Sebastes viviparus
- Spiny scorpionfish, Trachyscorpia cristulata

==== Dactylopteridae - flying gurnards ====
- Flying gurnard, Dactylopterus volitans

==== Peristediidae - armoured searobins ====
- African armoured searobin, Peristedion cataphractum

==== Triglidae - gurnards ====
- Red gurnard, Aspitriglia cuculus
- Longfin gurnard, Chelidonichthys obscurus
- Grey gurnard, Eutriglia gurnardus
- Long-finned gurnard, Lepidotrigla argus
- Tub gurnard, Trigla lucerna
- Piper gurnard, Trigla lyra
- Streaked gurnard, Trigloporus lastoviza

=== Gobiesociformes - clingfish ===
==== Gobiesocidae - clingfish ====
- Small-headed clingfish, Apletodon dentatus
- Two-spotted clingfish, Diplecogaster bimaculata
- Connemara clingfish, Lepadogaster candolii
- Shore clingfish, Lepadogaster lepadogaster
- Cornish sucker, Lepadogaster purpurea

=== Perciformes - perchlike fishes ===
==== Bramidae - pomfrets ====
- Atlantic pomfret, Brama brama
- Atlantic fanfish, Pterycombus brama
- Rough pomfret, Taractes asper
- Big-scale pomfret, Taractichthys longipinnis

==== Stromateidae - butterfish ====
- Silver pomfret, Pampus argenteus

==== Luvaridae - luvars ====
- Luvar, Luvarus imperialis

==== Callanthiidae - splendid perch ====
- Parrot seaperch, Callanthias ruber

==== Carangidae - jacks ====
- Vadigo, Campogramma glaycos
- Blue runner, Caranx crysos
- Pilotfish, Neucrates ductor
- Guinean amberjack, Seriola carpenteri
- Greater amberjack, Seriola dumerili
- Almaco jack, Seriola rivoliana
- Derbio, Trachinotus ovatus
- Mediterranean horse mackerel, Trachurus mediterraneus
- Atlantic horse mackerel, Trachurus trachurus

==== Centrarchidae - freshwater sunfish ====
- Rock bass, Ambloplites rupestris (introduced)
- Pumpkinseed, Lepomis gibbosus (introduced)
- Bluegill, Lepomis macrochirus (introduced)
- Smallmouth bass, Micropterus dolomieu (introduced)
- Largemouth bass, Micropterus salmoides (introduced)

==== Echeneidae - remoras ====
- Common remora, Remora remora

==== Epigonidae - deepwater cardinalfish ====
- Black cardinal fish, Epigonus telescopus

==== Moronidae - temperate sea bass ====
- European sea bass, Dicentrarchus labrax
- Spotted seabass, Dicentrarchus punctatus
- Striped bass, Morone saxatilis

==== Mullidae - goatfish ====
- Red mullet, Mullus barbatus
- Striped mullet, Mullus surmuletus

==== Percidae - true perch ====
- Ruffe, Gymnocephalus cernua
- European perch, Perca fluviatilis
- Walleye, Sander vitreus (introduced)
- Zander, Stizostedion lucioperca (introduced)

==== Polyprionidae - wreckfish ====
- Atlantic wreckfish, Polyprion americanus

==== Sciaenidae - drums ====
- Meagre, Argyrosomus regius
- Canary drum, Umbrina canariensis
- Ombrine, Umbrina cirrosa

==== Sphyraenidae - barracudas (seapike) ====
- European barracuda, Sphyraena sphyraena

==== Coryphaenidae - dolphinfish ====
- Pompano dolphinfish, Coryphaena equiselis

==== Serranidae - groupers ====
- Goldblotch grouper, Epinephelus costae
- Dusky grouper, Epinephelus marginatus
- Comber, Serranus cabrilla

==== Sparidae - seabream ====
- Bogue, Boops boops
- Common dentex, Dentex dentex
- Pink dentex, Dentex gibbosus
- Morocco dentex, Dentex maroccanus
- White seabream, Diplodus sargus
- Saddled seabream, Oblada melanura
- Spanish bream, Pagellus acarne
- Blackspot seabream, Pagellus bogaraveo
- Pandora bream, Pagellus erythrinus
- Pagre, Pagrus auriga
- Blue-spotted bream, Pagrus caeruleostictus
- Red porgy, Pagrus pagrus
- Salema porgy, Sarpa salpa
- Gilt-head bream, Sparus aurata
- Black sea bream, Spondyliosoma cantharus

==== Cepolidae - bandfish ====
- Big-eyed red bandfish, Cepola macrophthalma
- Red bandfish, Cepola rubescens

==== Labridae - wrasse ====
- Scale-rayed wrasse, Acantholabrus palloni
- Rock cook, Centrolabrus exoletus
- Mediterranean rainbow wrasse, Coris julis
- Baillon's wrasse, Crenilabrus bailloni
- Goldsinny wrasse, Ctenolabrus rupestris
- Ballan wrasse, Labrus bergylta
- Cuckoo wrasse, Labrus mixtus
- Corkwing wrasse, Symphodus melops

==== Cichlidae - cichlids (tilapia) ====
- Nile tilapia, Oreochromis niloticus (introduced)
- Redbelly tilapia, Tilapia zillii (introduced)

==== Anarhichadidae - wolffish ====
- Northern wolffish, Anarhichas denticulatus
- Atlantic wolffish, Anarhichas lupus
- Spotted wolffish, Anarhichas minor

==== Pholidae - gunnels ====
- Rock gunnel, Pholis gunnellus

==== Stichaeidae - pricklebacks ====
- Yarrell's blenny, Chirolophis ascanii
- Spotted eelpout, Leptoclinus maculatus
- Snake blenny, Lumpenus lampretaeformis

==== Zoarcidae - eelpouts ====
- White eelpout, Lycenchelys alba
- Sar's eelpout, Lycenchelys sarsii
- Greater eelpout, Lycodes esmarkii
- Newfoundland eelpout, Lycodes terraenovae
- Vahl's eelpout, Lycodes vahlii
- Snubnose eelpout, Pachycara bulbiceps
- Pachycara crassiceps
- Viviparous eelpout, Zoarces viviparus

==== Ammodytidae - sand eels ====
- Raitt's sand eel, Ammodytes marinus
- Lesser sand eel, Ammodytes tobianus
- Sand lance, Gymnammodytes cicerellus
- Smooth sand eel, Gymnammodytes semisquamatus
- Corbin's sand eel, Hyperoplus immaculatus
- Great sandeel, Hyperoplus lanceolatus

==== Trachinidae - weevers ====
- Lesser weever, Echiichthys vipera
- Greater weever, Trachinus draco

==== Uranoscopidae - stargazers ====
- Northern stargazer, Astroscopus guttatus
- Atlantic stargazer, Astroscopus scaber

==== Blenniidae - typical blennies ====
- Butterfly blenny, Blennius ocellaris
- Montagu's blenny, Coryphoblennius galerita
- Shanny, Lipophrys pholis
- Combtooth blenny, Lipophrys trigloides
- Tompot blenny, Parablennius gattorugine
- Peacock blenny, Salaria pavo

==== Tripterygiidae - threefin blennies ====
- Black-faced blenny, Tripterygion delaisi

==== Callionymidae - dragonets ====
- Common dragonet, Callionymus lyra
- Spotted dragonet, Callionymus maculatus
- Reticulated dragonet, Callionymus reticulatus

==== Gobiidae - gobies ====
- Transparent goby, Aphia minuta
- Jeffrey's goby, Buenia jeffreysii
- Crystal goby, Crystallogobius linearis
- Giant goby, Gobius cobitis
- Couch's goby, Gobius couchi
- Red-mouthed goby, Gobius cruentatus
- Steven's goby, Gobius gasteveni
- Black goby, Gobius niger
- Rock goby, Gobius paganellus
- Spotted goby, Gobiusculus flavescens
- Guillet's goby, Lebetus guilleti
- Diminutive goby, Lebetus scorpioides
- Fries's goby, Leseurigobius friesii
- Lozano's goby, Pomatoschistus lozanoi
- Common goby, Pomatoschistus microps
- Sand goby, Potamoschistus minutus
- Norway goby, Pomatoschistus norvegicus
- Painted goby, Potamoschistus pictus
- Leopard-spotted goby, Thorogobius ephippiatus

==== Gempylidae - snake mackerels ====
- Escolar, Lepidocybium flavobrunneum
- Black gemfish, Nesiarchus nasutus
- Oilfish, Ruvettus pretiosus

==== Trichiuridae - cutlassfish ====
- Black scabbardfish, Aphanopus carbo
- Silver scabbardfish, Lepidopus caudatus
- Largehead hairtail, Trichiurus lepturus

==== Scombridae - mackerel and tuna ====
- Wahoo, Acanthocybium solanderi
- Bullet tuna, Auxis rochei
- Frigate tuna, Auxis thazard
- Little tunny, Euthynnus alletteratus
- Skipjack tuna, Katsuwonus pelamis
- Plain bonito, Orcynopsis unicolor
- Atlantic bonito, Sarda sarda
- Atlantic chub mackerel, Scomber colias
- Spanish mackerel, Scomber japonicus
- Atlantic mackerel, Scomber scombrus
- Albacore, Thunnus alalunga
- Yellowfin tuna, Thunnus albacares
- Bigeye tuna, Thunnus obesus
- Atlantic bluefin tuna, Thunnus thynnus

==== Xiphiidae - swordfish ====
- Swordfish, Xiphias gladius

==== Istiophoridae - billfish ====
- Atlantic sailfish, Istiophorus albicans
- White marlin, Kajikia albidus

==== Centrolophidae - medusafish ====
- Rudderfish, Centrolophus niger
- Barrelfish, Hyperoglyphe perciformis
- Cornish blackfish, Schedophilus medusaphaeus
- Imperial blackfish, Schedophilus ovalis

==== Nomeidae - driftfish ====
- Driftfish, Cubiceps gracilis
- Man-of-war fish, Nomeus gronovii
- Bluefin driftfish, Psenes pellucidus

==== Pomatomidae - bluefish ====
- Bluefish, Pomatomus saltatrix

==== Caproidae - boarfish ====
- Boarfish, Capros aper

== See also ==
- List of fish in the River Trent
