= Oneirodes bradburyae =

Conservation status
- Data Deficient (IUCN 3.1)

Scientific classification
- Kingdom: Animalia
- Phylum: Chordata
- Class: Actinopterygii
- Order: Lophiiformes
- Family: Oneirodidae
- Genus: Oneirodes
- Species: O. bradburyae

Binomial name
- Oneirodes bradburyae M. G. Grey, 1956

Species of fish

Oneirodes bradburyae is a species of marine ray-finned fish belonging to the family Oneirodidae, the dreamers, a family of deep-sea anglerfishes. This fish is known from a single specimen, the holotype which was collected in the Gulf of Mexico at 28°28'N, 87°18'W, the Oregon station 1028, from a depth between the surface and 780 fathoms (4,680 ft; 1,430 m). The species was described in 1956 by the American ichthyologist Marion Griswold Grey of the Field Museum of Natural History in Chicago. The holotype was a female with a standard length of 2.3 cm (0.91 in) and had a very long illicium, no incision on the upper posterior margin of the operculum. The specific name honours the American scientific illustrator and ichthyologist Margaret G. Bradbury, who worked at the Field Museum of Natural History and who illustrated Grey's description.
