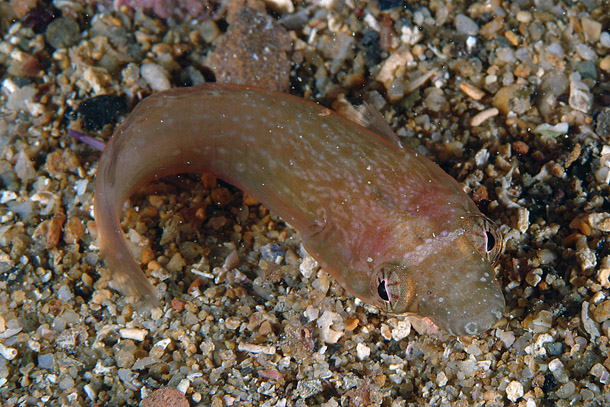
- Connemarra clingfish (Lepadogaster candolii)

Conservation status
- Least Concern (IUCN 3.1)

Scientific classification
- Kingdom: Animalia
- Phylum: Chordata
- Class: Actinopterygii
- Order: Blenniiformes
- Family: Gobiesocidae
- Genus: Lepadogaster
- Species: L. candolii

Binomial name
- Lepadogaster candolii Risso, 1810

Synonyms
- Mirbelia candollei (Risso, 1810); Lepadogaster olivaceus Risso, 1810; Lepadogaster jussieui Risso, 1827; Lepadogaster cephalus Thompson, 1839; Lepadogaster ottaviani Cocco, 1840; Lepadogaster rafinesqui Costa, 1840; Lepadogaster adherens Bonaparte, 1846; Lepadogaster ruber Plucàr, 1846; Lepidogaster chupasangue Yarrell, 1859

= Lepadogaster candolii =

Species of fish

Lepadogaster candolii, common name Connemarra clingfish, is a species of fish in the genus Lepadogaster. It occurs in the Eastern Atlantic from the British Isles (off the coast of Western Scotland and South-West England and Ireland) south to Madeira and the Canary Islands and into the western Mediterranean and the Black Sea. The specific name candolii honours the Swiss botanist Augustin Pyramus de Candolle (1778–1841) and has various spellings: candolii, candolei, candollei, and decandollii, but only the first one is correct. Some workers have found that L. candolii is not closely related to the other two species in the genus Lepadogaster and have proposed the placing of this species in the revived monotypic genus Mirbelia Canestrini, 1864, at least until more definitive taxonomic studies can be undertaken.

L. candolii is considered a euryecious species, meaning that it has a broad variety of living conditions and habitats that it prefers. L. candolii most often inhabit small cavities in the underwater rock face, boulder fields, and seagrass meadows. L. candolii can reach up to 7.5 cm (3.0 in) in length and shares many similarities with L. lepadogaster. Like the Lepadogaster other species, L. candolii has a flattened body and bilateral symmetry. Unlike L. lepadogaster that has a triangular shaped head, L. candolii has a more rounded head and rounded fins. L. candolii has been photographed cleaning dusky grouper (Epinephelus marginatus), even entering the grouper's mouth.
