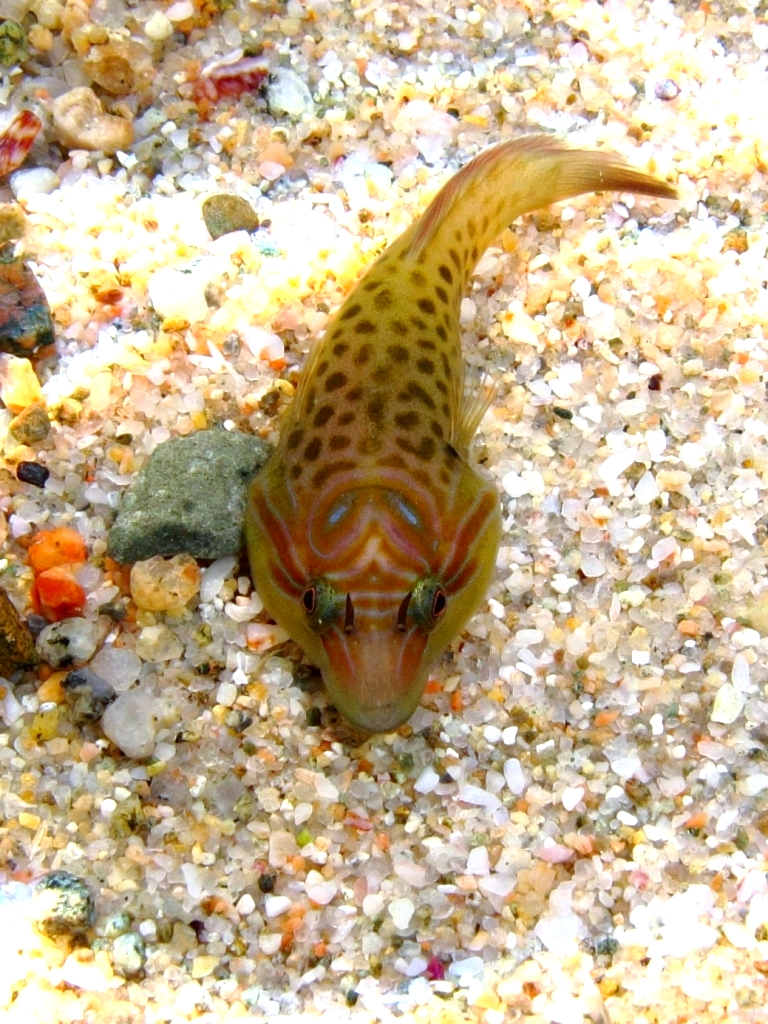
- Lepadogaster lepadogaster

Scientific classification
- Kingdom: Animalia
- Phylum: Chordata
- Class: Actinopterygii
- Order: Blenniiformes
- Family: Gobiesocidae
- Subfamily: Gobiesocinae
- Genus: Lepadogaster; Gouan, 1770

Type species
- Lepadogaster gouanii Risso, 1810

Synonyms
- Lepicephalochromis Fowler, 1943; Mirbelia Canestrini, 1864; Piescephalus Rafinesque, 1810

= Lepadogaster =

Genus of fishes

Lepadogaster is a genus of clingfishes native to the eastern Atlantic Ocean extending into the Mediterranean Sea. Lepadogaster belongs to class Actinopterygii. This means that they share many of the same characteristics as eels, ray-finned fish, and sea horses to name a few. The main characteristic of all of them though is having fin rays. These fin rays are made of webbed skin and are attached to portions of the body that connect fins to the bones. Lepadogaster species have a distinct difference in the formation of their dorsal and anal fins. While most other ray-finned fish spines, branched fin-rays, and middle radials, Lepadogaster species do not have these. Instead, they have cartilage in place of the mentioned features. These clingfish are mainly found near the rocky coasts and inside intertidal zones. Lepadogaster is known mostly as a clingfish, meaning that it spends most of its time attached to the surface of rocks.

Lepadogaster species normally live in intertidal zones and there is frequent species interaction between other fish and other Lepadogaster species. Some of the species have drastically different behaviors, even though they are only a few feet away. For example, L. purpurea exhibits very passive behavior in both its feeding and social patterns. L. candolii on the other hand, exhibits active behavior and is significantly more aggressive than the other species. One other example is seen in their spawning seasons and swim patterns. L. lepadogaster normally spawns during the spring season, while L. purpurea spawns during the winter seasons. This may be the reason why L. lepadogaster is a more active swimmer than L. purpurea.

Lepadogaster has a complex life cycle that is split up into a larval stage, a juvenile stage, and an adult stage. Lepadogaster species spend their larval stages inside an intermediate host; normally plankton. As the larvae mature and leave the plankton, they settle in the benthic layer where they enter their juvenile and adult stages. During this time, the larvae undergo morphological changes that result in their adult forms. Lepadogaster larvae also have feeding patterns similar to those of other shore fish. While most larvae have a "cruise and ambush" pattern of feeding, shore fish employ a "saltatory search," or "pause-travel" feeding pattern. Instead of actively swimming around and searching for food, Lepadogaster remains stationary and scans its surroundings for food. When no food is in range, it swims a short distance away and stops to scan the area again for food. This process repeats itself until the fish finds food. It was also discovered that differences in swim speed and direction during this feeding pattern differ based on size and species.

Lepadogaster species also have an uncommon reproductive strategy that some other shore fish have. Lepadogaster species have semicystic spermatogenesis, which is a rare form of spermatogenesis in which the cyst breaks apart before the spermatozoon stage. The sperm of Lepadogaster also has an odd elongated shape to it.

Some workers have found that while L. lepadogaster and L. purpurea are each other's closest relatives, L. candolli is not closely related to either and have proposed the placing of this species in the revived monotypic genus Mirbelia Canestrini, 1864, at least until more definitive taxonomic studies can be undertaken.

== Species ==
There are currently three recognized species in this genus:

- Lepadogaster candolii A. Risso, 1810 (Connemara clingfish)
- Lepadogaster lepadogaster (Bonnaterre, 1788) (Shore clingfish)
- Lepadogaster purpurea (Bonnaterre, 1788) (Cornish sucker)
