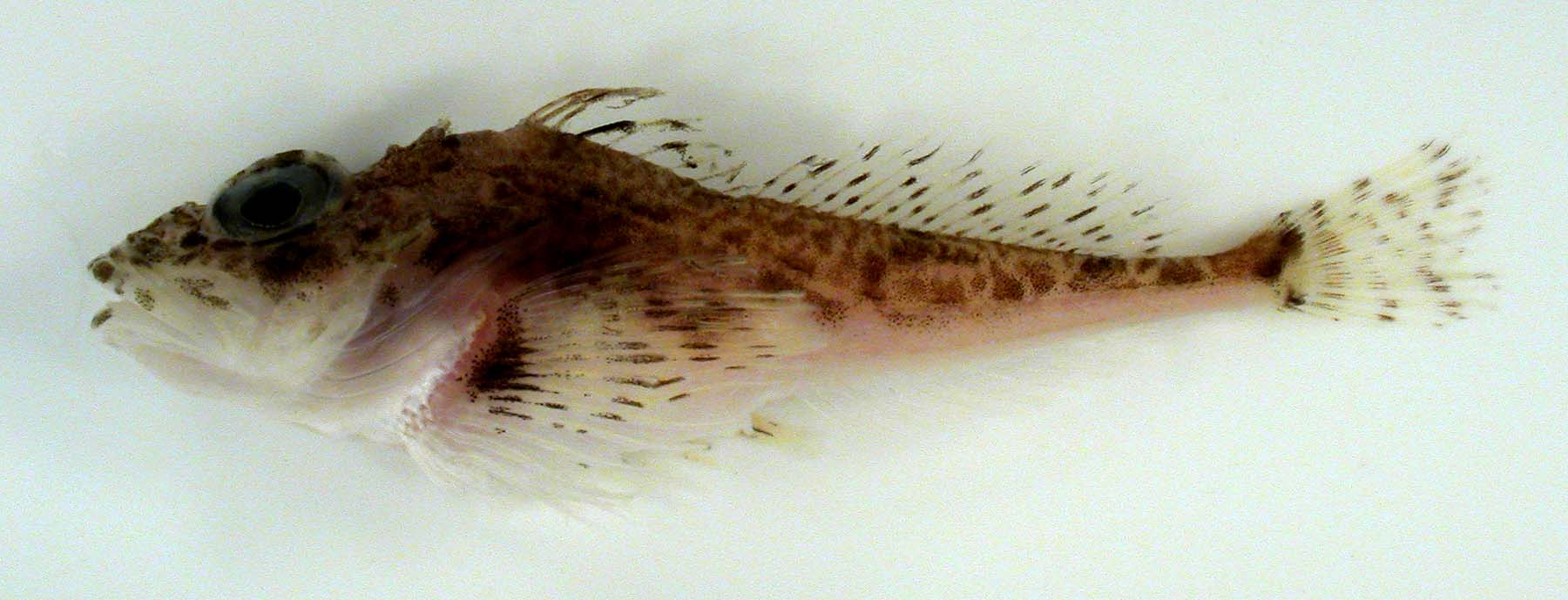
- Icelus spatula

Scientific classification
- Kingdom: Animalia
- Phylum: Chordata
- Class: Actinopterygii
- Division: Teleostei
- Order: Perciformes
- Suborder: Cottoidei
- Family: Psychrolutidae
- Genus: Icelus; Krøyer, 1845

Type species
- Icelus hamatus Krøyer, 1845

Species
- See text.

Synonyms
- Agonocottus Pavlenko, 1910; Icelichthys Schmidt, 1935; Ochotskia Schmidt, 1916

= Scaled sculpin =

Scaled sculpin Temporal range: Middle Miocene to present

Group of fishes

The scaled sculpins, Icelus, are a genus of marine ray-finned fishes belonging to the family Psychrolutidae, the marine sculpins. Most of the fishes in this genus are found in the northern Pacific Ocean but they also occur in the North Atlantic Ocean.

== Taxonomy ==
The scaled sculpin genus, Icelus was first proposed as a monospecific genus in 1845 by the Danish zoologist Henrik Nikolai Krøyer when he described Icelus hamatus as a new species from Belsund in Spitsbergen. L. hamatus has since been determined to be synonym of Cottus bicornis, which had been described by Johan Reinhardt in 1840 from East Greenland. The 5th edition of Fishes of the World classifies the genus Artediellus within the subfamily Cottinae of the family Cottidae, however, other authors classify the genus within the subfamily Icelinae of the family Psychrolutidae. Previously this genus was classified as the only genus in the family Icelidae which was proposed in 1923 by David Starr Jordan.

== Etymology ==
The scaled sculpin genus name, Icelus, is the name of one of the sons of Hypnus, a Greek god of sleep and is a reference to the sluggish movements of many northern sculpin species.

== Species ==
The 19 recognised species in this genus are:

- Icelus armatus (P. J. Schmidt, 1916)
- Icelus bicornis (J. C. H. Reinhardt, 1840) (twohorn sculpin)
- Icelus canaliculatus C. H. Gilbert, 1896 (blacknose sculpin)
- Icelus cataphractus (Pavlenko, 1910)
- Icelus crassus Andriashev, 1937
- Icelus ecornis Tsutsui & Yabe, 1996
- Icelus euryops Bean, 1890
- Icelus gilberti Taranetz, 1936
- Icelus hypselopterus Fukuzawa, Mori, Matsuzaki & Kai, 2022
- Icelus mandibularis Yabe, 1983
- Icelus mororanis (Jordan & Seale, 1906)
- Icelus ochotensis P. J. Schmidt, 1927
- Icelus perminovi Taranetz, 1936 (scaly-belly sculpin)
- Icelus rastrinoides Taranetz, 1936
- Icelus sekii Tsuruoka, Munehara & Yabe, 2006
- Icelus spatula C. H. Gilbert & Burke, 1912 (spatulate sculpin)
- Icelus spiniger C. H. Gilbert, 1896 (thorny sculpin)
- Icelus stenosomus Andriashev, 1937
- Icelus uncinalis C. H. Gilbert & Burke, 1912

An indeterminate fossil specimen of Icelus is known from the Middle Miocene of Sakhalin, Russia.

== Characteristics ==
Scaled sculpins are characterised by having a single row of large, spiny plate-like scales underneath the dorsal fins, having spinous tube-like scales on the lateral line, they have scales on the axil of the pectoral fins as well as on the upper part of the eye. They also have a spine or bump on the nuchal bone. These fishes vary in size from the smallest, I. sekii, with a maximum published standard length of 5.3 cm (2.1 in), to the largest, I. cataphractus, which has a maximum published total length of 30 cm (12 in).

== Distribution ==
Scaled sculpins are mainly Pacific species, 16 of the 18 species being found in the North Pacific Ocean, with 2 species, the twohorn sculpin (I. bicornis) and the spatulate sculpin (I. spatula) being found in the Atlantic Ocean, the latter also being found in the Arctic Ocean.
