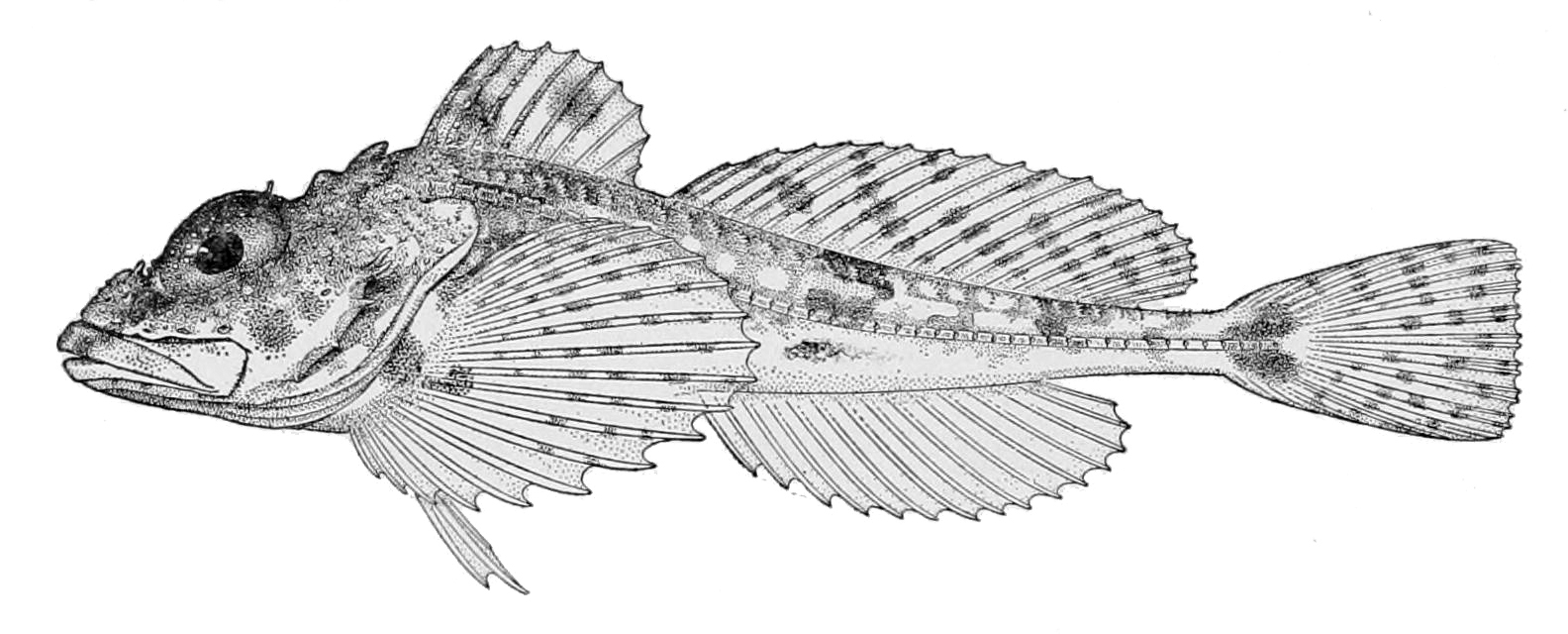

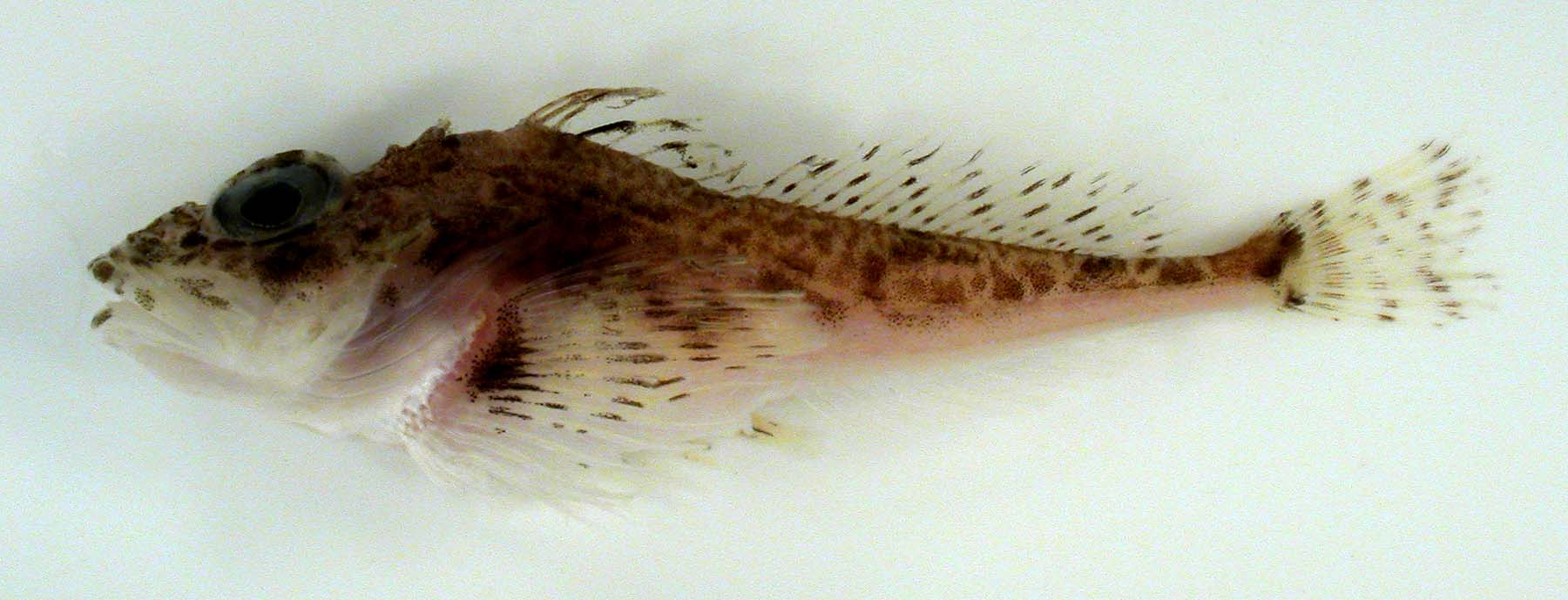

Scientific classification
- Domain: Eukaryota
- Kingdom: Animalia
- Phylum: Chordata
- Class: Actinopterygii
- Order: Perciformes
- Suborder: Cottoidei
- Family: Cottidae
- Genus: Icelus
- Species: I. spatula

Binomial name
- Icelus spatula C. H. Gilbert & Burke, 1912

Synonyms
- Icelus spatula spatula Gilbert & Burke, 1912

= Icelus spatula =

Species of fish

Icelus spatula, or the spatulate sculpin, is a marine fish in the family Cottidae. It can be found throughout the Arctic and the Northwestern Atlantic.

== Description ==
Juveniles of the species have two dark colored patches on their body. As they age, these patches break up to form intermittent brown spots. The tail fin is also speckled, while the anal and pelvic fins are uncolored. The average length is 12.9 cm, with a maximum reported age of seven years.

== Size ==
This species reaches a length of 21.0 cm (8.3 in).

== Etymology ==
The fish is named after a paddle, a spoon or a broad blade used for stirring, referring to "distinctly spatular" shape of the anal papilla of the male.
