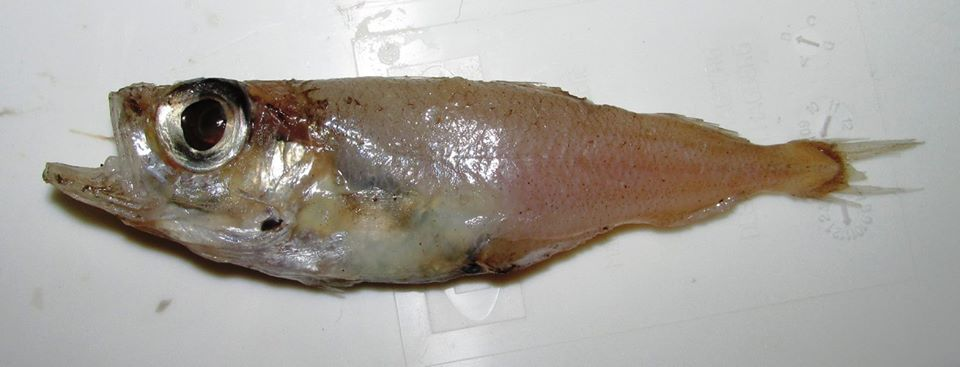

Scientific classification
- Kingdom: Animalia
- Phylum: Chordata
- Class: Actinopterygii
- Order: Gadiformes
- Family: Gadidae
- Genus: Gadiculus; Guichenot, 1850

Type species
- Gadiculus argenteus Guichenot, 1850

= Gadiculus =

Genus of fishes

Gadiculus, or the silvery pouts, is a genus of cod, fishes in the family Gadidae. They are distributed in the coastal waters of the Northeast Atlantic and the adjacent Mediterranean Sea. They do not grow larger than 15 cm (5.9 in) and are of minor importance to local commercial fisheries.

== Species ==
Two species of Gadiculus are currently recognized:

- Gadiculus argenteus, in the western Mediterranean and adjacent Atlantic waters
- Gadiculus thori, from the Bay of Biscay north up to the North Cape.
