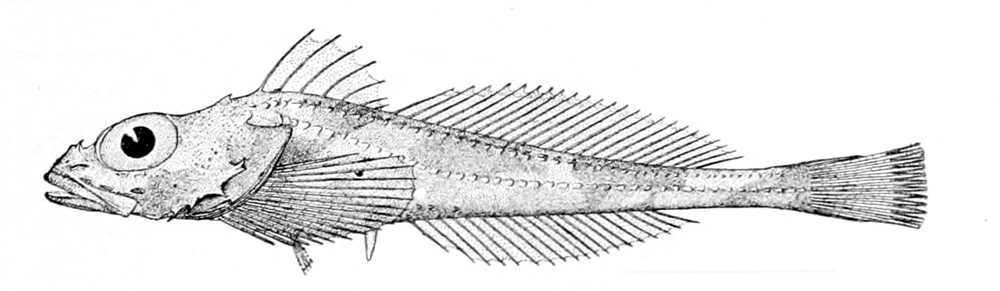

Scientific classification
- Domain: Eukaryota
- Kingdom: Animalia
- Phylum: Chordata
- Class: Actinopterygii
- Order: Perciformes
- Suborder: Cottoidei
- Family: Psychrolutidae
- Genus: Icelus
- Species: I. canaliculatus

Binomial name
- Icelus canaliculatus C. H. Gilbert, 1896

= Icelus canaliculatus =

Species of fish

Icelus canaliculatus, or the blacknose sculpin, is a marine fish in the family Cottidae. It can be found throughout the North Pacific, from Hokkaido, Japan and the Navarin Canyon in the Bering Sea to the Aleutian chain and the Gulf of Alaska.

== Size ==
This species reaches a length of 21.1 cm (8.3 in).
