= List of fishes of the River Trent =

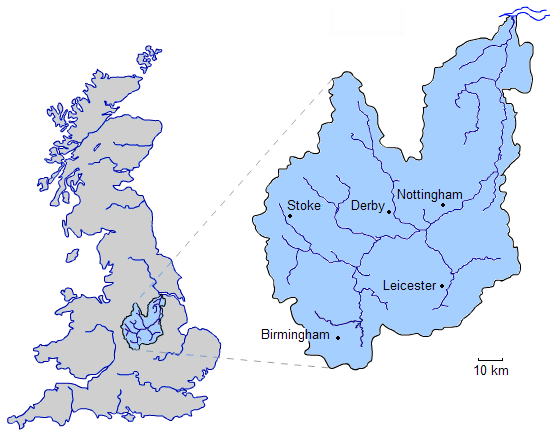
Map showing location of the River Trent

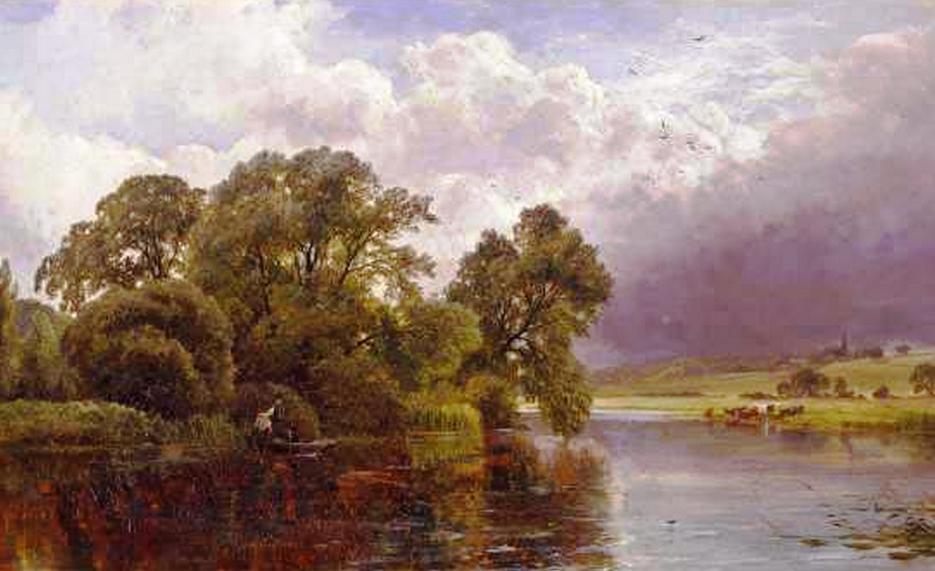
The Trent near Castle Donington by George Turner, 1881: King's Mill near Castle Donington was the location for catches of sturgeon and eels.

This list of fishes of the River Trent includes fish species which have been recorded from the River Trent, a major river in England that starts in Staffordshire, flows through the Midlands, and joins the River Ouse to form the Humber Estuary.

The impressive diversity of fish species in this river has been known (and celebrated) since 1590, with poetry containing the earliest mention that the Trent contains 30 kinds of fish. The earliest actual list of fish in the river is from 1641. Over the centuries some species have since become locally extinct, and other species have been introduced.

== Earliest literary references ==
In 1590, Edmund Spenser in The Faerie Queene described the River Trent and its fish fauna as follows:

The beauteous Trent which in itself enseams,
Thirty kinds of fish and thirty different streams.

This couplet was closely echoed in 1612, in Michael Drayton's Poly-Olbion description of the Trent:

Or thirty kinds of fish that in my streams do live

These poems have been a source of curiosity to a number of fishing experts, who have endeavoured to guess the identity of the thirty fish alluded to in the poems.

== 1641 list ==
The earliest known list of fish from the River Trent was from 1641. Although the list contains thirty names, one of them is not a fish by modern standards, but an edible crustacean, the crayfish. The list also includes some fish names that no longer exist in modern English, such as Frenches and lenbrood; these species are therefore unidentifiable.

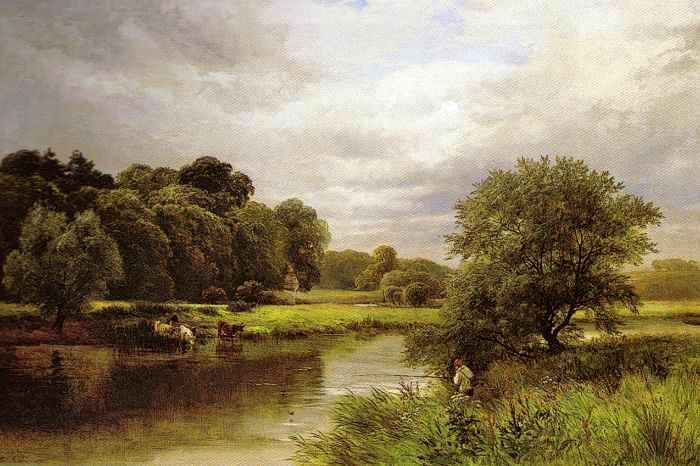
Fishing on the Trent near Ingleby by George Turner, 1850

The 1641 list of 30 species (verbatim, note antique spelling of some names):

Barbet, Bream, Bullhead, Burbolts, Carp, Chevin, Crayfish, Dates, Eel, Flounder, Frenches, Gudgeon, Grayling, Lampern, Lamphrey, Lenbrood, Loach, Minnows, Pickeral, Pinks, Perch, Roach, Ruff, Salmon, Shad, Smelt, Sticklebats, Sturgeon, Trout, Whitling.

=== Note on the sturgeon ===
The largest of these fish was the sturgeon, a species which at one time was fairly frequently caught in the Trent, but only in low numbers. Notable examples included a sturgeon of eight feet taken near Donington Castle in 1255, and another at nearby King's Mill of seven feet in 1791. The last known catch was in 1902 near Holme, Nottinghamshire; the fish was eight-and-a-half-feet long and weighed 250 pounds.

== 1676 description ==
In 1676 in Izaak Walton described the River Trent as "One of the finest rivers in the world and the most abounding with excellent salmon and all sorts of delicate fish."

Walton also speculated (incorrectly) that the name of the River Trent might be based on the number of fish species, that the Trent is "so called from thirty kind of fishes that are found in it, or for that it receiveth thirty lesser rivers".

== 1751 list ==
In 1751, Charles Deering provided a list of 34 kinds, under the title An Alphabetical List of All the Fish Catch'd in the River Trent. This list read (verbatim);

Barbel, Bream, Bulhead, Burbot, Carp, Chub, Crayfish, Dace, Eel, Flounder, Grayling, Gudgeon, Lamprey, Lampern, Loach, Minnow, Muscle, Perch, Pike, Roach, Rud, Ruff, Salmon, Salmon Trout, Salmon Pink, Sand Eel, Shad, Smelt, Strickleback, Sturgeon, Stream Pink, Tench, Trout, and Whitling.

This list also includes several unrecognizable fish. It also lists three names for salmon, as well as whitling, which is a name for a young male trout, and muscle, which is probably a reference to freshwater mussels, formerly used as food in some areas.

== 1829 ==
Glover reproduced Deering's list in his History and Gazetteer of the County of Derby, and also provided further information on many of the then known species in the companion volume, The History of the County of Derby (Volume 1).

== 1985 ==
In 1985, a study of anglers' catches stated that the "Trent supports about 40 species", but they were not listed. The fish that were caught most often, and were important to anglers, included barbel, bream, bleak, carp, chub, dace, eel, gudgeon, perch, and roach.

== 2007 non-native species ==
Non-native species that had a sustainable population in the river were listed in 2007, and included the European bitterling (Rhodeus amarus), carp (Cyprinus carpio), and zander (Sander lucioperca).

== Master list ==
This list is based on Deering's 1829 list. It includes the locally extinct species as well as the more recent additions, but it does not claim to be fully comprehensive; other species may occur in the river but are as yet undocumented.

| Number | Name | Image | Other names | Species name in 1829 Modern species name | Notes | References |
|---|---|---|---|---|---|---|
| 1. | Barbel | | Barbet | Cyprinus barbus Barbus barbus | | |
| 2. | Bitterling | | European bitterling | Not listed in 1829; Rhodeus amarus | Non native | |
| 3. | Bleak | | | Cyprinus Alburnus; Alburnus alburnus | | |
| 4. | Bream | | | Cyprinus Brama; Abramis brama | | |
| 5. | Bullhead | | Bulhead; River bullhead | Cottius Gobio; Cottus gobio | | |
| 6. | Burbot | | Eelpout | Cyprinus Barbus; Lota lota | Locally extinct | |
| 7. | Carp | | Common carp | Cyprinus Carpio; Cyprinus carpio | Non native | |
| 8. | Chub | | Chevin; European chub | Cyprinus Jeses; Squalius cephalus | | |
| 9. | Dace | | | Cyprinus Leuciscus; Leuciscus leuciscus | | |
| 10. | Eel | | Common eel | Anguilla Vulgaris; Anguilla anguilla | | |
| 11. | Flounder | | | Pleuronectes Flesus; Platichthys flesus | | |
| 12. | Grayling | | | Salmo Thymallus; Thymallus thymallus | | |
| 13. | Gudgeon | | | Cyprinus Gobio; Gobio gobio | | |
| 14. | Brook lamprey | | | Not listed in 1829; Lampetra planeri | | |
| 15. | Lamprey | | Lamprey nine eyed eel Lampern seven eyed eel | Petromyzon Fluviatilis; Lampetra fluviatilis | | |
| 16. | Loach | | Groundling loach Spined loach | Cobitis taenia Cobitis taenia | | |
| 17. | Minnow | | Pink | Cyprinus Phoxinus; Phoxinus phoxinus | | |
| 18. | Perch | | Common perch | Percea Fluviatilis; Perca fluviatilis | | |
| 19. | Pike | | Common pike | Esox Lucius; Esox lucius | | |
| 20. | Roach | | | Cyprinus Rutilus; Rutilus rutilus | | |
| 21. | Rudd | | | Not listed in 1829; Scardinius erythropthalmus | | |
| 22. | Ruffe | | Ruffe or pope | Perca Cernua; Gymnocephalus cernua | | |
| 23. | Salmon | | Common salmon Atlantic salmon | Salmo Salar; Salmo salar | Locally extinct but reintroduced | |
| 24. | Sand eel | | | Not listed in 1829; Family Ammodytidae | | |
| 25. | Shad | | | Not listed in 1829; Genus Alosa | | |
| 26. | Smelt | | European smelt | Not listed in 1829; Osmerus eperlanus | | |
| 27. | Stickleback | | Strickleback; Common stickleback Three-spined stickleback | Gasterosteus Aculeatus; Gasterosteus aculeatus | | |
| 28. | Sturgeon | | European sea sturgeon Common sturgeon | Acipenser sturio Acipenser sturio | Locally extinct | |
| 29. | Tench | | | Cyprinus Tinca; Tinca tinca | | |
| 30. | Trout | | Common trout Brown trout Whitling - young male | Salmo Fario; Salmo trutta | | |
| 31. | Zander | | | Not listed in 1829; Sander lucioperca | Non native | |

== See also ==
- List of fishes of Great Britain
- Angling records in the United Kingdom
