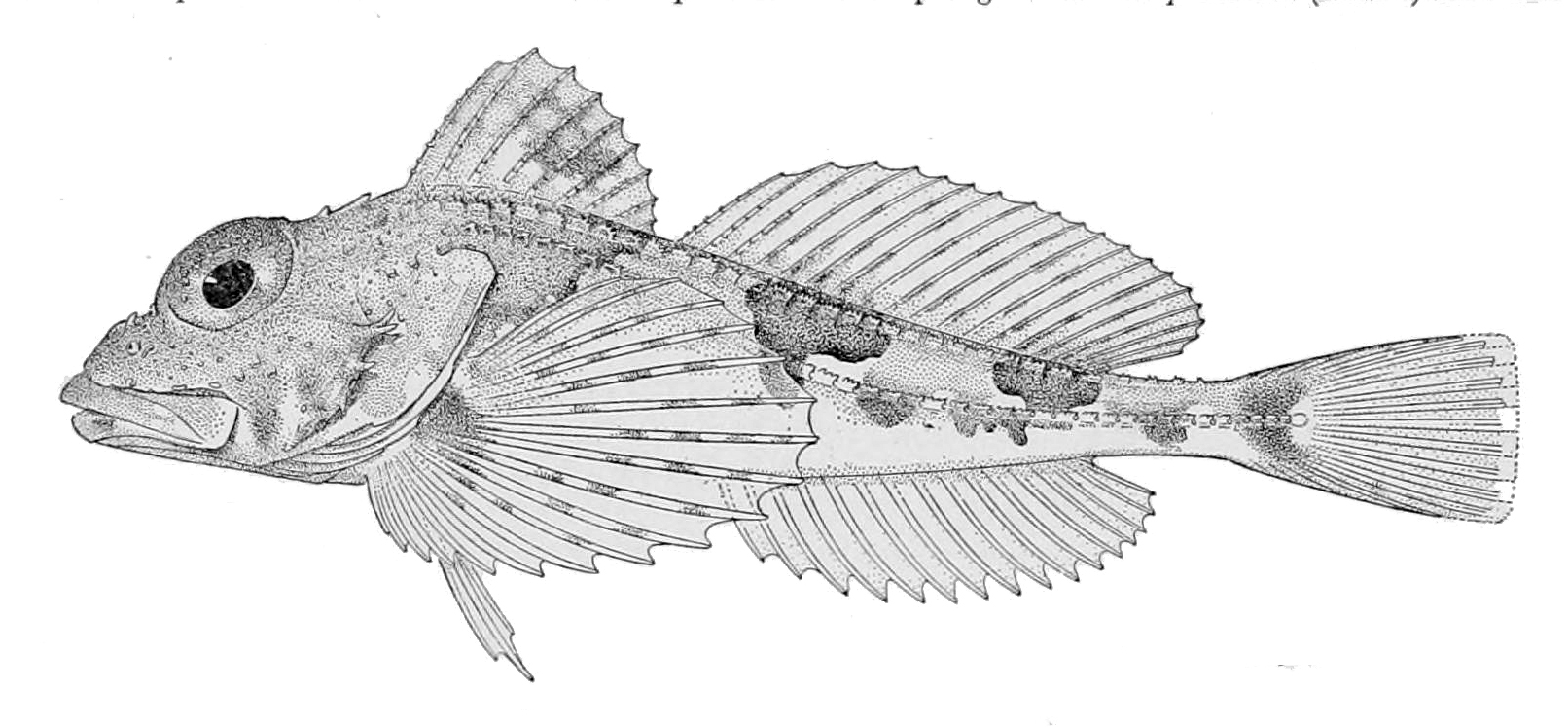

Scientific classification
- Kingdom: Animalia
- Phylum: Chordata
- Class: Actinopterygii
- Order: Perciformes
- Suborder: Cottoidei
- Family: Psychrolutidae
- Genus: Icelus
- Species: I. uncinalis

Binomial name
- Icelus uncinalis C. H. Gilbert & Burke, 1912

= Icelus uncinalis =

Species of fish

Icelus uncinalis, is a marine fish in the family Cottidae. It can be found throughout the Northeast Pacific, Bering Sea and Alaska.

== Size ==
This species reaches a length of 16.0 cm (6.3 in).

== Etymology ==
The fish's name is from uncinus, hooked; analis, anal, referring to the short, curved, hook-shaped process of the anal papilla of the male.
