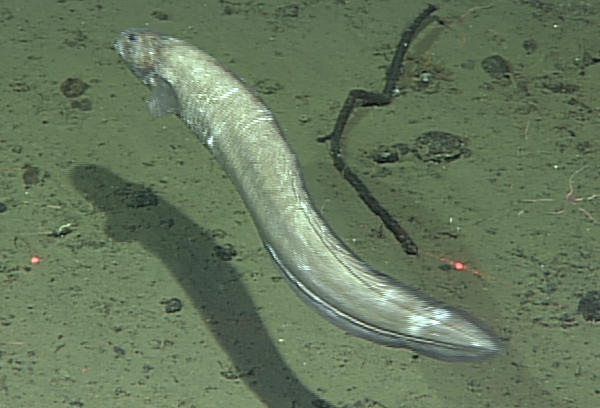
- Pachycara sp.

Scientific classification
- Kingdom: Animalia
- Phylum: Chordata
- Class: Actinopterygii
- Order: Perciformes
- Family: Zoarcidae
- Subfamily: Lycodinae
- Genus: Pachycara; Zugmayer, 1911

Type species
- Pachycara obesa Zugmayer, 1911

Synonyms
- Austrolycichthys Regan, 1913; Pachycarichthys Whitley, 1931

= Pachycara =

Genus of fishes

Pachycara is a genus of marine ray-finned fishes belonging to the family Zoarcidae, the eelpouts. The fishes in this genus are found in the Atlantic, Indian, Southern and Pacific Ocean.

== Species ==
There are currently 29 recognized species in this genus:

- Pachycara alepidotum M. E. Anderson & Mincarone, 2006
- Pachycara angeloi Thiel, Kneblsberger, Kihara & Gerdes, 2021
- Pachycara andersoni Møller, 2003 (Anderson's eelpout)
- Pachycara arabica Møller, 2003 (Arabian eelpout)
- Pachycara brachycephalum (Pappenheim, 1912)
- Pachycara bulbiceps (Garman, 1899) (Snub-nose eelpout)
- Pachycara caribbaeum M. E. Anderson, R. N. Somerville & Copley, 2016
- Pachycara cousinsi Møller & N. J. King 2007 (Brown eelpout)
- Pachycara crassiceps (Roule, 1916)
- Pachycara crossacanthum M. E. Anderson, 1989
- Pachycara dolichaulus M. E. Anderson, 2006
- Pachycara garricki M. E. Anderson, 1990
- Pachycara goni M. E. Anderson, 1991
- Pachycara gymninium M. E. Anderson & Peden, 1988 (Naked-nape eelpout)
- Pachycara karenae M. E. Anderson, 2012
- Pachycara lepinium M. E. Anderson & Peden, 1988 (Scaly-nape eelpout)
- Pachycara matallanasi Corbella & Møller, 2014
- Pachycara mesoporum M. E. Anderson, 1989
- Pachycara microcephalum (A. S. Jensen, 1902)
- Pachycara moelleri Shinohara, 2012
- Pachycara nazca M. E. Anderson & Bluhm, 1997
- Pachycara pammelas M. E. Anderson, 1989
- Pachycara priedei Møller & N. J. King, 2007
- Pachycara rimae M. E. Anderson, 1989
- Pachycara saldanhai Biscoito & A. J. T. Almeida, 2004
- Pachycara shcherbachevi M. E. Anderson, 1989
- Pachycara sulaki M. E. Anderson, 1989
- Pachycara suspectum (Garman, 1899)
- Pachycara thermophilum Geistdoerfer, 1994
