= Lebetus patzneri =

Conservation status
- Data Deficient (IUCN 3.1)

Scientific classification
- Kingdom: Animalia
- Phylum: Chordata
- Class: Actinopterygii
- Order: Gobiiformes
- Family: Oxudercidae
- Genus: Lebetus
- Species: L. patzneri

Binomial name
- Lebetus patzneri Schliewen, Kovačić & Ordines, 2019

Species of fish

Lebetus patzneri, commonly known as Patzner's goby, is a species of fish belonging to the family Gobiidae.

The species was only described in 2019 and is currently only known from the waters around the Balearic Islands, in Spain.
