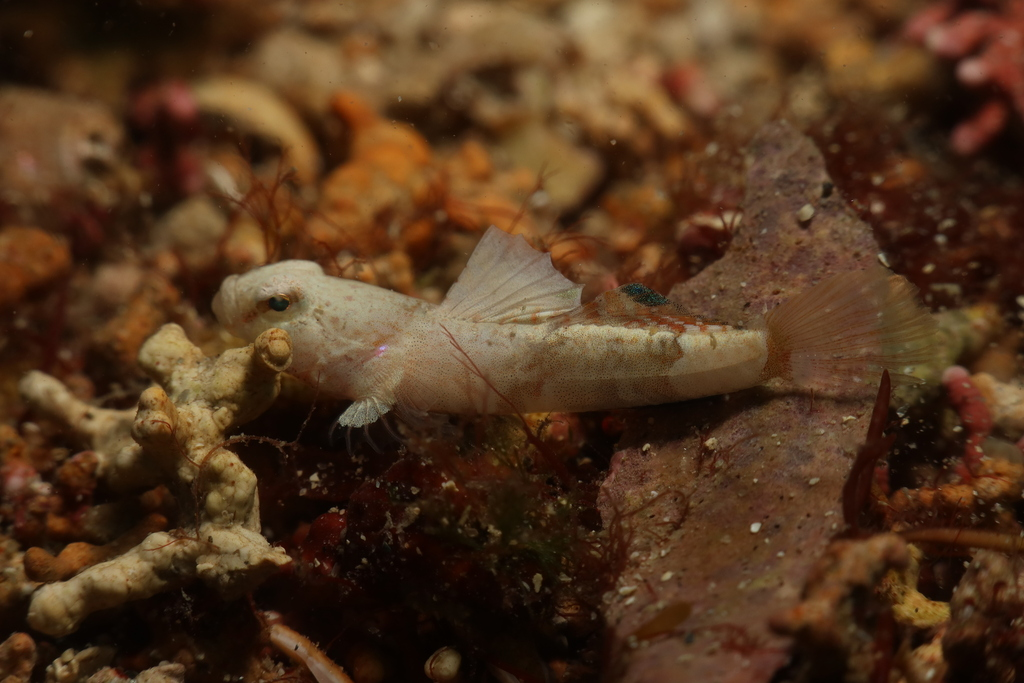

Conservation status
- Least Concern (IUCN 3.1)

Scientific classification
- Kingdom: Animalia
- Phylum: Chordata
- Class: Actinopterygii
- Order: Gobiiformes
- Family: Oxudercidae
- Genus: Lebetus
- Species: L. guilleti

Binomial name
- Lebetus guilleti (Le Danois, 1913)

Synonyms
- Gobius scorpioides subsp. guilleti Le Danois 1913

= Lebetus guilleti =

Species of fish

Lebetus guilleti, commonly known as Guillet's goby, is a species of fish belonging to the family Gobiidae.

It is native to the coasts of the eastern Atlantic from Norway south to Madeira and the Canary Islands.
