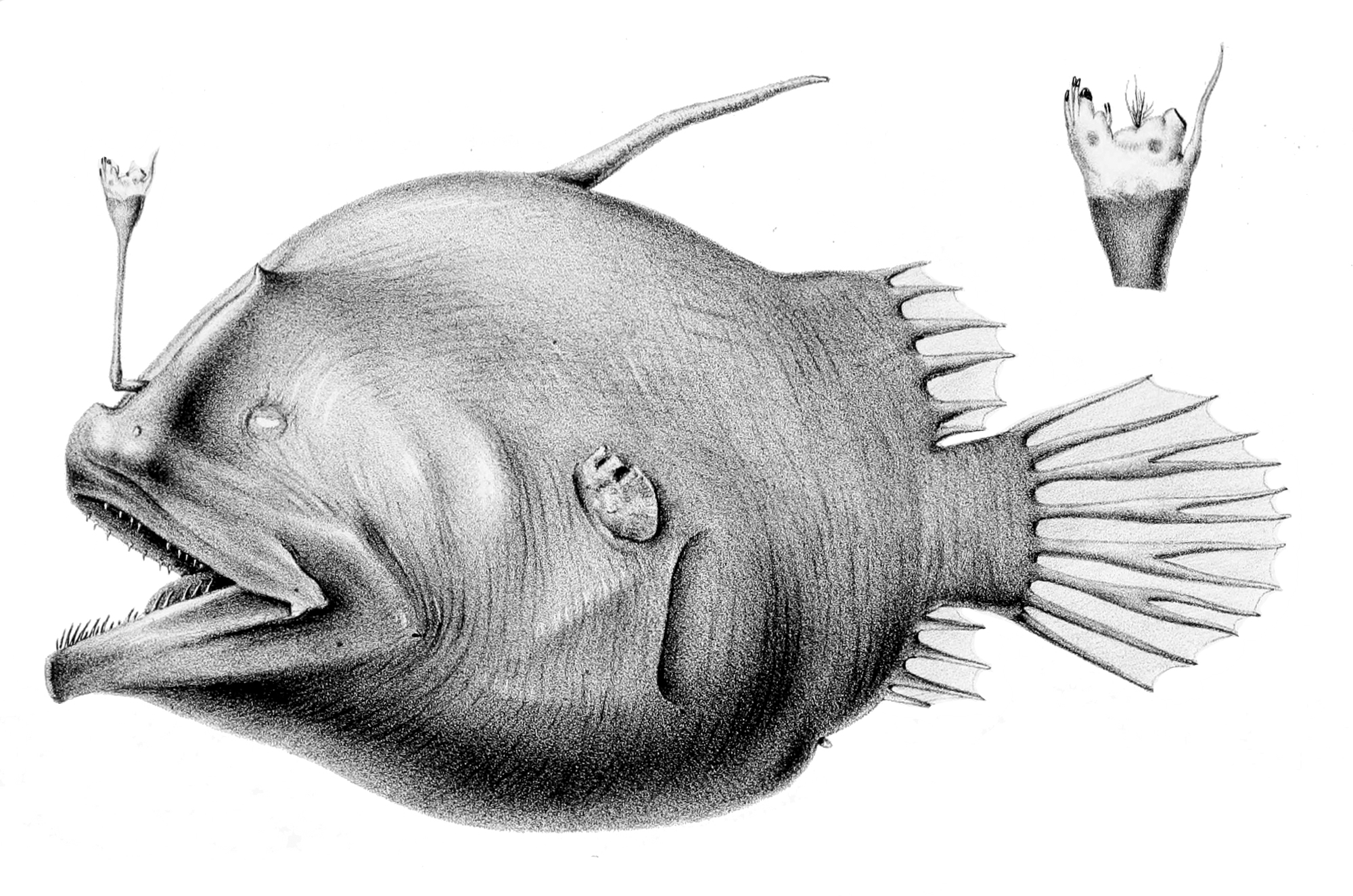
- Oneirodes eschrichtii
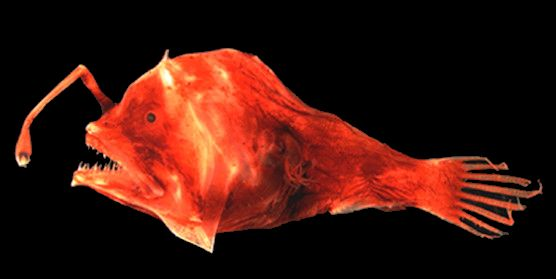
- Oneirodes sp.

Scientific classification
- Kingdom: Animalia
- Phylum: Chordata
- Class: Actinopterygii
- Order: Lophiiformes
- Family: Oneirodidae
- Genus: Oneirodes; Lütken, 1871

Type species
- Oneirodes eschrichtii Lütken, 1871

Synonyms
- Caranactis Regan & Trewavas, 1932; Monoceratias Gilbert, 1915

= Oneirodes =

Genus of fishes

Oneirodes is a genus of marine ray-finned fish belonging to the family Oneirodidae, the dreamers, a family of deep sea anglerfishes. These predatory, deep-sea fishes are found around the world. This is the type genus, and the most speciose genus, of the family Oneirodidae. They are sexually dimorphic but, like most taxa within their family, the small males are free living and are not sexual parasites on the larger females. Only the females are used to identify the species in this genus as no species specific characters have been found for males.

== Taxonomy ==
Oneirodes was first proposed as a monospecific genus in 1871 by the Danish zoologist and naturalist Christian Frederik Lütken when he described Oneirodes eschrichtii. Lütken gave the type locality of O. eschrichtii as off the western coast of Greenland. The 5th edition of Fishes of the World classifies this genus in the family Oneirodidae in the suborder Ceratioidei of the anglerfish order Lophiiformes. Theodore Gill named the family Oneirodidae in 1878 with O. escherichtii as its only species, making Oneirodes the type genus of its family.

== Etymology ==
Oneirodes means "dream-like". Lütken did not explain this choice of name. David Starr Jordan and Barton Warren Evermann suggested in 1898 that the name referred to the small, skin-covered eyes. Alternatively, in 2009, Theodore Wells Pietsch III proposed that the name was given because the fish is "so strange and marvelous that it could only be imagined in the dark of the night during a state of unconsciousness”.

== Species ==
Oneirodes is the most speciose genus in the family Oneirodidae and has the following species classified within it:

- Oneirodes acanthias C. H. Gilbert, 1915 (Spiny dreamer)
- Oneirodes alius Seigel & Pietsch, 1978
- Oneirodes amaokai H. C. Ho & Kawai, 2016 (Amaoka's dreamer)
- Oneirodes anisacanthus Regan, 1925
- Oneirodes basili Pietsch, 1974
- Oneirodes bradburyae M. G. Grey, 1956
- Oneirodes bulbosus W. M. Chapman, 1939
- Oneirodes carlsbergi Regan & Trewavas, 1932
- Oneirodes clarkei Swinney & Pietsch, 1988
- Oneirodes cordifer Prokofiev, 2014
- Oneirodes cristatus Regan & Trewavas, 1932
- Oneirodes dicromischus Pietsch, 1974
- Oneirodes epithales J. W. Orr, 1991 (Nightmare dreamer)
- Oneirodes eschrichtii Lütken, 1871 (Bulbous dreamer)
- Oneirodes flagellifer Regan & Trewavas, 1932
- Oneirodes formosanus H. C. Ho & K. T. Shao, 2019
- Oneirodes haplonema A. L. Stewart & Pietsch, 1998
- Oneirodes heteronema Regan & Trewavas, 1932
- Oneirodes kreffti Pietsch, 1974 (Krefft's dreamer)
- Oneirodes luetkeni Regan, 1925
- Oneirodes macronema Regan & Trewavas, 1932
- Oneirodes macrosteus Pietsch, 1974
- Oneirodes melanocauda Bertelsen, 1951
- Oneirodes micronema Grobecker, 1978
- Oneirodes mirus Regan & Trewavas, 1932
- Oneirodes myrionemus Pietsch, 1974
- Oneirodes notius Pietsch, 1974
- Oneirodes parapietschi Prokofiev, 2014
- Oneirodes pietschi H. C. Ho & K. T. Shao, 2004
- Oneirodes plagionema Pietsch & Seigel, 1980
- Oneirodes posti Bertelsen & Grobecker, 1980
- Oneirodes pterurus Pietsch & Seigel, 1980
- Oneirodes quadrinema H. C. Ho, Kawai & Amaoka, 2016 (Indonesian dreamer)
- Oneirodes rosenblatti Pietsch, 1974
- Oneirodes sabex Pietsch & Seigel, 1980 (Rough dreamer)
- Oneirodes sanjeevani Rajeeshkumar, 2017
- Oneirodes schistonema Pietsch & Seigel, 1980
- Oneirodes schmidti Regan & Trewavas, 1932
- Oneirodes sipharum Prokofiev, 2014
- Oneirodes theodoritissieri Belloc, 1938
- Oneirodes thompsoni L. P. Schultz, 1934 (Alaska dreamer)
- Oneirodes thysanema Pietsch & Seigel, 1980

A fossil member of this genus was found from Miocene-aged deposits of Sakhalin Island.

== Characteristics ==
Oneiriodes dreamers are characterised by having spines on the sphenotic bone, a deep incision on the rear edge of the operculum, and rod-shaped pelvic bones that are not expanded or expanded only slightly at the tips. The lobe of the pectoral fin is short and wide with the length of the lobe being less than that of the longest pelvic fin rays. There is a spine on the symphysis of the lower jaw and the lower margin of this symphysis is convex. The rays of the caudal fin have no internal pigmentation and the black skin on the caudal peduncle does not extend past the base of the caudal fin. The illicium merges from between the frontal bones, the frontal bones are curved on their upper margin, and the subopercular bone is short and wide with a nearly circular lower part. There are 4, occasionally 5, soft rays in the anal fin. A unique character of the metamorphosed females of Oneirodes is that the posterior end of the pterygiophore of the illicium emerges from the skin on the back, behind the head. The males have unpigmented skin between the nostrils, and the inner surface of the subopercle is also unpigmented. The caudal peduncle has no subdermal pigments, and there are between 7 and 13 denticles on the lower jaw. The females range in standard length from 10 to 213 mm (0.39 to 8.39 in), and the published species descriptions are based on females as there are no known morphological character that separate the males by species. The males are free-living and non-parasitic. Male specimens measure between 7.5 and 16 mm (0.30 and 0.63 in).

== Distribution and habitat ==
Oneirodes dreamers are found in the Atlantic, Pacific and Indian Oceans. They are bathydemersal fishes found at depths between 0 and 3,800 m (0 and 12,467 ft).
