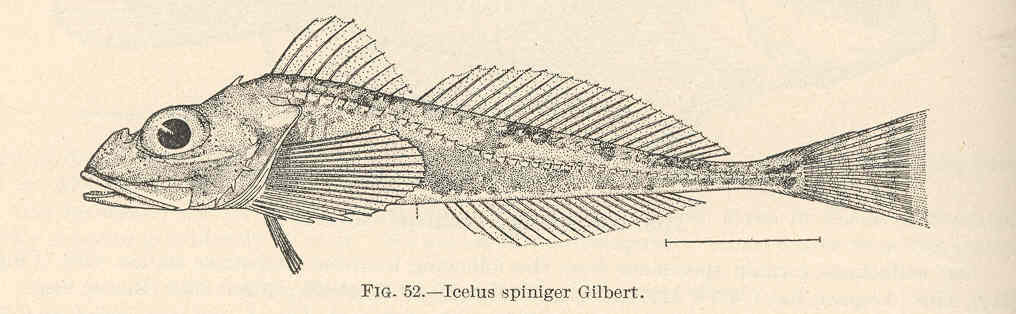

Scientific classification
- Domain: Eukaryota
- Kingdom: Animalia
- Phylum: Chordata
- Class: Actinopterygii
- Order: Perciformes
- Suborder: Cottoidei
- Family: Psychrolutidae
- Genus: Icelus
- Species: I. spiniger

Binomial name
- Icelus spiniger C. H. Gilbert, 1896

= Icelus spiniger =

Species of fish

Icelus spiniger, the thorny sculpin, is a marine fish in the family Cottidae. It can be found throughout the North Pacific, the eastern Sea of Okhotsk to Cape Navarin in the Bering Sea to Agattu Island in the Aleutian island chain and Vancouver Island, British Columbia, Canada.

== Size ==
This species reaches a length of 24.0 cm (9.4 in).
