= Oneirodes sanjeevani =

Conservation status
- Data Deficient (IUCN 3.1)

Scientific classification
- Kingdom: Animalia
- Phylum: Chordata
- Class: Actinopterygii
- Order: Lophiiformes
- Family: Oneirodidae
- Genus: Oneirodes
- Species: O. sanjeevani

Binomial name
- Oneirodes sanjeevani Rajeeshjumar, 2017

Species of fish

Oneirodes sanjeevani is a species of marine ray-finned fish belonging to the family Oneirodidae, the dreamers, a family of deep sea anglerfishes known by a single specimen which was described in March 2017. The holotype was recovered by midwater trawling in the Indian Ocean west of the Maldives at 00.87°S, 67.59°E from a depth between 380 and 600 meters. The holotype, a female, has a standard length of 6.9 cm (2.7 in), with 5 soft rays in its dorsal fin and 4 in its anal fin. It is named in honor of Dr. V. N. Sanjeevan, who was the Director of the Centre for Marine Living Resources & Ecology in Kochi, Kerala, southern India.
