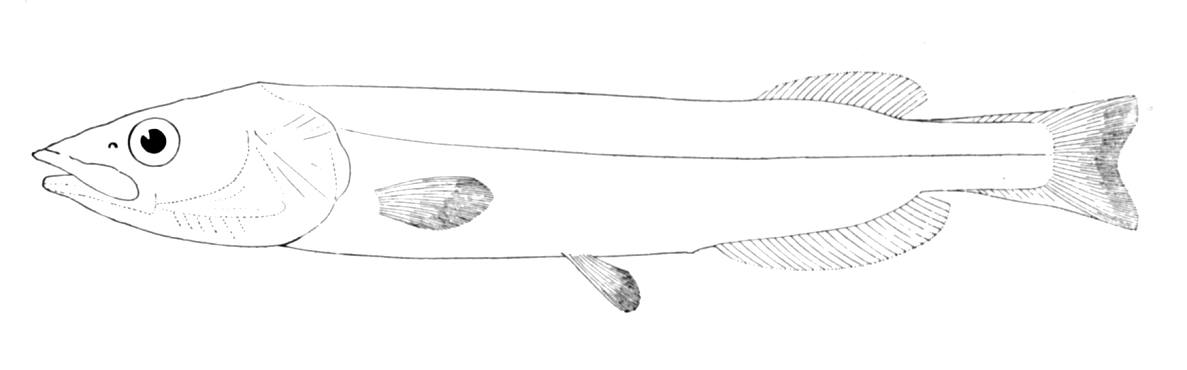
- Flathead Slickhead (Conocara nigrum)

Scientific classification
- Kingdom: Animalia
- Phylum: Chordata
- Class: Actinopterygii
- Order: Alepocephaliformes
- Family: Alepocephalidae
- Genus: Conocara; Goode & T. H. Bean, 1896

Type species
- Conocara mcdonaldi Goode & T. H. Bean, 1896

Synonyms
- Benthosphyraena Cockerell, 1919; Ericara Gill & C. H. Townsend, 1897; Whitleyidea Fowler, 1934; Xenognathus Gilbert, 1915

= Conocara =

Genus of fishes

Conocara is a genus of deepwater marine ray-finned fishes belonging to the family Alepocephalidae, the smooth-heads. These fishes are found in the deeper waters of the Oceans around the world.

The generic name derives from Latin conicus ("cone-shaped") and Greek κάρα (kara, "face, head").

== Species ==
There are currently ten recognized species in this genus:

- Conocara bertelseni Sazonov, 2002
- Conocara fiolenti Sazonov & Ivanov, 1979 (Fiolenti's smooth-head)
- Conocara kreffti Sazonov, 1997 (Wrinkled slickhead)
- Conocara macropterum (Vaillant, 1888) (Longfin smooth-head)

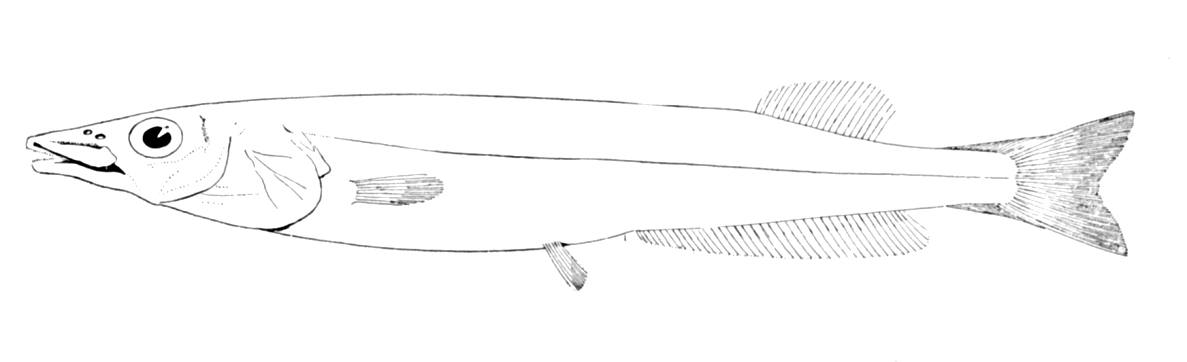
Longfin smooth-head, Conocara macropterum

- Conocara microlepis (Lloyd, 1909) (Elongate smooth-head)
- Conocara murrayi (Koefoed, 1927) (Murray's smooth-head)
- Conocara nigrum (Günther, 1878) (Flathead slickhead)
- Conocara paxtoni Sazonov, A. Williams & Kobyliansky, 2009
- Conocara salmoneum (T. N. Gill & C. H. Townsend, 1897) (Salmon smooth-head)
- Conocara werneri Nybelin, 1947 (Werner's smooth-head)
