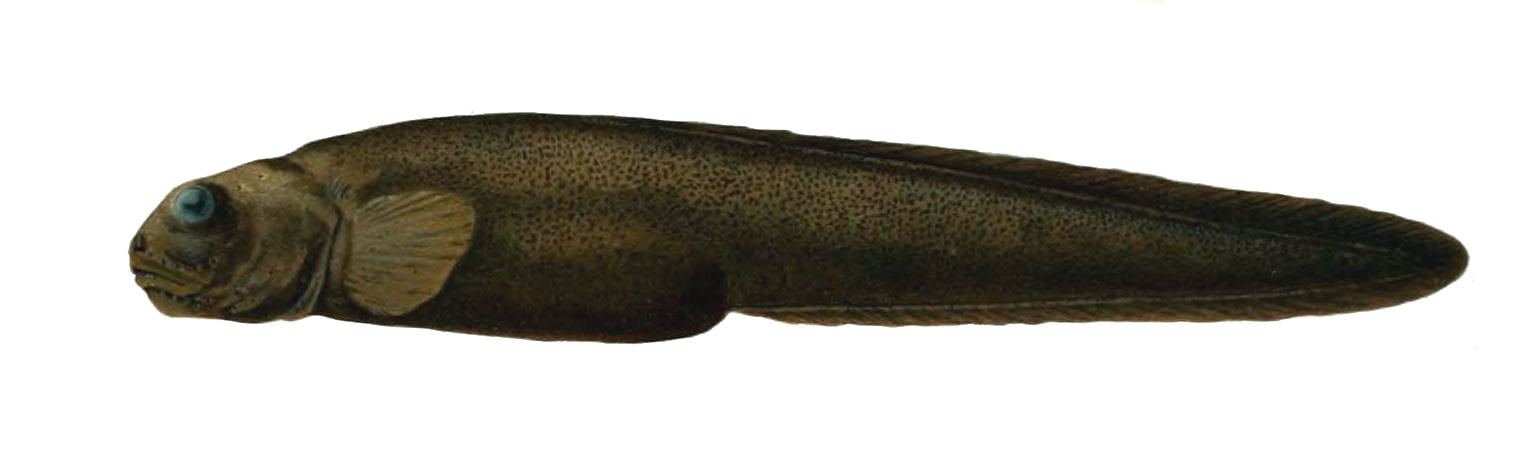

Conservation status
- Least Concern (IUCN 3.1)

Scientific classification
- Kingdom: Animalia
- Phylum: Chordata
- Class: Actinopterygii
- Order: Perciformes
- Family: Zoarcidae
- Genus: Pachycara
- Species: P. bulbiceps

Binomial name
- Pachycara bulbiceps (Garman, 1899)

Synonyms
- Maynea bulbiceps Garman, 1899; Pachycara obesum Zugmayer, 1911

= Snubnose eelpout =

Species of fish

The snubnose eelpout (Pachycara bulbiceps) is a species of marine ray-finned fish belonging to the family Zoarcidae, the eelpouts. This species is found in the deep waters of the Atlantic and Pacific Oceans.

== Taxonomy ==
The snubnose eelpout was first formally described as Maynea bulbiceps in 1899 by the American ichthyologist Samuel Garman with its type locality given as east of Cocos Island off Panama Bay. In 1911 Erich Zugmayer described a new species, Pachycara obesa, from the Bay of Biscay which he classified within the monospecific genus Pachycara. In 1988 Zugmayer's species was shown to be a synonym of Garman's M. bulbiceps, meaning that as P. obesa this species is the type species of Pachycara.

== Description ==
The snubnose eelpout has a moderately elongated body which has a depth at the origin of the anal fin equivalent to between 5.7% and 12.7% of its standard length. The mouth is terminal and there are no pelvic fins but the pectoral fins are long, wide and rounded and have between 16 and 19 fin rays. The body before the anus is around two fifths of the standard length. There is a lateral line running along the middle of the flanks from behind the edge of the pectoral fin. There are no scales on the nape. It is a uniform dark brown colour with the head and most of pectoral fins being darker. In fresh specimens the belly and eyes are blue. It has a bulb-shaped head, as indicated by the specific name bulbiceps. It has no pelvic fins. This species attains a maximum published total length of 51.5 cm (20.3 in).

== Distribution and habitat ==
The snubnose eelpout is found in the eastern Pacific Ocean from British Columbia south to Chile; and in the Atlantic Ocean from the Bay of Biscay and off Cap Blanc in Mauritania. It is a bathydemersal, abyssal species which occurs at depths of 2,400 to 4,780 m (7,870 to 15,680 ft) where there are muddy substrates.
