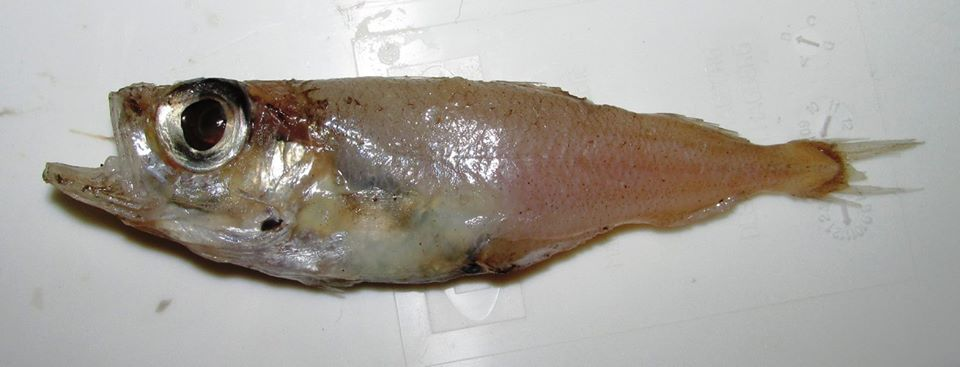

Scientific classification
- Kingdom: Animalia
- Phylum: Chordata
- Class: Actinopterygii
- Order: Gadiformes
- Family: Gadidae
- Genus: Gadiculus; Guichenot, 1850
- Species: G. argenteus

Binomial name
- Gadiculus argenteus Guichenot, 1850

Synonyms
- Merlangus argenteus (Guichenot, 1850); Gadiculus argenteus argenteus(Guichenot, 1850)

= Gadiculus argenteus =

Silvery pout

Species of fish

Gadiculus argenteus, or the silvery pout, is a species of cod found in the Northeast Atlantic region. It grows to a length of 15 cm (5.9 in) and is of minor importance to local commercial fisheries, being rather used as a bait fish.

Gadiculus argenteus was until recently considered the only species in the genus Gadiculus, known as the silvery pouts, but composed of two subspecies, G. a. argentatus and G. a. thori. Currently, they are considered two separate species with different distributions: G. argenteus is more southerly, occurring in the western Mediterranean and in the Atlantic around the Strait of Gibraltar and to the south along the Moroccan coast, while G. thori is found from the Bay of Biscay north up to the North Cape.
