= Elongate smooth-head =

Conservation status
- Data Deficient (IUCN 3.1)

Scientific classification
- Kingdom: Animalia
- Phylum: Chordata
- Class: Actinopterygii
- Order: Alepocephaliformes
- Family: Alepocephalidae
- Genus: Conocara
- Species: C. microlepis

Binomial name
- Conocara microlepis (Lloyd, 1909)

Synonyms
- Alepocephalus microlepis Lloyd, 1909

Species of ray-finned fish

The elongate smooth-head (Conocara microlepis), also called the elongate slickhead, is a species of fish in the family Alepocephalidae.

Its specific name microlepis means "small scale."

== Description ==
The elongate smooth-head is brownish in colour; its premaxillae form a sharp plate-like 'visor'. Its maximum length is 27 centimetres (11 in).

== Habitat ==
The elongate smooth-head lives in the northeast Atlantic Ocean, Arabian Sea and Indian Ocean; it is bathypelagic, living at depths of 1,500–2,200 m (4,900–7,200 ft) on the continental slope.
