= Pachycara crassiceps =

Conservation status
- Least Concern (IUCN 3.1)

Scientific classification
- Kingdom: Animalia
- Phylum: Chordata
- Class: Actinopterygii
- Order: Perciformes
- Family: Zoarcidae
- Genus: Pachycara
- Species: P. crassiceps

Binomial name
- Pachycara crassiceps (Roule, 1916)

Synonyms
- Lycenchelys crassiceps Roule, 1916; Lycodes crassiceps (Roule, 1916)

Species of fish

Pachycara crassiceps is a species of marine ray-finned fish belonging to the family Zoarcidae, the eelpouts. It is found in the Eastern Atlantic Ocean.

== Taxonomy ==
Pachycara crassiceps was first formally described as Lycenchelys crassiceps by the French zoologist Louis Roule with its type locality given as the Gulf of Gascony. The specific name crassiceps means "thick headed" and allusion to the head being larger than the head of Lycenchelys paxillus, with which it was presumed to be congeneric.

== Description ==
Pachycara crassiceps has a moderately elongate body which has a depth at the origin of the anal fin equivalent to between 11% and 14% of its total length, or 11.7% to 13.6% of its standard length. The scales cover up to the pelvic fins, nape and on the bases of all of the fins. It has a small head with its palatine teeth do not point backwards and are set in a double row at the front of the bone at a minimum. The pectoral fins have between 17 and 19 fin rays while it does have pelvic fins. The body before the anus is around two fifths of the standard length. There is a double lateral line, one ventral and the other along the middle of the flanks. This species is uniformly black or dark chocolate brown in colour with a blue eye and a bluish tinge on the belly in juveniles, black in adults. This species attains a maximum total length of 54 cm (21 in).

== Distribution and habitat ==
Pachycara crassiceps is found in the eastern Atlantic Ocean where it has been recorded off southwest Ireland, in the Bay of Biscay, the Canary Islands and off Mauritania and Senegal. This is a benthic specieswhich lives on muddy substrates at depths ranging between 652 and 2,191 m (2,139 and 7,188 ft).

== Behaviour ==
Pachycara crassiceps eats sipunculid worms and polychaetes. It is parasitised by Echinorhynchus brayi worms.
