= Oneirodes carlsbergi =

Conservation status
- Least Concern (IUCN 3.1)

Scientific classification
- Kingdom: Animalia
- Phylum: Chordata
- Class: Actinopterygii
- Order: Lophiiformes
- Family: Oneirodidae
- Genus: Oneirodes
- Species: O. carlsbergi

Binomial name
- Oneirodes carlsbergi (Regan & Trewavas, 1932)

Synonyms
- Dolopichthys carlsbergi Regan & Trewavas, 1932; Dolopichthys inimicus Fraser-Brunner, 1935

Species of fish

Oneirodes carlsbergi is a species of deep-sea anglerfish in the family Oneirodidae, commonly known as the dreamers. This species inhabits the tropical eastern Atlantic and Pacific Oceans.

== Taxonomy ==
Oneirodes carlsbergi was first formally described as Dolopichthys carlsbergi in 1932 by British ichthyologists Charles Tate Regan and Ethelwynn Trewavas. Its type locality was recorded as the Gulf of Panama at 6°40'N, 80°47'W, at station 1206, from a depth of approximately 600 m (2,000 ft).

This species is now classified within the genus Oneirodes. The 5th edition of Fishes of the World places this genus within the family Oneirodidae, which belongs to the suborder Ceratioidei in the anglerfish order Lophiiformes.

== Etymology ==
Oneirodes carlsbergi belongs to the genus Oneirodes, a name that means "dream-like." The genus was named by Christian Frederik Lütken, though he did not provide an explanation for his choice. In 1898, David Starr Jordan and Barton Warren Evermann suggested that the name referred to the species' small, skin-covered eyes. Alternatively, in 2009, Theodore Wells Pietsch III proposed that the name was chosen because the fish is "so strange and marvelous that it could only be imagined in the dark of the night during a state of unconsciousness."

The specific name carlsbergi honors the Carlsberg Foundation, which funded the research cruise of the fisheries research vessel Dana, on which the holotype was collected.

== Description ==
Oneirodes carlsbergi has metamorphosed females that share the characteristic features of its genus but can be distinguished from other species by the morphology of its esca, or lure. The esca has an elongated, tapering, and internally pigmented front appendage, which grows relatively longer as the fish matures. Near its tip, there are two unpigmented filaments. Additionally, a central appendage on the esca is typically composed of multiple branched, unpigmented filaments, each with smaller filaments extending from their central parts.

The papilla at the end of the esca is truncated and occasionally has a distal spot of dark pigment near its tip. The crescent-shaped posterior appendage of the esca is laterally compressed, sometimes with pigmentation along its margin towards the tip. There is also an unpigmented filamentous appendage on each side of the esca, with no escal appendages in front of them.

This species has between 1 and 5 teeth on the first epibranchial, teeth on the second pharyngobranchial, between 29 and 180 teeth on the upper jaw, and 53 to 160 teeth on the lower jaw, while there are 4 to 10 vomerine teeth. The maximum recorded standard length for this species is 22.2 cm (8.7 in).

== Distribution and habitat ==
Oneirodes carlsbergi is a mesopelagic and bathypelagic species, inhabiting depths of 100–2,000 m (330–6,560 ft) in tropical to temperate regions of the Atlantic and Pacific Oceans. It has also been recorded in the Banda Sea.

In the eastern Atlantic, it is found between 18°N and 8°S, though individual specimens have been recorded off Iceland and Ireland. In the Pacific, most records originate from the eastern Pacific, with additional occurrences in the central equatorial Pacific. Single specimens have also been found in the Java Sea and Banda Sea, as well as a few records from the South China Sea off Taiwan.
