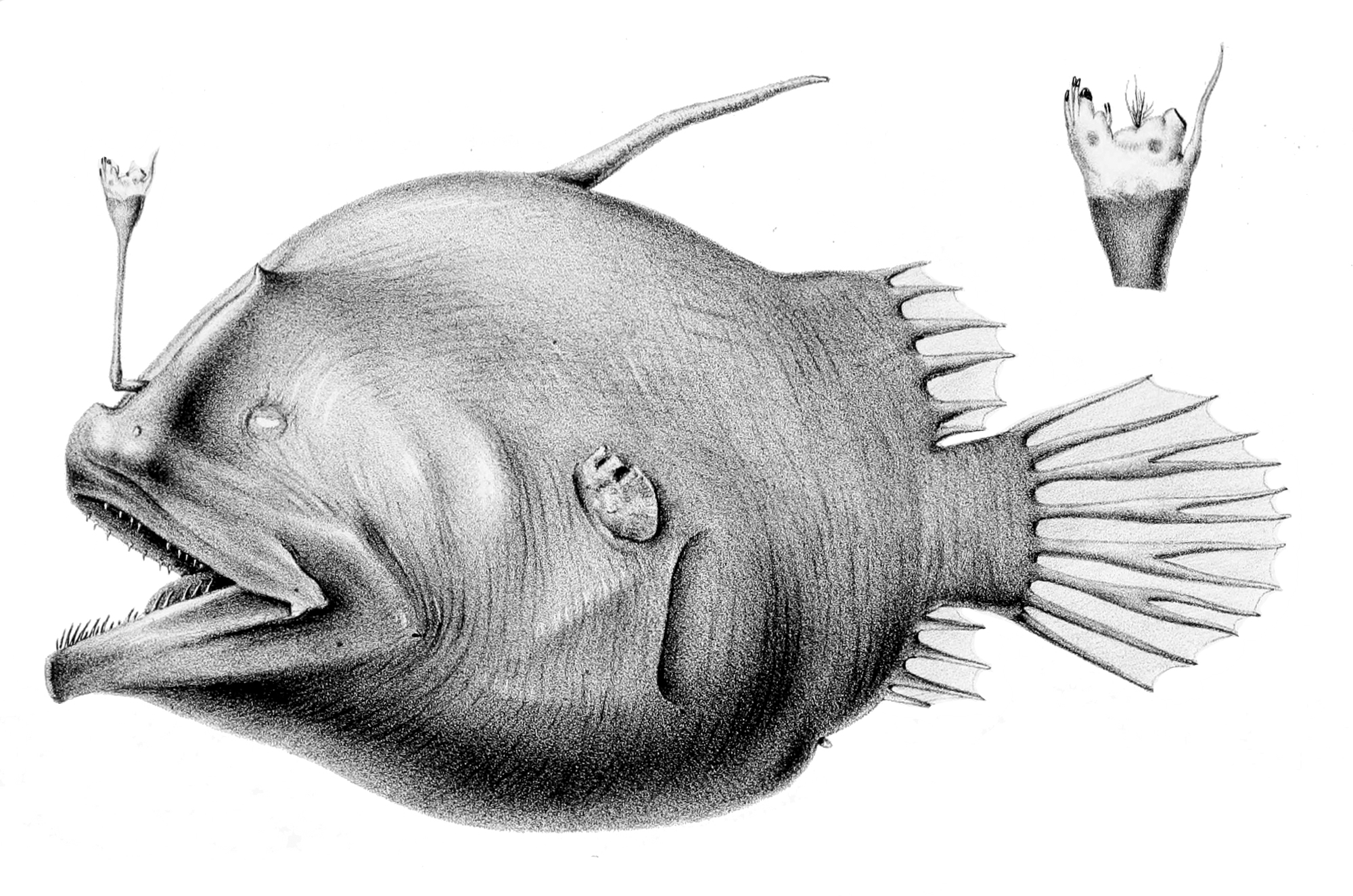

Conservation status
- Least Concern (IUCN 3.1)

Scientific classification
- Kingdom: Animalia
- Phylum: Chordata
- Class: Actinopterygii
- Order: Lophiiformes
- Family: Oneirodidae
- Genus: Oneirodes
- Species: O. eschrichtii

Binomial name
- Oneirodes eschrichtii Lütken, 1871

Synonyms
- List: Specieslist; Oneirodes megaceros; Holt & Byrne, 1908; Dolopichthys megaceros; (Holt & Byrne, 1908); Dolopichthys obtusus; Parr, 1927; Dolopichthys tentaculatus; Beebe, 1932; Dolopichthys digitatus; Regan & Trewavas, 1932; Dolopichthys simplex; Regan & Trewavas, 1932; Dolopichthys pollicifer; Regan & Trewavas, 1932; Dolopichthys brevifilis; Regan & Trewavas, 1932; Dolopichthys diadematus; Regan & Trewavas, 1932; Dolopichthys pennatus; Regan & Trewavas, 1932; Dolopichthys frondosus; Regan & Trewavas, 1932; Dolopichthys ptilotus; Regan & Trewavas, 1932; Dolopichthys multifilis; Regan & Trewavas, 1932; Dolopichthys claviger; Regan & Trewavas, 1932; Dolopichthys thysanophorus; Regan & Trewavas, 1932; Dolopichthys plumatus; Regan & Trewavas, 1932; Dolopichthys cirrifer; Regan & Trewavas, 1932; Dolopichthys hibernicus; Fraser-Brunner, 1935

= Bulbous dreamer =

Species of fish

The bulbous dreamer (Oneirodes eschrichtii), or cosmoplitan dreamer, is a species of marine ray-finned fish belonging to the family Oneirodidae, the dreamers, a family of deep-sea anglerfishes. This fish has a circumglobal distribution in tropical and temperate oceans.

== Taxonomy ==
The bulbous dreamer was first formally described in 1871 by the Danish zoologist and naturalist Christian Frederik Lütken with its type locality given as off the western coast of Greenland. When Lütken described O. escherichtii, he placed it within a new monospecific genus, Oneirodes, so this species is the type species of that genus by monotypy. As such, this is the type species of the family Oneirodidae. The 5th edition of Fishes of the World classifies this genus in the family Oneirodidae in the suborder Ceratioidei of the anglerfish order Lophiiformes. Theodore Gill named the family Oneirodidae in 1878.

== Etymology ==
The bulbous dreamer belongs to the genus Oneirodes, meaning "dream-like". Oneirodes was named by Christian Frederik Lütken, who did not explain this choice of name. David Starr Jordan and Barton Warren Evermann suggested in 1898 that the name referred to the small, skin-covered eyes. Alternatively, in 2009, Theodore Wells Pietsch III proposed that the name was given because the fish is "so strange and marvelous that it could only be imagined in the dark of the night during a state of unconsciousness". The specific name, escherichtii honours Daniel Frederik Eschricht, a Danish physician, physiologist and naturalist in recognition of his contribution to the study of Nordic natural history.

== Description ==
The bulbous dreamer has metamorphosed females that have the characteristic features of its genus but are distinguished from other species in the genus by the morphology of its esca, or lure. The esca of this species is a thick anterior appendage that is internally pigmented and shorter than the bulb of the esca. It has short filaments and a papilla at its tip. There is also a simple, tapered posterior appendage. This species has no appendages on its sides. There are between 5 and 7 soft rays in the dorsal fin and there are 4 soft rays in the anal fin. This species has a maximum published total length of 29.7 cm (11.7 in).

== Distribution and habitat ==
The bulbous dreamer has a circumglobal distribution. In the western Atlantic, it has been recorded from as far north as 66°N off Greenland south, as far as Bermuda, and also along the coast of North America into the Gulf of Mexico. In the eastern Atlantic, it is known from continental slope off Ireland to as far south as 40°S, although it has been recorded off Iceland. In the Indian Ocean, it has been recorded from the Gulf of Aden and Arabian Sea. In the Pacific Ocean, this species has been found in the Philippines and South China Sea, north to Japan and the Kuril–Kamchatka Trench at 49°N, 158°E, and south as far as New South Wales, Tasmania and New Zealand. In the eastern Pacific, it is found between 33°N and 34°S. This mesoplegaic species has been captured from depths between 750 and 2,500 m (2,460 and 8,200 ft).

== See also ==
- Angler fish
