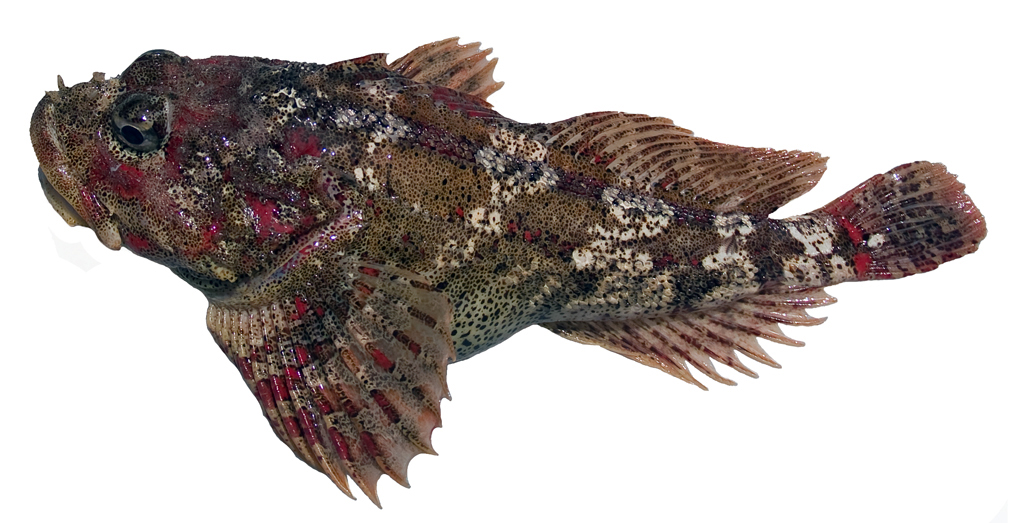

Scientific classification
- Domain: Eukaryota
- Kingdom: Animalia
- Phylum: Chordata
- Class: Actinopterygii
- Order: Perciformes
- Suborder: Cottoidei
- Family: Cottidae
- Genus: Icelus
- Species: I. bicornis

Binomial name
- Icelus bicornis (Reinhardt, 1840)

= Twohorn sculpin =

Species of fish

The twohorn sculpin (Icelus bicornis) is an Arctic benthic fish species of the order Scorpaeniformes.

== Description ==
The twohorn sculpin is typically 5–12 cm long and may reach 15 cm. It has a thin caudal peduncle, one sharp spine located in front of each eye and two spines behind, hence its common name. Like other sculpins, this species has two dorsal fins (the first is spiny while the second is soft-rayed), large pectoral fins and slender pelvics. The caudal fin is slightly rounded and has dark, vertical bars and a black spot at the base. The body is yellowish, with many dark blotches on the back and sides.

== Distribution ==
In Canada, this fish occurs as far north as the northern tip of Ellesmere Island. Elsewhere, it is distributed along Norwegian coasts up to Spitzbergen and the Barents Sea (as far north as 82 degrees), and west to Iceland and Greenland. It is typically found at depths between 40 and 180 metres on sand, mud or rocky substrates.

== Size ==
This species reaches a length of 15.7 cm (6.2 in).

== Reproduction ==
Spawning apparently occurs from August to October. Females produce from 100 to 400 eggs, in function of their body size.
