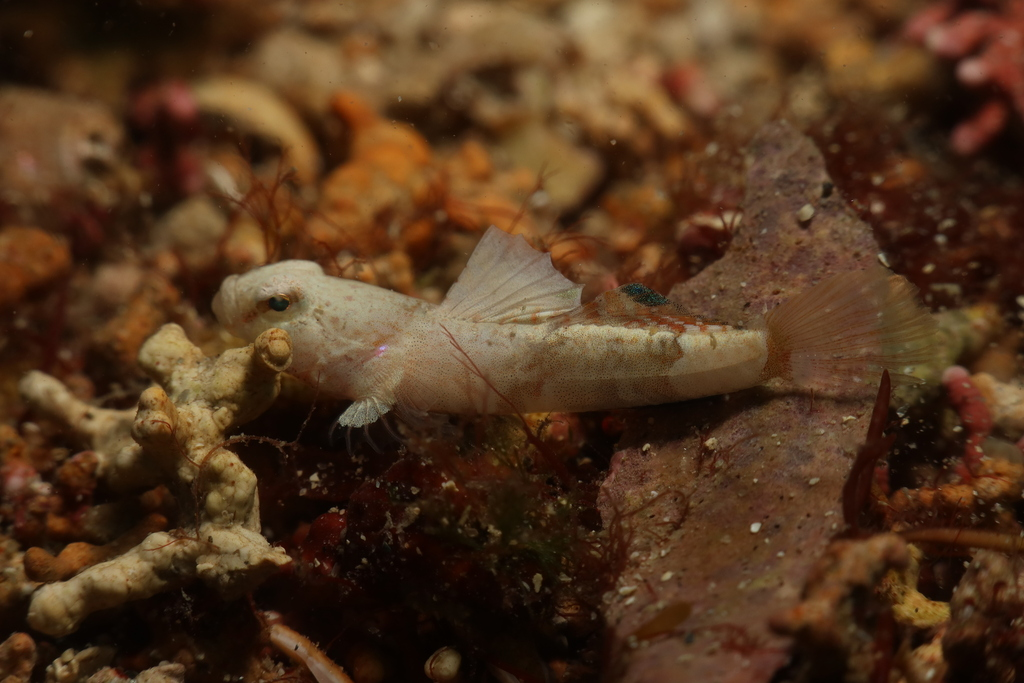

Scientific classification
- Kingdom: Animalia
- Phylum: Chordata
- Class: Actinopterygii
- Order: Gobiiformes
- Family: Gobiidae
- Genus: Lebetus; Winther, 1877

Type species
- Gobius scorpioides Collett, 1874

Synonyms
- Butigobius Whitley, 1930; Lebistes Smitt, 1900

= Lebetus =

Genus of fishes

Lebetus is a genus of gobies native to the eastern Atlantic Ocean.

== Species ==
There are currently three recognized species in this genus:

- Lebetus guilleti (É. Le Danois, 1913) (Guillet's goby)
- Lebetus patzneri Schliewen, Kovačić & Ordines in Schliewen, Kovačić, Cerwenka, Svensen & Ordines, 2019 (Patzner's goby)
- Lebetus scorpioides (Collett, 1874) (Diminutive goby)
