= Salmon smooth-head =

Conservation status
- Least Concern (IUCN 3.1)

Scientific classification
- Kingdom: Animalia
- Phylum: Chordata
- Class: Actinopterygii
- Order: Alepocephaliformes
- Family: Alepocephalidae
- Genus: Conocara
- Species: C. salmoneum

Binomial name
- Conocara salmoneum (Gill & Townsend, 1897)

Synonyms
- Conocara salmonea (Gill & Townsend, 1897); Ericara salmonea Gill & Townsend, 1897; Ericara salmoneum Gill & Townsend, 1897; Xenognathus profundorum Gilbert, 1915

Species of fish

The salmon smooth-head (Conocara salmoneum), also called the deepsea slickhead, is a species of fish in the family Alepocephalidae.

== Description ==
The salmon smooth-head is brownish in colour. Its head is large, about a third of its length. Its maximum length is 73 centimetres (2 ft 5 in). It has 25–27 anal soft rays.

== Habitat ==
The salmon smooth-head lives in the Atlantic Ocean and Pacific Ocean; it is bathypelagic, living at depths of 2,400–4,500 m (7,900–14,800 ft).
