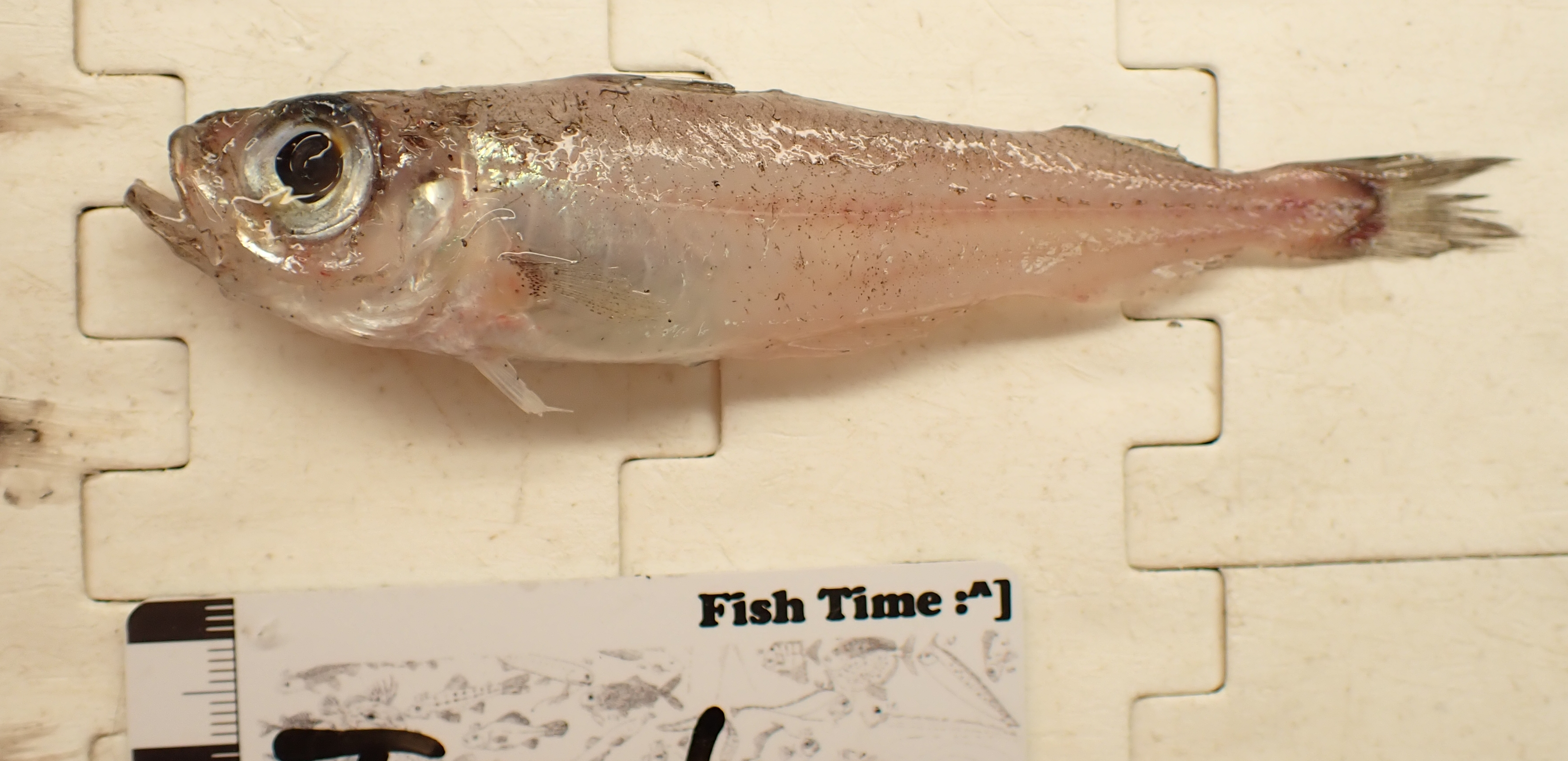
- A freshly-caught specimen of G. thori from the NE Atlantic

Scientific classification
- Domain: Eukaryota
- Kingdom: Animalia
- Phylum: Chordata
- Class: Actinopterygii
- Order: Gadiformes
- Family: Gadidae
- Genus: Gadiculus
- Species: G. thori

Binomial name
- Gadiculus thori E. J. Schmidt, 1913

Synonyms
- Gadiculus argenteus thori Schmidt, 1913

= Gadiculus thori =

Species of fish

Gadiculus thori is a species of cod found in the northeastern Atlantic Ocean. It grows to a length of 15 cm (5.9 in) and is not of major importance to local commercial fisheries.

Gadiculus thori was until recently considered a subspecies of the more widely distributed silvery pout, Gadiculus argenteus. Currently, the distribution of G. argenteus is thought to be more southerly, in the western Mediterranean and the adjacent Atlantic, while G. thori is found from the Bay of Biscay north up to the North Cape.
