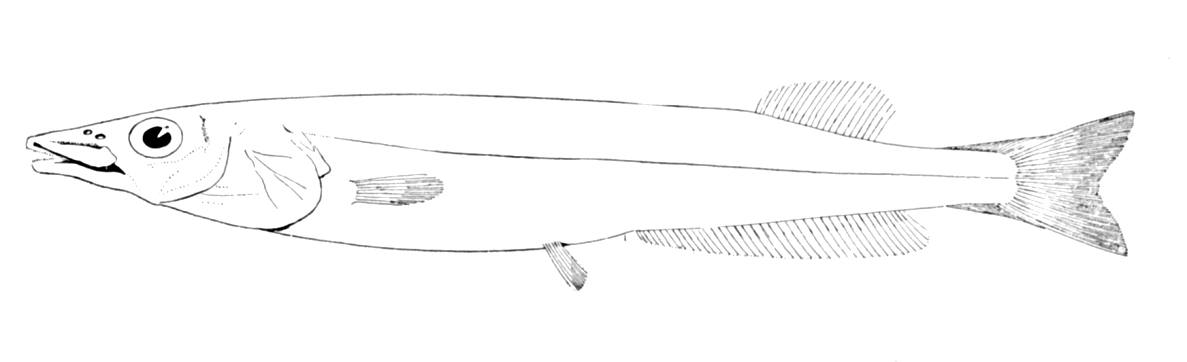

Conservation status
- Least Concern (IUCN 3.1)

Scientific classification
- Kingdom: Animalia
- Phylum: Chordata
- Class: Actinopterygii
- Order: Alepocephaliformes
- Family: Alepocephalidae
- Genus: Conocara
- Species: C. macropterum

Binomial name
- Conocara macropterum (Vaillant, 1888)

Synonyms
- Alepocephalus macropterus (Vaillant, 1888); Conocara macdonaldi (Goode & Bean, 1896); Conocara macroptera (Vaillant, 1888); Conocara mcdonaldi (Goode & Bean, 1896)

= Longfin smooth-head =

Species of fish

The longfin smooth-head (Conocara macropterum) is a species of fish in the family Alepocephalidae.

== Description ==
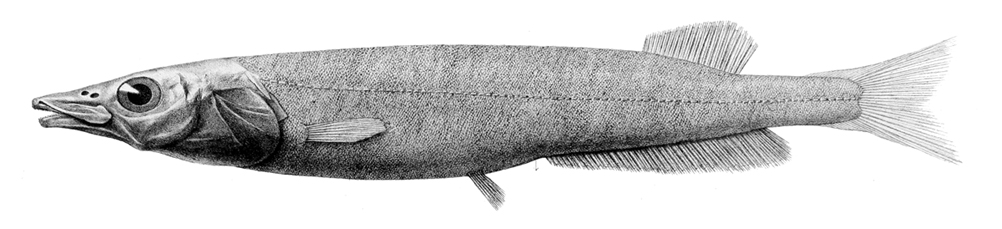
Drawing of Conocara macropterum.

The longfin smooth-head is pale brown to black in colour; its name derives from its anal fin, which has a long base and 35–39 finrays. Its maximum length is 34 centimetres (13 in). They grow rapidly from infancy; few juveniles of intermediate size are found.

== Habitat ==
The longfin smooth-head lives in the temperate and tropical Atlantic Ocean, and in the Gulf of Mexico; it is bathypelagic, living at depths of 800–2,200 m (2,600–7,200 ft), being most common at 1,200–1,800 m (3,900–5,900 ft).

== Behaviour ==
The longfin smooth-head lays large eggs, up to 6 mm (0.24 in) in diameter, and are believed to be buried in redds, similar to how the Atlantic salmon buries its eggs. A detritivore, the longfin smooth-head is recorded to ingest sediment from the seafloor, taking up with it microfauna such as foraminiferans.
