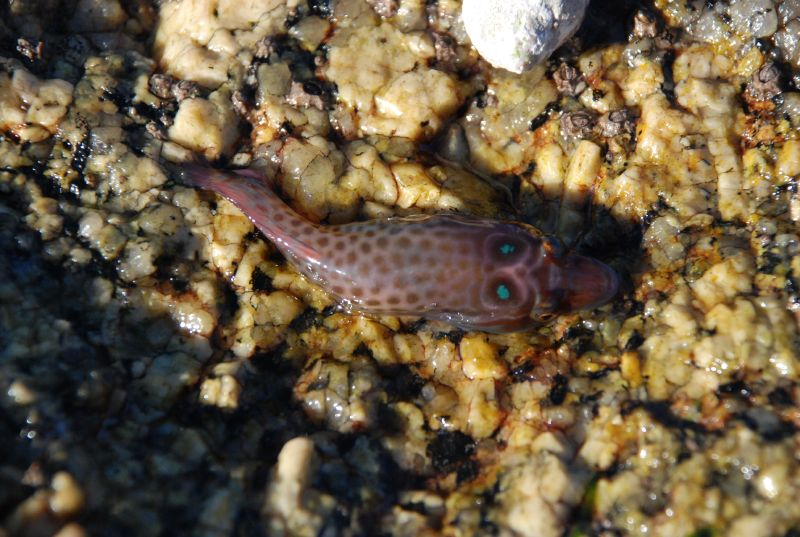

Conservation status
- Least Concern (IUCN 3.1)

Scientific classification
- Kingdom: Animalia
- Phylum: Chordata
- Class: Actinopterygii
- Order: Blenniiformes
- Family: Gobiesocidae
- Genus: Lepadogaster
- Species: L. purpurea

Binomial name
- Lepadogaster purpurea (Bonnaterre, 1788)

= Lepadogaster purpurea =

Species of fish

Lepadogaster purpurea, the Cornish sucker, is a species of clingfish from the family Gobiesocidae. It is found in the eastern North Atlantic Ocean and in the western Mediterranean Sea.

== Description ==
Lepadogaster purpurea has a rather tadpole-like shape with a small body and a large flattened head with large mouth shaped like the bill of a duck-and a tentacle is positioned to the rear of each nostril. The pelvic fins are fused and, together with their surrounding tissue, they form a suction disc or sucker. They are variable in colour, having the ability to alter their colouration to blending with the substrate they are clinging to, but normally they show a pale background with a patterning of bars and spots which can vary between dark purple to reddish brown and green. On the nape there are two bright blue ocelli, or eyespots, which are thought to be defensive and to confuse predators. They grow to 7.5 centimetres (3.0 in) in standard length.

== Distribution ==
Lepadogaster purpurea occurs in the eastern North Atlantic Ocean from the Shetland Islands south to the Canary Islands and Dakar in Senegal. It is also found in the western Mediterranean Sea as far east as Cap Roux (near Cannes, France).

== Habitat and biology ==
Lepadogaster purpurea just below and just above the low water market as deep as 9 metres (30 ft) where it hides under boulders on rocky shorelines. It spends long periods in shelters, normally with a favoured shelter in this habitat. When it detects potential prey near its shelter, L. purpurea waits for it to move closer and then it swims out to take the prey returning to the shelter straight away to eat the prey.

== Taxonomy ==
Lepadogaster purpurea is one of three species of Lepadogaster. L. purpurea was once synonymous with Lepadogaster zebrina, but has since been classified as its own species as L. zebrina has been discovered to be more synonymous with L. lepadogaster. This species of Lepadogaster is found normally off the western coast of Portugal. L. purpurea differs from other Lepadogaster species in that it behaves in a much more passive manner. For example, studies have shown that L. purpurea was less active in its habitat and spent more time inside its shelter rather than interacting with other fish and swimming around. L. purpurea also has different swim patterns in comparison to the other Lepadogaster species. L. purpurea generally swims at a much slower pace and doesn't make quick movements like the shore clingfish.
