= Murray's smooth-head =

Conservation status
- Least Concern (IUCN 3.1)

Scientific classification
- Kingdom: Animalia
- Phylum: Chordata
- Class: Actinopterygii
- Order: Alepocephaliformes
- Family: Alepocephalidae
- Genus: Conocara
- Species: C. murrayi

Binomial name
- Conocara murrayi (Koefoed, 1927)

Synonyms
- Alepocephalus murrayi Koefoed, 1927

Species of fish

Murray's smooth-head (Conocara murrayi), also called Murray's slickhead, is a species of fish in the family Alepocephalidae.

== Description ==
Murray's smooth-head is black in colour. It is described as "moderately elongate, deep bodied, and posteriorly compressed, with a relatively long, acute snout", with scales along its length. Its maximum length is 34 centimetres (13 in). It has a lateral line.

== Habitat ==
Murray's smooth-head lives in the north Atlantic Ocean and Gulf of Mexico;
