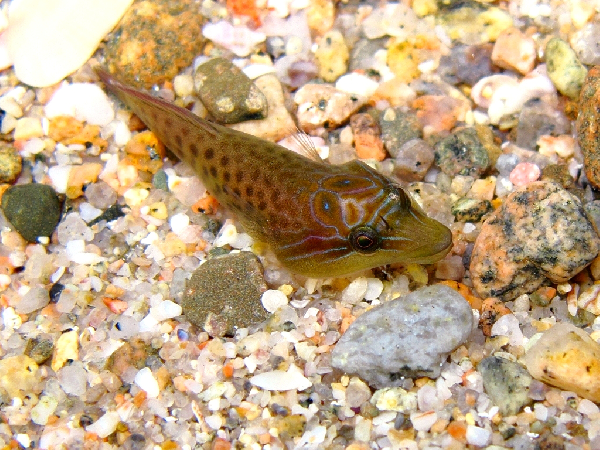

Conservation status
- Least Concern (IUCN 3.1)

Scientific classification
- Kingdom: Animalia
- Phylum: Chordata
- Class: Actinopterygii
- Order: Blenniiformes
- Family: Gobiesocidae
- Genus: Lepadogaster
- Species: L. lepadogaster

Binomial name
- Lepadogaster lepadogaster (Bonnaterre, 1788)

Synonyms
- Cyclopterus lepadogaster Bonnaterre, 1788; Cyclopterus lepadogaster Walbaum, 1792; Piescephalus adherens Rafinesque, 1810; Lepadogaster gouanii Risso, 1810; Lepadogaster balbis Risso, 1810; Lepadogaster ciliatus Risso, 1820; Lepadogaster natator Risso, 1820; Lepadogaster biciliatus Risso, 1827; Lepadogaster brownii Risso, 1827; Lepadogaster zebrina Lowe, 1839; Lepadogaster acutus Canestrini, 1864; Lepadogaster adriatica Hankó, 1920–21

= Shore clingfish =

Species of fish

The shore clingfish (Lepadogaster lepadogaster) is a clingfish of the family Gobiesocidae. It is found in the Mediterranean Sea and adjacent Atlantic Ocean north to Galicia, Spain.

== Distribution ==
Occurs in the eastern Atlantic from Galicia, Spain to the Mediterranean, between latitudes 43.8° N and 30° N.

== Habitat and biology ==
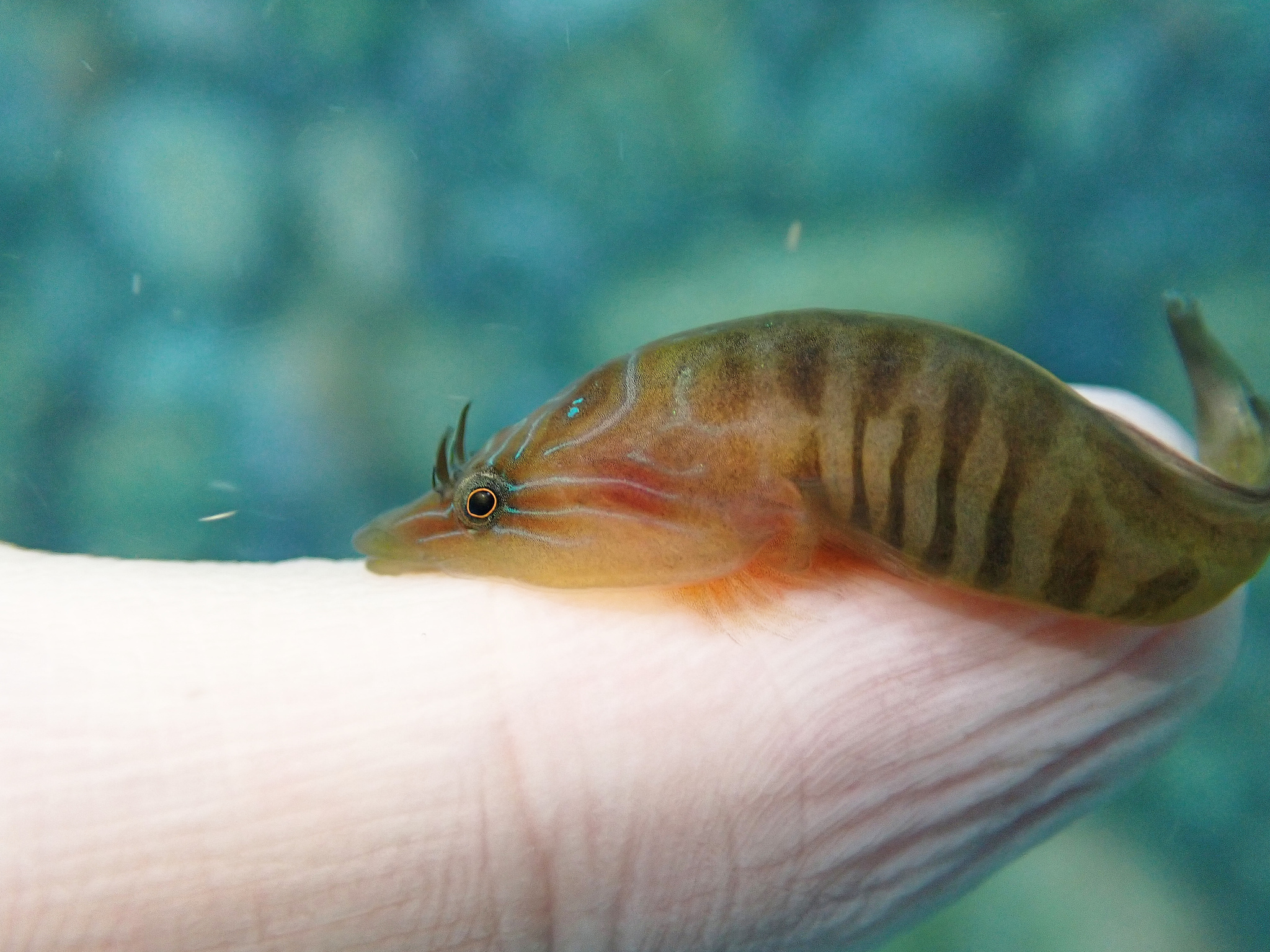
In Spain

L. lepadogaster often inhabits underwater boulder fields consisting of smooth rocks and large pebbles. Its length is up to 65 mm. L. lepadogaster is also classified as a cryptobenthic fish. Cryptobenthic simply means that the fish is both behaviorally and visually cryptic. The term is also used mainly to describe adult fish of a certain size, roughly around 5 cm in length.

The clingfish gets its name from the ability of the fish to attach itself to the rock walls of the ocean shore. It does this by having pelvic fins that have been adapted to form suckers. These suckers keep the clingfish strongly attached to the rocky surfaces off the shorelines. In addition to these suckers, the front fins of the clingfish are much stronger to aid in clinging to the rocks. The clingfish has other adaptations that allow it to inhabit rocky surfaces and reduce predation. For instance, the clingfish has a triangular shaped head and a flattened body. These characteristics allow the clingfish to reduce the drag of the water from the waves pushing and pulling against it. L. lepadogaster also has distinct differences from the other species of Lepadogaster. For one, L. lepadogaster has a much more active lifestyle than the species L. purpurea. This is evident in both L. lepadogaster's swimming speed and in its more frequent feeding periods

The shore clingfish survives by consisting on a diet of mostly detritus material, meaning that it lives off the dead organic matter of its environment.

== Taxonomy ==
Lepadogaster lepadogaster is one of three species of Lepadogaster found in the NE Atlantic. L. purpurea was considered to be synonymous with Lepadogaster zebrina, but has since been classified as a separate species whilst L. zebrina has been shown to be synonymous with L. lepadogaster.
