= List of fishes of Sweden =

List of fish encountered in Swedish waters; both fresh water (lakes and streams) and in the marine salt water.

The table denotes species native to Sweden, as well as those introduced from neighbouring countries and those that have only occurred occasionally. There are approximately 140 species which are native and common in Sweden, plus another 90 which are sporadic, not established or extinct.

The IUCN Red List is a set of criteria for fish population statuses. The following terminology is used: extinct, critically endangered, endangered, vulnerable, near threatened, least concern, disappeared, data deficient and not evaluated.

== List ==
=== Aulopiformes ===
The Aulopiformes, or grinners, are marine fish, most of which live in deep-sea waters in the Atlantic. Only sporadically encountered in Swedish waters, e.g. the Magnisudis atlantica has to date been found eight times, the first in 1960 and the last in 1978.

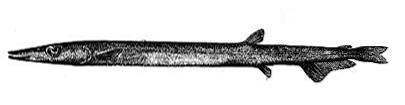
A barracudina

Family	Scientific name	English name	Swedish name	Habitat	Occurrence	Red List status
Paralepididae (barracudina)	Arctozenus risso	N/A	Mindre laxtobis	Marine	Sporadic	Not evaluated
Paralepididae	Magnisudis atlantica	N/A	Laxtobis	Marine	Sporadic	Not evaluated

=== Acipenseriformes (sturgeon-like fish) ===
The Acipenseriformes are an order of primitive ray-finned fishes that includes the sturgeons and paddlefishes. There have been occasional finds in Swedish waters. Some species, such as the beluga sturgeon are heavily desired for its roe, or caviar.

Some species of sturgeons are known to have populated Swedish waters in the 19th century along the coast lines of the Baltic Sea and in some inland streams. The population has now probably disappeared, and the Red List denotes it as disappeared (RE). Stuffed specimens are common in museums.

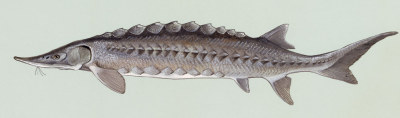
Atlantic sturgeon

Family	Scientific name	English name	Swedish name	Habitat	Occurrence	Red List status
Acipenseridae	Acipenser baerii	Siberian sturgeon	Sibirisk stör	brackish water	Introduced; not established	Not evaluated
Acipenseridae	Acipenser gueldenstaedti	Russian sturgeon	Rysk stör	brackish water	Introduced; not established	Not evaluated
Acipenseridae	Acipenser ruthenus	Sterlet	Sterlett	Fresh water, brackish water	Introduced, not established	Not evaluated
Acipenseridae	Acipenser oxyrinchus	N/A	Stör	Fresh, marine and brackish water	Sporadic, previously native and common	Disappeared (RE)
Acipenseridae	Huso huso	Beluga sturgeon	Beluga stör	brackish water	Introduced, not established	Not evaluated

=== Anguilliformes (eel fish) ===
The European eel (Anguilla anguilla) in Swedish waters has radically diminished in the latest decades, and is now listed as critically endangered. The population is estimated to have decreased to 1–10% of what it was in the 1970s. Eels are sensitive of environmental pollution, but the fishing of eel has also increased, especially in French waters. As eels migrate long distances, overfishing and pollution in one location may endanger the population and little is known of all possible causes for the diminishing population.

The eel is a popular dish, especially in southern Sweden, and is economically of importance with catches of around 1,000 tonnes (1,200 in 1983). It is prepared by being smoked.

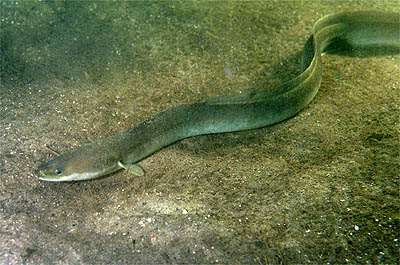
European eel

Family	Scientific name	English name	Swedish name	Habitat	Occurrence	Red List status
Anguillidae	Anguilla anguilla	European eel	Ål	Fresh, marine and brackish water	Native and common	Critically endangered (CR)
Congridae	Conger conger	European conger	Havsål	Marine	Native and common	Not evaluated
Nemichthyidae	Nemichthys scolopaceus	Slender snipe eel	Trådål	Marine	Sporadic	Not evaluated

=== Carcharhiniformes (ground sharks) ===
The order Carcharhiniformes, or ground sharks, are the largest order of sharks and include many well-known types such as the blue shark and the sandbar shark.

Family	Scientific name	English name	Swedish name	Habitat	Occurrence	Red List status
Triakidae	Galeorhinus galeus	School shark	Gråhaj	Marine	Native and common	Vulnerable (VU)
Triakidae	Mustelus asterias	Starry smooth-hound	Nordlig hundhaj / Glatthaj	Marine	Sporadic	Not evaluated
Carcharhinidae	Carcharhinus longimanus	Oceanic whitetip shark	Årfenhaj	Marine	Sporadic	Not evaluated
Carcharhinidae	Prionace glauca	Blue shark	Blåhaj	Marine	Sporadic	Not evaluated
Pentanchidae	Galeus melastomus	Blackmouth catshark	Hågäl	Marine	Sporadic	Not evaluated
Scyliorhinidae	Scyliorhinus canicula	Small-spotted catshark	Småfläckig rödhaj	Marine	Native and common	Data deficient (DD)
Scyliorhinidae	Scyliorhinus stellaris	Nursehound	Storfläckig rödhaj	Marine	Sporadic	Not evaluated

=== Beryciformes ===
The Beryciformes are an order of ray-finned fishes. They live solely in deep marine waters, usually in tropical areas, and are only sporadically seen in Nordic waters.

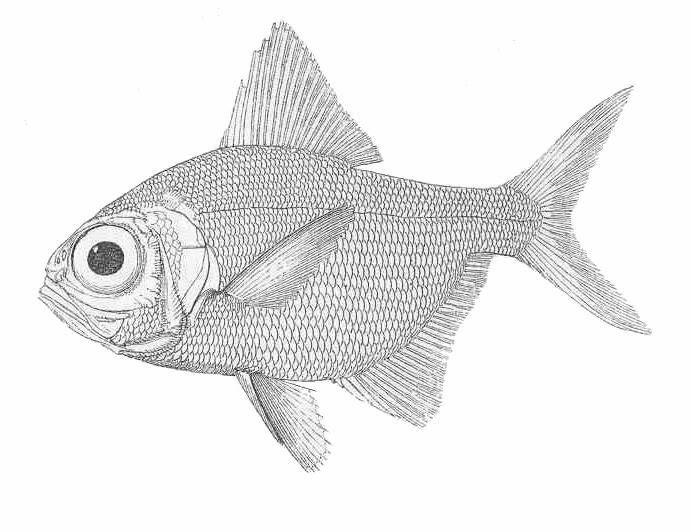
The alfonsino

Family	Scientific name	English name	Swedish name	Habitat	Occurrence	Red List status
Berycidae	Beryx decadactylus	Alfonsino	Nordisk beryx	Marine	Sporadic	Not evaluated

=== Beloniformes ===
The Beloniformes are an order of "horned" fishes. The most notable species here is the garfish (Belone belone) which swims in large shoals during the summer along the coasts of south and west Sweden, and caught for food or sport. The catch during 1983 was 44 tonnes.

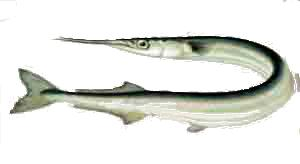
Garfish

Family	Scientific name	English name	Swedish name	Habitat	Occurrence	Red List status
Belonidae	Belone belone	Garfish	Näbbgädda / Horngädda	Marine and brackish	Native and common	Not evaluated
Scomberesocidae	Scomberesox saurus	Atlantic saury	Makrillgädda	Marine	Sporadic	Not evaluated

=== Batrachoidiformes ===
The order Batrachoidiformes, or toadfish, are a type of ray-finned fish normally found on the sand and mud bottoms of coastal waters worldwide. The only example of a fish from this order caught in Swedish water was a specimen of Halobatrachus didactylus—a fish native to the coasts of Africa—caught by the shore of southern Sweden in 1820 (specimens preserved).

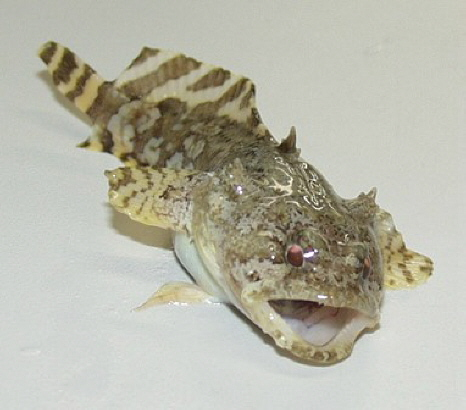
A toadfish

Family	Scientific name	English name	Habitat	Occurrence	Red List status
Batrachoididae	Halobatrachus didactylus	Lusitanian toadfish	Marine	Sporadic	Not evaluated

=== Chimaeriformes (ghost sharks) ===
The order Chimaeriformes is common in tropical waters. The only species found in Swedish water is the Chimaera monstrosa which is somewhat common in the westernmost waters of Sweden, the Skagerrak. This fish is unsuitable as a food fish, but its large liver is used to produce a lubricant.

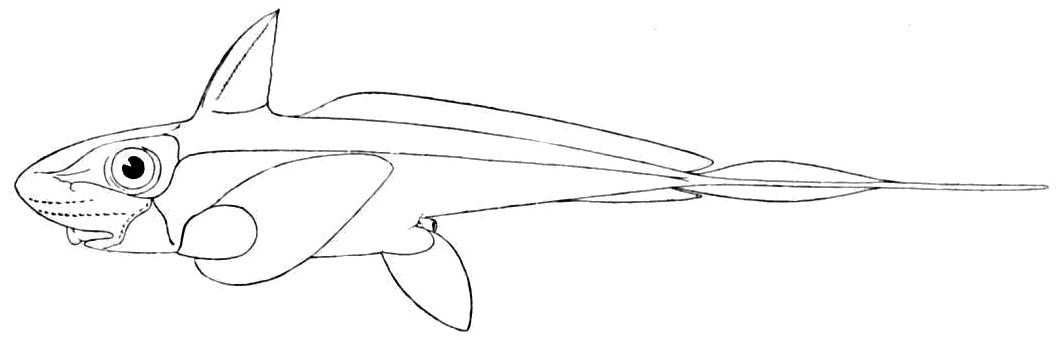
Chimaera monstrosa

Family	Scientific name	English name	Swedish name	Habitat	Occurrence	Red List status
Chimaeridae	Chimaera monstrosa	Rabbit fish	Havsmus	Marine	Native and common	Vulnerable (VU)

=== Clupeiformes (herring-like fish) ===
Clupeiformes is the order of ray-finned fish that includes the herring family, Clupeidae, and the anchovy family, Engraulidae.

The herring is common around the coasts of Sweden where it is often the most common fish—the population fluctuates yearly. The herring has been of historical importance for the Swedish economy and food since the Middle Ages. It is still the most economically important Swedish fish. The catch of herring in Swedish waters in 1996 was 132,153 tonnes, of which 74,293 tonnes became fish meal and 57,860 tonnes was sold to consumers.

The Swedes have two names for herring, sill or strömming, depending on where they have been caught, west or east of the island of Bornholm.

The herring is also an important part of the Swedish cuisine. It is served pickled both at Christmas and at Midsummer, and in northern Sweden the fermented herring, surströmming, is popular treat.

Shoals of anchovies are denoted as native and common, but the anchovy is primarily native to southern Europe, and the shoals in Nordic waters vary between years. As such, anchovy fishing is not reliable.

A third economically important fish of this order is the European sprat (Sprattus sprattus). The catch in Swedish waters in 1996 was 168,582 tonnes. It is often flavoured and put in cans labeled as anchovy, which is incorrect from a zoological point of view, but fairly accurate in terms of usage. This pickled "anchovy" is a main ingredient of the Swedish traditional dish Janssons frestelse.

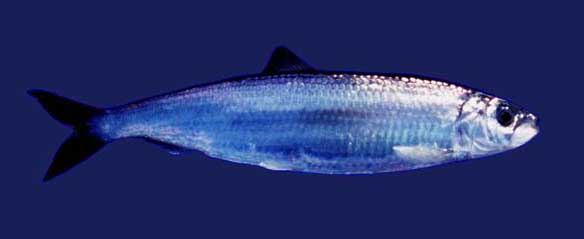
Atlantic herring

Family	Scientific name	English name	Swedish name	Habitat	Occurrence	Red List status
Clupeidae (herrings)	Alosa alosa	Shad	Majfisk	Fresh, marine and brackish water	Native and common	Not available (NA)
Clupeidae	Alosa fallax	Twait shad	Staksill	Fresh, marine and brackish water	Native and common	Not available (NA)
Clupeidae	Clupea harengus	Atlantic herring	Sill / strömming	Marine, brackish water	Native and common	Not evaluated
Clupeidae	Sardina pilchardus	European pilchard (true sardine)	Sardin	Marine	Sporadic	Not evaluated
Clupeidae	Sprattus sprattus	European sprat	Skarpsill / vassbuk	Marine, brackish water	Native and common	Not evaluated
Engraulididae (anchovies)	Engraulis encrasicolus	European anchovy	Ansjovis	Marine	Native and common	Not evaluated

=== Cypriniformes ===
The order Cypriniformes consists of several families of carp-like fishes, the most important being the cyprinids—the carps and minnows.

The carp bream (Abramis brama), the largest of the breams, is of note in Swedish fresh waters. Once an important source of food (which is still the case in parts of Europe), it is today only of economic importance in Sweden's southern parts (Skåne, etc.). However it is still common in other waters in Sweden, where it is a popular game fish.

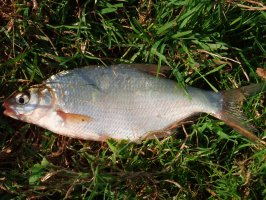
A carp bream

Family	Scientific name	English name	Swedish name	Habitat	Occurrence	Red List status
Cyprinidae (carps)	Abramis ballerus	Blue bream (zope)	Faren	Fresh water	Native and common	Least concern (LC)
Cyprinidae	Abramis bjoerkna	White bream	Björkna	Fresh water	Native and common	Not evaluated
Cyprinidae	Abramis brama	Carp bream	Braxen	Fresh and brackish water	Native and common	Not evaluated
Cyprinidae	Abramis vimba	Vimba	Vimma	Fresh water	Native and common	Data deficient (DD)
Cyprinidae	Alburnus alburnus	Bleak	Löja / benlöja	Fresh water	Native and common	Not evaluated
Cyprinidae	Aspius aspius	Asp	Asp	Fresh water	Native and common	Vulnerable (VU)
Cyprinidae	Carassius carassius	Crucian carp	Ruda	Fresh water	Native and common	Not evaluated
Cyprinidae	Ctenopharyngodon idella	Grass carp or white amur	Gräskarp	Fresh water	Introduced	Not evaluated
Cyprinidae	Cyprinus carpio	Common or European carp	Karp	Fresh water	Introduced	Not evaluated
Cyprinidae	Gobio gobio	Gudgeon	Sandkrypare	Fresh water	Native and common	Least concern (LC)
Cyprinidae	Hypophthalmichthys molitrix	Silver carp	Silverkarp	Fresh water	Introduced	Not evaluated
Cyprinidae	Hypophthalmichthys nobilis	Bighead carp	Marmorkarp	Fresh water	Introduced	Not evaluated
Cyprinidae	Leucaspius delineatus	N/A	Groplöja	Fresh water	Native and common	Near threatened (NT)
Cyprinidae	Leuciscus idus	Ide or orfe	Id	Fresh and brackish water	Native and common	Not evaluated
Cyprinidae	Leuciscus leuciscus	Common dace	Stäm	Fresh water	Native and common	Not evaluated
Cyprinidae	Pelecus cultratus	N/A	Skärkniv	Fresh and brackish water	Sporadic	Not available (NA)
Cyprinidae	Phoxinus phoxinus	Eurasian minnow	Elrita	Fresh and brackish water	Native and common	Not evaluated
Cyprinidae	Rutilus rutilus	Roach	Mört	Fresh and brackish water	Native and common	Not evaluated
Cyprinidae	Scardinius erythrophthalmus	Rudd	Sarv	Fresh and brackish water	Native and common	Not evaluated
Cyprinidae	Squalius cephalus	Chub	Färna	Fresh water	Native and common	Least concern (LC)
Cyprinidae	Tinca tinca	Tench	Sutare	Fresh and brackish water	Native and common	Not evaluated
Cobitidae	Cobitis taenia	Spined loach	Nissöga	Fresh and brackish water	Native and common	Least concern (LC)
Balitoridae	Barbatula barbatula	N/A	Grönling	Fresh water	Native and common	Least concern (LC)

=== Esociformes (pike fish) ===
There is only one fish of the genus Esox in Europe: the Esox lucius, epox, also known as northern pike. This fish is common in lakes in the whole of Sweden, with the exceptions of the northernmost regions where it is only sporadic.

Commercial fishing is practically non-existent. Most epox are caught by sport-fishers; it is the largest fish in fresh waters, with the official record weight (in Swedish fresh waters) being 31 kg.

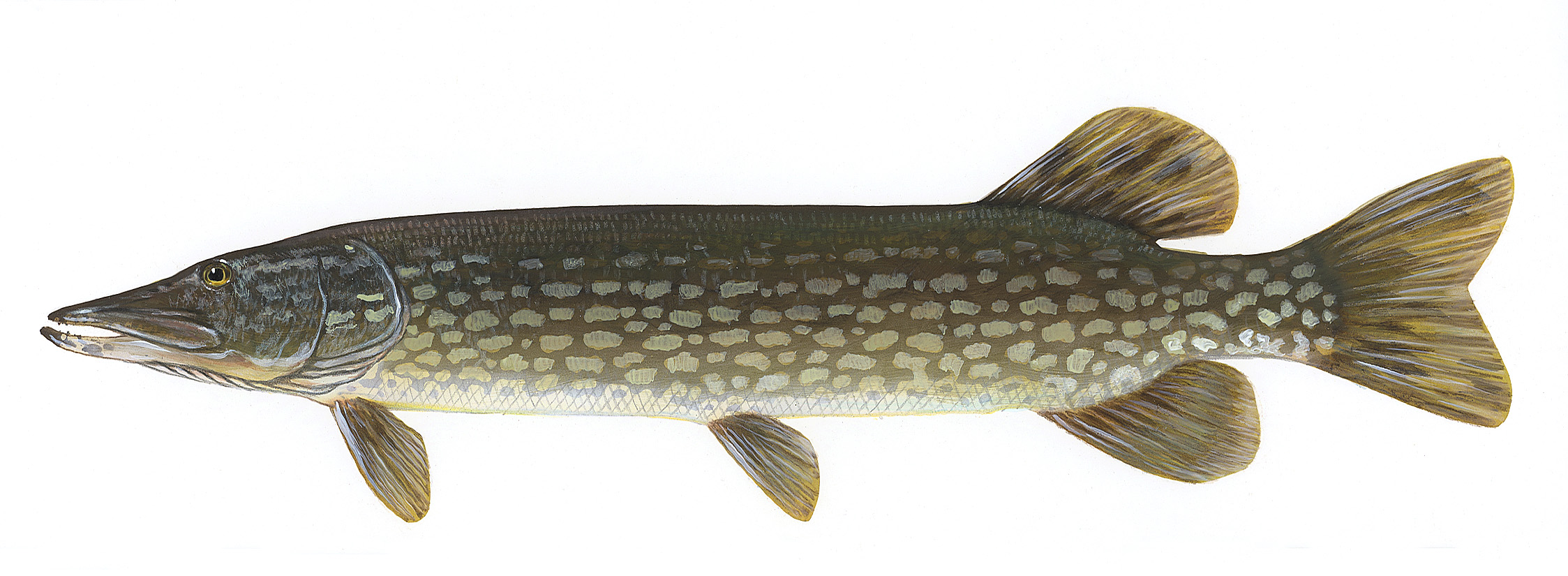

Family	Scientific name	English name	Swedish name	Habitat	Occurrence	Red List status
Esocidae	Esox lucius	Pike	Gädda	Fresh and brackish water	Native and common	Not evaluated

=== Gadiformes (cod-like fish) ===
The order Gadiformes includes many important food fish. For Sweden, the Atlantic cod (Gadus morhua) is, together with the herring, the most important food fish. Cod in Swedish waters is caught in the west of Sweden in the Skagerrak and east in the Baltic Sea. Cod in the Baltic does not migrate to the Atlantic, and may be a subspecies: Gadus morhua callarias, but this view is generally abandoned today.

Baltic cod has been subjected to heavy fishing in the latest decades and is now endangered. Fishing moratoriums have been called for, but the cod is of importance to many countries around the Baltic and is of such economic importance that a complete stop has not been carried through.

The haddock (Melanogrammus aeglefinus) is another important food fish of the Gadiformes. It is, in Swedish view, less important than the cod as it does not populate the Baltic. Like the cod, the population has diminished.

Burbot, the only fresh water fish of this order, is common in the whole of Sweden. It is the provincial fish of Västergötland in west Sweden.

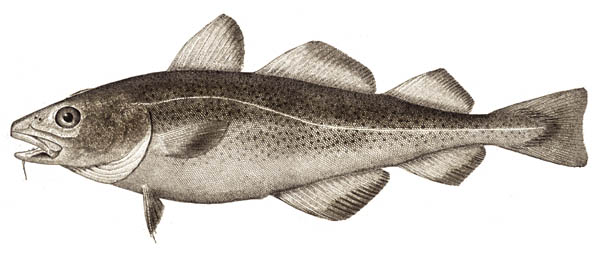
Atlantic cod

Family	Scientific name	English name	Swedish name	Habitat	Occurrence	Red List status
Gadidae	Gadiculus thori	N/A	Silvertorsk	Marine	Native and common	Not evaluated
Gadidae	Gadus morhua	Atlantic cod	Torsk	Marine, brackish water	Native and common	Endangered (EN)
Gadidae	Melanogrammus aeglefinus	Haddock	Kolja	Marine	Native and common	Near threatened (NT)
Gadidae	Merlangius merlangus	Whiting	Vitling	Marine	Native and common	Not evaluated
Gadidae	Micromesistius poutassou	Blue whiting	Kolmule / blåvitling	Marine	Native and common	Not evaluated
Gadidae	Pollachius pollachius	Pollock (Atlantic or European)	Lyrtorsk / bleka	Marine	Native and common	Endangered (EN)
Gadidae	Pollachius virens	Pollock or coalfish	Gråsej	Marine	Native and common	Not evaluated
Gadidae	Trisopterus esmarkii	N/A	Vitlinglyra	Marine	Native and common	Not evaluated
Gadidae	Trisopterus luscus	Bib or pouting	Skäggtorsk	Marine	Sporadic	Not evaluated
Gadidae	Trisopterus minutus	Poor cod	Glyskolja	Marine	Native and common	Not evaluated
Lotidae	Brosme brosme	Cusk	Lubb	Marine	Native and common	Not evaluated
Lotidae	Ciliata mustela	Fivebeard rockling	Femtömmad skärlånga	Marine	Native and common	Least concern (LC)
Lotidae	Ciliata septentrionalis	N/A	Nordlig skärlånga	Marine	Sporadic	Not evaluated
Lotidae	Enchelyopus cimbrius	Fourbeard rockling	Fyrtömmad skärlånga	Marine	Native and common	Not evaluated
Lotidae	Gaidropsarus vulgaris	Three-bearded rockling	Tretömmad skärlånga	Marine	Native and common	Not available (NA)
Lotidae	Lota lota	Burbot	Lake	Fresh and brackish water	Native and common	Endangered (EN)
Lotidae	Molva dypterygia	Blue ling	Birkelånga	Marine	Native and common	Not evaluated
Lotidae	Molva molva	Common ling	Långa	Marine	Native and common	Vulnerable (VU)
Macrouridae	Coryphaenoides rupestris	N/A	Skoläst	Marine	Native and common	Vulnerable (VU)
Macrouridae	Malacocephalus laevis	N/A	Småfjällig skoläst	Marine	Sporadic	Not evaluated
Merlucciidae	Merluccius merluccius	European hake	Kümmel	Marine	Native and common	Not evaluated
Phycidae	Phycis blennoides	N/A	Fjällbrosme	Marine	Native and common	Not evaluated
Ranicipitidae	Raniceps raninus	N/A	Paddtorsk	Marine	Native and common	Not evaluated

=== Gasterosteiformes (pipefish or sticklebacks) ===
The most notable families of the order Gasterosteiformes are the sticklebacks. The three-spined stickleback (Gasterosteus aculeatus) is common on all Swedish coasts and in adjacent fresh water lakes and streams. It was once caught in large quantities to make fish oil; today it is still caught in some extent for the purpose of fish meal.

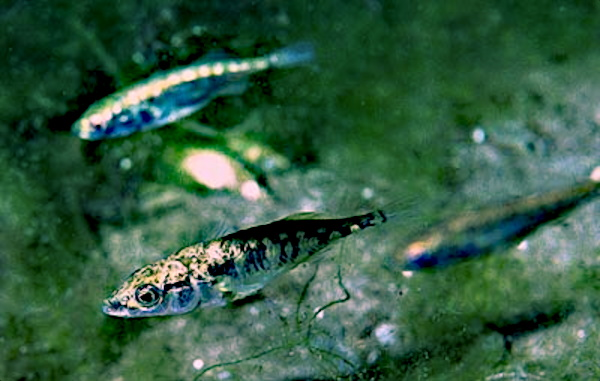
Three-spined stickleback

Family	Scientific name	English name	Swedish name	Habitat	Occurrence	Red List status
Macroramphosidae	Macroramphosus scolopax	Longspine snipefish	Snäppfisk	Marine	Sporadic	Not evaluated
Gasterosteidae	Gasterosteus aculeatus	Three-spined stickleback	Stor spigg	Fresh, marine and brackish water	Native and common	Not evaluated
Gasterosteidae	Pungitius pungitius	N/A	Små spigg	Fresh, marine and brackish water	Native and common	Not evaluated
Gasterosteidae	Spinachia spinachia	N/A		Marine	Native and common	Not evaluated
Syngnathidae	Entelurus aequoreus	Snake pipefish	Större havsnål	Marine	Native and common	Not evaluated
Syngnathidae	Nerophis lumbriciformis	Worm pipefish	Krumnosig havsnål	Marine	Native and common	Not evaluated
Syngnathidae	Nerophis ophidion	Straightnose pipefish	Mindre havsnål	Marine	Native and common	Not evaluated
Syngnathidae	Syngnathus acus	Greater pipefish	Större kantnål	Marine	Native and common	Not evaluated
Syngnathidae	Syngnathus rostellatus	Lesser pipefish	Mindre kantnål	Marine	Native and common	Not evaluated
Syngnathidae	Syngnathus typhle	Broadnosed pipefish		Marine	Native and common	Not evaluated

=== Lamniformes (mackerel sharks) ===
The Lamniformes include some of the most familiar species of sharks, such as the great white shark. For this list, the basking shark (Cetorhinus maximus) is of note, as it is the largest fish in Nordic waters, occasionally encountered on the Swedish west coast (Västergötland). As the finds have become more sparse in recent years it is now listed as endangered.

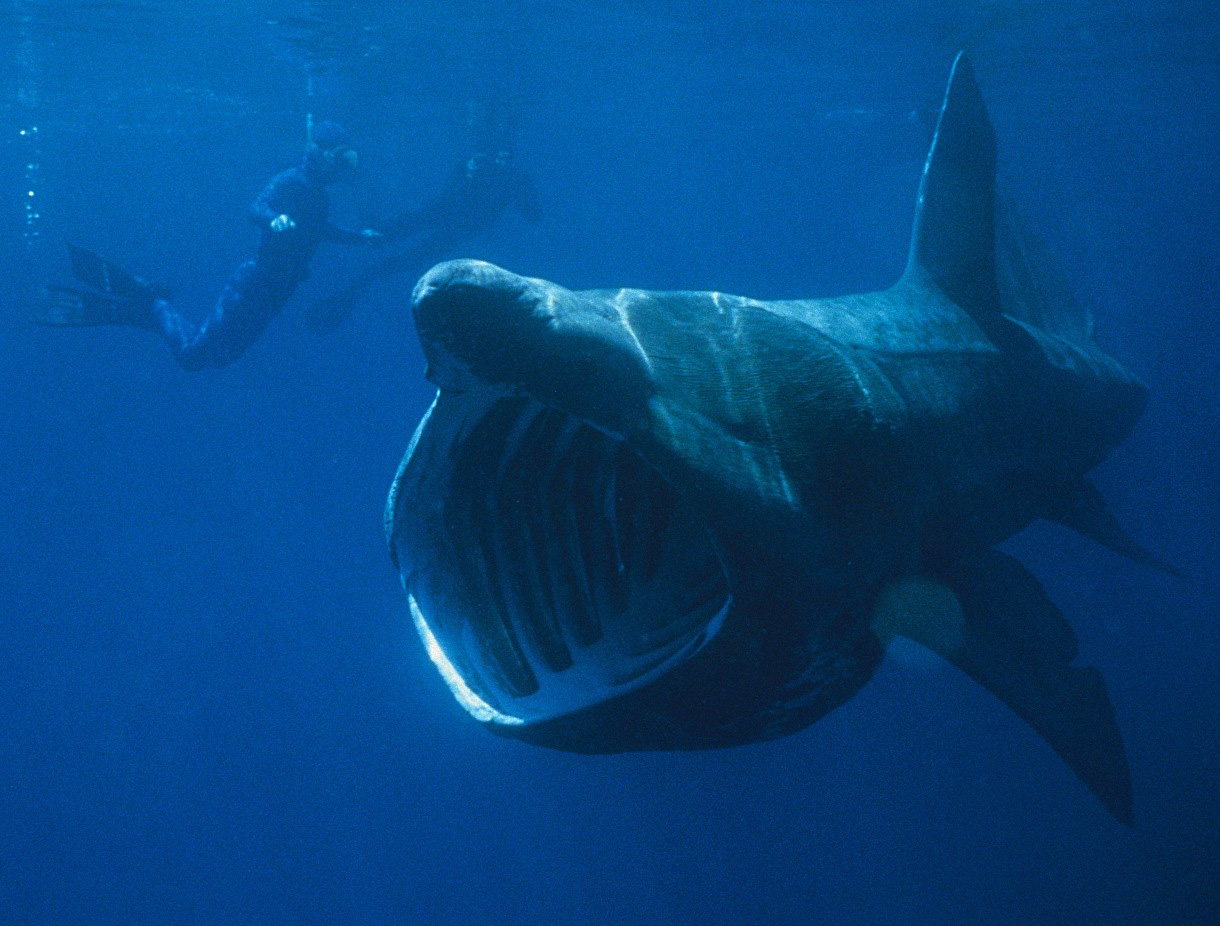
A basking shark

Family	Scientific name	English name	Swedish name	Habitat	Occurrence	Red List status
Alopiidae	Alopias vulpinus	Long-tailed thresher shark	Rävhaj	Marine	Sporadic	Not evaluated
Alopiidae	Cetorhinus maximus	Basking shark	Brugd	Marine	Sporadic	Endangered (EN)
Alopiidae	Lamna nasus	Porbeagle shark	Håbrand, sillhaj	Marine	Native and common	Critically endangered (CR)

=== Myxiniformes ===
The Myxiniformes, or hagfish, are a family of primitive eel-like fish. They live in marine waters, and in Swedish waters they are encountered west of Sweden in the Skagerrak and Kattegat. It lacks economic importance as it is not eaten.

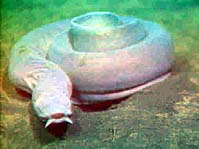
Hagfish

Family	Scientific name	English name	Swedish name	Habitat	Occurrence	Red List status
Myxinidae	Myxine glutinosa	Hagfish	Pirål	Marine	Native and common	Not evaluated

=== Lampriformes (deep sea ray finned fish) ===
The Lampriformes are an order of primitive, often rope-like, fishes. Living in deep-sea in tropical and temperate waters, they are rarely encountered in Nordic waters.

Family	Scientific name	English name	Habitat	Occurrence	Red List status
Lampridae (opah)	Lampris guttatus	N/A	Marine	Sporadic	Not evaluated
Regalecidae	Regalecus glesne	King of herrings	Marine	Sporadic	Not evaluated
Trachipteridae	Trachipterus arcticus	N/A	Marine	Sporadic	Not evaluated

=== Myctophiformes ===
The order Myctophiformes, which includes the family Myctophidae, or lanternfishes, consists of deep-sea fish common on the Southern Hemisphere and only rarely caught in Swedish waters.

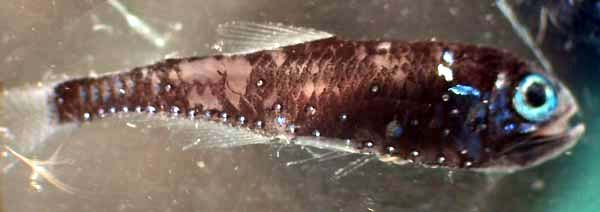
An unspecified lanternfish

Family	Scientific name	English name	Habitat	Occurrence	Red List status
Myctophidae (lanternfish)	Notoscopelus kroyeri	N/A	Marine	Sporadic	Not evaluated

=== Lophiiformes ===
The Lophiiformes, or angler fish, are deep-water fish with big heads. Of these, the angler or sea-devil (Lophius piscatorius) is common in Sweden in the waters west of Sweden in the Skagerrak and Kattegat. It is a tasty fish and therefore common in fish dishes, usually with its head removed. The Swedish catch in 1983 was 26 tonnes.

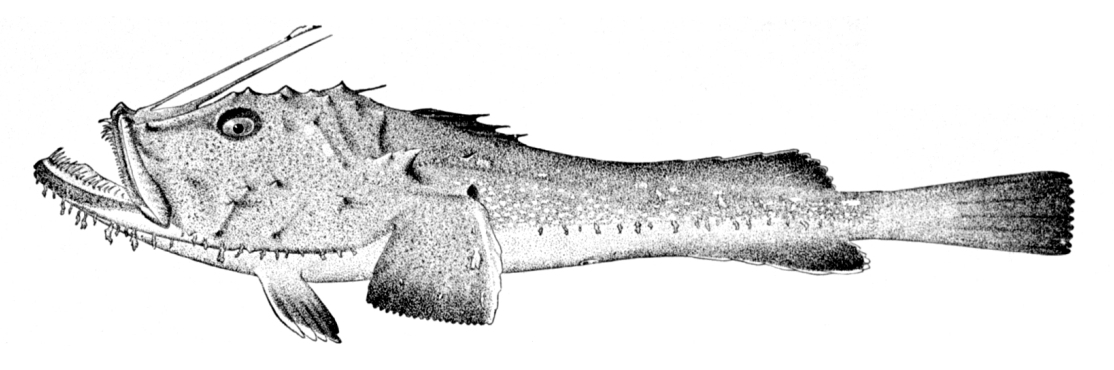
Angler

Family	Scientific name	English name	Swedish name	Habitat	Occurrence	Red List status
Lophiidae	Lophius piscatorius	Angler	Marulk	Marine	Native and common	Not evaluated

=== Mugiliformes ===
Family	Scientific name	English name	Habitat	Occurrence	Red List status
Mugilidae (mullets)	Chelon labrosus	N/A	Marine	Native and common	Not evaluated
Mugilidae	Liza aurata	N/A	Marine	Sporadic	Not evaluated
Mugilidae	Liza ramada	N/A	Marine	Sporadic	Not evaluated

=== Osmeriformes ===
The order Osmeriformes is generally encountered in the Atlantic Ocean as well as other oceans. A few species of the family Argentinidae extend their habitat to the Skagerrak where it is caught by Swedish ships. The catches are not food fish, but processed into fish meal.

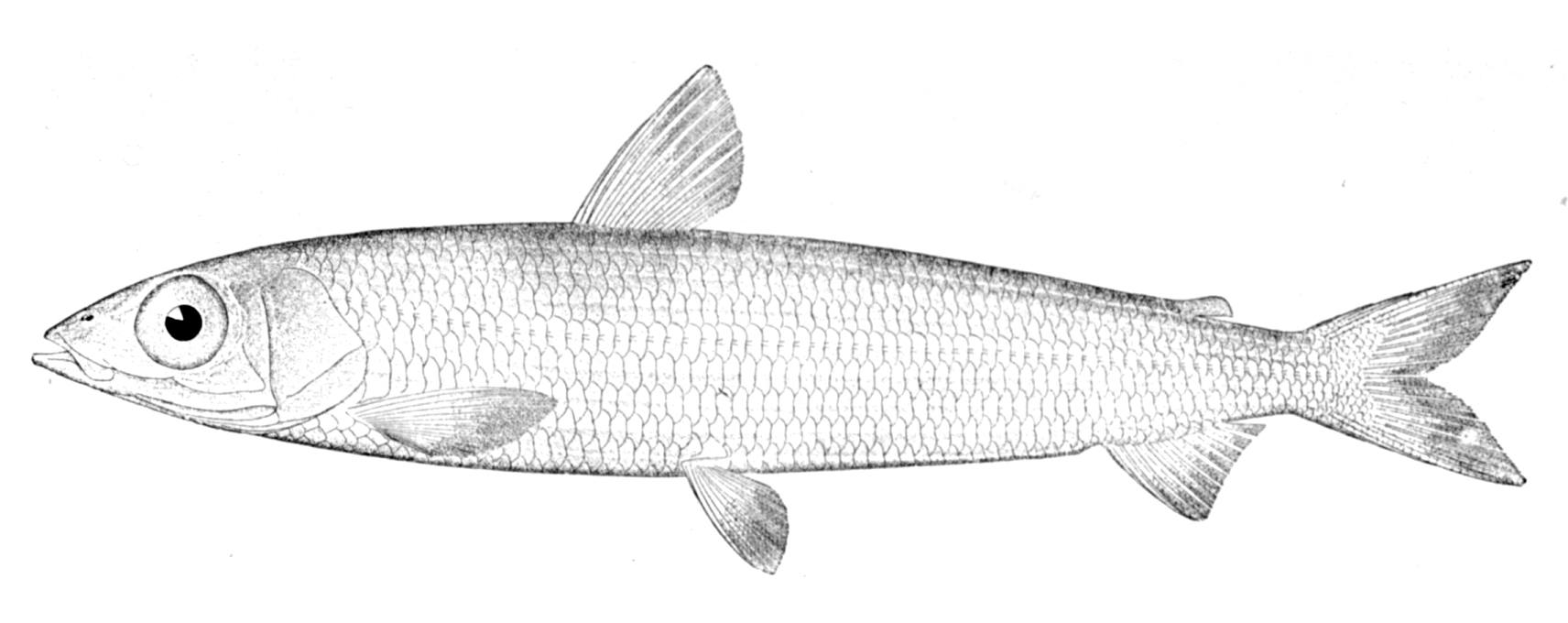
The Greater Argentine which reaches 70 cm

Family	Scientific name	English name	Swedish name	Habitat	Occurrence	Red List status
Osmeridae	Mallotus villosus	Capelin	Lodda	Marine	Sporadic	Not evaluated
Osmeridae	Osmerus eperlanus	European smelt	Slom / nors	Fresh, brackish water	Native and common	Not evaluated
Argentinidae	Argentina silus	Greater argentine		Marine	Native and common	Not evaluated
Argentinidae	Argentina sphyraena	Argentine		Marine	Native and common	Not evaluated

=== Perciformes (perch-like fish) ===
The Perciformes include about 40% of all fish. The name Perciformes means perch-like.

One of the best known types is the zander (gös in Swedish), common and native in Sweden and most of Europe. It is a popular game fish because of its taste. In Sweden it is common in all regions except the northernmost mountains and on the island of Gotland, and it is the provincial fish of Västmanland. The Swedish record weight is 12.007 kg.

The arguably most popular fish in Swedish fresh water is the European perch, and the annual catch is around 2,000 tonnes. It is common in the whole country—with the exception of the mountain regions in the north—and commonly encountered around the coast of the brackish Baltic Sea.

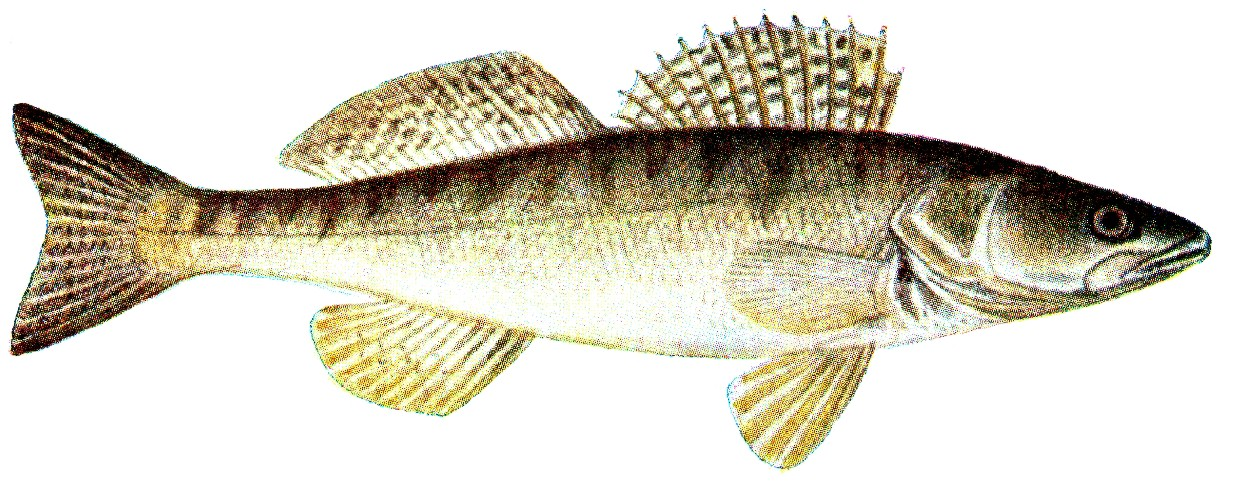
A zander

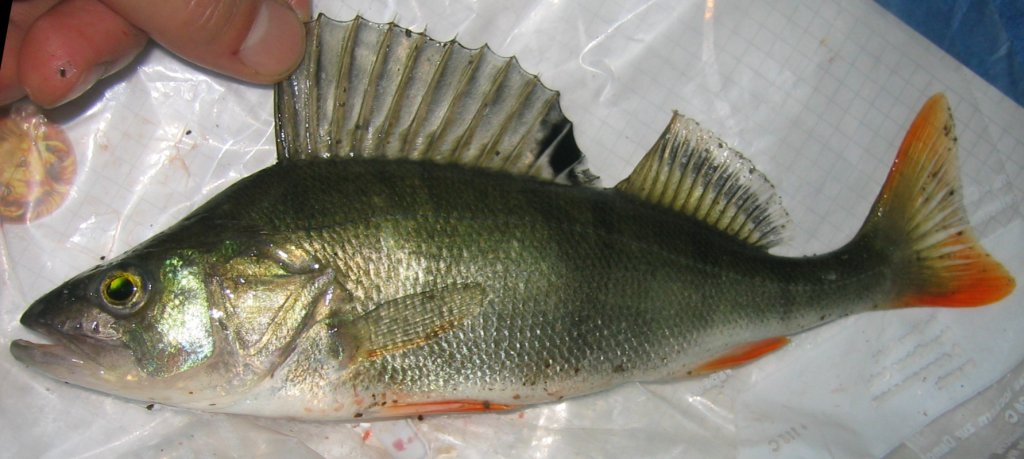
A small European perch

Family	Scientific name	English name	Swedish name	Habitat	Occurrence	Red List status
Ammodytidae (sand lance)	Ammodytes marinus	N/A	Havstobis	Marine	Native and common	Not evaluated
Ammodytidae	Ammodytes tobianus	Lesser sand eel	Kusttobis	Marine, brackish water	Native and common	Not evaluated
Ammodytidae	Hyperoplus lanceolatus	Greater sand eel	Tobiskung	Marine, brackish water	Native and common	Not evaluated
Anarhichadidae	Anarhichas denticulatus	N/A	Blå havskatt	Marine	Sporadic	Not evaluated
Anarhichadidae	Anarhichas lupus	Atlantic wolffish, seawolf	Havskatt	Marine	Native and common	Not evaluated
Anarhichadidae	Anarhichas minor	N/A	Fläckig havskatt	Marine	Sporadic	Not evaluated
Bramidae	Brama brama	Atlantic pomfret	Havsbraxen	Marine	Native and common	Not evaluated
Bramidae	Pterycombus brama	N/A	Fengömmare	Marine	Sporadic	Not evaluated
Callionymidae	Callionymus lyra	N/A	Randig sjökock	Marine	Native and common	Not evaluated
Callionymidae	Callionymus maculatus	N/A	Fläckig sjökock	Marine	Native and common	Not evaluated
Caproidae	Capros aper	N/A	Trynfisk	Marine	Sporadic	Not evaluated
Carangidae	Naucrates ductor	Pilot fish	Lotsfisk	Marine	Sporadic	Not evaluated
Carangidae	Trachinotus ovatus	N/A	Blå gaffelmakrill	Marine	Sporadic	Not evaluated
Carangidae	Trachurus trachurus	Atlantic horse mackerel	Taggmakrill	Marine	Native and common	Not evaluated
Centrarchidae	Micropterus dolomieu	Smallmouth bass	Svartabborre	Fresh water	Introduced	Not evaluated
Centrarchidae	Micropterus salmoides	Largemouth bass	Öringabborre	Fresh water	Introduced	Not evaluated
Centrolophidae	Centrolophus niger	Rudderfish	Svartfisk	Marine	Sporadic	Not evaluated
Centrolophidae	Hyperoglyphe perciformis	N/A	Svartfening	Marine	Sporadic	Not evaluated
Centrolophidae	Schedophilus medusophagus	N/A	Engelsk svartfisk	Marine	Sporadic	Not evaluated
Gempylidae	Lepidopus caudatus	Silver scabbardfish	Strumpebandsfisk	Marine	Sporadic	Not evaluated
Gempylidae	Nesiarchus nasutus	N/A	Havsgädda	Marine	Sporadic	Not evaluated
Gobiesocidae	Diplecogaster bimaculata	N/A	Tvåfläckig dubbelsugare	Marine	Sporadic	Not evaluated
Gobiidae	Aphia minuta	N/A	Klarbult	Marine	Native and common	Not evaluated
Gobiidae	Crystallogobius linearis	N/A	Glasbult	Marine	Native and common	Not evaluated
Gobiidae	Gobius niger	N/A	Svart smörbult	Marine	Native and common	Not evaluated
Gobiidae	Gobiusculus flavescens	N/A	Sjustrålig smörbult	Marine	Native and common	Not evaluated
Gobiidae	Lebetus scorpioides	N/A	Simpstubb	Marine	Native and common	Data deficient (DD)
Gobiidae	Lesueurigobius friesii	N/A	Spetsstjärtad smörbult	Marine	Native and common	Data deficient (DD)
Gobiidae	Neogobius melanostomus	Round goby	Svartmunnad smörbult	Euryhaline	Introduced, sporadic	Least concern (LC)
Gobiidae	Pomatoschistus microps	N/A	Lerstubb	Marine	Native and common	Not evaluated
Gobiidae	Pomatoschistus minutus	N/A	Sandstubb	Marine	Native and common	Not evaluated
Gobiidae	Pomatoschistus norvegicus	N/A	Dystubb	Marine	Native and common	Not evaluated
Gobiidae	Pomatoschistus pictus	N/A	Bergstubb	Marine	Native and common	Not evaluated
Gobiidae	Thorogobius ephippiatus	N/A	Leopardbult	Marine	Native and common	Least concern (LC)
Labridae	Acantholabrus palloni	N/A	Brunsnultra	Marine	Sporadic	Not evaluated
Labridae	Centrolabrus exoletus	N/A	Grässnultra	Marine	Native and common	Least concern (LC)
Labridae	Ctenolabrus rupestris	N/A	Stensnultra	Marine	Native and common	Not evaluated
Labridae	Labrus bergylta	Ballan wrasse	Berggylta	Marine	Native and common	Not evaluated
Labridae	Labrus mixtus	N/A	Blågylta	Marine	Native and common	Not evaluated
Labridae	Symphodus melops	N/A	Skärsnultra	Marine	Native and common	Not evaluated
Moronidae	Dicentrarchus labrax	European seabass	Havsabborre	Marine	Native and common	Not evaluated
Mullidae	Mullus surmuletus	N/A	Mulle	Marine	Sporadic	Not evaluated
Percidae	Gymnocephalus cernua	Ruffe	Gärs	Fresh and brackish water	Native and common	Not evaluated
Percidae	Perca fluviatilis	European perch	Abborre	Fresh and brackish water	Native and common	Not evaluated
Percidae	Sander lucioperca	Zander	Gös	Fresh and brackish water	Native and common	Not evaluated
Pholididae	Pholis gunnellus	N/A	Tejsterfisk	Marine, brackish water	Native and common	Not evaluated
Polyprionidae	Polyprion americanus	Atlantic wreckfish	Vrakfisk	Marine	Sporadic	Not evaluated
Sciaenidae	Argyrosomus regius	Meagre	Havsgös	Marine	Sporadic	Not evaluated
Scombridae (mackerel, tunas and bonitos)	Auxis randei	N/A	Auxid	Marine	Sporadic	Not evaluated
Scombridae	Euthynnus alletteratus	N/A	Tunnina	Marine	Sporadic	Not evaluated
Scombridae	Katsuwonus pelamis	Skipjack tuna	Bonit	Marine	Sporadic	Not evaluated
Scombridae	Orcynopsis unicolor	N/A	Ostrimmig pelamid	Marine	Sporadic	Not evaluated
Scombridae	Sarda sarda	Atlantic bonito	Ryggstrimming pelamid	Marine	Sporadic	Not evaluated
Scombridae	Scomber scombrus	Atlantic mackerel	Makrill	Marine	Native and common	Not evaluated
Scombridae	Thunnus thynnus	Bluefin tuna	Tonfisk	Marine	Sporadic, previously native and common	Not evaluated
Sparidae	Boops boops	Bogue	Oxögonfisk	Marine	Sporadic	Not evaluated
Sparidae	Oblada melanurus	N/A	Oblada	Marine	Sporadic	Not evaluated
Sparidae	Pagellus acarne	N/A	Pagell	Marine	Sporadic	Not evaluated
Sparidae	Pagellus bogaraveo	N/A	Fläckpagell	Marine	Sporadic	Not evaluated
Sparidae	Pagellus erythrinus’’	N/A	Rödpagell	Marine	(Sporadic)	Not evaluated
Sparidae	Sparus aurata	N/A	Guldsparid	Marine	Sporadic	Not evaluated
Sparidae	Spondyliosoma cantharus	N/A	Havsruda	Marine	Sporadic	Not evaluated
Stichaeidae	Chirolophis ascanii	Yarrell's blenny	Tångsnärta	Marine	Native and common	Least concern (LC)
Stichaeidae	Leptoclinus maculatus	N/A	Trubbstjärtat långebarn	Marine	Native and common	Not evaluated
Stichaeidae	Lumpenus lampretaeformis	N/A	Spetsstjärtat långebarn	Marine	Native and common	Not evaluated
Trachinidae	Trachinus draco	Greater weever	Fjärsing	Marine	Native and common	Not evaluated
Xiphiidae	Xiphias gladius	Swordfish	Svärdfisk	Marine	Sporadic	Not evaluated
Zoarcidae	Lycenchelys sarsii	N/A	Sydlig ålbrosme	Marine	Native and common	Not evaluated
Zoarcidae	Lycodes vahlii	N/A	Ålbrosme	Marine	Native and common	Not evaluated
Zoarcidae	Zoarces viviparus	Viviparous eelpout	Tånglake or ålkusa	Marine, brackish water	Native and common	Near threatened (NT)

=== Petromyzontiformes (lampreys) ===
A lamprey is a jawless fish with a toothed, funnel-like sucking mouth, with which most species bore into the flesh of other fishes to suck their blood. In zoology, lampreys are not considered to be true fish because of their vastly different morphology and physiology.

In Sweden, the European river lamprey (Lampetra fluviatilis), living in fresh waters, is the most usual usage of the term lamprey. The Lampetra planeri is a closely related species living in small streams, possibly even the same species.

The lamprey is the provincial fish of Västerbotten in northern Sweden.

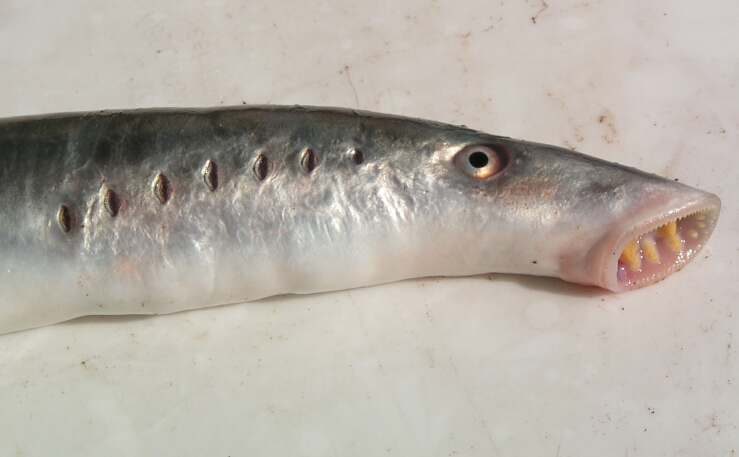
(European) river lamprey

Family	Scientific name	English name	Habitat	Occurrence	Red List status
Petromyzontidae	Lampetra fluviatilis	European river lamprey	Fresh water	Native and common	Near threatened (NT)
Petromyzontidae	Lampetra planeri	Brook lamprey	Fresh water	Native and common	Not evaluated
Petromyzontidae	Petromyzon marinus	Sea lamprey	Fresh water, marine	Native and common	Endangered (EN)

=== Pleuronectiformes (flatfish) ===
The flatfish are common as food fish.

Some notable specimens are the turbot which is common both on Sweden's east and west coasts. The Swedish catch was as much as 82 tonnes in the 1950s, but had decreased to 10–20 tonnes by the 1980s.

The plaice (Pleuronectes platessa) is one of Sweden's most important food fishes. It is common around the shores on both the east and west coast. The catch in 1983 was 540 tonnes.

The Atlantic halibut (Hippoglossus hippoglossus) was also once a major food fish, but overfishing in recent decades has endangered the population in Swedish waters. The fish was eaten in Sweden during the weekends when meat was prohibited, which explains the Swedish name helgeflundra, literally "holy flounder".

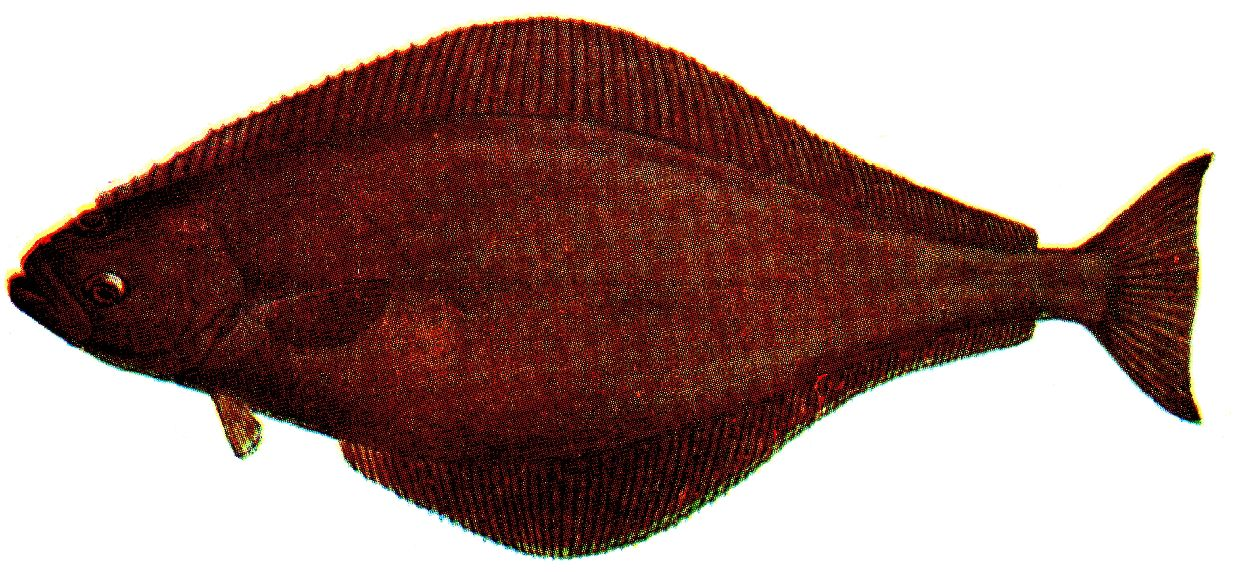
A halibut

Family	Scientific name	English name	Swedish name	Habitat	Occurrence	Red List status
Bothidae (left-eye flounders)	Arnoglossus laterna	N/A	Tungevar	Marine	Native and common	Not evaluated
Scophthalmidae	Lepidorhombus whiffiagonis	N/A	Glasvar	Marine	Sporadic	Not evaluated
Scophthalmidae	Phrynorhombus norvegicus	N/A	Småvar	Marine	Native and common	Not evaluated
Scophthalmidae	Psetta maxima	Turbot	Piggvar	Marine	Native and common	Near threatened (NT)
Scophthalmidae	Scophthalmus rhombus	Brill	Slätvar	Marine	Native and common	Not evaluated
Scophthalmidae	Zeugopterus punctatus	N/A	Bergvar	Marine	Native and common	Not evaluated
Pleuronectidae (right-eye flounders)	Glyptocephalus cynoglossus	N/A	Rädtunga	Marine	Native and common	Not evaluated
Pleuronectidae	Hippoglossoides platessoides	N/A	Lerskädda	Marine	Native and common	Not evaluated
Pleuronectidae	Hippoglossus hippoglossus	Atlantic halibut	Hälleflundra / helgeflundra	Marine	Native and common	Endangered (EN)
Pleuronectidae	Microstomus kitt	Lemon sole	Bergskädda	Marine	Native and common	Not evaluated
Pleuronectidae	Platichthys flesus	N/A	Skrubbskädda	Fresh, marine and brackish water	Native and common	Not evaluated
Pleuronectidae	Pleuronectes limanda	N/A	Sandskädda	Marine	Native and common	Not evaluated
Pleuronectidae	Pleuronectes platessa	European plaice	Rödspätta / spätta	Marine	Native and common	Not evaluated
Soleidae	Buglossidium luteum	N/A	Småtunga	Marine	Native and common	Not evaluated
Soleidae (Soles)	Solea solea	Sole	Tunga	Marine	Native and common	Not evaluated

=== Scorpaeniformes ===
The Scorpaeniformes are also known as mail-cheeked fishes due to their suborbital stay. Their head is armoured with bone plates. The families of this order are generally small, bottom living, and unsuited as food fish. As such, they lack commercial value.

An exception is the family Sebastidae, which contains appreciated food fish, but as they are rare in Swedish waters they are not subjected to systematic fishing.

Of the family Triglidae, most species are uncommon in Swedish waters, but the small Chelidonichthys gurnardus (25–30 cm) has in recent decades attracted attentions as a food fish. It is common in both the Skagerrak and Kattegat, and the amount of fish caught in 1983 was 9 tonnes.

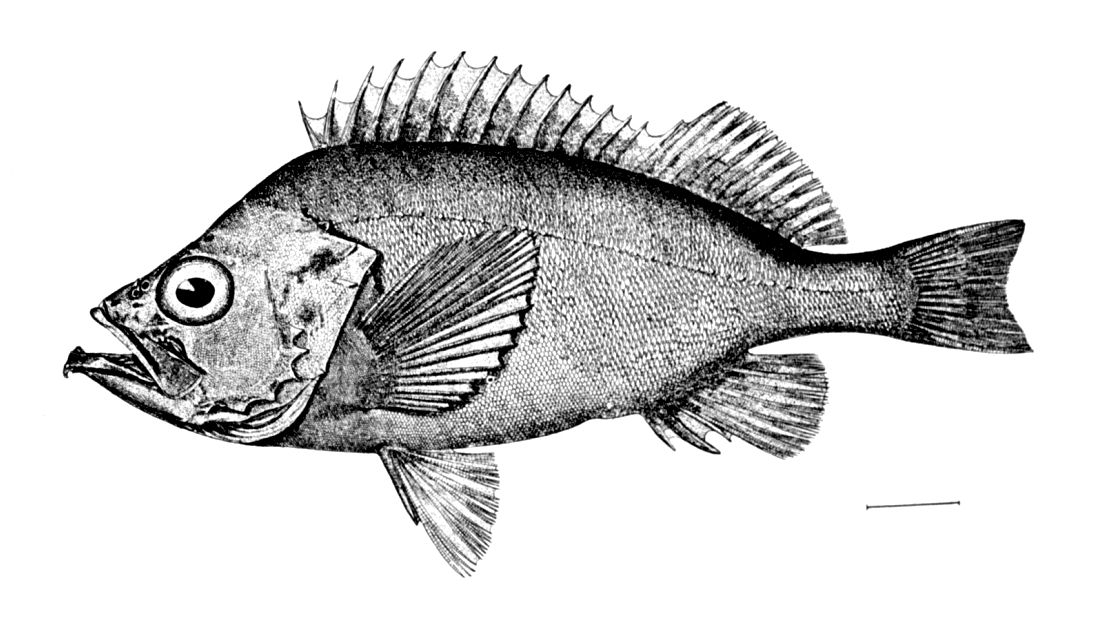
Ocean perch

Family	Scientific name	English name	Habitat	Occurrence	Red List status
Agonidae	Agonus cataphractus	N/A	Marine	Native and common	Not evaluated
Cottidae	Artediellus atlanticus	N/A	Marine	Native and common	Not evaluated
Cottidae	Cottus gobio	Bullhead	Fresh water	Native and common	Not evaluated
Cottidae	Cottus koshewnikowi	N/A	Fresh water	Native and common	Least concern (LC)
Cottidae	Cottus poecilopus	N/A	Fresh water	Native and common	Not evaluated
Cottidae	Icelus bicornis	Twohorn sculpin	Marine	Native and common	Not available (NA)
Cottidae	Micrenophrys lilljeborgii	N/A	Marine	Native and common	Data deficient (DD)
Cottidae	Myoxocephalus scorpius	N/A	Marine, brackish water	Native and common	Not evaluated
Cottidae	Taurulus bubalis	N/A	Marine, brackish water	Native and common	Not evaluated
Cottidae	Triglops murrayi	N/A	Marine	Sporadic	Not evaluated
Cottidae	Triglopsis quadricornis	N/A	Fresh water, brackish water	Native and common	Least concern (LC)
Cyclopteridae	Cyclopterus lumpus	Lumpsucker	Marine, brackish water	Native and common	Not evaluated
Cyclopteridae	Liparis liparis	N/A	Marine, brackish water	Native and common	Not evaluated
Cyclopteridae	Liparis montagui	N/A	Marine	Native and common	Not evaluated
Triglidae	Chelidonichthys cuculus	N/A	Marine	Sporadic	Not evaluated
Triglidae	Chelidonichthys gurnardus	N/A	Marine	Native and common	Not evaluated
Triglidae	Chelidonichthys lastoviza	N/A	Marine	Sporadic	Not evaluated
Triglidae	Chelidonichthys lucerna	N/A	Marine	Sporadic	Not evaluated
Triglidae	Trigla lyra	N/A	Marine	Sporadic	Not evaluated
Sebastidae	Helicolenus dactylopterus	N/A	Marine	Sporadic	Not evaluated
Sebastidae	Sebastes norvegicus	N/A	Marine	Native and common	Not evaluated
Sebastidae	Sebastes viviparus	N/A	Marine	Native and common	Near threatened (NT)

=== Rajiformes ===
The family of Rajiformes include ten families of ray-like fishes such as skates and stingrays.

Of the Rajiformes, three species are common in Nordic waters. The largest is the blue skate, which is common in the Skagerrak and Kattegatt west of Sweden but otherwise only sporadic. It is, together with the thornback ray (Raja clavata), the only cartilaginous fish of economic importance in Sweden.

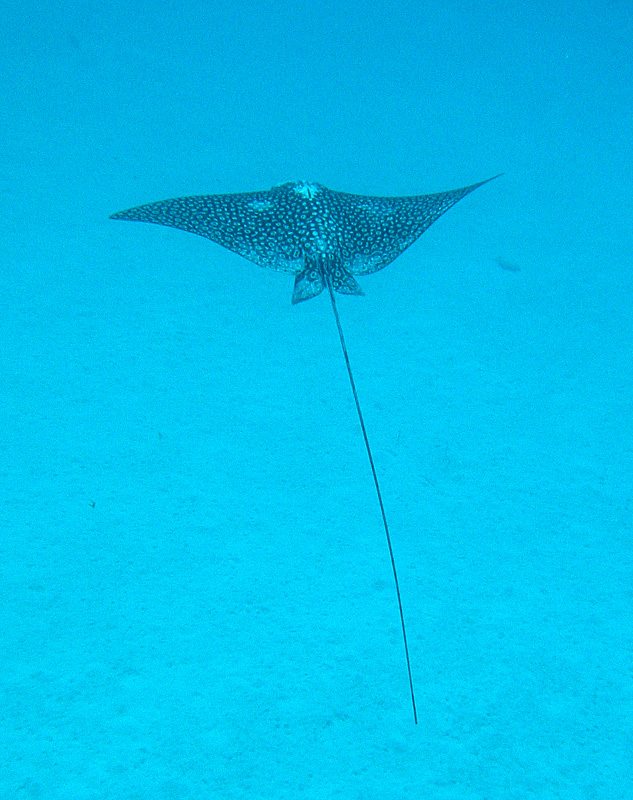
A spotted eagle ray

Family	Scientific name	English name	Habitat	Occurrence	Red List status
Rajidae (skate)	Amblyraja radiata	N/A	Marine	Native and common	Not evaluated
Rajidae	Dipturus batis	Blue skate	Marine	Native and common	Critically endangered (CR)
Rajidae	Dipturus linteus	N/A	Marine	Not confirmed	Not evaluated
Rajidae	Dipturus nidarosiensis	N/A	Marine	Not confirmed	Not evaluated
Rajidae	Dipturus oxyrinchus	N/A	Marine	Sporadic	Not evaluated
Rajidae	Leucoraja fullonica	N/A	Marine	Not confirmed	Not evaluated
Rajidae	Leucoraja naevus	N/A	Marine	Sporadic	Not evaluated
Rajidae	Raja clavata	Thumback ray	Marine	Native and common	Vulnerable (VU)
Dasyatididae	Dasyatis pastinaca	N/A	Marine	Sporadic	Not evaluated
Myliobatidae (eagle rays)	Myliobatis aquila	Common eagle ray	Marine	Sporadic	Not evaluated

=== Squaliformes (dogsharks) ===
Squaliformes is an order of sharks that includes the smooth dogfish and spiny dogfish. The most notable species here is the Greenland shark, Somniosus microcephalus, the second largest fish in Swedish waters.

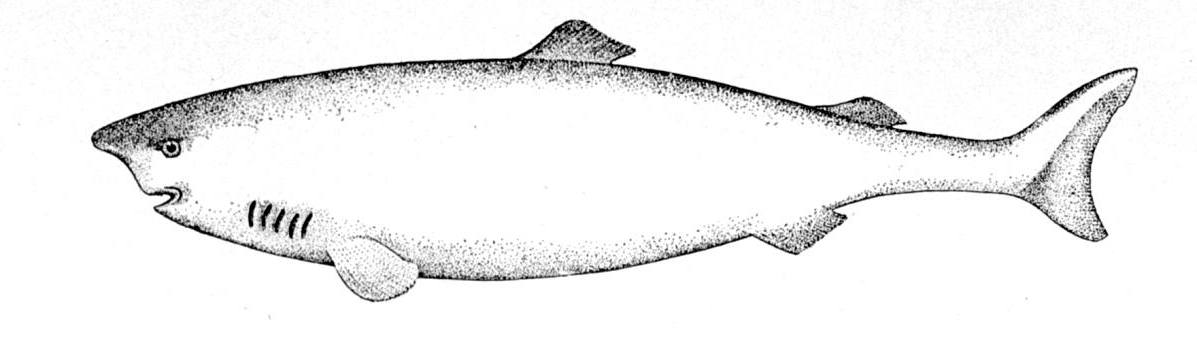
The Greenland shark

Family	Scientific name	English name	Swedish name	Habitat	Occurrence	Red List status
Etmopteridae	Etmopterus spinax	Velvet belly		Marine	Native and common	Vulnerable (VU)
Somniosidae	Somniosus microcephalus	Greenland shark	Håkärring	Marine	Native and common	Data deficient (DD)
Squalidae	Squalus acanthias	Piked dogfish	Pigghaj	Marine	Native and common	Endangered (EN)

=== Salmoniformes (salmon-like fish) ===
The Salmoniformes, salmon fish, are important both as food fish but also for sport fishers. For sport fishers, the salmon has the foremost position due to its strength and size. In popularity, it is followed by the brown trout (Salmo trutta).

Salmons are usually native to the marine, but a notable exception is the lake population in lake Vänern. As the salmon requires access to its native birth places through the streams, it is sensitive to power stations and other modifications of the streams. As a result, the salmon population has become extinct in some areas, but by stocking fish the population has been upheld. However, the artificial cultivation of salmon has also led to the negative side effects of diseases that have further threatened the salmon population.

The brown trout is conveniently divided into three species: marine, lake, and stream trouts. It was previously thought that the three species were genetically different, but recent studies are now more in favour of attributing the differences to environmental differences. The marine population is endangered for the same reasons as the salmon, but in fresh water it is still common.

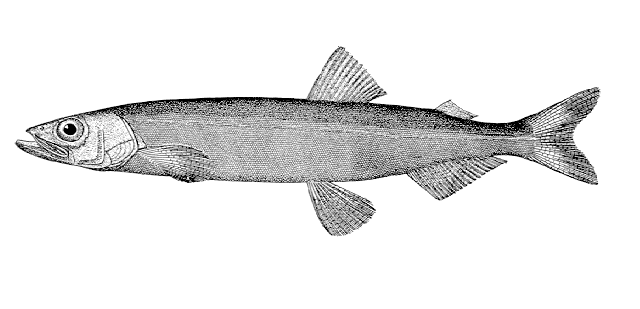
The capelin

Family	Scientific name	English name	Swedish name	Habitat	Occurrence	Red List status
Salmonidae	Coregonus albula	Vendace	Siklöja	Fresh and brackish water	Native and common	Not evaluated
Salmonidae	Coregonus maraena	Maraene		Fresh water	Native and common	Not evaluated
Salmonidae	Coregonus maxillaris	N/A	Storsik	Fresh and brackish water	Native only in Sweden; common	Not evaluated
Salmonidae	Coregonus megalops	Lacustrine fluvial whitefish	Blåsik	Fresh and brackish water	Native and common	Not evaluated
Salmonidae	Coregonus nilssoni	N/A	Planktonsik	Fresh and brackish water	Native and common	Not evaluated
Salmonidae	Coregonus pallasii	N/A	Aspsik	Fresh water	Native and common	Not evaluated
Salmonidae	Coregonus trybomi	N/A	Vårsiklöja	Fresh and brackish water	Native and common	Critically endangered (CR)
Salmonidae	Coregonus widegreni	Valaam whitefish	Sandsik	Fresh and brackish water	Native and common	Not evaluated
Salmonidae	Hucho hucho	Huchen	Donaulax	Fresh water	Introduced	Not evaluated
Salmonidae	Oncorhynchus clarkii	Cutthroat trout	Strupsnittsöring	Fresh water	Introduced	Not evaluated
Salmonidae	Oncorhynchus gorbuscha	Pink salmon	Puckellax	Fresh and brackish water	Introduced	Not evaluated
Salmonidae	Oncorhynchus kisutch	Coho salmon	Silverlax	Fresh and brackish water	Introduced	Not evaluated
Salmonidae	Oncorhynchus mykiss	Rainbow trout	Regnbåge	Fresh and brackish water	Introduced	Not evaluated
Salmonidae	Oncorhynchus nerka	Sockeye salmon	Indianlax	Fresh water	Introduced	Not evaluated
Salmonidae	Salmo salar	Atlantic salmon	Lax	Fresh, marine and brackish water	Native and common	Least concern (LC), locally endangered (EN)
Salmonidae	Salmo trutta	Brown trout	Öring	Fresh, marine and brackish water	Native and common	Least concern (LC)
Salmonidae	Salvelinus alpinus	Arctic char	Fjällröding	Fresh water	Native and common	Not evaluated
Salmonidae	Salvelinus fontinalis	Brook trout	Bäckröding	Fresh water	Introduced	Not evaluated
Salmonidae	Salvelinus namaycush	Lake trout	Canadaröding	Fresh water	Introduced	Not evaluated
Salmonidae	Thymallus thymallus	Greyling	Harr	Fresh and brackish water	Native and common	Least concern (LC)

=== Stomiiformes (dragon-like fish) ===
Fish of this order are deep-sea ray-finned fishes of very diverse morphology, including dragonfish, lightfish, marine hatchetfish and viperfish. Primarily residing in temperate waters they are uncommon in Swedish waters.

Family	Scientific name	English name	Habitat	Occurrence	Red List status
Sternoptychidae	Argyropelecus olfersii	N/A	Marine	Sporadic	Not evaluated
Sternoptychidae	Maurolicus muelleri	Pearlsides	Marine	Sporadic	Not evaluated

=== Siluriformes (catfish) ===
Siluriformes, or catfish, are a diverse order of fish distinguished by prominent barbels, which give the image of cat-like whiskers. In Swedish waters, the only species of this order is the wels catfish (Siluris glanis). This very large freshwater fish is common over much of continental Europe, and was once well known in Sweden. Today, its presence is only confirmed in the streams Helgeån, Emån and Båven.

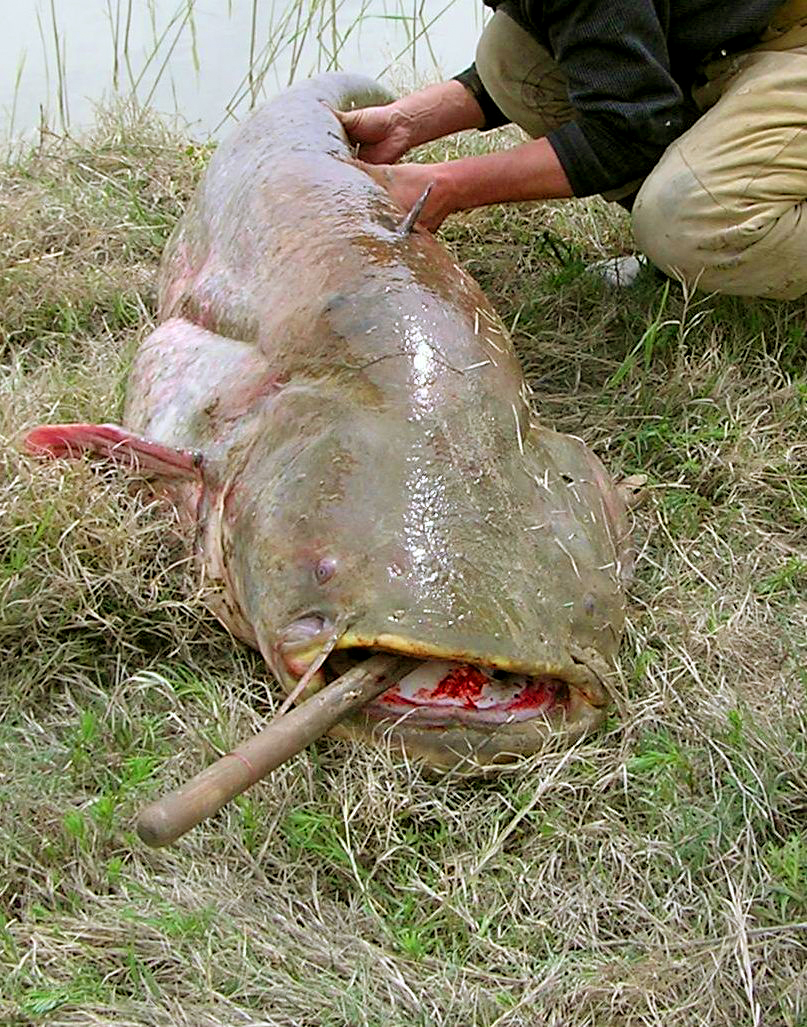
Catfish, Silurus glanis

Family	Scientific name	English name	Swedish name	Habitat	Occurrence	Red List status
Siluridae	Silurus glanis	Wels catfish	Mal	Fresh water	Native and common	Critically endangered (CR)

=== Squatiniformes (angel sharks) ===
The order of angel sharks are uncommon in Nordic waters. A sporadic visitor is however the angelshark, Squatina squatina, encountered on a few occasions between 1875 and 1961.

Family	Scientific name	English name	Habitat	Occurrence	Red List status
Squatinidae	Squatina squatina	Angelshark	Marine	Sporadic	Not evaluated

=== Tetraodontiformes ===
Tetraodontiformes are ray-finned fish, most of which are marine and dwell around tropical coral reefs. As such, they are only rarely encountered in Nordic waters. The large sunfish (Mola mola) has however in recent decades been seen with more regularly in Swedish waters, almost on a yearly basis.

Family	Scientific name	English name	Habitat	Occurrence	Red List status
Balistidae	Balistes capriscus	N/A	Marine	Sporadic	Not evaluated
Balistidae	Canthidermis maculata	N/A	Marine	Sporadic	Not evaluated
Molidae	Mola mola	Ocean sunfish	Marine	Sporadic	Not evaluated

=== Zeiformes ===
The order Zeiformes is best known for the dories. Generally not native in Nordic waters, but the John Dory (Zeus faber) became an occasional visitor around Swedish coasts by the late 19th century, and has in the latest decades been seen with annual regularity, although not in such quantities that systematical fishing of it is conducted. The fish is otherwise an attractive food fish in southern Europe and other parts of the world.

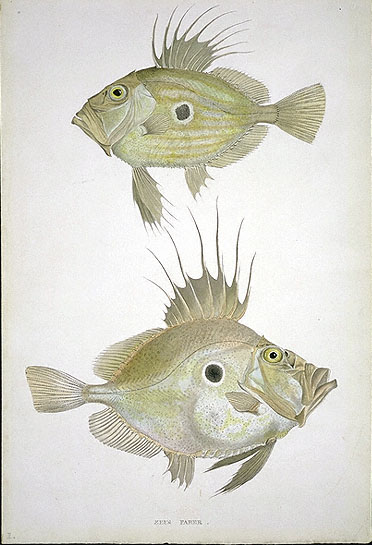
John Dory

Family	Scientific name	English name	Swedish name	Habitat	Occurrence	Red List status
Zeidae	Zeus faber	John dory	Sanktpersfisk / Sankt Pers fisk	Marine	Sporadic	Not evaluated

== Resources ==
- Kullander, S.O. 2002. Svenska fiskar: Förteckning över svenska fiskar. World Wide Web elektronisk publikation; Naturhistoriska riksmuseet. https://web.archive.org/web/20050826044135/http://www2.nrm.se/ve/pisces/allfish.shtml.se
- English/Latin names of fishes
- Swedish Sportfishers: Sportfishing Official Records in Fresh Waters -- Officiella rekord i svenska sötvatten

== Literature ==
- Gärdenfors, U. (red). (2005). Rödlistade arter i Sverige 2005. [The 2005 Red List of Swedish Species]. Artdatabanken, Uppsala, 496 pp.
- Fries, B. Fr., C. U. Ekström & C. J. Sundewall. 1836-1857. Skandinaviens Fiskar. P.A. Norstedt & Söner, Stockholm, IV+222 ss. Appendix 1-44, 1-140, pl. 1-60.
- Kottelat, M. (1997). "European freshwater fishes: An heuristic checklist of the freshwater fishes of Europe (exclusive of former USSR), with an introduction for non-systematists and comments on nomenclature and conservation". Biologia, Zool., 52, suppl. 5: 1–271.
