= List of fishes of Estonia =

This is a list of Estonian fish. Native (usually synonymous with indigenous) species are considered to be species which are today present in the region in question, and have been continuously present in that region since a certain period of time. There are no endemic fish species in Estonia (that is, there are no fish species native to only this region).

== Petromyzontiformes ==
=== Family Petromyzontidae ===
- European river lamprey, Lampetra fluviatilis
- Brook lamprey, Lampetra planeri
- Sea lamprey, Petromyzon marinus

== Acipenseriformes ==
=== Family Acipenseridae ===
- European sea sturgeon, Acipenser sturio

== Clupeiformes ==
=== Family Clupeidae ===
- Twait shad, Alosa fallax
- Atlantic herring, Clupea harengus membras
- European sprat, Sprattus sprattus balticus

=== Family Engraulidae ===
- European anchovy, Engraulis encrasicholus

== Salmoniformes ==
=== Family Salmonidae ===
- Vendace, Coregonus albula
- Common whitefish, Coregonus lavaretus
  - Coregonus lavaretus maraenoides
- Northern whitefish, Coregonus peled
- Rainbow trout, Oncorhynchus mykiss
- Atlantic salmon, Salmo salar
- Brown trout, Salmo trutta
  - Brown trout (riverine form), Salmo trutta morpha fario
- Grayling, Thymallus thymallus

== Osmeriformes ==
=== Family Osmeridae ===
- European smelt, Osmerus eperlanus
  - Osmerus eperlanus morpha spirinchus

== Esociformes ==
=== Family Esocidae ===
- Northern pike, Esox lucius

== Anguilliformes ==
=== Family Anguillidae ===
- European eel, Anguilla anguilla

== Cypriniformes ==
=== Family Cyprinidae ===
- Carp bream, Abramis brama
- Spirlin, Alburnoides bipunctatus
- Bleak, Alburnus alburnus
- Bighead carp, Aristichthys nobilis
- Asp, Aspius aspius
- Silver bream, Blicca bjoerkna
- Crucian carp, Carassius carassius
- Prussian carp, Carassius gibelio
- Grass carp, Ctenopharyngodon idella
- Common carp, Cyprinus carpio
- Gudgeon, Gobio gobio
- Moderlieschen, Leucaspius delineatus
- European chub, Leuciscus cephalus
- Ide, Leuciscus idus
- Common dace, Leuciscus leuciscus
- Ziege, Pelecus cultratus
- Eurasian minnow, Phoxinus phoxinus
- Roach, Rutilus rutilus
- Rudd, Scardinius erythrophthalmus
- Tench, Tinca tinca
- Zarte, Vimba vimba

=== Family Cobitidae ===
- Spined loach, Cobitis taenia
- Weatherfish, Misgurnus fossilis

=== Family Balitoridae ===
- Stone loach, Barbatula barbatula

== Siluriformes ==
=== Family Siluridae ===
- Wels catfish, Silurus glanis

=== Family Ictaluridae ===
- Channel catfish, Ictalurus punctatus

== Beloniformes ==
=== Family Belonidae ===
- Garfish, Belone belone

== Gadiformes ==
=== Family Gadidae ===
- Atlantic cod, Gadus morhua callarias
- Burbot, Lota lota
- Pollock, Pollachius pollachius

=== Family Phycidae ===
- Four-bearded rockling, Rhinonemus cimbrius

== Gasterosteiformes ==
=== Family Gasterosteidae ===
- Three-spined stickleback, Gasterosteus aculeatus
- Nine-spined stickleback, Pungitius pungitius
- Fifteen-spined stickleback, Spinachia spinachia

=== Family Sungnathidae ===
- Straightnose pipefish, Nerophis ophidion
- Deepnosed pipefish, Syngnathus typhle

== Perciformes ==
=== Family Percidae ===
- Eurasian ruffe, Gymnocephalus cernuus
- European perch, Perca fluviatilis
- Zander, Sander lucioperca

=== Family Stichaeidae ===
- Snake blenny, Lumpenus lampetraeformis

=== Family Pholididae ===
- Butterfish, Pholis gunnellus

=== Family Zoarcidae ===
- Viviparous eelpout, Zoarces viviparus

=== Family Ammodytidae ===
- Lesser sand eel, Ammodytes tobianus
- Great sandeel, Hyperoplus lanceolatus

=== Family Gobiidae ===
- Twospotted goby, Coryphopterus flavescens
- Black goby, Gobius niger
- Round goby, Neogobius melanostomus
- Common goby, Pomatoschistus microps
- Sand goby, Pomatoschistus minutus

=== Family Trichiuridae ===
- Atlantic mackerel, Scomber scomber

=== Family Xiphiidae ===
- Swordfish, Xiphias gladius

== Scorpaeniformes ==
=== Family Cottidae ===
- European bullhead, Cottus gobio
- Father Lasher, Myoxocephalus scorpius
- Long-spined sea scorpion, Taurulus bubalis
- Fourhorn sculpin, Triglopsis quadricornis

=== Family Cyclopteridae ===
- Lumpsucker, Cyclopterus lumpus

=== Family Liparidae ===
- Snailfish, Liparis liparis

== Pleuronectiformes ==
=== Family Scophthalmidae ===
- Turbot, Scophthalmus maximus

=== Family Pleuronectidae ===
- Common dab, Limanda limanda
- European flounder, Platichtys flesus trachurus
- European plaice, Pleuronectes platessa
