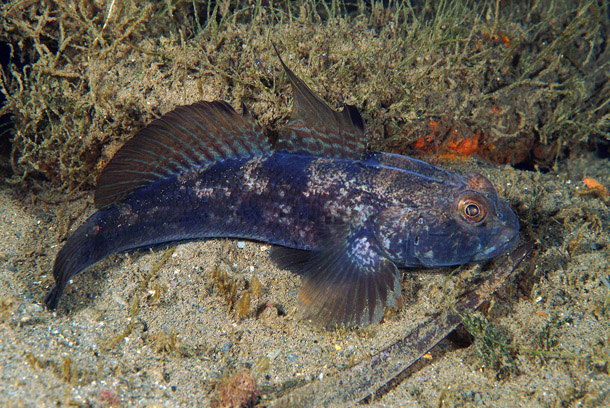

Conservation status
- Least Concern (IUCN 3.1)

Scientific classification
- Kingdom: Animalia
- Phylum: Chordata
- Class: Actinopterygii
- Division: Teleostei
- Order: Gobiiformes
- Family: Gobiidae
- Genus: Gobius
- Species: G. niger

Binomial name
- Gobius niger Linnaeus, 1758

Synonyms
- Gobius jozo Linnaeus, 1758; Gobius niger jozo Linnaeus, 1758; Gobius gorgione Rafinesque, 1810; Gobius viridis A. W. Otto, 1821; Gobius longiradiatus Risso, 1827; Gobius brittanicus W. Thompson, 1837; Gobius fuliginosus McCoy, 1841; Gobius jozo pontica Kessler, 1859; Gobius jozo albescens Canestrini, 1862; Gobius jozo nigrescens Canestrini, 1862; Gobius punctulatus Cocco, 1884–85; Gobius jozo minor Kolombatovic, 1891; Gobius jozo major Kolombatovic, 1891; Gobius niger hispanicus de Buen, 1928; Gobius niger nigerrimus de Buen, 1928

= Black goby =

Species of fish

The black goby (Gobius niger) is a species of ray-finned fish found in the Eastern Atlantic and Mediterranean Sea and Black Sea. It inhabits estuaries, lagoons, and inshore water over seagrass and algae. It feeds on a variety of invertebrates and sometimes small fish. This species can also be found in the aquarium trade.

This fish reaches a maximum length of 18 centimetres (7 in) TL. This fish's neck is scaled and both of its dorsal fins have a black spot on the front end.

== Description ==
The black goby is deeper-bodied than the common goby, sand goby and two-spotted goby with a more rounded snout and generally a larger size. It has two dorsal fins that are almost continuous, the anterior one having six spines, which may project from the fin membrane, and the posterior and shorter one having soft rays. The posterior dorsal fin terminates close to the caudal peduncle in contrast to the common and sand gobies where there is a long gap. The pelvic fins are fused. The colour is some shade of dark brown with indistinct black blotches. The colour of the male becomes almost black during the breeding season and his fins become more vivid. The average size of this fish is about 5 to 7 cm (2.0 to 2.8 in)

== Distribution and habitat ==
The black goby is native to shallow waters in the eastern Atlantic Ocean, the Mediterranean Sea and the Black Sea. Its range extends from Cape Blanc in Mauritania to Trondheim in Norway and the Baltic Sea and it is usually found at depths less than 50 metres (160 ft). Its typical habitat is lagoons, estuaries and inshore waters, on sandy or muddy bottoms and among seagrasses and seaweeds, and it occasionally moves into fresh water.

== Behaviour ==
The black goby feeds on small invertebrates on the seabed. It breeds in the summer at which time the male creates a territory in a shallow weedy area and prepares a nest on a clean piece of seabed. He invites the female to inspect it and if she approves, she lays her eggs there and the male guards them until they hatch.
