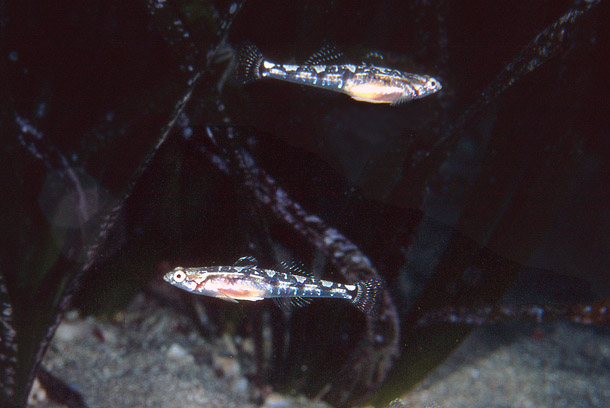

Conservation status
- Least Concern (IUCN 3.1)

Scientific classification
- Kingdom: Animalia
- Phylum: Chordata
- Class: Actinopterygii
- Division: Teleostei
- Order: Gobiiformes
- Family: Oxudercidae
- Genus: Pomatoschistus
- Species: P. quagga

Binomial name
- Pomatoschistus quagga (Heckel, 1837)

Synonyms
- Gobius quagga Heckel, 1837

= Quagga goby =

Species of fish

Pomatoschistus quagga, the Quagga goby, is a species of goby native to the western part of the Mediterranean Sea and the Adriatic Sea. It occurs above soft substrates and in beds of eelgrass. This species can reach a length of 6 centimetres (2.4 in) TL.
