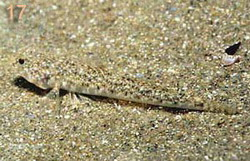

Conservation status
- Least Concern (IUCN 3.1)

Scientific classification
- Domain: Eukaryota
- Kingdom: Animalia
- Phylum: Chordata
- Class: Actinopterygii
- Order: Gobiiformes
- Family: Gobiidae
- Genus: Pomatoschistus
- Species: P. marmoratus

Binomial name
- Pomatoschistus marmoratus (A. Risso, 1810)

Synonyms
- Atherina marmorata Risso, 1810; Gobius marmoratus (Risso, 1810); Gobius reticulatus Valenciennes, 1837; Gobius leopardinus Nordmann, 1840; Pomatoschistus microps leopardinus (Nordmann, 1840); Gobius rhodopterus Günther, 1861; Gobius ferrugineus Kolombatović, 1891; Syrrhothonus charrieri Chabanaud, 1933

= Marbled goby =

Species of fish

Pomatoschistus marmoratus, the marbled goby, is a species of goby native to the eastern Atlantic from the Bay of Biscay down around the Iberian Peninsula through the Mediterranean Sea, the Black Sea and the Sea of Azov. It is also found in the Suez Canal in Egypt. It occurs in marine and brackish waters on sandy substrates in shallow waters, typically down to 20 m (66 ft), but occasionally to 70 m (230 ft) in the winter. It can reach a length of 8 cm (3.1 in) TL though most do not exceed 5 centimetres (2.0 in) TL.
