= Pomatoschistus nanus =

Conservation status
- Data Deficient (IUCN 3.1)

Scientific classification
- Kingdom: Animalia
- Phylum: Chordata
- Class: Actinopterygii
- Order: Gobiiformes
- Family: Oxudercidae
- Genus: Pomatoschistus
- Species: P. nanus

Binomial name
- Pomatoschistus nanus Engin & Seyhan, 2017

Species of fish

Pomatoschistus nanus is a species of goby native to the Levantine coast, in the Turkish territory. it is the smallest species of goby ever described in the Mediterranean sea.
