= Diplecogaster tonstricula =

Conservation status
- Least Concern (IUCN 3.1)

Scientific classification
- Kingdom: Animalia
- Phylum: Chordata
- Class: Actinopterygii
- Order: Blenniiformes
- Family: Gobiesocidae
- Genus: Diplecogaster
- Species: D. tonstricula

Binomial name
- Diplecogaster tonstricula Fricke, Wirtz and Brito, 2015

Species of fish

Diplecogaster tonstricula, commonly known as the Eastern Atlantic cleaner clingfish, is a species of clingfish from the family Gobiesocidae, which is found in the tropical eastern North Atlantic Ocean. It has been observed cleaning larger species of fish.

== Description ==
Diplecogaster tonstricula, in life, displays a normal ground colour of bright orange on the head and body, adorned with thin yellowish or whitish bars that originate between the eyes. The colouration of the head, extending to the front of the eyes, appears as pale olive with whitish streaks. The eye itself is pale green with brown barring towards the rear, accompanied by a yellow ring encircling the iris. Notably, there is a white spot with black margins resembling an eye located on the cheek. The fins are orange.

In terms of its shape, this species exhibits the characteristic triangular head, elongated body, and small dorsal and anal fins positioned toward the rear, as often seen in clingfishes. It was classified within the genus Diplecogaster due to the features defined by John Carmon Briggs in 1955 for this genus. These characteristics include having 3^{1}/_{2} gill slits, a double disked sucker, specific counts of spines and rays in its dorsal and anal fins, the absence of an opercular spine, and its dentition lacking incisors or canine teeth.

== Distribution ==
Diplecogaster tonstricula has been recorded from Senegal and the Canary Islands in the eastern North Atlantic Ocean. In the Canaries it has been recorded off the islands of El Hierro, Tenerife and Fuerteventura. It is thought that the species will be found to be more widespread than its current known distribution.

== Habitat and biology ==
Diplecogaster tonstricula has been collected and seen at depths of 10–38 metres (33–125 ft) mostly where there is hard substrate. This species has been observed to be facultative cleaner of larger fishes such as moray eels and serranids.

== Taxonomy and etymology ==
Diplecogaster tonstricula was described by Ronald Fricke, Peter Wirtz and Alberto Brito in 2015 from types collected near Dakar. It forms a species group with Diplecogaster ctenocrypta. The generic name Diplecogaster is a compound of di meaning "two", pleco meaning "fold" and gaster meaning belly, a reference to the double disked sucker of this genus while the specific name tonstricula is Latin for "little lady barber" and refers to its habit of cleaning larger fish.
