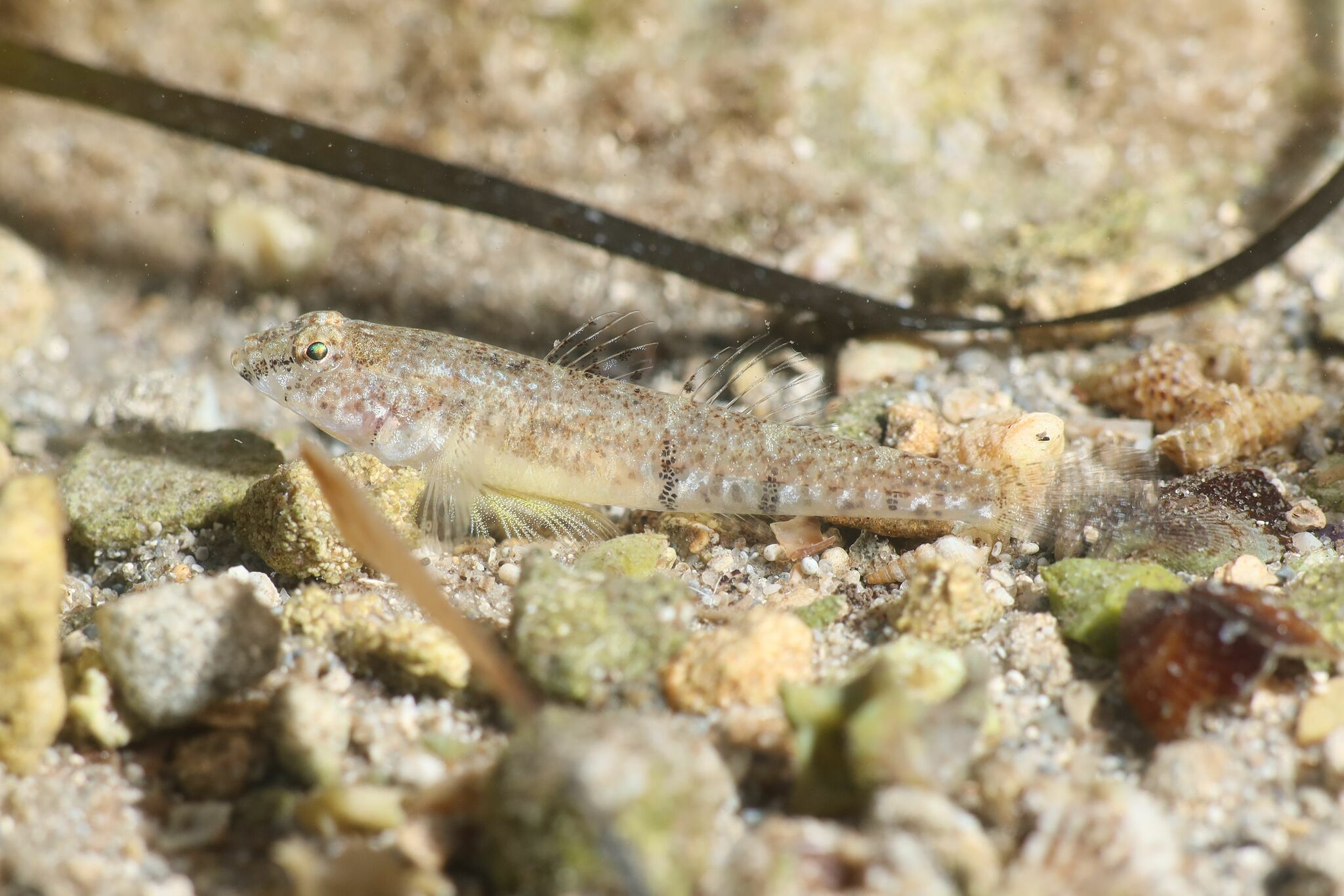

Conservation status
- Vulnerable (IUCN 3.1)

Scientific classification
- Kingdom: Animalia
- Phylum: Chordata
- Class: Actinopterygii
- Division: Teleostei
- Order: Gobiiformes
- Family: Oxudercidae
- Genus: Pomatoschistus
- Species: P. tortonesei

Binomial name
- Pomatoschistus tortonesei P. J. Miller, 1969

= Tortonese's goby =

Species of fish

Pomatoschistus tortonesei, Tortonese's goby, is a species of goby native to the Mediterranean Sea where it is known from Marsala, Sicily and the Farwah Lagoon in western Libya. This species occurs in shallow waters ranging in salinity from brackish to just slightly hypersaline. It prefers habitats with sandy substrates near to beds of seagrass. Its diet consists of small crustaceans and gastropods. It is threatened by the fragmentation and destruction of its preferred habitat by silting. The specific name honours the Italian zoologist Enrico Tortonése (1911–1987) of the Museo Civico di Storia Naturale di Genova.
