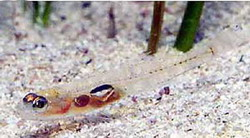

Conservation status
- Least Concern (IUCN 3.1)

Scientific classification
- Kingdom: Animalia
- Phylum: Chordata
- Class: Actinopterygii
- Order: Gobiiformes
- Family: Oxudercidae
- Genus: Pomatoschistus
- Species: P. knerii

Binomial name
- Pomatoschistus knerii (Steindachner, 1861)

Synonyms
- Gobius knerii Steindachner, 1861

= Kner's goby =

Species of fish

Pomatoschistus knerii, Kner's goby, is a species of goby native to the western basin of the Mediterranean Sea as well as the Adriatic Sea. This species occurs in near the bottom in areas with soft substrates near to rocks or beds of seagrass. The specific name of this fish most likely honours the Austrian ichthyologist Rudolf Kner (1810-1869), who was a friend of the author, Franz Steindachner.
