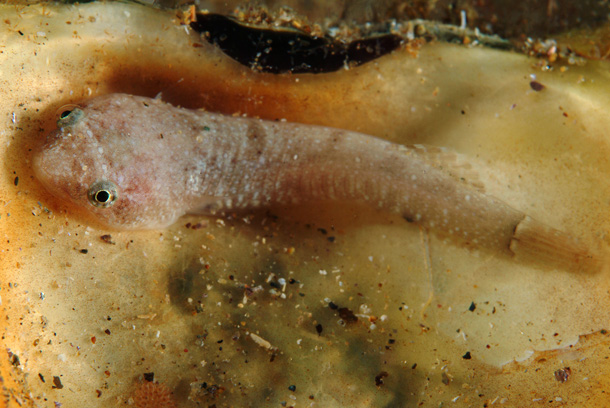
- Diplecogaster bimaculata

Scientific classification
- Kingdom: Animalia
- Phylum: Chordata
- Class: Actinopterygii
- Division: Teleostei
- Order: Blenniiformes
- Family: Gobiesocidae
- Subfamily: Gobiesocinae
- Genus: Diplecogaster; Fraser-Brunner, 1938

Type species
- Cyclopterus bimaculatus Bonnaterre, 1788

= Diplecogaster =

Genus of fishes

Diplecogaster is a genus of fish in the family Gobiesocidae found in Black Sea, Mediterranean Sea and Atlantic Ocean.

== Species ==
There are currently 8 recognized species in this genus:

- Diplecogaster bimaculata (Bonnaterre, 1788) (Two-spotted clingfish)
- Diplecogaster ctenocrypta Briggs, 1955 (Eastern Atlantic deep-water clingfish)
- Diplecogaster euxinica Murgoci, 1964
- Diplecogaster megalops Briggs, 1955 (Big-eye clingfish)
- Diplecogaster pectoralis Briggs, 1955
- Diplecogaster roseiocula Fricke & Wirtz, 2023
- Diplecogaster tonstricula Fricke, Wirtz & Brito, 2015 (Eastern Atlantic cleaner clingfish)
- Diplecogaster umutturali Bilecenoğlu, Yokeş & Kovačić, 2017
