= Lycodes gracilis =

Conservation status
- Least Concern (IUCN 3.1)

Scientific classification
- Kingdom: Animalia
- Phylum: Chordata
- Class: Actinopterygii
- Order: Perciformes
- Family: Zoarcidae
- Genus: Lycodes
- Species: L. gracilis

Binomial name
- Lycodes gracilis Sars, 1867

Synonyms
- Lycodes vahli gracilis Sars, 1867; Lycodes lugubris Lütken, 1880; Lycodes vahli septentrionalis Knipowitsch, 1906

Species of fish

Lycodes gracilis, Vahl's eelpout or the gracile eelpout, is a species of marine ray-finned fish belonging to the family Zoarcidae, the eelpouts. It is found in the eastern North Atlantic Ocean and adjacent areas of the Arctic Ocean.

== Taxonomy ==
Lycodes gracilis was first formally described in 1867 by the Norwegian theologian and naturalist Michael Sars with the type locality given as Drøbaksundet in Oslofjord in Norway. This taxon was regarded as a subspecies of Lycodes vahlii but is now considered to be a valid species. The specific name gracilis means "slender" and is a reference to the less robust body of this fish compared to its known relatives in 1867.

== Description ==
Lycodes gracilis has a light grey to dark brown overall colour, marked with up to 31 small black spots along the flanks, these may be absent or not very conspicuous. There are up to 10, typicallu between none and 4, dark bands on the anterior of the dorsal fin. The peritoneum is black. The elongate body has a depth at the origin of the anal fin equivalent to between 5% and 12% of the total length. This ia a long tailed eelpout, with the distance from the snout to the anal fin being between 35% and 47% of the total length. The head is small, between 15% and 24% of the total length and the teeth are blunt and thick. The dorsal fin origin is above the centre of the pectoral fin, this fin is rounded and of moderate length and has between 15 and 21 fin rays. The [[lateral line]] system has three lines, with the lowest ventral line being the most obvious The head bears small pores and scales cloth the whole of the body and fin bases, other than the belly.This species has been reported to attain a total length of 56 cm (22 in) in the North Sea.

== Distribution and habitat ==
Lycodes gracilis is found in the eastern North Atlantic Ocean and adjoining Arctic Ocean from eastern Greenland and Iceland north to Svalbard, east to the southern Barents Sea and south to the Shetland Islands and the Kattegat and Skagerrak. This species is an epibenthic or mesobenthic fish found on mud substrates at depths between 50 and 540 m (160 and 1,770 ft) where the water temperature is between −0.6 and 7.5 °C (30.9 and 45.5 °F) Lycodes gracilis is commonest on the continental shelf af depths of 200 to 250 m (660 to 820 ft) in the North Sea and Kattegat and between 200 and 300 m (660 and 980 ft) in Norwegian waters.
