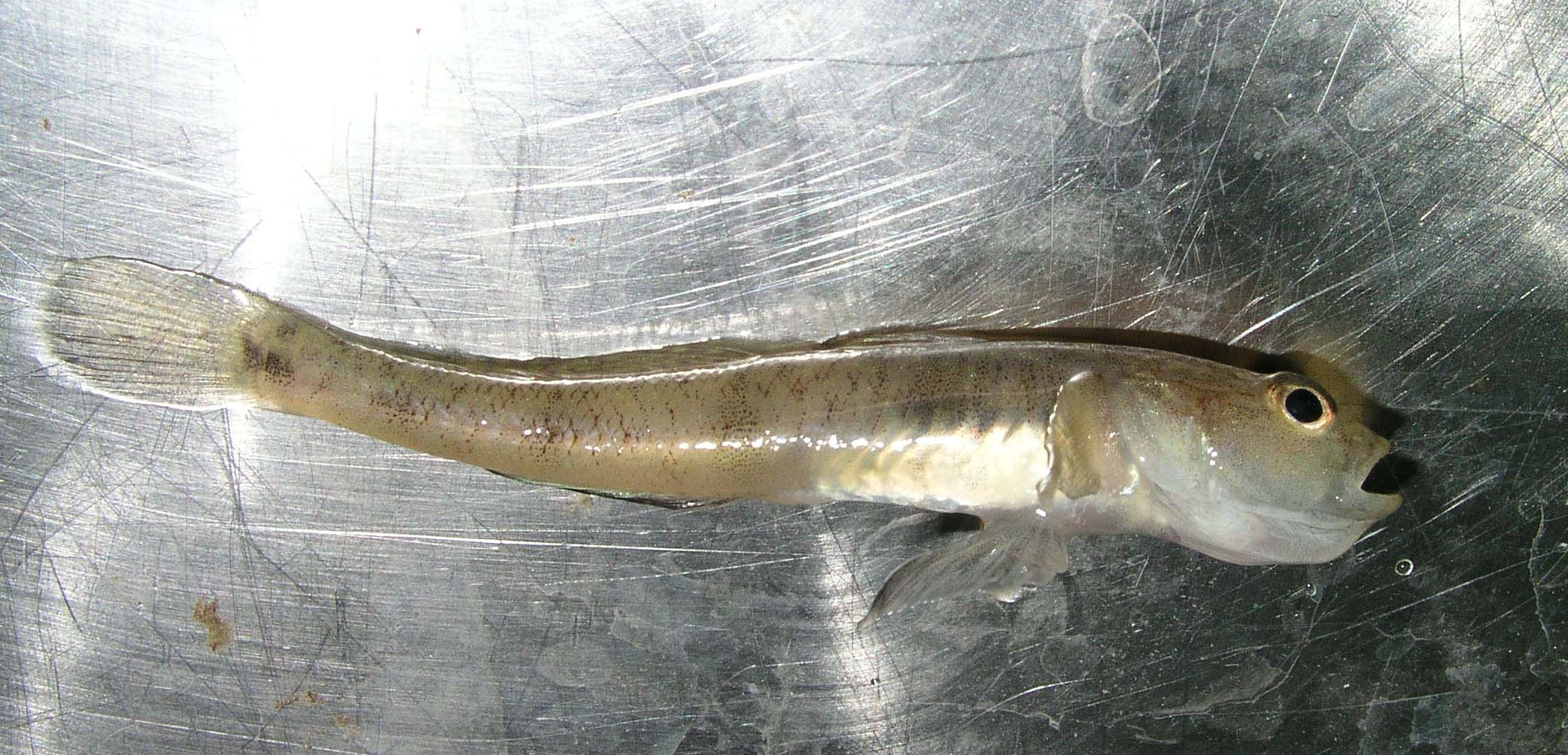
- Sand Goby (P. minutus), the type species of the genus

Scientific classification
- Kingdom: Animalia
- Phylum: Chordata
- Class: Actinopterygii
- Division: Teleostei
- Order: Gobiiformes
- Family: Oxudercidae
- Subfamily: Gobionellinae
- Genus: Pomatoschistus; T. N. Gill, 1863

Type species
- Gobius minutus Pallas, 1770

Synonyms
- Chaparrudo de Buen, 1931; Engrauligobius Iljin, 1930; Gobiusculus Duncker, 1928; Iljinia de Buen, 1930; Syrrhothonus Chabanaud, 1933

= Pomatoschistus =

Pomatoschistus Temporal range: Miocene – present

Genus of fishes

Pomatoschistus is a genus of gobies native to fresh, brackish and marine waters of Europe, the eastern Atlantic Ocean and the Mediterranean Sea.

== Species ==
There are currently 14 recognized species in this genus:

- Pomatoschistus adriaticus Miller, 1973
- Pomatoschistus anatoliae Engin & Innal, 2017
- Pomatoschistus bathi P. J. Miller, 1982 (Bath's goby)
- †Pomatoschistus bunyatovi Bratishko et al. 2015 (fossil, Miocene of Kazakhstan)
- Pomatoschistus flavescens (Fabricius, 1779
- Pomatoschistus knerii (Steindachner, 1861) (Kner's goby)
- Pomatoschistus lozanoi (F. de Buen, 1923) (Lozano's goby)
- Pomatoschistus marmoratus (A. Risso, 1810) (Marbled goby)
- Pomatoschistus microps (Krøyer, 1838) (Common goby)
- Pomatoschistus minutus (Pallas, 1770) (Sand goby)
- Pomatoschistus nanus Engin & Seyhan, 2017
- Pomatoschistus norvegicus (Collett, 1902) (Norway goby)
- Pomatoschistus pictus (Malm, 1865) (Painted goby)
- Pomatoschistus quagga (Heckel, 1837) (Quagga goby)
- Pomatoschistus tortonesei P. J. Miller, 1969 (Tortonese's goby)
