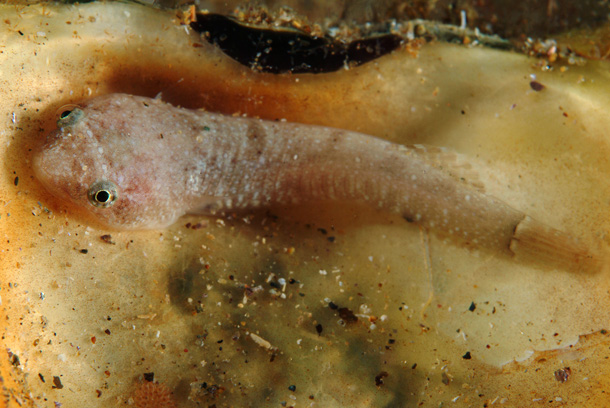

Conservation status
- Least Concern (IUCN 3.1)

Scientific classification
- Kingdom: Animalia
- Phylum: Chordata
- Class: Actinopterygii
- Order: Blenniiformes
- Family: Gobiesocidae
- Genus: Diplecogaster
- Species: D. bimaculata

Binomial name
- Diplecogaster bimaculata (Bonnaterre, 1788)

Synonyms
- Cyclopterus bimaculatus Bonnaterre, 1788; Lepadogaster ocellatus Risso, 1810; Lepadogaster reticulatus Risso, 1810; Lepadogaster mirbeli Risso, 1820; Lepadogaster desfontanii Risso, 1827; Lepadogaster urifasciatus Costa, 1840; Lepadogaster latirostris Costa, 1840; Lepadogaster norvegicus Düben, 1845; Lepadogaster raninus Nardo, 1847; Lepadogaster listellus Nardo, 1847; Lepadogaster maculatus Guichenot, 1850; Mirbelia maculata (Guichenot, 1850); Lepadogaster punctatus Guichenot, 1850; Lepadogaster elegans Nardo, 1860; Lepadogaster couchii Saville-Kent, 1883

= Diplecogaster bimaculata =

Species of fish

Diplecogaster bimaculata, the two-spotted clingfish, is a species of fish in the family Gobiesocidae found in Black Sea, Mediterranean Sea and Atlantic Ocean where it is found on rocks and among seagrass or shell beds.

== Description ==
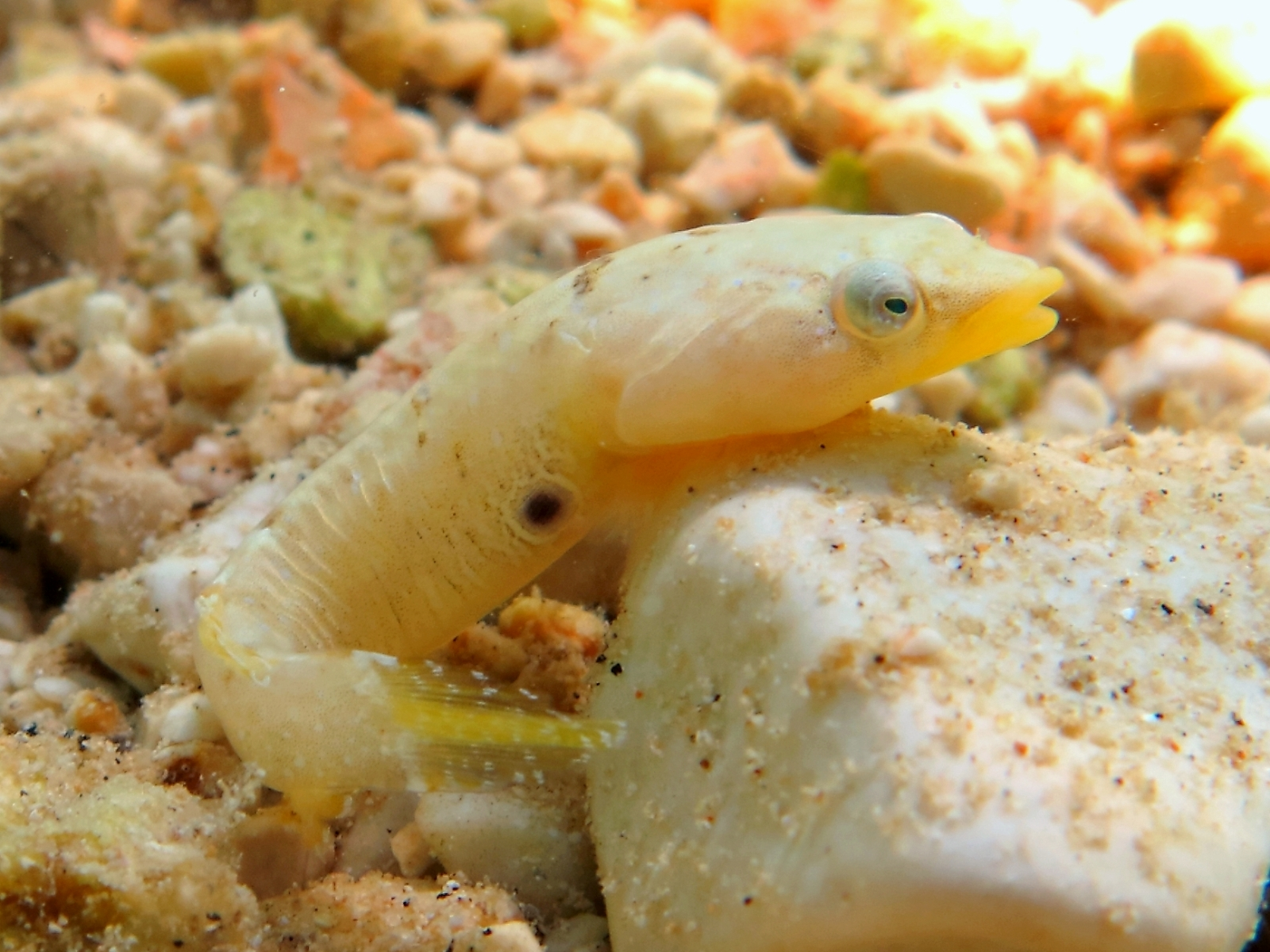
Male, Croatia

The species has pelvic fins modified to create a sucker which is used for clinging to rocks or other hard surfaces. It shows variable colouration and its body is frequently coloured red and is spotted with violet, blue, brown or yellow, and they have a yellowish ventral surface. They are sexually dimorphic and the males show a purple spot, surrounded by yellow, immediately to the rear of their pectoral fin. It has a flattened body and a small head, which is roughly triangular in shape. The single dorsal and anal fin are situated posteriorly near to the tail and both are separate from the caudal fin which sits at the end of a long caudal peduncle. It has large eyes and a short snout which ends in large, fleshy lips and very small gill openings. This is a small fish which grows to 6 centimetres (2.4 in) in total length. D. bimaculata can be confused with the similar Apletodon dentatus, although the two-spotted clingfish extends much further north than the small-headed clingfish, and the best way to distinguish them is from their teeth, which in this species are small and conical and grow in patches and there are no large canine teeth.

== Distribution ==
Diplecogaster bimaculata is found in the northeastern Atlantic from Trøndelag in Norway and the Faroes south to Gibraltar; its range includes Madeira, the Azores and the Canary Islands, as well as the Mediterranean Sea as far east as the Adriatic Sea.

== Habitat and biology ==
Most commonly found in areas of rocky substrates, D. bimaculata is also frequently spotted in beds of seagrasses and bivalve banks, where there is an abundance of empty mollusc shells for the fish to shelter in. It has been recorded from the intertidal zone down to depths of 55 metres (180 ft). The eggs are laid in the spring and summer with the parents guarding the egg mass, which is normally laid under a stone or in an empty shell. The larvae and the juvenile fish are pelagic but quickly move to a benthic habit. The major part of its diet is small crustaceans. It has been photographed cleaning a Mediterranean moray (Muraena helena).

== Name ==
It was described as Cyclopterus bimaculatus in 1788 by Pierre Joseph Bonnaterre and was designated as the type species of the genus Diplecogaster by Alec Fraser-Brunner in 1938. The specific name bimaculata refers to the two dark spots on either side of the adhesive sucker while the generic name is a compound of di meaning "two", pleco meaning "fold" and gaster meaning belly, a reference to the double-type sucker of this genus.

== See also ==
- List of fish of Ireland
- List of fish in Sweden
- List of British Isles rockpool life
- List of fish in Ukraine
- List of fish of the Black Sea
- List of fish of the Mediterranean Sea
