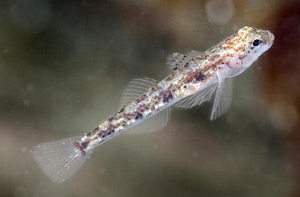

Conservation status
- Least Concern (IUCN 3.1)

Scientific classification
- Domain: Eukaryota
- Kingdom: Animalia
- Phylum: Chordata
- Class: Actinopterygii
- Order: Gobiiformes
- Family: Gobiidae
- Genus: Pomatoschistus
- Species: P. pictus

Binomial name
- Pomatoschistus pictus (Malm, 1865)

Synonyms
- Gobius pictus Malm, 1865; Pomatoschistus pictus pictus (Malm, 1865); Gobius rhodopterus Günther, 1861; Gobius affinis Kolombatović, 1891; Pomatoschistus pictus adriaticus P. J. Miller, 1973

= Painted goby =

Species of fish

The painted goby (Pomatoschistus pictus) is a small goby of Western European waters from Trondheim Fjord to Spain, the Canary Islands and is sometimes reported in the Mediterranean Sea. Also mentioned in the Black Sea. It lives at depths from 1 to 55 metres (3.3 to 180.4 ft), preferring a gravelly or sandy environment. Its young may sometimes be found in tide pools. It feeds on amphipods and copepods.

== Description ==
The painted goby is a relatively small goby, only growing to 6 cm in length, although some may grow to 9.5 cm. It is fawn-brown, with a row of four double dark brown spots along the sides. The dorsal fin has rows of dark brown-black spots interspersed with bands of iridescent blue and pink.
