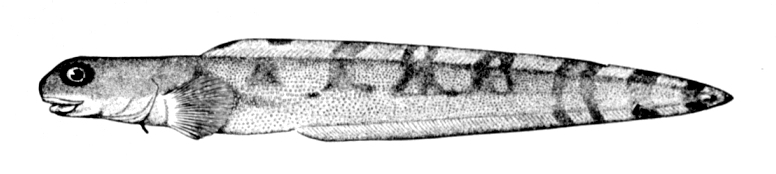

Scientific classification
- Kingdom: Animalia
- Phylum: Chordata
- Class: Actinopterygii
- Division: Teleostei
- Order: Perciformes
- Family: Zoarcidae
- Genus: Lycodes
- Species: L. vahlii

Binomial name
- Lycodes vahlii Reinhardt, 1831

Synonyms
- Lycodes zoarchus Goode & Bean, 1896; Lycodes vahlii pallida Smitt, 1901; Lycodes vahlii maculatus Vladykov & Tremblay, 1936

= Lycodes vahlii =

Species of fish

Lycodes vahlii, Vahl's eelpout or the checker eelpout, is a species of marine ray-finned fish belonging to the family Zoarcidae, the eelpouts. It is native to coasts of Northern Atlantic Ocean.

== Taxonomy ==
Lycodes vahlii was first formally described in 1831 by the Norwegian zoologist Johannes Christopher Hagemann Reinhardt with its type locality given as Julianehåb in Greenland. When Reinhardt described this species he classified it within a new monospecific genus, Lycodes, although many species have subsequently been included in this genus and L. vahlii is the type species of Lycodes and thus of the subfamily Lycodinae. The specific name honours the Danish botanist and pharmacist Jens Laurentius Moestue Vahl, who gave his collection of plant and fish specimens to the University of Copenhagen, where Reinhardt held the post of Professor of Zoology. Lycodes gracilis of the eastern Atlantic was considered to be conspecific with L. vahli but is now treated as a separate species, the common name Vahl's eelpout being applied to this species by some authorities.

== Description ==
Lycodes vahlii varies in color from olive green to dark brown, paler on the belly, with between 5 and 12 dark bands on the body which continue onto the dorsal fin. The front bands are frequently notably darker than the rear bands. The inside of the mouth and the peritoneum are brown. It has an elongate body which has a depth at the origin of the anal fin 7% to 11% of the total length and it has a long tail with the distance from the snout to the origin of the anal fin being36& to 44% of the total length. The head is moderately long and its length is between 15% and 24% of the total length. The rather short and rounded pectoral fins have between 18 and 20 fin rays and their length is equivalent to between 89% and 15% of the total length. The lateral line runs close to the anal fin. There are small pores on the head and there is a dense covering of scales on the body, including the abdomen, but on the forward parts of the bases of the dorsal, anal and pectoral fins are naked. The teeth are blunt. The maximum published total length is 57 cm (22 in) but it is typically between 35 and 40 cm (14 and 16 in).

== Distribution and habitat ==
Lycodes vahlii is found in the western Atlantic and nearby Arctic Oceans off eastern Canada and western Greenland. It is an epibenthic to mesobenthic species which lives on soft substrates at depths between 39 and 1,200 m (128 and 3,937 ft) where the water temperature is 1.4 to 5.8 °C (34.5 to 42.4 °F). Specimens are rarely taken from depths of less than 200 m (660 ft) although in the Gulf of St. Lawrence it is found at between 100 and 300 m (330 and 980 ft).

== Biology ==
Lycodes vahlii hunts prey within the substrate, shrimp and krill becoming more important prey items as the size of the fish increases. The females lay large eggs, with a diameter 6 mm (0.24 in), onto the substrate.
