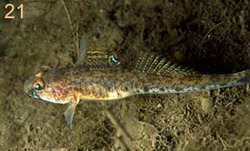

Conservation status
- Least Concern (IUCN 3.1)

Scientific classification
- Domain: Eukaryota
- Kingdom: Animalia
- Phylum: Chordata
- Class: Actinopterygii
- Order: Gobiiformes
- Family: Gobiidae
- Genus: Pomatoschistus
- Species: P. norvegicus

Binomial name
- Pomatoschistus norvegicus (Collett, 1902)

Synonyms
- Gobius minutus norvegicus Collett, 1902; Gobius fagei de Buen, 1923

= Norway goby =

Species of fish

Pomatoschistus norvegicus, the Norway goby, is a species of goby native to the eastern Atlantic from Lofoten to the western English Channel and has also been recorded from the Mediterranean Sea. It occurs in offshore waters at depths of from 18 to 325 metres (59 to 1,066 ft), being found on substrates of mud or coarse shell fragments. This species can reach a length of 8 centimetres (3.1 in) TL.
