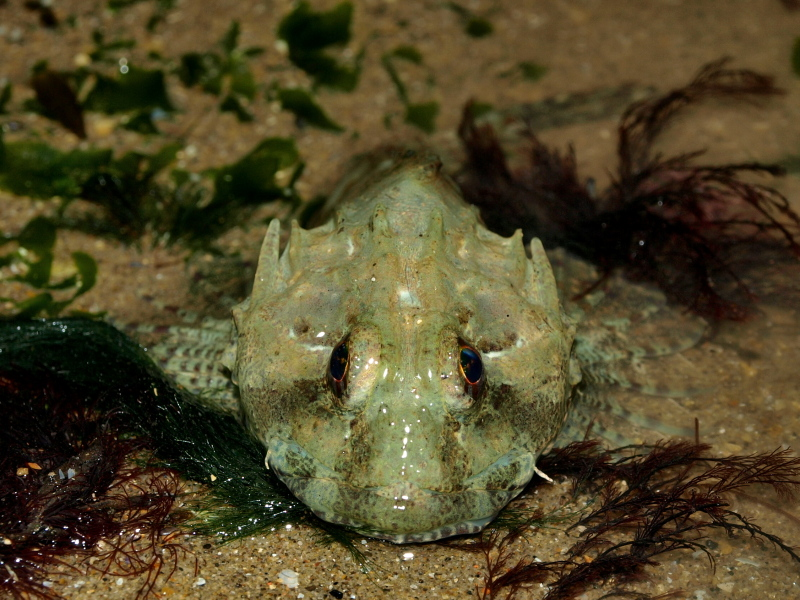
- Longspined bullhead. Photographed at Scarborough, North Yorkshire

Conservation status
- Least Concern (IUCN 3.1)

Scientific classification
- Kingdom: Animalia
- Phylum: Chordata
- Class: Actinopterygii
- Order: Perciformes
- Suborder: Cottoidei
- Superfamily: Cottoidea
- Family: Psychrolutidae
- Genus: Taurulus; Gratzianov, 1907
- Species: T. bubalis

Binomial name
- Taurulus bubalis (Euphrasén, 1786)
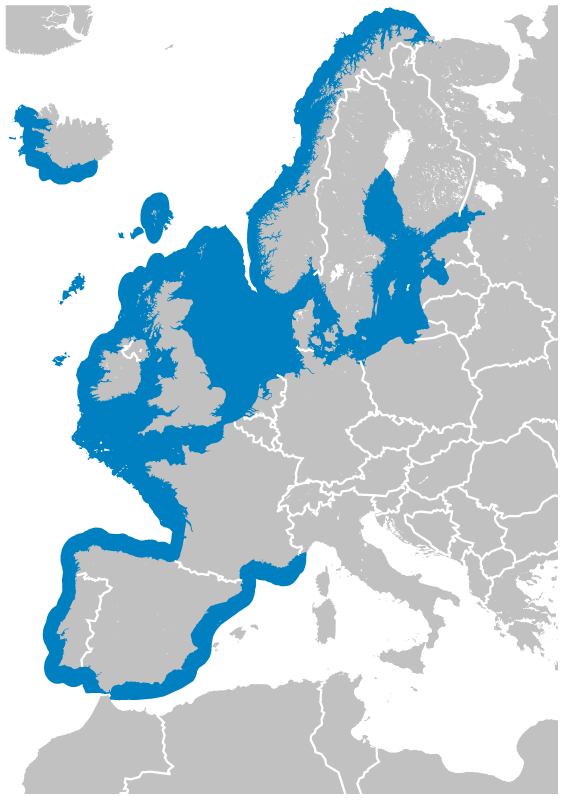
- Longspined bullhead range.

Synonyms
- Cottus bubalis Euphrasen, 1786; Acanthocottus bubalis (Euphrasen, 1786); Aspicottus bubalis (Euphrasen, 1786); Ceratocottus bubalis (Euphrasen, 1786); Enophrys bubalis (Euphrasen, 1786); Myoxocephalus bubalis (Euphrasen, 1786); Cottus maculatus Fischer, 1885

= Longspined bullhead =

Species of fish

The long-spined bullhead (Taurulus bubalis), also known as the long-spined sea-scorpion, and the long-spined scorpion fish is a coastal fish of the sculpin family Cottidae, inhabiting marine waters of Europe.

== Taxonomy ==
The longspined bullhead was first formally described as Cottus bubalis in 1786 by the Swedish biologist Bengt Anders Euphrasén with its type locality given as Bohuslän in Sweden. In 1907 the Russian ichthyologist Valerii Ivanovich Gratzianov classified this species in the monospecific subgenus Taurulus of the genus Myoxocephalus, Taurulus is now recognised as a valid genus. The 5th edition of Fishes of the World classifies this genus in the subfamily Cottinae of the family Cottidae but other authorities classify it in the subfamily Myoxocephalinae of the family Psychrolutidae.

== Description ==
The longspined bullhead is a small fish with a thick, tapering body and a large head and resembles the shorthorn sculpin (Myoxocephalus scorpius). It has two spines on each side on the gill cover, the front one extending further than the rear one. The skin is not clad in scales. There is a row of bony tubercles running along the flank on the lateral line and there are backward sloping bony tubercles on the crown of the head. It has a variety of colours ranging from shades of brown or olive green, with cream blotches and four dark, vertical bands. The belly is pale bluish-green but becomes suffused with red in males in the breeding season.

== Behaviour ==
Bullhead are predators that will eat prawns, molluscs and small fish such as gobies and blennies. Despite their small size they are aggressive and will attack fish bigger than themselves. They lie in wait for prey, camouflaged against rocks and weed before striking out at anything that passes. Like all fish in the family Cottidae, the bullhead does not have a swim bladder, meaning that it sinks as soon as it stops swimming. Breeding takes place in early spring and fertilisation is internal, the eggs are laid in algae and are guarded by the adults. Once the fry hatch, they go offshore for a while, before returning to the coast. The reproduction of this species has not been fully studied however. They can be found from tidal areas to 30 m (1,180 in) down, though they are most common at the coast.

== Other names ==
Other English names for this species include sea scorpion, bullhead, rockfish, rock sculpin, scorpion fish, clobberhead.
