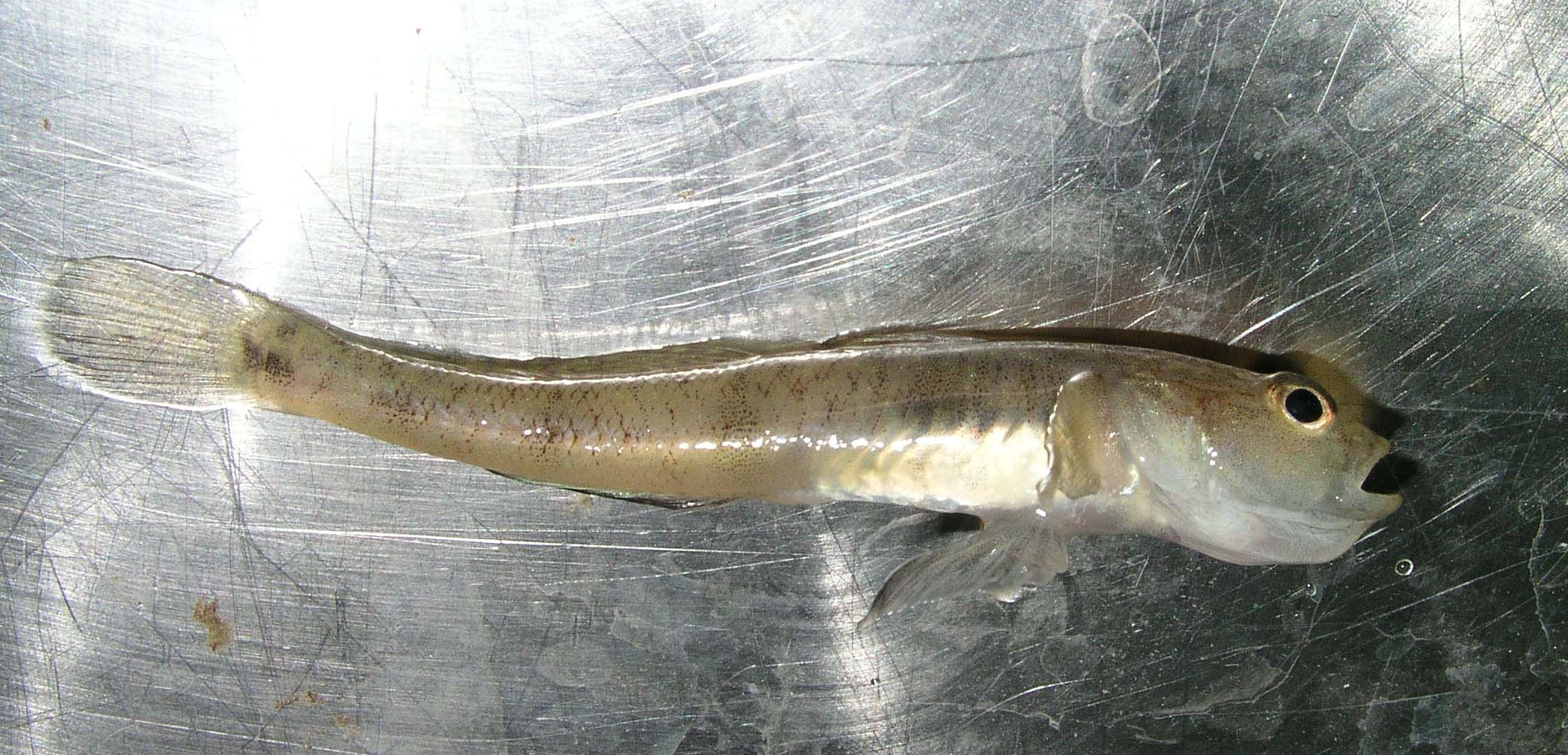

Conservation status
- Least Concern (IUCN 3.1)

Scientific classification
- Kingdom: Animalia
- Phylum: Chordata
- Class: Actinopterygii
- Division: Teleostei
- Order: Gobiiformes
- Family: Oxudercidae
- Genus: Pomatoschistus
- Species: P. minutus

Binomial name
- Pomatoschistus minutus (Pallas, 1770)

Synonyms
- Gobius minutus Pallas, 1770; Pomatoschistus minutus minutus (Pallas, 1770); Gobius gracilis Jenyns, 1835; Gobius unipunctatus Parnell, 1838; Gobius ekstromii Günther, 1861; Gobius elongatus Canestrini, 1862; Pomatoschistus minutus elongatus (Canestrini, 1862); Gobius gracilis Cabrera, Pérez & Haenseler, 1868; Gobius cobitiformis Kessler, 1874; Gobius taalmankipii Hubrecht, 1878; Gobius minutus major Heincke, 1880; Gobius minutus guitelli É. Le Danois, 1913

= Sand goby =

Species of fish

The sand goby (Pomatoschistus minutus), also known as a polewig or pollybait, is a species of ray-finned fish native to marine and brackish European waters from the Baltic Sea through the Mediterranean Sea and into the Black Sea where it occurs in sandy or muddy areas of inshore waters at depths of from 4 to 200 metres (13 to 656 ft). This species can reach a length of 11 centimetres (4.3 in) TL. This species is sometimes kept in public aquariums. The sand goby is of a sandy colour, with darker markings on the sides and a creamy-white underside. In the breeding season the male fish has a blue spot at the rear of the first dorsal fin, ringed with white. The fish has a slender body, and the head is about a quarter of the total length.

== Description ==
The sand goby has two dorsal fins with a wider gap between them than the common goby (Pomatoschistus microps), the anterior one consisting of six soft spines and the posterior one eight to eleven soft rays. The pelvic fins are fused with the anal fins. There are 58 to 72 scales along the lateral line and these scales are rather smaller than those of the common goby. The caudal fin is rounded. In males, there is a conspicuous dark spot on the anterior dorsal fin and in both sexes there is a black patch on the caudal peduncle. The general colour is sandy brown with indistinct dark blotches and reticulations on the dorsal surface and dark striations on the pale fins. The colour of the male darkens during the breeding season and his fins become more coloured. The average size is about 4 to 5 cm (1.6 to 2.0 in).

== Behaviour ==
The sand goby normally lives at greater depths than the common goby. It feeds on small invertebrates living on the seabed especially amphipods. It is well camouflaged and lies motionless on the bottom waiting for its prey to approach. It breeds in the summer, the male building a nest usually under a shell (which can be turned over if necessary). The female lays the eggs on the underside of this.
