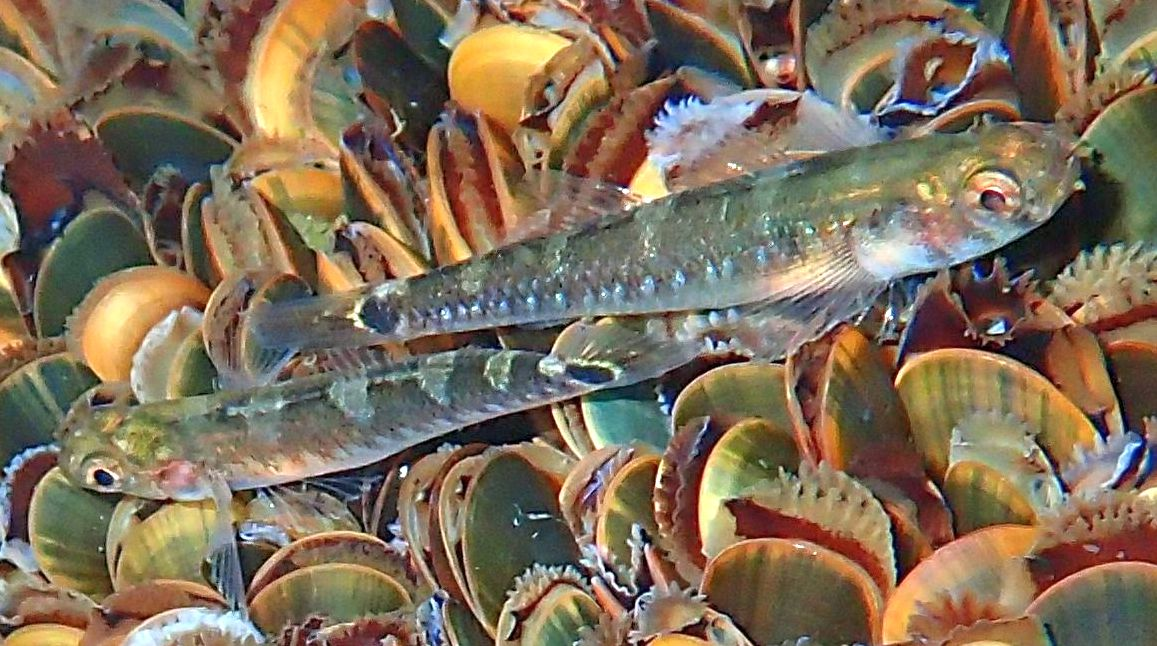

Conservation status
- Least Concern (IUCN 3.1)

Scientific classification
- Kingdom: Animalia
- Phylum: Chordata
- Class: Actinopterygii
- Order: Gobiiformes
- Family: Oxudercidae
- Genus: Pomatoschistus; Duncker, 1928
- Species: P. flavescens

Binomial name
- Pomatoschistus flavescens (J. C. Fabricius, 1779)

Synonyms
- Genus: Chaparrudo de Buen, 1931; Species: Gobius flavescens Fabricius, 1779; Coryphopterus flavescens (Fabricius, 1779); Gobius ruuthensparri Euphrasen, 1786; Gobiusculus flavescens (Fabricius, 1779)

= Two-spotted goby =

Species of fish

The two-spotted goby (Pomatoschistus flavescens) is a species of goby native to marine and brackish waters of the eastern Atlantic Ocean where it can be found from the Faroe Islands and Norway to the northwestern coast of Spain. It has also been recorded from Estonia though records from the Mediterranean Sea are uncertain. They are common on all coasts of the United Kingdom. This species can reach a length of 6 centimetres (2.4 in) TL.

== Habitat ==
This fish prefers to inhabit areas with plenty of weed growth, being found on overgrown structures and in beds of Laminaria or Zostera. They are found in intertidal pools and shallow water to a depth of 20 m.

== Description ==
Pomatoschistus flavescens are small, slender gobies, reaching up to 6 cm in length. They are distinct from other gobies in that their eyes are on the side of the head (lateral) rather than on top (dorsal). There is a black spot at the base of the tail fin, and in the males, there is a second, smaller black spot beneath the pectoral fins. They are reddish to greenish brown in colour, paler on the undersides with dark reticulations dorsally. There are four light 'saddle' marks dorsally from the head to the end of the second dorsal fin. Along the midline of the sides are a series of bluish markings. During the breeding season these markings become extremely bright in the males.

== Behaviour ==
Unlike most gobies, this species does not live on the seabed but instead lives in shoals among seagrasses and seaweeds. It feeds on zooplankton such as crustacean larvae. Breeding takes place in the summer. The male becomes territorial and defend a nest formed by a natural cavity such as an empty mussel shell or a folded kelp leaf. Males and females engage in several stages of mutual courtship displays, the last of which is a visit to the nest, in which the female lays a batch of eggs. The male then guards, cleans and fans the eggs of one to several females until they hatch. After a period of growth in the summer, the juvenile fish move into deeper water to spend the winter. The adults usually die after reproducing once.
