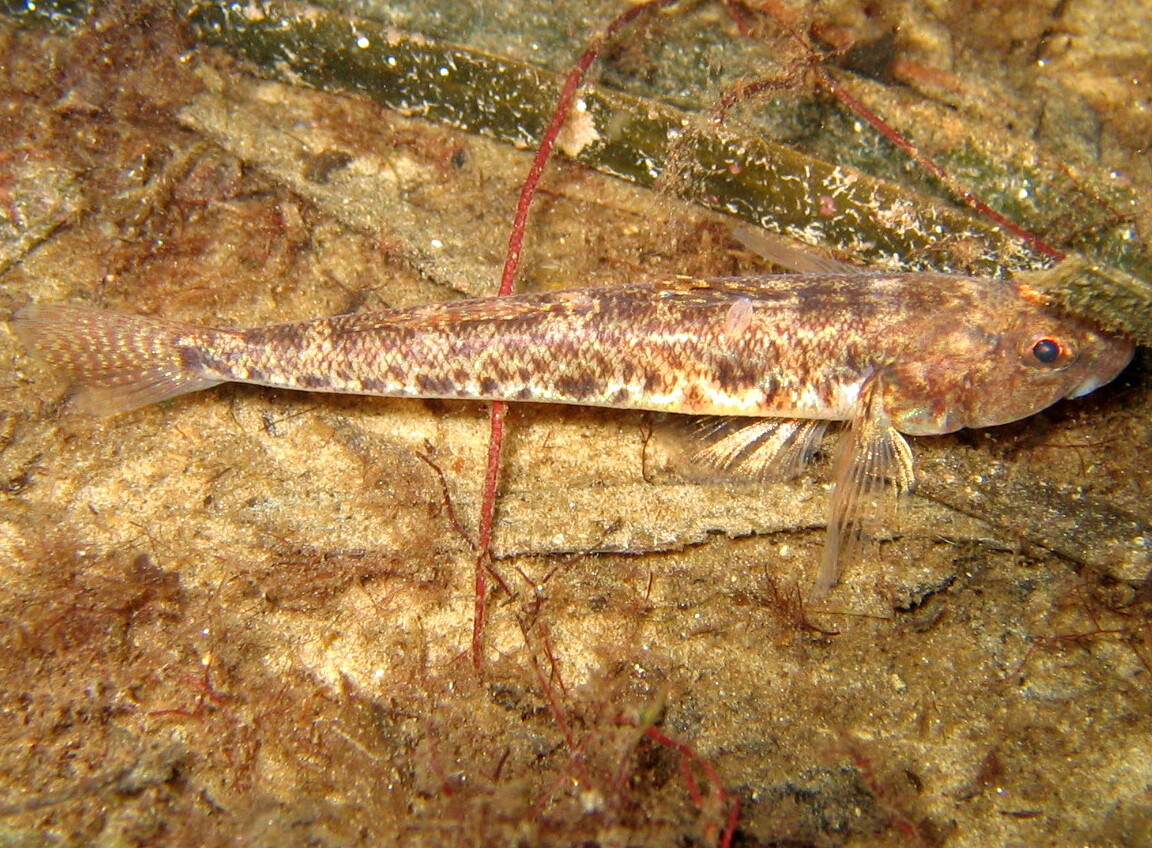

Conservation status
- Least Concern (IUCN 3.1)

Scientific classification
- Kingdom: Animalia
- Phylum: Chordata
- Class: Actinopterygii
- Order: Gobiiformes
- Family: Oxudercidae
- Genus: Pomatoschistus
- Species: P. microps

Binomial name
- Pomatoschistus microps (Krøyer, 1838)

Synonyms
- Gobius microps Krøyer, 1838; Gobius microps microps Krøyer, 1838; Pomatoschistus microps microps (Krøyer, 1838); Gobius pusillus J. Lowe, 1874; Gobius minutus minor Heincke, 1880; Gobius parnelli F. Day, 1881; Gobius laticeps Moreau, 1881; Gobius microps puckensis Lawacz, 1965

= Common goby =

Species of fish

The common goby (Pomatoschistus microps) is a species of ray-finned fish native to fresh and brackish waters along the Atlantic and Baltic Sea coasts of Europe and northern Africa, with a range stretching from Norway to Morocco and Mauritania. It is also found in the Canary Islands. This species reaches a maximum length of 9 centimetres (3.5 in) TL.

== Description ==
The common goby has two dorsal fins with a narrow gap between them, the anterior one consisting of six to eight spines and the posterior one eight to eleven soft rays. The pelvic fins are fused. There are 39 to 51 scales along the lateral line and these scales are slightly larger than those of the sand goby (Pomatoschistus minutus). The caudal fin is rounded. In males, there is a conspicuous dark spot on the anterior dorsal fin and dark markings at the base of the pectorals and the caudal fin. Otherwise the colour is light grey or sandy brown with indistinct dark markings and dark striations on the pale fins. The colour of the male darkens during the breeding season and his fins become more coloured. The average size is about 4 to 5 cm (1.6 to 2.0 in) with a maximum of about 9 cm (3.5 in)

== Habits ==
The common goby breeds from February to September, laying its eggs under shells, stones or on aquatic plants. The male then guards the eggs until they hatch about nine days later. Common gobies can live for up to three years. They inhabit sandy- or muddy-bottomed shallow areas in estuaries or brackish lagoons at depths of from 0 to 12 metres (0 to 39 ft). Their diet is mostly small crustaceans, worms, harpacticoids, amphipods, chironomid larvae and mites. The common goby is normally found in similar locations but shallower water than the sand goby.
