= Smooth sandeel =

Conservation status
- Least Concern (IUCN 3.1)

Scientific classification
- Domain: Eukaryota
- Kingdom: Animalia
- Phylum: Chordata
- Class: Actinopterygii
- Order: Labriformes
- Family: Ammodytidae
- Genus: Gymnammodytes
- Species: G. semisquamatus

Binomial name
- Gymnammodytes semisquamatus (Jourdain, 1879)

Synonyms
- Ammodytes semisquamatus Jourdain, 1879

Species of ray-finned fish

The smooth sandeel (Gymnammodytes semisquamatus) is a species of sand eel in the family Ammodytidae.

== Description ==
It maximum length is 30 cm (12 in), typical adults measuring 15 cm (5.9 in). It has 53–56 dorsal soft rays and 26–31 anal soft rays. Its palate has no pointed teeth, its lateral line is branched, and only the posterior third of the body is scaly (hence the specific name semisquamatus, "half-scaled"). It has 64–72 vertebrae and is golden brown or pink, with a silvery belly. It is also notable for its plectrum-shaped eye.

== Distribution and habitat ==
It is a demersal fish living in the waters off Great Britain, Ireland and in the North Sea. It made its first appearance in the Mediterranean Sea in 1990 off the Spanish coast, where there is now a stable population co-occurring with Gymnammodytes cicerelus.

== Behaviour ==
The smooth sandeel spawns in summer. It feeds on the plankton.
