= Bleekeria =

Two genera are named Bleekeria after Pieter Bleeker:

- Bleekeria, a genus of fishes in the family Ammodytidae.
- A synonym for the genus Alchornea of flowering plants.
