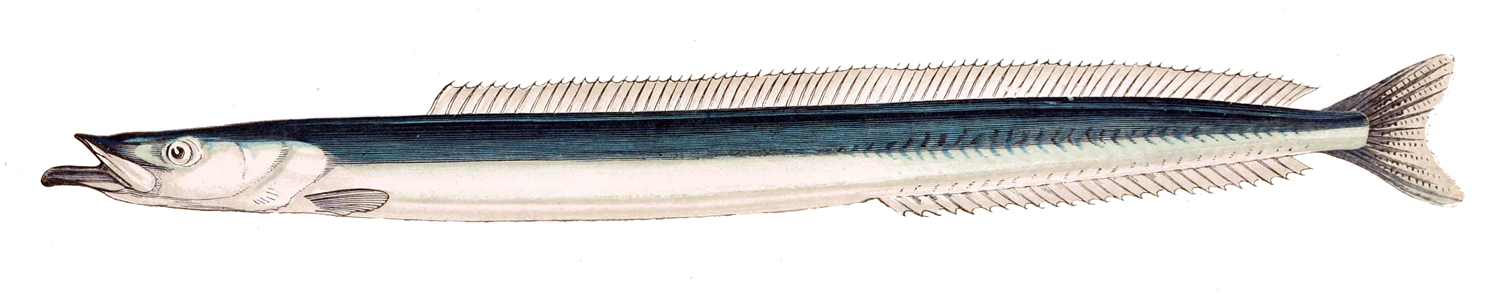

Conservation status
- Least Concern (IUCN 3.1)

Scientific classification
- Kingdom: Animalia
- Phylum: Chordata
- Class: Actinopterygii
- Order: Labriformes
- Family: Ammodytidae
- Genus: Hyperoplus
- Species: H. lanceolatus

Binomial name
- Hyperoplus lanceolatus (Le Sauvage, 1824)

Synonyms
- Ammodytes lanceolatus Le Sauvage, 1824

= Great sand eel =

Species of fish

The great sand eel or great sandeel (Hyperoplus lanceolatus) is the largest species of sand eel. The maximum size is 35 centimetres (14 in).

== Description ==
The great sand eel has an elongated body, with a rounded cross section. It has a long, pointed head, and a protruding lower jaw. Its upper jaw, however, is not protrusible, and this species is unable to form a tube with its mouth. A monocle "tooth-shaped" structure can be found at the front of the palate. The scales on the body cannot form a chevron pattern. The skin ridge running the length of the sides of the body, spread as far as one-third of the base of the anal fin. Low and long set dorsal fins consist of 52 to 61 rays. The anal fin is about half the size of the dorsal fin, and taller. The pectoral fins are diminutive; the pelvic fins are absent. Color ranges from a lime color on the back and upper sides to the bright silver on the lower sides and the belly. Also, a specific black smudge occurs between the eyes and the snout, which is about the same size as the diameter of the eye.

The great sand eel can be distinguished from the lesser sand eel because the former's long dorsal fin is located posterior to the pectoral fins. Corbin's sand eel (Hyperoplus immaculatus) is very similar to the greater sand eel in the way that it lacks a protrusible upper jaw and its similar size. However, it can be distinguished by the lack of the black spot on the snout, but it does have a black chin. Its dorsal fin has 59 to 62 rays. The overall color is darker than the other sand eels, it is found offshore, and tends to be found more on the western side of the United Kingdom

== Biology ==
Breeding occurs between March and August. It feeds on plankton, fish larvae, and a vast range of crustaceans.

== Distribution and habitat ==
The great sand eel is native to the eastern North Atlantic from Murmansk (70°N) and Spitzbergen (75°N) southwards to Portugal (38°N) including Iceland and the Baltic Sea. It has not been recorded from the Mediterranean Sea or the Barents Sea. It is to be found from the low water mark down to over 100 metres (330 ft), typically over clean and sandy substrates. Juveniles have occasionally been found between tide marks on sandy shores.

== Ecology ==
Sand eels form an important part of the diet of many sea birds. Excessive fishing of sand eels on an industrial scale in the North Sea has been linked to a decline in the breeding success of kittiwakes, terns, fulmars, and shags. It is also predated upon by cetaceans and other fishes.
