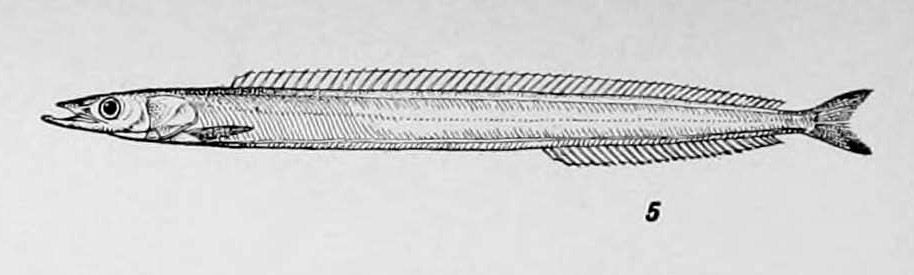
- American sand lance

Scientific classification
- Kingdom: Animalia
- Phylum: Chordata
- Class: Actinopterygii
- Division: Teleostei
- Order: Labriformes
- Family: Ammodytidae
- Genus: Ammodytes
- Species: A. americanus

Binomial name
- Ammodytes americanus DeKay, 1842

= Ammodytes americanus =

Species of fish

Ammodytes americanus, also known as American sand lance, American sand eel, and sand launce, is a small fish in the family Ammodytidae. First described by James Ellsworth De Kay in 1842, it is widespread in the western North Atlantic. The fish typically travel in large schools, spending most of their time relatively near the water surface. It feeds primarily on plankton, though it is known to take small clams and snails from the sea floor, presumably when plankton is scarce. Towards dusk, schools of A. americanus bury themselves in coarse sand, typically from 1 to 6 in (2.5 to 15.2 cm) below the sand's surface close to the water's edge; they avoid rocky areas. They do this to avoid being detected by night-hunting species such as bluefish and stripers.

Ammodytes americanus is an important prey item for many species of fish, whales and birds. Breeding roseate terns, a federally endangered species in the United States, feed their chicks almost exclusively on the species.

== Description ==
Like all sand lances, it has a long, thin body with a pointed snout. Mature fish typically range from 4 to 6 in (10 to 15 cm) in length, though some may reach 7 in (18 cm). It has a long, low dorsal fin (described as "very delicate") that extends along most of its back, folding into a groove at the fin's base when not in use. Its anal fin is roughly the same height as the dorsal fin, and extends over the posterior third of the fish's body. Its pectoral fins are small, and its caudal fin is forked. Its mouth is large and toothless, with a lower jaw that extends well beyond the upper. Fish caught from more northern waters generally have a larger body length than those swimming in southern NWA waters. The coloration of the body is overall greenish silver, with a muted brownish-green dorsal side transitioning to white sides and stomach, a camouflage known as countershading. The visible lateral line splits this color transition as it travels down the body, ending at the caudal peduncle. The operculum is silvery white, matching the stomach. Its eyes are silvery, with a dark pupil. The fins are pale brown and difficult to spot when viewing the fish.

When observing the fish swimming, A. americanus has a sinusoidal swimming motion, creating an “eellike” movement. The swaying undulations start at the head and move down the body. This anguilliform body shape is conducive to eluding prey through being highly mobile and able to shimmy away on the benthic floor.

== Geographic Distribution and Habitat ==
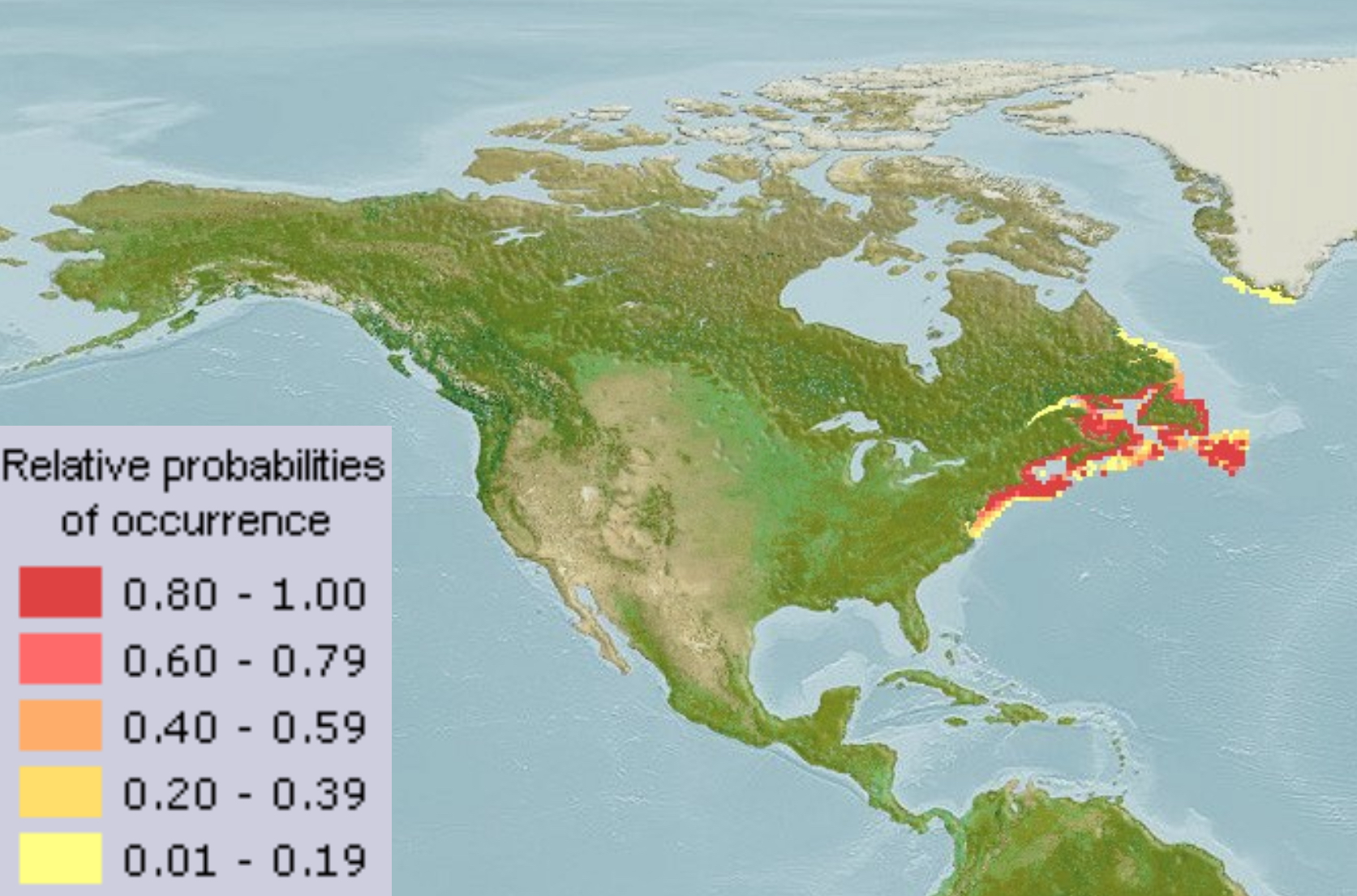
The relative range of the American Sand Lance with a key showing relative probabilities of occurrence

A. americanus has been found from Cape Hatteras, North Carolina, to Labrador in the Northwest Atlantic (NWA) region. Historically, the fish has been found in bays, estuaries, and shallow coastal waters in less than two meters of water. For A. americanus to be in a suitable habitat, there must be a course substrate available for them to burrow into. Substrates that attract the fish incorporate clean grains of sand or gravel, as well as crushed shell. This choice could be due to larger grains being easier to move through as well as the substrate being capable of holding more dissolved oxygen.

== Biology ==
=== Life History ===
During spawning, A. americanus females lost up to 45% of their body weight. The appearance of an egg is opaque, with the size measuring between an average of 0.05-1mm. Inside the egg, a visible yellow yolk and oil globule is present. The spawning period is between December and March and is completed by June, once a year after a female is mature. Gonads in females tend to be more developed than male gonads in December.

Upon hatching, A. americanus is developed with pigmented eyes, a functional mouth, and a complete gut. After hatching, it can be over one hundred days before the first hatchling metamorphoses. Schooling behavior is noted at 90 days, and burrowing behaviors at 133 days. After burying itself in the sand, the fish will remain hidden for days, only to emerge in small groups of two or three and start looking for food. A. americanus exhibit high fecundity, or a high fertility rate, a key part of why they have adapted so well in the zooplankton-scarce, cold winter waters.

=== Growth ===
The standard way of measuring age in fishes is through counting growth rings in the otolith, an inner ear organ that all fishes possess. Opaque rings demonstrate a strong food and nutrient availability in the habitat of the fish, while translucent rings demonstrate a lack of nutrients and food available. The American Sand Lance will deposit an opaque ring every year, from July to September. This deposition period probably relates to an increase in water surface temperature. Additionally, there is a close relationship between the otolith size and fish length. Counting otolith rings is a good indicator of how old this species is. A. americanus, like other Ammodytes species, mature within the first year after hatching. Male A. americanus mature at a smaller size than females, at around 85mm, as opposed to females maturing at around 90cm. There is no notable difference between the final length of the male and female fish, even though the males mature smaller than the females.

=== Diet ===
Ammodytes americanus have been found to primarily eat copepods, small crustaceans, making them zooplanktivorius fishes. These crustaceans provide a main source of nutrients for the sand lances, having been found in 37.8% of stomachs examined in one study. The abundance of other prey varies on the season. Stomach contents during Autumn months reveal a diet of mostly copepods and mysids. During the Spring months, copepods, hydroids, and cumaceans were found, suggestive of benthic feeding. In the Summer months, copepods were still favored. Benthic crustaceans, small snails and crabs, and isopods were also found. Ammodytes species have a preference for copepods, making the sand lance a plankton feeder. A conclusion about when they eat can be drawn from observing if food was present in the stomachs of fish caught at different intervals of time, stretching from day to night. The American Sand Lance was found to be feeding during both the day and night, a behavior not found in all other Ammodytes. In European waters, Ammodytes marinus was found to feed only during the daytime.

=== Behavior ===
The schools that A. americanus form range in individuals from one hundred to many thousand, relatively small for schools of fish. The schools are visually vertically compressed and tightly condensed, with the average distance between two individuals being ½-¾ of a body length. The size of one school measured in Provincetown slope was 1-5 meters wide, 0.5-1.5 meters tall, and 3-20 meters long. Schools swim at a speed of around 30-50 cm/s. This type of school is a stratified school. When preyed upon, the school will split or accelerate to one side to avoid whatever they deem as a predator. When disturbed, the fish will split into small groups and swim down to the bottom. They start to burrow into the sand at a 60°-75° angle until they switch to a 20°-40° angle once one-quarter of their body is covered. They continue to burrow at the new angle until fully covered. Once covered, the fish will reveal just their head to view their surroundings. Some are even observed to laterally move to a different location and emerge when further disturbed.

=== Comparisons ===
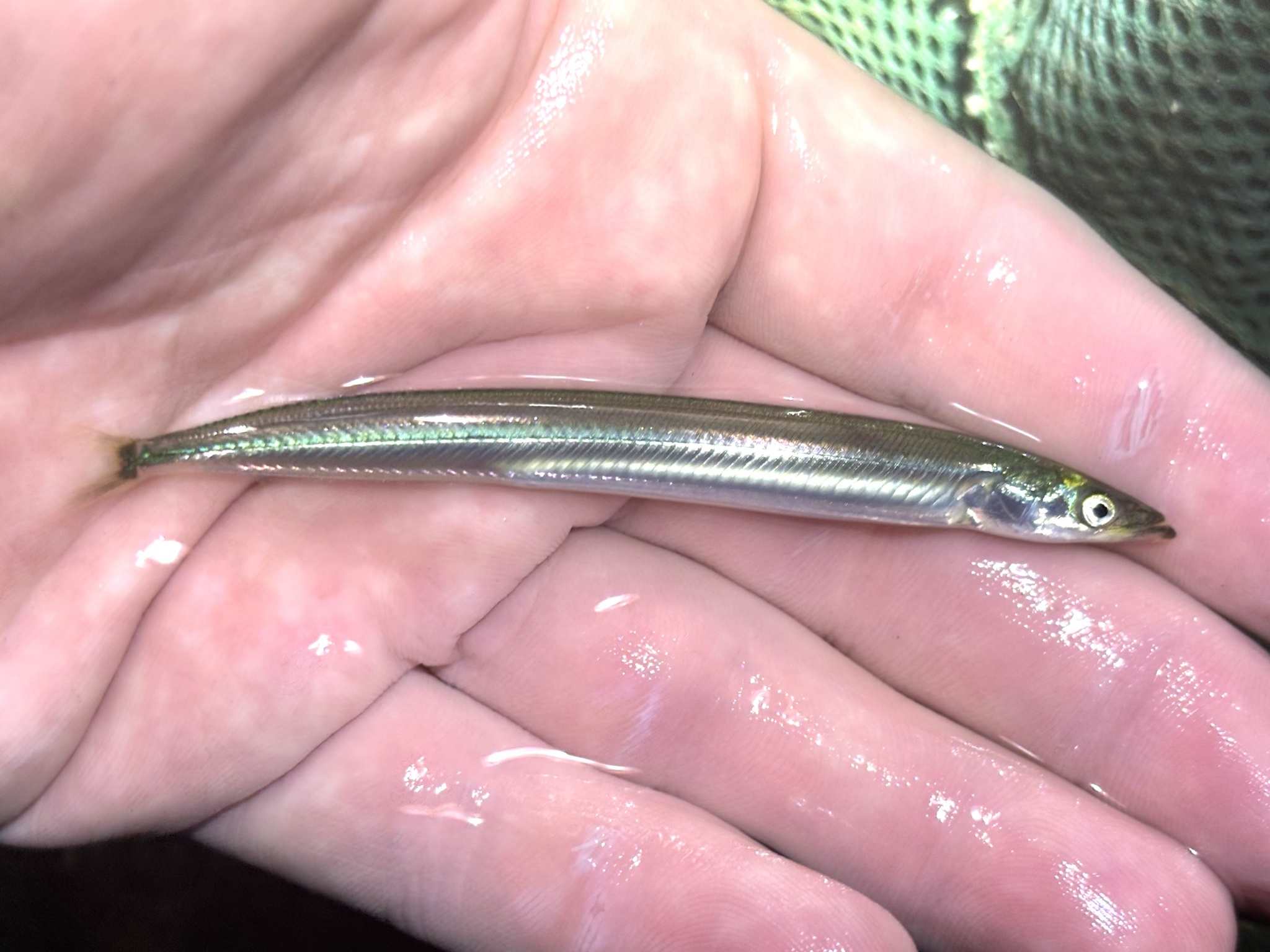
The comparison species, the Northern Sand Lance, being held and photographed

In the Northwestern Atlantic, there are two Ammodytes species. The American sand lance, Ammodytes americanus, is the inshore species, residing closer to the coast in shallower waters. The Northern sand lance, Ammodytes dubius, lives offshore in colder and deeper waters. Meristatic characteristics can be a difficult way of distinguishing the two species, although some differences can be seen. The number of vertebrae and plicae are both lesser in A. americanus than in A. dubius. Additionally, by counting the number of rays on the fins, differences in numbers can be derived. A more modern form of distinguishing between the species is lcWGS (low-coverage whole genome sequencing). With this technique, both mitochondrial and nuclear genomes can be used to differentiate the two species.

== Conservation ==
Ammodytes in the NWA area have been marked as moderately vulnerable to climate change when compared to other marine animals in the region. Due to climate change, the NWA region is undergoing warming. This puts many native species at risk, including A. americanus. When the ocean temperature is higher than in previous years, the timing of spawning and other important life events can become off.

While there are no fisheries targeting the A. americanus, they are affected by fisheries, being swept up as catch in some Northeastern fisheries. Due to regulations put in by the Mid-Atlantic and New England Fishery Management Councils, commercial fishing of A. americanus is restricted to 1,700 lbs. The sand lances in the NWA are prey to many other species, being known as forage fish. Marine mammals, birds, and fish all consume NWA Ammodytes. On record, there have been 45 fish species that have been found with Ammodytes in their stomach contents in the NWA region. Some notable species include the alewife, Atlantic cod, haddock, and longhorn sculpin. Many members of the Charadriiformes family, the shorebirds and pelagic birds, consume Ammodytes. Many species feed Ammodytes to their babies, including a few tern species and Atlantic puffins. Roseate terns, common terns, and razorbills had a stronger connection to the fish, with much of their diet consisting of Ammodytes. The importance of the American Sand Lances is due in part to some seabird species of concern that eat the forage fish. One bird in particular, the roseate tern, nests in very few areas, meaning the risk of extinction is high. The Ammodytes being a part of their main diet means that Ammodytes become a species of importance to monitor as well, even if populations aren’t declining.
