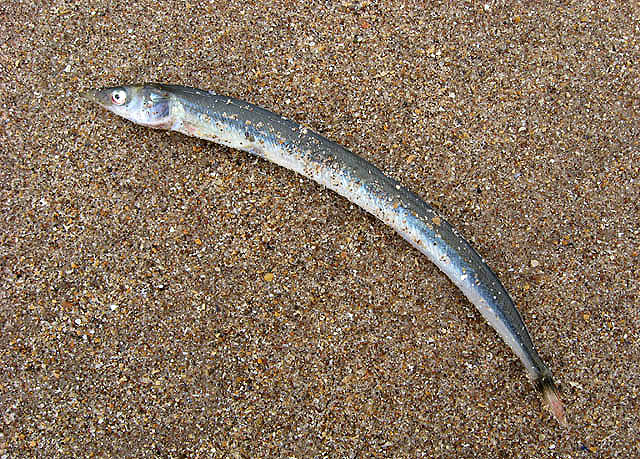

Scientific classification
- Kingdom: Animalia
- Phylum: Chordata
- Class: Actinopterygii
- Division: Teleostei
- Order: Labriformes
- Family: Ammodytidae
- Genus: Ammodytes
- Species: A. marinus

Binomial name
- Ammodytes marinus Raitt, 1934

= Raitt's sand eel =

Species of fish

Raitt's sand eel (Ammodytes marinus), is a small semi-pelagic ray-finned fish found in the North Atlantic Ocean. The Raitt's sand eel is member of the family Ammodytidae which includes all 31 species of sand eels, often referred to as sand lances. Contrary to their name sand eels, including Raitt's sand eel, are not true eels and instead belong to the order of "weever-like" fishes, the Trachiniformes.

== Description ==
The Raitt's sand eel is a small elongated fish that is usually about 20 cm long. The maximum length reported for this species of sand eel is 25 cm. They are silver all over with darker scales on their dorsal side. Raitt's sand eels have a short tail fin that is deeply forked. They have a long and low dorsal fin that is twice as long as the tail fin and runs along almost the entire body. The scales on their underside are arranged randomly instead of in a distinct pattern as in many other fish. The Raitt's sand eel has a pointed jaw where the lower jaw projects further than the upper jaw.

It is difficult to distinguish this species from the other members in its genus ‘’Ammodytes’’ as they are all very similar in appearance.

== Evolution ==
The evolutionary history of the Raitt's sand eel is still debated and its exact relationship to the other members of its order Perciformes is unknown. There is currently no universally accepted phylogeny for the Raitt's sand eel's suborder the Trachinoidei.

== Distribution and habitat ==
The Raitt's sand eel is found across the Northeast Atlantic Ocean and is particularly abundant in the North Sea. They live in both the shallow open ocean and coastal waters. Four other species of sand eel are also distributed in this part of the Atlantic. The fisheries here are dominated by Raitt's sand eel suggesting the Raitt's sand eel is the most abundant in the area.

The southern boundary of the Raitt's sand eel is predicted to move further North in the future due to climate change. The Raitt's sand eel survives better in cooler waters and may move North to avoid warming sea temperatures.

Sand eels live amongst sandy sediment of the sea bed where they spend most of the year burrowed avoiding predators. They are also found living in bedrock and kelp habitats. Sandbanks are the most important habitat for the sand eel as they are used as nursery, spawning and resting grounds. Raitt's sand eels live in turbulent areas of the ocean and do not live in depths below 100m.

Raitt's sand eel have very specific habitat requirements. They are specialised to live in waters high in oxygen but with low levels of silt and clay. These requirements mean the Raitt's sand eel is found in distinct patches across the North Atlantic and instead of one continuous population.

== Population ==
Due to their lifestyle, it has been very difficult to estimate the population size of the Raitt's sand eel. Most monitoring techniques are inappropriate and cannot detect the burrowed sand eels.

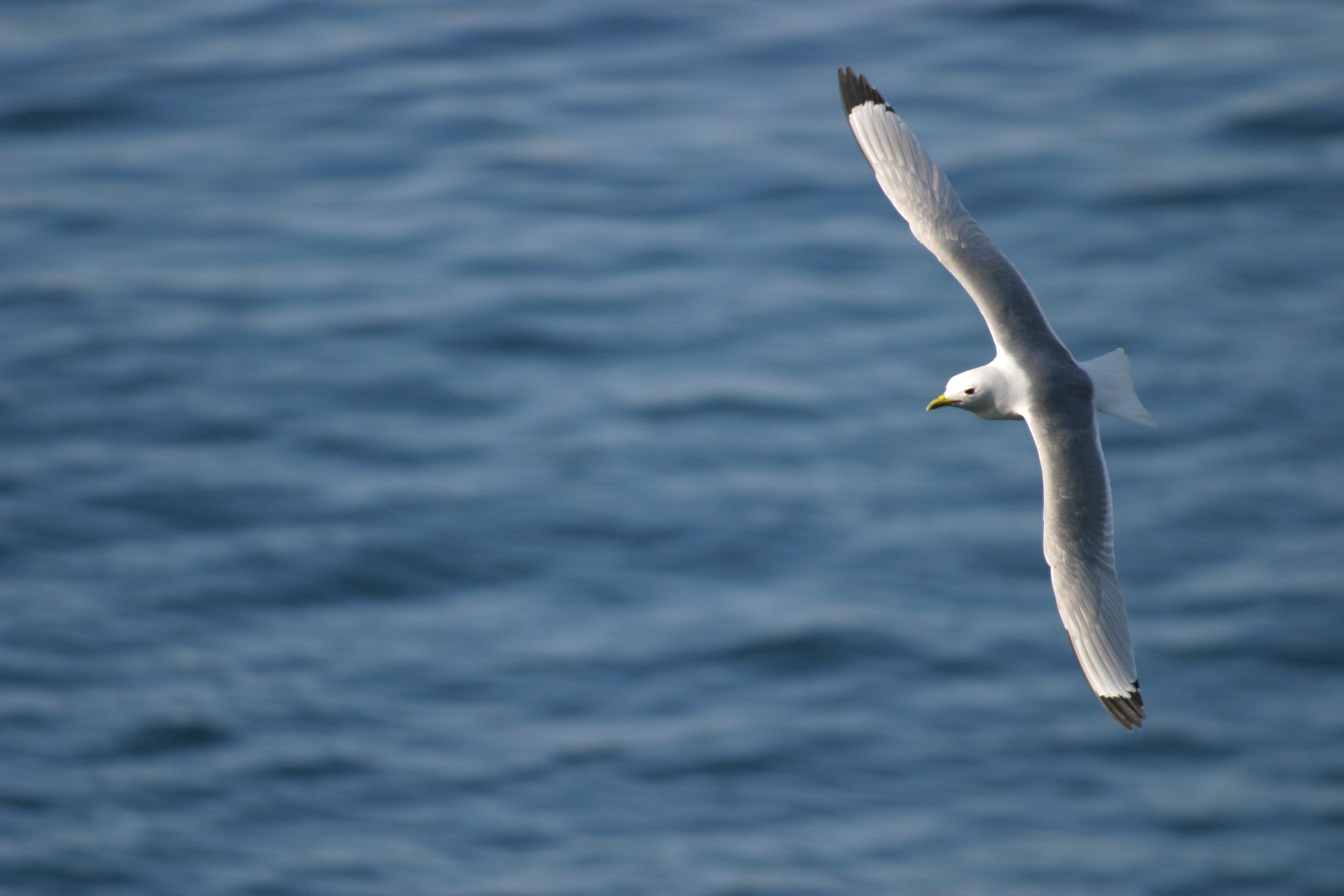
A black-legged kittiwake flying above the sea

Biological indicators, or bioindicators, are now being used to assess the size of the Raitt's sand eel population. The main indicator used for sand eels are black-legged kittiwake seabirds. These coastal breeding birds are heavily reliant on sand eels and therefore their population size changes in response to the amount of Raitt's sand eel present. This can give a lot of information about the abundance of sand eels in the area.

The Raitt's sand eel is known from fishing records to have regular population fluctuations. Overfishing, climate change and food web effects have all been shown to have contributed to these fluctuations. As the Raitt's sand eel is found in the North Atlantic Ocean its climate is altered by the North Atlantic Oscillation. This weather fluctuation can alter the recruitment of sand eel. Warmer temperatures decrease the number of sand eel juveniles that survive to adulthood and so yearly changes to temperature can cause fluctuating population size. Changes to the abundance of species connected to the Raitt's sand eel in the food web has also caused variable population size. Calanus copepods are an important prey item for sand eels. The population of Raitt's sand eel has been related to changes in the availability of this prey. Young Raitt's sand eels have lower survival when copepods are less abundant.

== Ecology ==
The Raitt's sand eel is a keystone species in the North Sea food web. They are the prey of a significant number of species including seabirds, marine mammals and larger fish. Seabirds in particular rely heavily on the Raitt's sand eel to feed their chicks. When the sand eels leave their burrows to feed seabirds dive into the water to catch them and then return to their nests. Atlantic puffin, black-legged kittiwake, common guillemot and razorbills are all known predators of this species. Common guillemots feed exclusively on Raitt's sand eel during the breeding season.

In the sea many larger fish species prey on the Raitt's sand eel including cod, haddock, whiting, saithe and mackerel. Many of these are very commercially valuable species and declines in sand eel have caused declines in their numbers due to lack of prey. Marine mammals also feed on Raitt's sand eels but less regularly. Mostly species such as grey seals, harbour seals and harbour porpoise consume many sand eels in the spring and early summer.

Raitt's sand eels feed mainly on zooplankton. By consuming zooplankton they act as a link through to the higher trophic level predators that eat sand eels.

=== Behaviour ===
Sand eel species switch between open water swimming and burying themselves in the sand to avoid nearby predators. When they are not burrowed they live in shoal formations. They spend most of the winter burrowed in the sediment but then enter the open water between March and June to feed as the abundance of prey increases. Even in the summer months when Raitt's sand eels emerge to feed they still burrow in the sand in the night.

=== Life cycle ===
Raitt's sand eels breed in December and January when they briefly leave their winter burrows in the sediment. They lay their eggs in the sand which incubate there until they hatch in February and March. The hatched sand eels live in the open water above the sediment until metamorphosis. After this, they return to burrow in the sediment. Most Raitt's sand eels live for only 3 or 4 years as they have a high level of natural death.

== Commercial uses ==
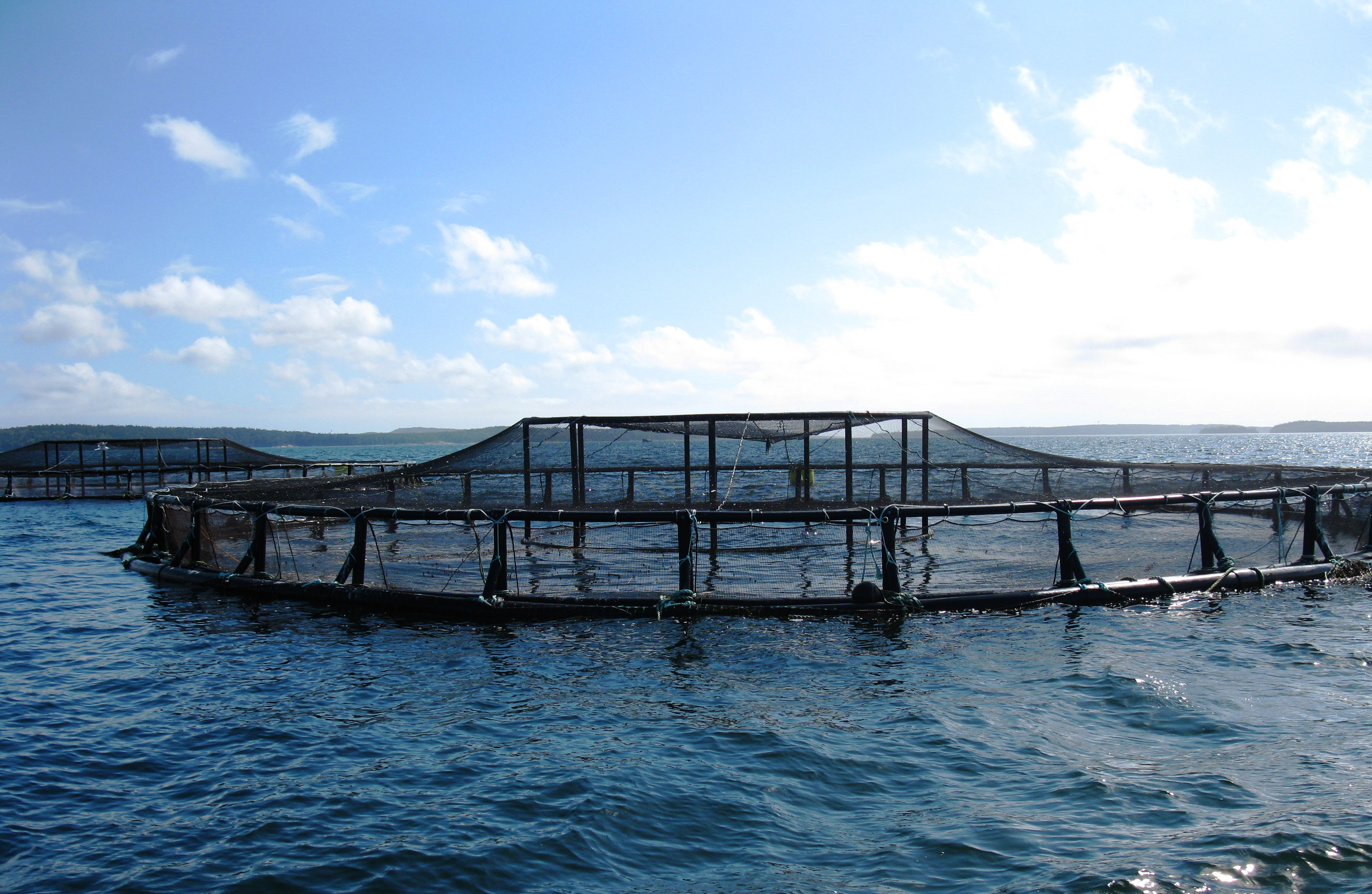
An open water aquaculture fish farm

All species of sand eels are used extensively in the fish oil and fishmeal industries. Their bodies are rich in lipids which makes them an ideal fish for these purposes. The demand for fishmeal has increased with the rise of aquaculture over the last few decades. Global production of farmed fish doubled between 1985–2000 and this created huge demands for fishmeal to feed the farmed fish. Raitt's sand eel alongside capelin and Norway pout are the primary species used for this purpose.

Sand eels have been fished since the 1950s. However, this was not done for industrial purposes until the 1970s when the fishing fleet for sand eel increased rapidly. The Raitt's sand eel is the most abundant species of sand eel in these fisheries and makes up over 90% of the catch. In 1977 the sand eel fishery became the largest fishery in the North Sea, with landings regularly exceeding 1 million tonnes. This high level of fishing caused a decline in stocks over time as the fishery became unsustainable. This led to both financial losses for the fishing industry and negative environmental consequences.

Raitt's sand eel fisheries are difficult to manage due to lack of population size data and regular population fluctuations. No catch predictions can be made for the fishery due to its instability.

=== Environmental concerns ===
Sand eel fisheries produce a lot of bycatch due to the techniques used to collect them. The netting used has a very small mesh size in order to catch the small Raitt's sand eel and larger species get caught in them. Common guillemot seabirds have repeatedly been found caught and killed in these nets and this has sparked concerns over the negative impacts of the fishery on the environment.

Fisheries of sand eel can also be harmful to seabird colonies. Fishing the Raitt's sand eel means there are less available to be eaten by the seabirds. Populations of Atlantic puffin and black-legged kittiwake have declined in response to decreased prey levels of sand eel in the sea.

=== Fishery closure ===
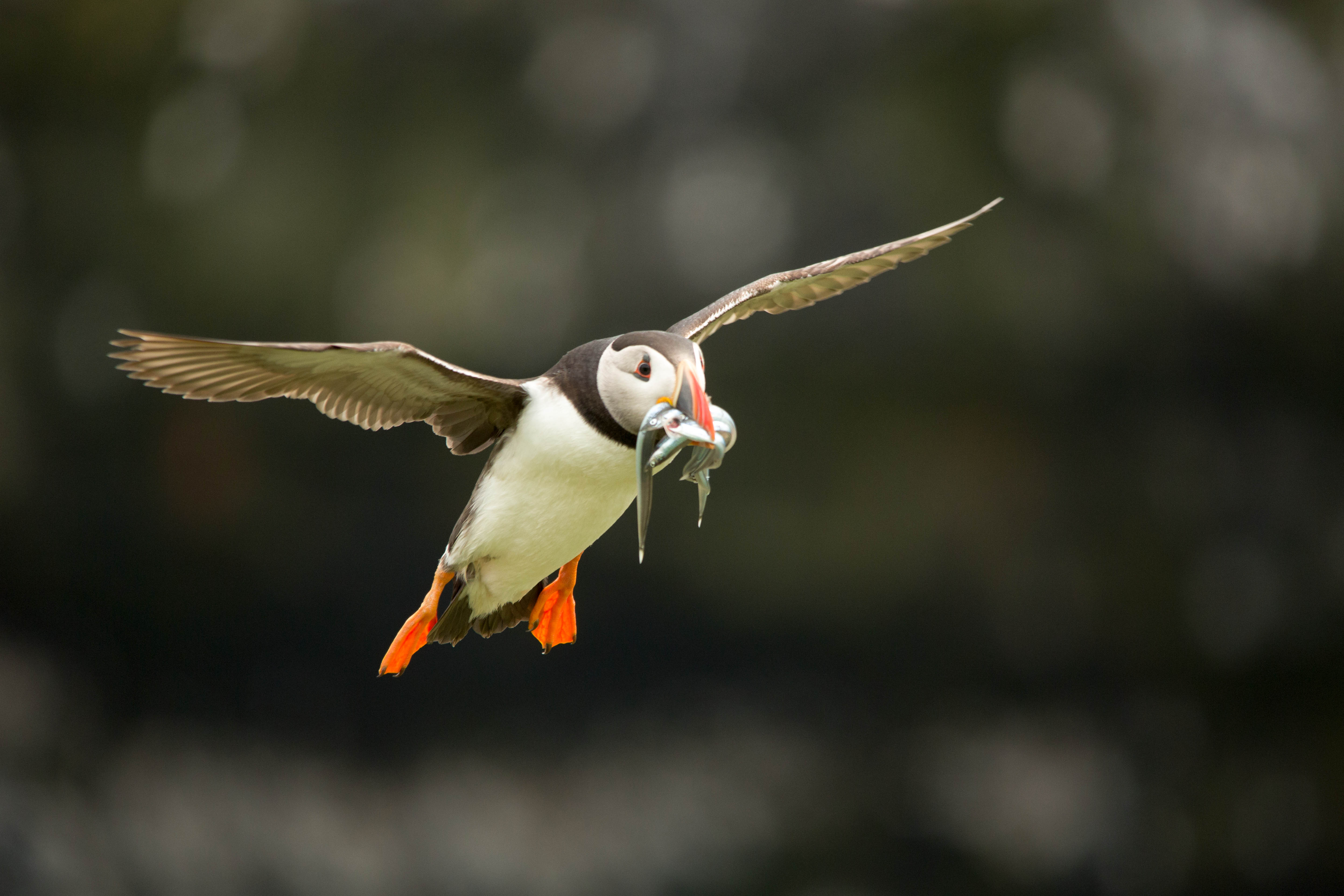
An Atlantic puffin flying with sand eel in beak

As a result of overfishing of the Raitt's sand eel the sand eel fishery in the North Sea off the coast of Scotland was closed down in 2000. An observed decline in Atlantic puffins was linked to reduced numbers of sand eel prey and the fishery was closed in the hope to recover the puffin population. After the closure the numbers of Raitt's sand eel increased and benefited many top predators including the black-legged kittiwake. The fishery continues to be closed except for a small area carefully managed to make assessments of the sand eel stock. These previous problems with Raitt's sand eel fisheries and the concerns for seabirds, commercially valuable fish and marine mammals have led to calls for better management and monitoring of sand eel abundance.

=== Controversy ===
The impacts of intense Raitt's sand eel fishing has been debated. Census data has shown that seabird populations as a whole are not negatively impacted by sand eel fisheries. Some has suggested that the observed declines in seabirds such as puffins were isolated incidences that do not represent the whole population.

== Conservation status ==
The Raitt's sand eel is currently not assessed by the IUCN Red List of Threatened Species.
