= Pacific sand lance =

Pacific sand lance is a common name for two species of fishes and may refer to:

- Ammodytes hexapterus, native to the northern Pacific and Atlantic oceans
- Ammodytes personatus, native to the northern Pacific Ocean
