= Sand eel =

Common name for several species of fish

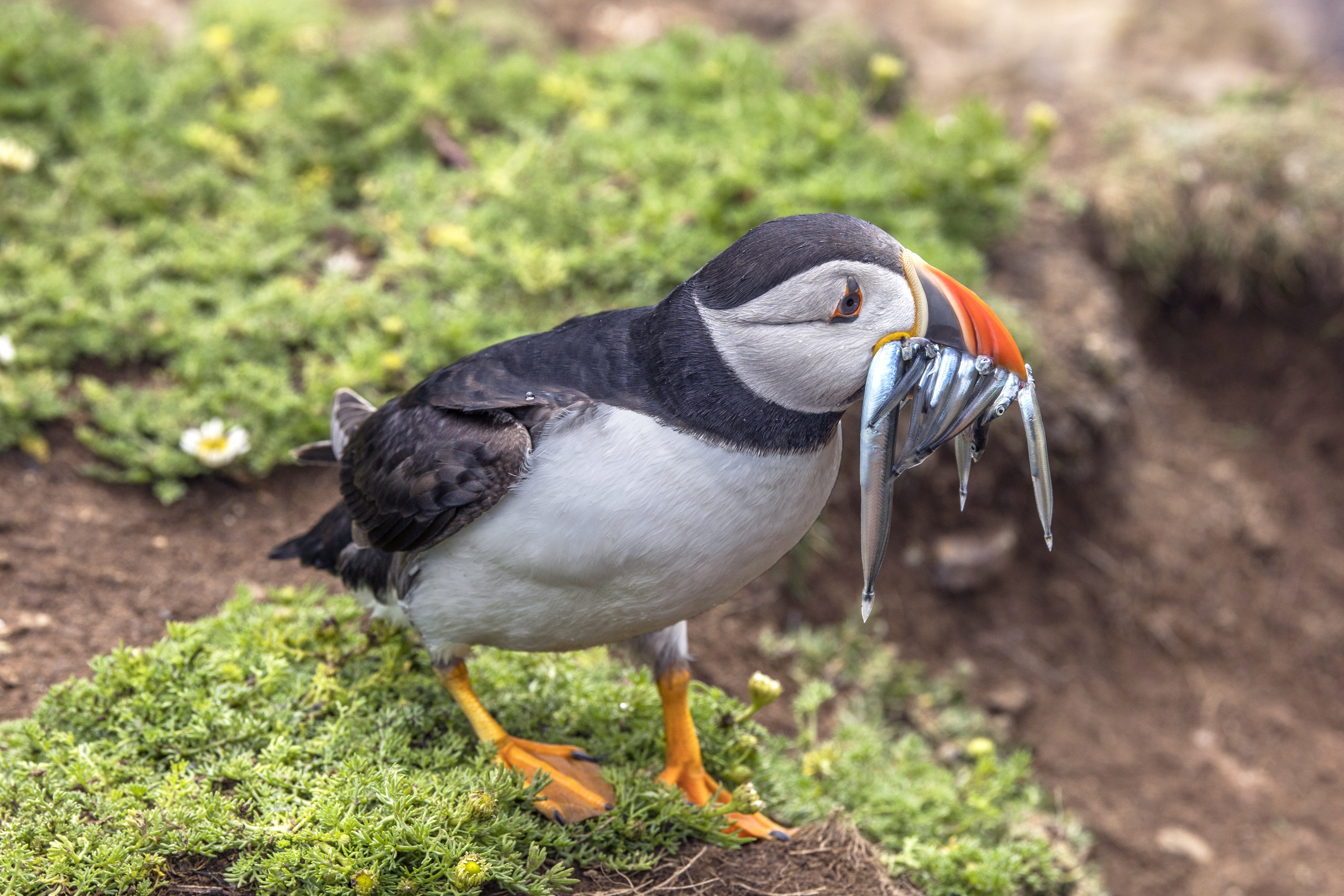
An Atlantic puffin (Fratercula arctica) with its beak full of sand eels (Ammodytes tobianus)

Sand eel or sandeel is the common name used for a considerable number of species of fish. While they are not true eels, they are eel-like in their appearance and can grow up to 30 cm (12 in) in length. Many species are found off the western coasts of Europe from Spain to Scotland, and in the Mediterranean and Baltic Seas.

Sand eels are an important food source for seabirds, including puffins and kittiwakes. They are a commercially important for the production of fish meal and made up 4% of fish globally caught for fish-meal production (behind anchovy, capelin, and blue whiting) between 1997 and 2001.

== Habitat ==
The preferential habitat for sand eels is a seabed floor, with a relatively smooth bottom of gravelly sand; an example of this prime habitat is the floor of the Sea of the Hebrides.

== Sand eel species ==
Most sand eels are sea fish of the genera Hyperoplus (greater sand eels), Gymnammodytes or Ammodytes. The three genera listed above all fall within the family Ammodytidae, the sand lances. Members of these genera found in other oceans are not usually called sand eels, and species from other parts of the world that are known as sand eels are usually less closely related.

== Commercial fishing ==
Traditionally, they have been little exploited for human food, but are a major target of industrial fishing for animal feed and fertilizer. Increasing fishing for them is thought to be causing problems for some of their natural predators, especially the auks, which take them in deeper water.

An instance of this was the RSPB report linking a population crash of seabirds in the North Sea to fishing for sand eels. This led to political pressure in the UK for the closure of this fishery; the seabird populations subsequently improved. In 2024, the closure was challenged by the European Union under the Trade and Cooperation Agreement and an arbitration tribunal for the case was established at the Permanent Court of Arbitration, based in The Hague. In May 2025, the arbitration tribunal ruled that the Scottish government's ban was lawful while the UK government's ban in relation to English waters breached the TCA on procedural grounds since it failed to have sufficient regard to the principle of proportionality. UK ministers said they would bring the decision back to compliance but they would not have to reverse the ban.

They are also used as live bait to catch fish.

== See also ==
- Environmental impact of fishing
