= Launce =

Launce can refer to:

- A character in Shakespeare's play The Two Gentlemen of Verona
- A type of fish, also known as a Sand lance
