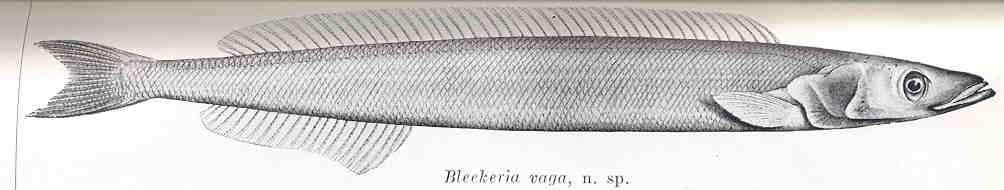
- Ammodytoides vagus

Scientific classification
- Kingdom: Animalia
- Phylum: Chordata
- Class: Actinopterygii
- Order: Labriformes
- Family: Ammodytidae
- Genus: Ammodytoides; Duncker & Mohr, 1939

Type species
- Bleekeria vaga McCulloch & Waite, 1916

= Ammodytoides =

Genus of ray-finned fishes

Ammodytoides is a genus of sand lances native to the Indian and Pacific oceans.

== Species ==
There are currently 10 recognized species in this genus:

- Ammodytoides gilli (T. H. Bean, 1895) (Gill's sand lance)
- Ammodytoides idai J. E. Randall & Earle, 2008
- Ammodytoides kanazawai Shibukawa & H. Ida, 2013
- Ammodytoides kimurai H. Ida & J. E. Randall, 1993
- Ammodytoides leptus Collette & J. E. Randall, 2000 (Pitcairn Sandlance)
- Ammodytoides praematura J. E. Randall & Earle, 2008
- Ammodytoides pylei J. E. Randall, H. Ida & Earle, 1994 (Pyle's sand lance)
- Ammodytoides renniei (J. L. B. Smith, 1957) (Scaly sandlance)
- Ammodytoides vagus (McCulloch & Waite, 1916)
- Ammodytoides xanthops J. E. Randall & Heemstra, 2008 (Yellow face sandlance)
