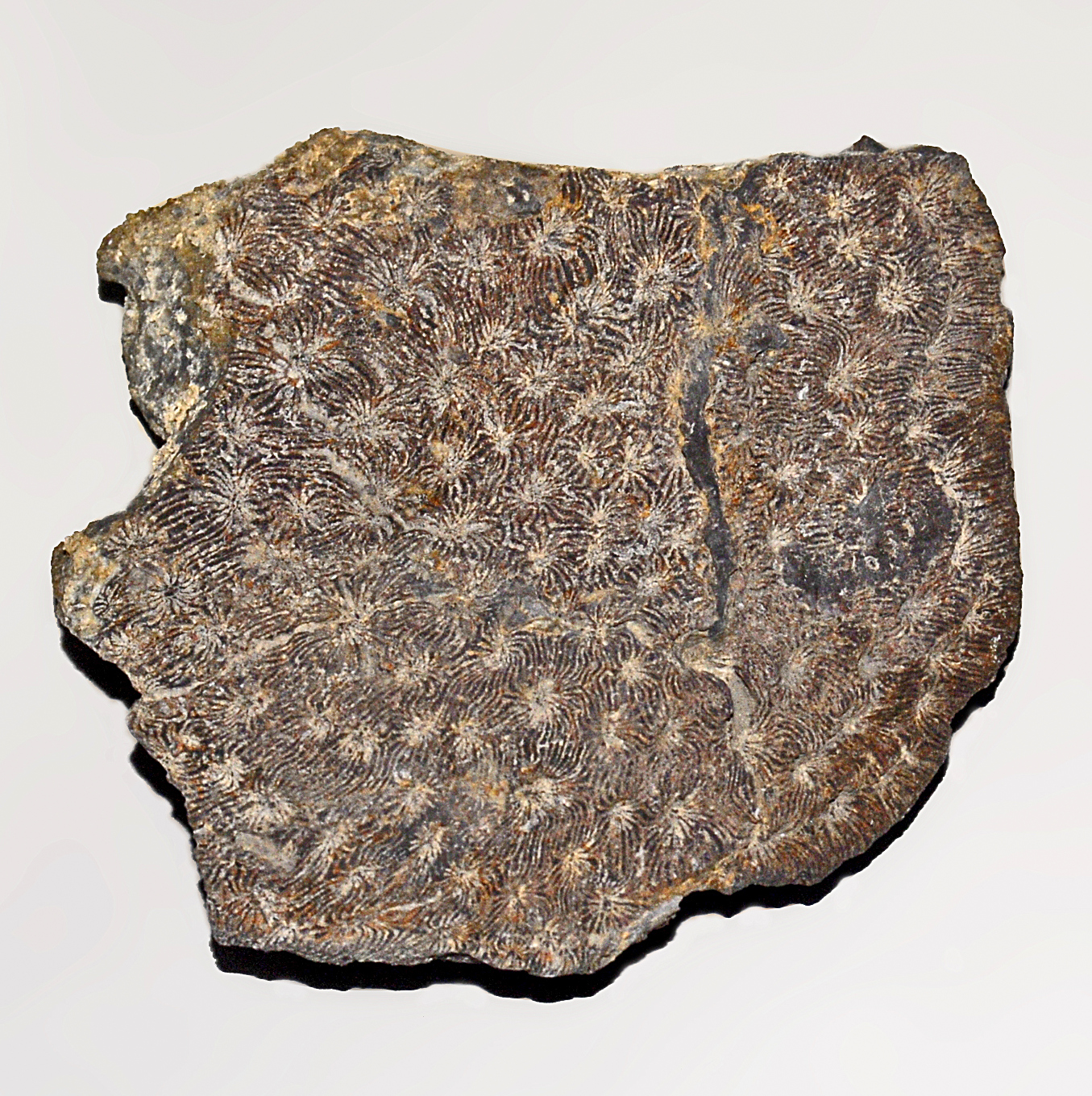
- From Rhaetian of Italy

Scientific classification
- Domain: Eukaryota
- Kingdom: Animalia
- Phylum: Cnidaria
- Subphylum: Anthozoa
- Class: Hexacorallia
- Order: Scleractinia
- Family: †Thamnasteriidae
- Genus: †Thamnasteria; LeSauvage 1823

Species
- See text

Synonyms
- †Centrastrea d'Orbigny 1849; †Dactylocoenia d'Orbigny 1849; †Thamnastraea Lesauvage 1832

= Thamnasteria =

Thamnasteria Temporal range: Triassic – Eocene 247.2–33.9 Ma

Extinct genus of corals

Thamnasteria is a genus of extinct stony corals.

== Species ==
The following species of Thamnasteria have been described:

- T. abukumaensis
- T. andranomarivensis
- T. aspera
- T. bevoayensis
- T. bonanomii
- T. communis
- T. concinna
- T. concinnaformis
- T. coquandi
- T. cotteaui
- T. defrancei
- T. dendroidea
- T. dumonti
- T. felixi
- T. globosa
- T. gracilis
- T. heterogenea
- T. hoffmeisteri
- T. huzimotoi
- T. imlayi
- T. iranensis
- T. jaccardi
- T. japonica
- T. jezoensis
- T. kobyi
- T. latistellata
- T. leptopetala
- T. lobata
- T. loryi
- T. lyelli
- T. maeandra
- T. mammosa
- T. matsushitai
- T. mettensis
- T. microconos
- T. miyakoensis
- T. moreana
- T. naumanni
- T. nicoleti
- T. ogawaensis
- T. patina
- T. pseudopaliformis
- T. racemosa
- T. rhaetica
- T. rumignyensis
- T. scita
- T. seriata
- T. settsassi
- T. sinuata
- T. sinuosa
- T. smithi
- T. tenuissima
- T. terquemi
- T. tokushimaensis
- T. tonantzinae
- T. torinosuensis
- T. yuraensis

== Fossil records ==
This genus is known in the fossil record from the Triassic to the Eocene (from about 247.2 to 33.9 million years ago). Fossils of species within this genus have been found in Europe, United States, Canada, China, Japan, Pakistan, Colombia (Coquina Group, La Guajira), India, Thailand, Indonesia, Jordan, Lebanon, Egypt, Madagascar, Russia, Ukraine, Mexico and Peru. M. LeSauvage, the author of the genus was a physician in Caen. He wrote numerous papers on medical subjects but his other interest was in palaeontology and especially the fossils of Calcaires de Caen the type locality of the genus Thamnasteria.

== See also ==
- List of prehistoric hexacorals
