= Protammodytes =

Scientific classification
- Kingdom: Animalia
- Phylum: Chordata
- Class: Actinopterygii
- Order: Labriformes
- Family: Ammodytidae
- Genus: Protammodytes; H. Ida, Sirimontaporn & Monkolprasit, 1994

Genus of ray-finned fishes

Protammodytes is a genus of sand lances found in the Atlantic and Pacific oceans.

== Species ==
There are currently 3 recognized species in this genus:

- Protammodytes brachistos H. Ida, Sirimontaporn & Monkolprasit, 1994
- Protammodytes sarisa C. R. Robins & J. E. Böhlke, 1970
- Protammodytes ventrolineatus J. E. Randall & H. Ida, 2014
