= Edme Lesauvage =

French naturalist and physician

Edme Lesauvage (also spelt Le Sauvage; 23 October 1778 – 10 December 1852) was a French naturalist and physician in Caen. He wrote numerous papers on medical subjects as well as on natural history. His main interest was in palaeontology and especially the fossils of Calcaires de Caen.

Lesauvage was born in Caen on 12 October 1778. His father Jean-Jacques Sauvage worked in the Bureau des Aides while his mother Marie-Louise-Jeanne Coquille ran a pottery and tobacco shop to add to the modest family income. Lesauvage spent his early years in a boarding school in a village near Caen where he was taken care of by an uncle. He was unhappy with school and was recalled due to his petulant behaviour and became an apprentice to a grocer at the age of fourteen or fifteen. He then moved to live in Rouen where he came to love books and reading returned and at the age of seventeen. He studied for a while under Delariviere and then under Doctor Dominel before going to Paris to study medicine. He won the first prize in Anatomy from 1806 to 1808 and obtained a doctorate in 1810. He returned to Caen and established himself as a skilled surgeon. In 1821 he was chosen to replace the medical head position occupied by Desbordeaux and vacated due to his death. The Caen Faculty of Science had to make a choice between Lesauvage and Eugène Eudes-Deslongchamps and the Deslongchamps was chosen. Lesauvage then continued his surgical practice until 1846. After the death of Dr. Dominel in 1831 he was the head of surgery, a position he held till 1846.

Lesauvage was a professor at the l'École secondaire de médecine, member of the academy, correspondent of the Royal Academy of Medicine and the Academies at Rouen and Dijon. He left 12,000 Francs to the National Academy in Caen in 1884 to establish a biennial prize in physical sciences, natural and medical history.

In 1827 Lesauvage became a member of the Société d'Agriculture and the Linnean Society. He founded a Medical Association in 1849. On 29 April 1844 he was made a member of the Legion d'Honour.

He published works on the flora and the birds of Calvados. In 1838 he published a treatise on the treatment of syphilis.

== Works ==
- Le Sauvage, E. 1823. Mémoire sur un nouveau genre de Polypier fossile. Mémoires de la Société d’Histoire Naturelle de Paris, 1(2): 241–244. (description of Thamnasteria)
- Le Sauvage, E. 1824. Note sur une espèce nouvelle de genre Ammodyte. Bulletin des Sciences, par la Société Philomathique de Paris (Sér. 3), 11: 140–141. (description of Ammodytes lanceolatus)
