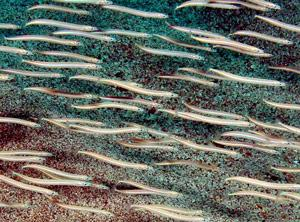
- School of Gymnammodytes cicerellus

Conservation status
- Least Concern (IUCN 3.1)

Scientific classification
- Domain: Eukaryota
- Kingdom: Animalia
- Phylum: Chordata
- Class: Actinopterygii
- Order: Labriformes
- Family: Ammodytidae
- Genus: Gymnammodytes
- Species: G. cicerelus

Binomial name
- Gymnammodytes cicerelus (Rafinesque, 1810)

Synonyms
- Ammodytes argenteus Risso, 1827; Ammodytes cicerelus Rafinesque, 1810; Ammodytes siculus Swainson, 1839; Ammodytes terebrans Cisternas, 1875; Ammodytes tobianus Risso, 1810 non Linnaeus, 1758

= Gymnammodytes cicerelus =

Species of ray-finned fish

Gymnammodytes cicerelus, also known as Mediterranean sand eel, sonso in Catalan, and barrinaire or enfú in Menorca, is a species of ray-finned fish in the family Ammodytidae, the sand lances and sand eels. It is the only species of this family in the Mediterranean Sea.

It is found over sandy or gravelly substrates in the east-central Atlantic from Portugal to Senegal, including the Canary Islands and the Cape Verde Islands, and into the Mediterranean Sea and eastwards into the Black Sea.

Its maximum size is 17 cm. It is highly appreciated as food in certain areas of Italy, as well as in Catalan cuisine where it is fried after being lightly coated in batter.

== Gallery ==
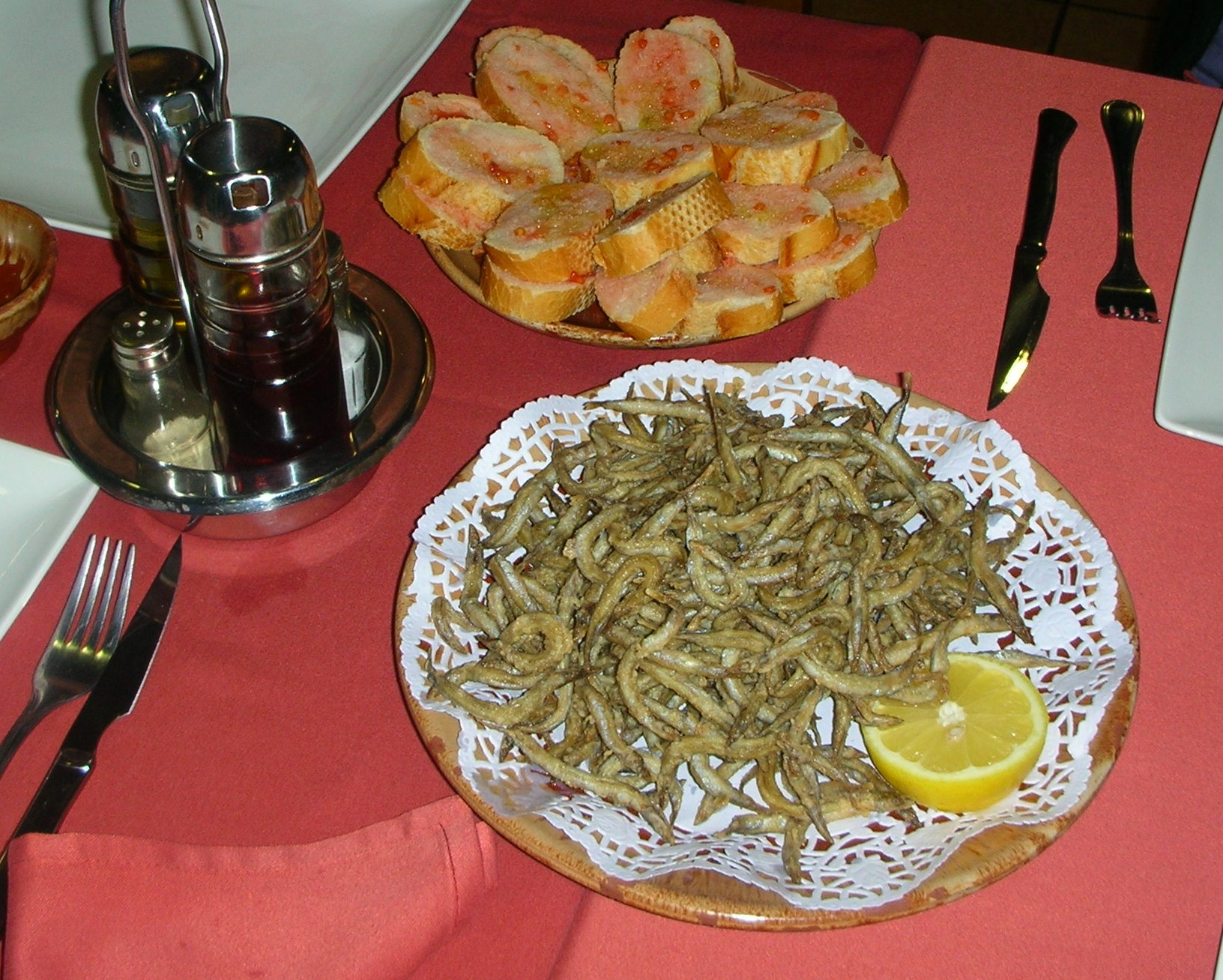
Fried sonsos with pa amb tomàquet
