= Lepidammodytes =

Scientific classification
- Kingdom: Animalia
- Phylum: Chordata
- Class: Actinopterygii
- Division: Teleostei
- Order: Labriformes
- Family: Ammodytidae
- Genus: Lepidammodytes
- Species: L. macrophthalmus

Binomial name
- Lepidammodytes macrophthalmus H. Ida, Sirimontaporn & Monkolprasit, 1994

Species of ray-finned fish

Lepidammodytes macrophthalmus is a species of sand lance endemic to the Pacific Ocean waters around Hawaii. A deep-water fish, it is found at around 200 metres (660 ft). This species grows to a length of 15.9 centimetres (6.3 in) SL. This species is the only known member of its genus. According to the U.S. Forest Service, it "is characterized by having strongly ctenoid scales, larger eyes, perforated lacrymals, and a moderate number of vertebrae".
