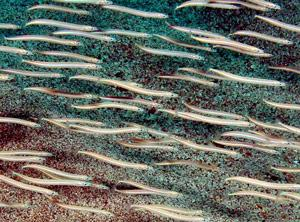
- Mediterranean sand eel (G. cicerelus)

Scientific classification
- Kingdom: Animalia
- Phylum: Chordata
- Class: Actinopterygii
- Order: Labriformes
- Family: Ammodytidae
- Genus: Gymnammodytes; Duncker & Mohr, 1935

= Gymnammodytes =

Gymnammodytes Temporal range: Late Miocene to present

Genus of ray-finned fishes

Gymnammodytes is a genus of sand lances native to the eastern Atlantic Ocean, the Mediterranean Sea and the southwestern Indian Ocean along the coast of Africa.

== Species ==
The currently recognized species in this genus are:

- Gymnammodytes capensis (Barnard, 1927) (Cape sand lance)
- Gymnammodytes cicerelus (Rafinesque, 1810) (Mediterranean sand eel)
- Gymnammodytes semisquamatus (S. Jourdain, 1879) (smooth sand eel)

The only known fossil member of this genus is Gymnammodytes oranensis Carnevale, 2004 from the latest Miocene (Messinian) of Algeria.
