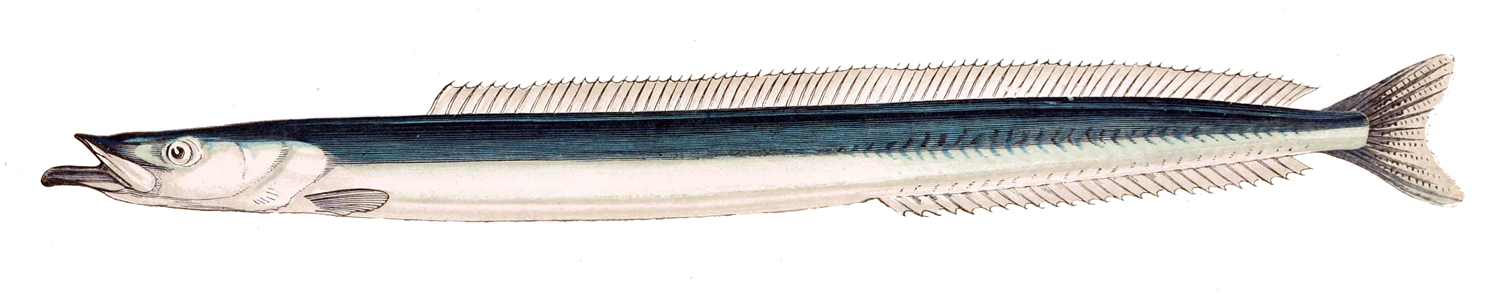
- Great sand eel (H. lanceolatus)

Scientific classification
- Domain: Eukaryota
- Kingdom: Animalia
- Phylum: Chordata
- Class: Actinopterygii
- Order: Labriformes
- Family: Ammodytidae
- Genus: Hyperoplus; Günther, 1862

= Hyperoplus =

Genus of ray-finned fishes

Hyperoplus is a genus of sand eels native to the northeastern Atlantic Ocean.

== Species ==
The currently recognized species in this genus are:

- Hyperoplus immaculatus (Corbin, 1950) (Corbin's sand eel)
- Hyperoplus lanceolatus (Le Sauvage, 1824) (great sand eel)
