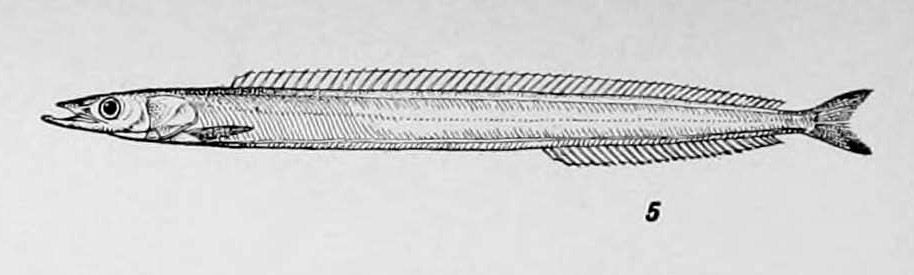
- Ammodytes americanus
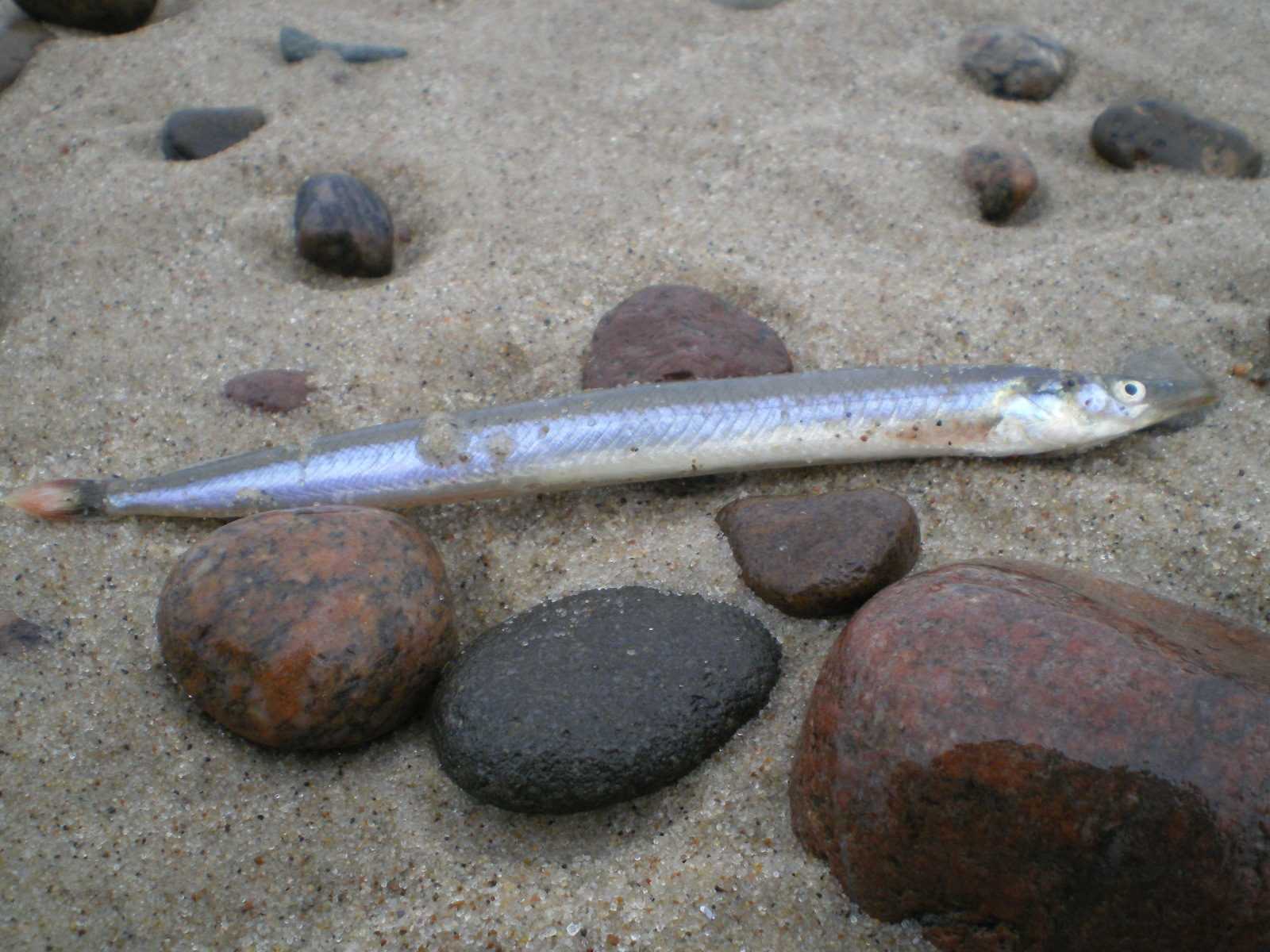
- Ammodytes tobianus

Scientific classification
- Kingdom: Animalia
- Phylum: Chordata
- Class: Actinopterygii
- Division: Teleostei
- Order: Labriformes
- Family: Ammodytidae
- Genus: Ammodytes; Linnaeus, 1758

= Ammodytes =

Genus of ray-finned fishes

Ammodytes is a genus of sand lances native to the northern oceans.

== Species ==
There are currently 8 recognized species in this genus:

- Ammodytes americanus DeKay, 1842 (American sand lance)
- Ammodytes dubius J. C. H. Reinhardt, 1837 (Northern sand lance)
- Ammodytes heian J. W. Orr, Wildes & Kai, 2015 (Peaceful sand lance)
- Ammodytes hexapterus Pallas, 1814 (Pacific sand lance)
- Ammodytes japonicus Duncker & Mohr (de), 1939 (Western sand lance)
- Ammodytes marinus Raitt, 1934 (Raitt's sand eel)
- Ammodytes personatus Girard, 1856 (Arctic sand lance)
- Ammodytes tobianus Linnaeus, 1758 (Lesser sand eel)
