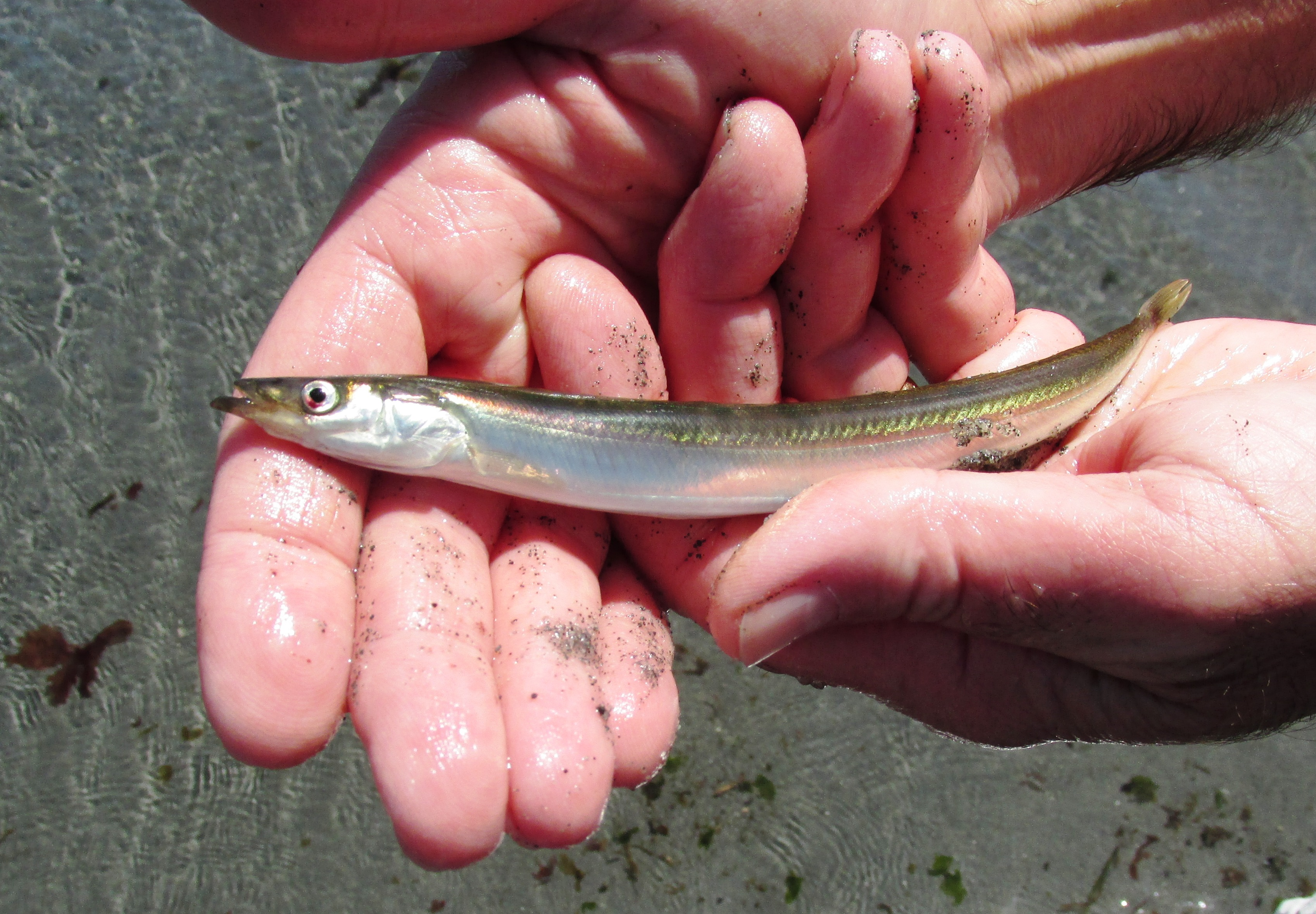

Scientific classification
- Kingdom: Animalia
- Phylum: Chordata
- Class: Actinopterygii
- Division: Teleostei
- Order: Labriformes
- Family: Ammodytidae
- Genus: Ammodytes
- Species: A. hexapterus

Binomial name
- Ammodytes hexapterus Pallas, 1814

= Ammodytes hexapterus =

Species of fish

Ammodytes hexapterus, the Pacific sand lance, is a small, planktivorous, saltwater fish found across the North Pacific. This tiny fish is a member of the Ammodytidae family, or sand lances. The name hails from Greek, with ammos meaning "sand" and dytes meaning "liking to immerse in". Like many other sand lances, the Pacific sand lance a benthic fish that immerses itself in the sand.

== Description ==
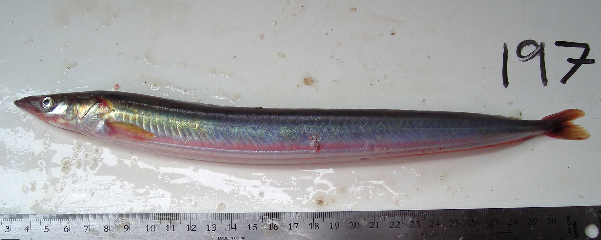
Ammodytes hexapterus

While adult Pacific sand lance usually grow to around 17 cm, some individuals have been caught and measured to be as large as 30 cm. These fish usually weigh up to 100 g. This species features an anguilliform body ending at a very pointed snout, which it uses to assist in burrowing into the sediments it inhabits. These body features are accompanied by appendages including an elongated long dorsal fin that lacks spines, forked caudal fin, an elongated anal fin, and two pectoral fins, the pelvic fins are absent. The dorsal fin has between 58 and 63 dorsal fin rays and the anal fin has between 28 and 31 anal fin rays. This is important for being able to distinguish these fish from other fish within the Ammodytidae family, as all of these fishes look very similar. Most notably, A. personatus is nearly identical to A. hexapterus, only differentiated by their dorsal and anal fin ray counts. Like most Ammodytidae, the Pacific sand lance possesses a protrusible mouth, with its upper jaw in particular being very mobile, though their lower jaw projects beyond their upper jaw. This mouth is moderately sized, extending from just above the anterior, or frontal, tip of the fish back too, but not aligning with the eye. The Pacific sand lance possesses large eyes and thin, paddle-shaped fins that the it uses for directional orientation and small quick movements. It has small cycloid scales and an elevated lateral line on the fish's back. Its back is a metallic black color, which is separated from the white underbelly by a central coloring along its sides that varies from a metallic blue, green, and/or silver.

== Distribution ==
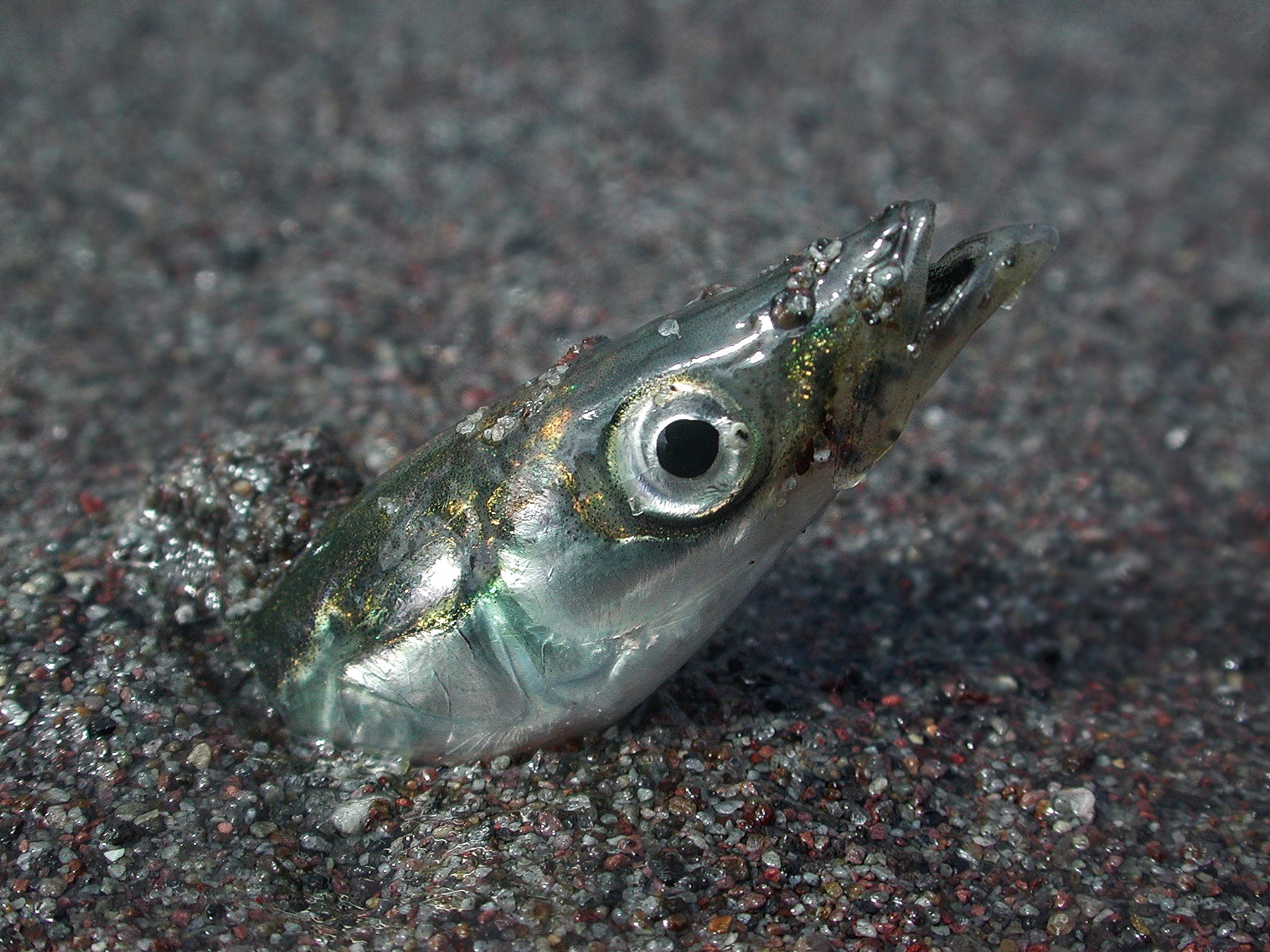
Ammodytes hexapterus burrowing into the sand

The Pacific sand lance can be found in a vast swath of water from the North American Arctic to the Sea of Okhotsk, occurring in the Hudson Bay, Beaufort Sea, Chukchi Sea, and Bering Sea. They have also been observed in Soya Strait, Japan, and in Southern California. Within this geographical distribution, they can be found in both nearshore and offshore areas with said distribution in such areas being mainly influenced by what life history stage they are in. It has been noted that while they can tolerate a variety of sediments from gravel to silt, they show a noticeable preference for coarse sand with a grain size around 0.5 to 1.0 mm. While their benthic tendencies are observed in both the nearshore and offshore areas, they can also be found at the surface. It is not at all too uncommon to see large schools of these fish at the surface of the water column from the intertidal to subtidal zones, as well as in deep waters far offshore. While the Pacific sand lance is most commonly found at depths of 30 - 100 meters, it can be found as shallow as 0 meters and as deep as 275 meters.

== Life history ==
Despite the oldest individuals living to around 11 years, the Pacific sand lance is considered a short-lived species, with individuals being considered exceptionally long-lived if they make it to 6 years. Spawning takes place once a year, with adults venturing into the intertidal zones of beaches featuring fine gravel or coarse sand. While the spawning time period may depend partially on regional factors, this is not entirely the case. It has been noted that A. hexapterus spawning events recorded across different locations show a general overlap between November and April, with a general overlap in late winter. The spawning grounds they choose are often the same ones they hatched in, meaning that these fish show high site fidelity. They lay demersal eggs, eggs that are laid on the bottom or sink to the bottom of the water column. These eggs will attach to the beach or intertidal substrate, whereupon they will remain during the month-long incubation period. Once that period concludes, the larvae will emerge at around 5 mm, after which they will go through several ontogenetic stages, completing their transformation and reaching 50 mm in length around 5 months after emergence. During this period of growth, juvenile A. hexapterus will remain in the nearshore area, feeding on zooplankton. After this the juveniles will descend to the bottom and settle in the sandy sediment. Over the next couple of months they will more than double in size, experiencing 88% of their annual growth during this time. Adults will also grow over this same period, though not nearly to the same extent as juveniles. Physical growth slows after this period but developmental growth continues. Pacific sand lances generally reach sexual maturity in their second year, with males maturing earlier in the season than females. Upon reaching the adult stage, new adults are able to participate in the annual spawning. Newly matured adult Pacific sand lances change their habitat by moving from the juvenile-dominated nearshore habitat to the adult-dominated offshore habitat. This is very consistent with the completion of maturity, indicating that it is an ontogenetic niche shift, meaning that the change is prompted by development. In this case, the change is being prompted by the development of sexual maturity and reaching adulthood.

== Ecology ==
The Pacific sand lance occupies nearshore and offshore pelagic ecosystems, being found from the surface to the sediment. Both juveniles and adults of the Pacific sand lance species forage on zooplankton, differentiated only by where they forage. This fish is an essential component of these ecosystems that we see in the Arctic and northern Pacific areas. The Pacific sand lance serves not only as prey for birds and mammals, but also provides a robust food source for North Pacific commercial fisheries. The Pacific sand lance is a prey species for 12 species of marine mammals, 45 species of fish, and 40 species of birds. The gray whale, inhabits much of the same habitat as the Pacific sand lance and employs a benthic feeding strategy, and will feed on Pacific sand lance. Other notable predators include the Steller sea lion and rockfish of the Sebastes genus.

== Conservation status ==
The Pacific sand lance has not been evaluated by the IUCN, nor are they listed as endangered or threatened on a federal or state level in the United States. However, Alaska did place a ban on the fishing of the Pacific sand lance in 1999, which remains in place as of 2025. In placing this ban they cited concerns about the Pacific sand lance's integral role in the marine ecosystem, referring to its status as a prey item of many important fisheries fish. The species is also listed as a Priority Species by the Washington Department of Fish & Wildlife. The Pacific sand lance's high site fidelity to nearshore habitats poses a major problem if said habitats are ravaged by anthropogenic factors, such as coastal development and beach pollution. Being an important prey species for many commercial fish, this species gets more attention than other similar species that have yet to be evaluated. Long-term monitoring of the population dynamics of this species is viewed as a necessity. However, traditional conservation and management of this species has been viewed through the lens of its predators with an emphasis being placed on how reduced A. hexapterus would negatively impact predator species, and thus negatively impact major fisheries in the North Pacific.
