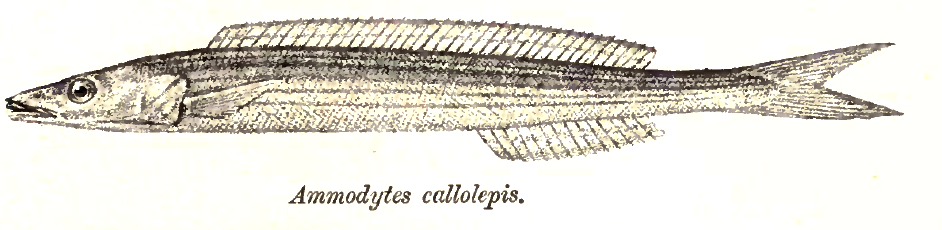
- Bleekeria kallolepis

Scientific classification
- Domain: Eukaryota
- Kingdom: Animalia
- Phylum: Chordata
- Class: Actinopterygii
- Order: Labriformes
- Family: Ammodytidae
- Genus: Bleekeria; Günther, 1862

= Bleekeria (fish) =

Genus of ray-finned fishes

Bleekeria is a genus of sand lances native to the Indian Ocean and the western Pacific Ocean.

== Species ==
There are currently 6 recognized species in this genus:

- Bleekeria estuaria J. E. Randall & H. Ida, 2014
- Bleekeria kallolepis Günther, 1862
- Bleekeria mitsukurii D. S. Jordan & Evermann, 1902
- Bleekeria murtii K. K. Joshi, Zacharia & P. Kanthan, 2012
- Bleekeria profunda J. E. Randall & H. Ida, 2014
- Bleekeria viridianguilla Fowler, 1931
