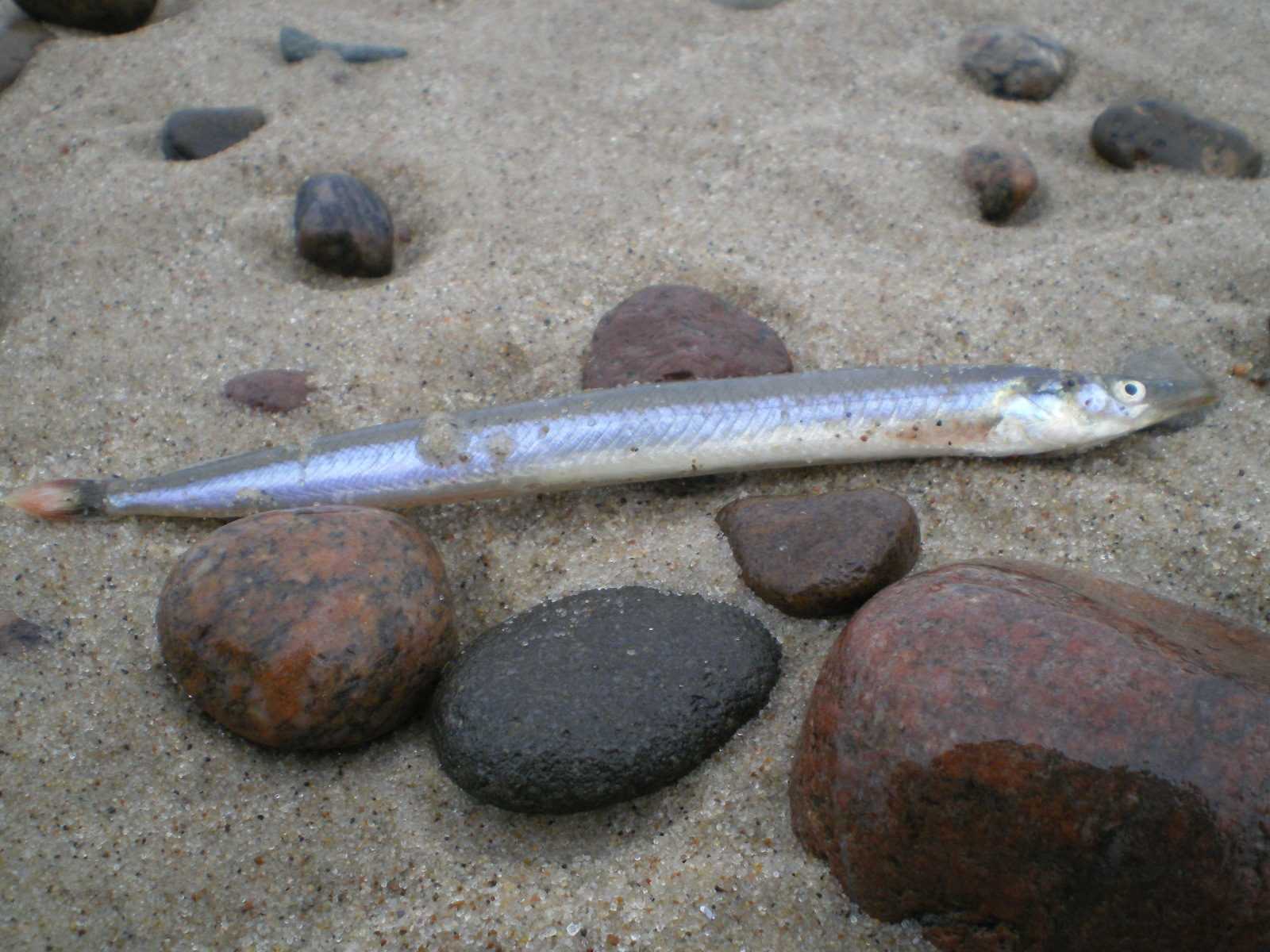

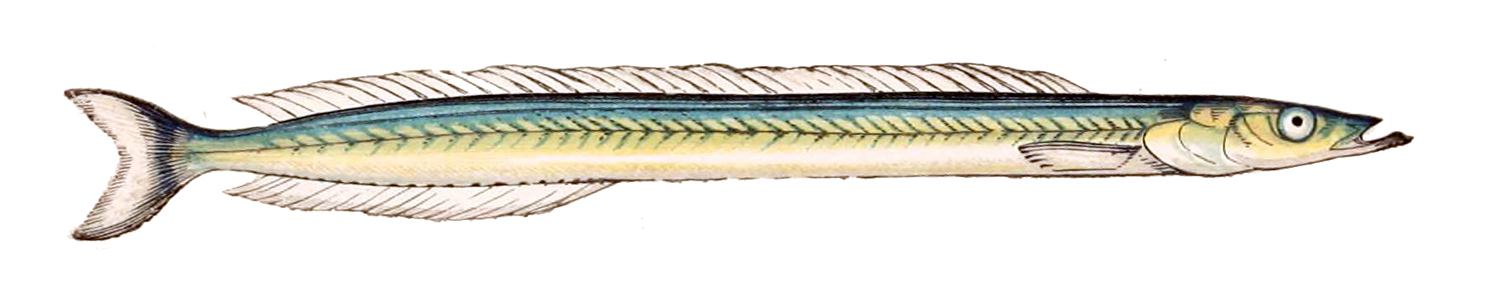

Conservation status
- Data Deficient (IUCN 3.1)

Scientific classification
- Kingdom: Animalia
- Phylum: Chordata
- Class: Actinopterygii
- Division: Teleostei
- Order: Labriformes
- Family: Ammodytidae
- Genus: Ammodytes
- Species: A. tobianus

Binomial name
- Ammodytes tobianus Linnaeus, 1758

= Lesser sand eel =

Species of fish

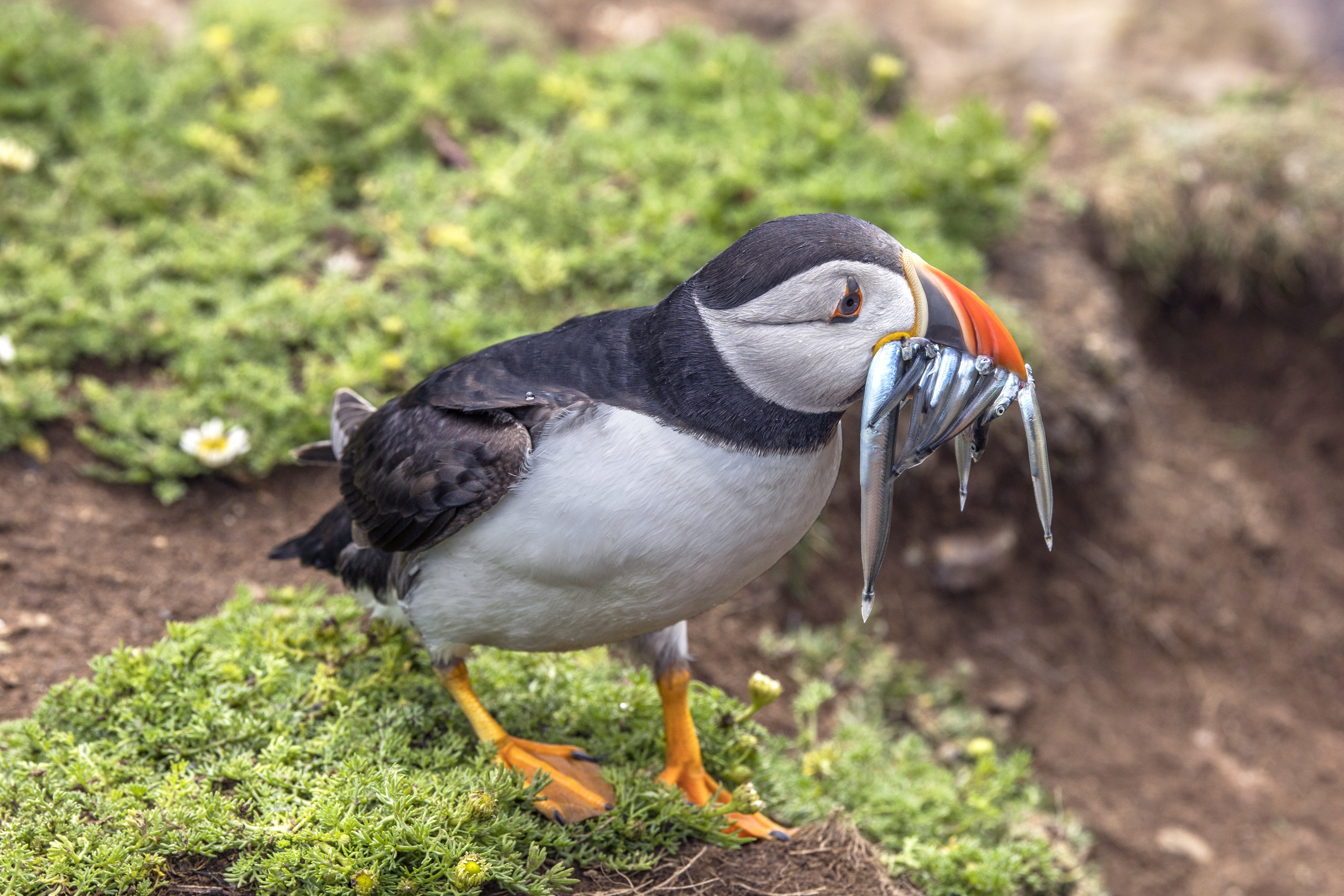
An Atlantic puffin (Fratercula arctica) with its beak full of lesser sand eels

The lesser or small sand eel (Ammodytes tobianus) is a species of fish in the sand lance family Ammodytidae. It is an elongated cylindrical fish which may be up to 20 centimetres (7.9 in) long.

== Description ==
The body of the lesser sand eel has an elongated shape with a rounded cross section. The head is also elongated and pointed, and the sharp prominent lower jaw projects further than the upper jaw. When the mouth is opened, the two jaws form a tube through which food is sucked in. The top of the fish's mouth lacks teeth. The scales of the belly make a chevron pattern. The dorsal fin is long and ribbon-like, the pectoral fins are small and low set, and there are no pelvic fins. The caudal fin is bifurcated in shape. The skin color is greenish yellow on the back, yellowish on the upper sides, and a mixture of a brilliant silver on the lower sides and belly. This fish can be distinguished from the greater sand eel by its smaller size (less than 20 cm (8 in)) and the fact that the origin of the long dorsal fin starts approximately in line with the tip of the pectoral fin.

== Behavior ==
Breeding can vary to which race they are native, and usually happens from February to April, or from September through into November. Adult forms become mature in 1 to 2 years (8 cm+), and will live 7 years or more. It habitates from mid-tide level below to around 30m in inshore waters, that have clean and sandy bottoms. It is commonly found swimming in huge shoals and rapidly burrows in sand if alarmed. It is nocturnal, spending the day buried in the sand and emerging at dusk to feed.

It eats zooplankton, larvae of fish, crustaceans, and other smaller invertebrates. In addition, it is found all throughout the coasts of the British Isles. Sand eels are an important part of the diet of many seabirds. Excessive fishing of sand eels on an industrial scale in the North Sea has been linked to a decline in the breeding success of kittiwakes, terns, fulmars and shags.

== Bibliography ==
- "The 2004 breeding season will go down as the worst in living memory for Fair Isle’s seabirds (Table 2). Numbers of birds attempting to breed were at their lowest levels for many species (Table 1) and very few chicks were seen. Common Guillemot, Razorbill, Black-legged Kittiwake, Arctic Skua, Arctic Tern and Common Tern all failed to fledge any young whilst just a single Great Skua fledged from a pitiful 96 AOT (Apparently Occupied Territories). As in most years of poor productivity, it is a lack of Lesser Sandeel (the staple diet of nearly all seabirds in Shetland) that is at the root of the problem."
- Svenning, M.-A., Borgstrøm, R., Dehli, T.O., Moen, G., Pedersen, T., Barrett, R.T. & Vader, W. 2005. Large numbers of lesser sandeel (Ammodytes marinus) available as prey for marine fishes enhance the survival of Atlantic salmon smolts (Salmo salar) as they leave the Tana river, North Norway. - Fisheries Research 76: 466–474.
- Fishmeal Production
