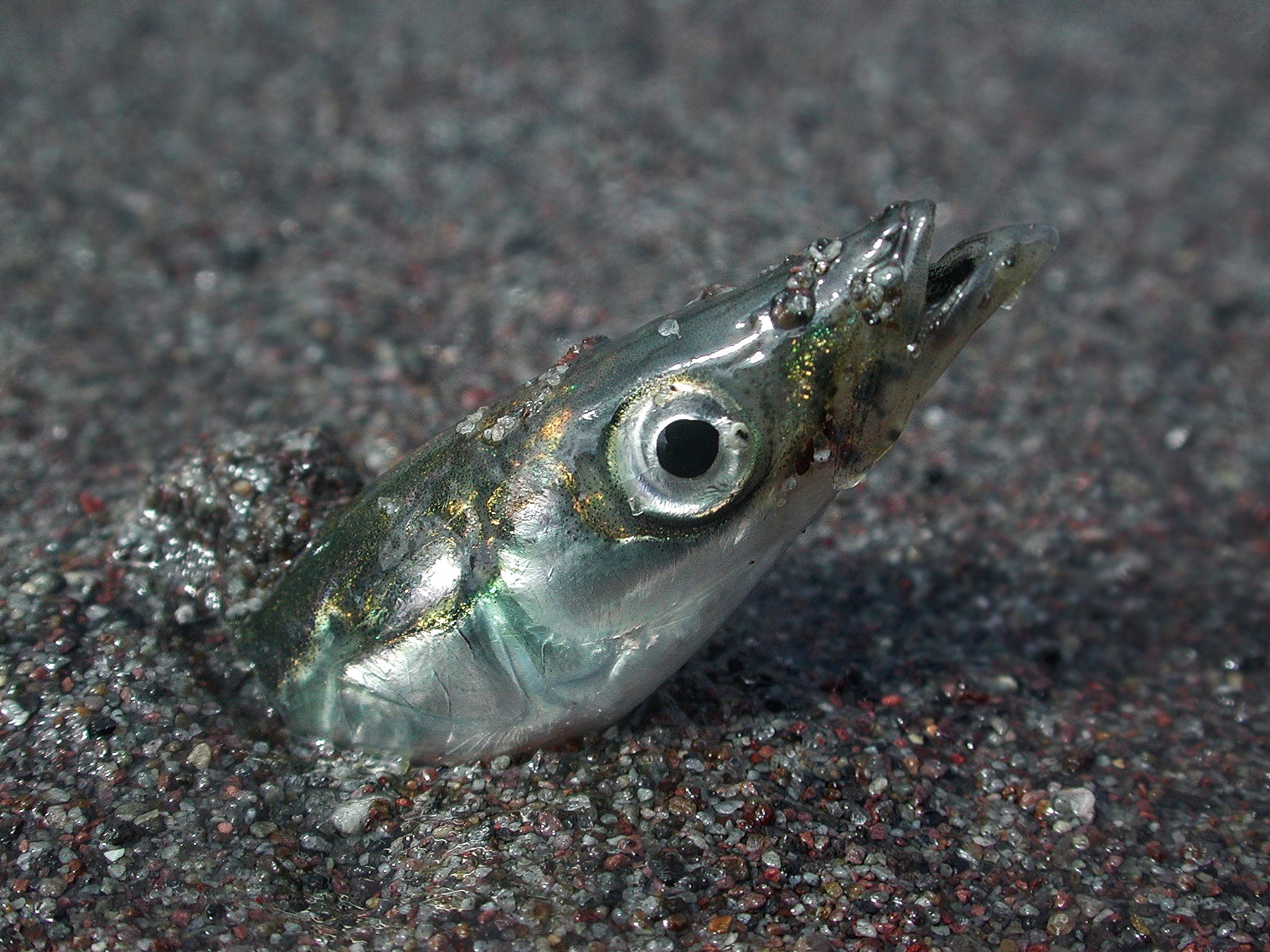
- Ammodytes hexapterus

Scientific classification
- Kingdom: Animalia
- Phylum: Chordata
- Class: Actinopterygii
- Division: Teleostei
- Order: Labriformes
- Suborder: Uranoscopoidei
- Family: Ammodytidae; Bonaparte, 1832

Genera
- Ammodytes; Ammodytoides; Bleekeria; Gymnammodytes; Hyperoplus; Lepidammodytes; Protammodytes

= Sand lance =

Sand lances

Family of ray-finned fishes

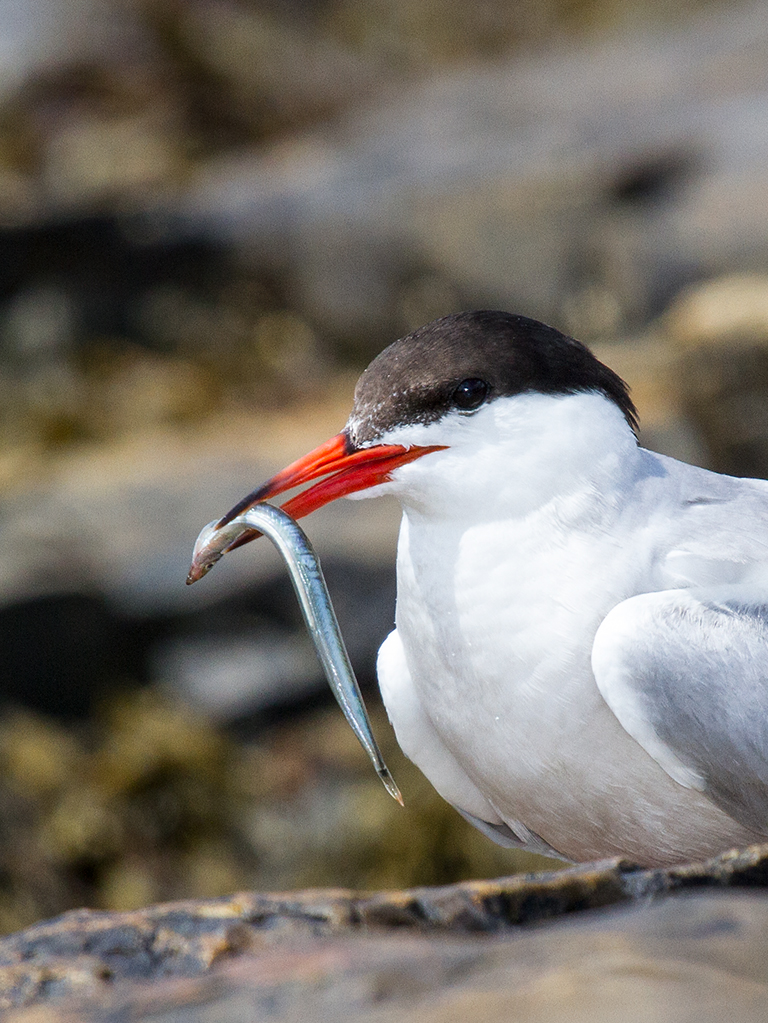
A common tern with a sand lance, Biddeford Pool, ME - August 2013

A sand lance or sandlance is a ray-finned fish belonging to the family Ammodytidae. Several species of sand lances are commonly known as "sand eels", though they are not related to true eels. Another variant name is launce, and all names of the fish are references to its slender body and pointed snout. The family name (and genus name, Ammodytes) means "sand burrower", which describes the sand lance's habit of burrowing into sand to avoid tidal currents.

Sand lances are most commonly encountered by fishermen in the North Pacific and North Atlantic, but are found in oceans throughout the world. These fish do not have pelvic fins and do not develop swim bladders, staying true to their bottom-dwelling habit as adults. Both adult and larval sea lances primarily feed on copepods. Larval forms of this fish are perhaps the most abundant of all fish larvae in areas such as the northwest Atlantic, serving as a major food item for cod, salmon, whales, and other commercially important species. As adults, sand lances are harvested commercially in some areas (primarily in Europe), leading to direct human competition with diving birds such as puffins, auks, terns, and cormorants. Some species are inshore coastal dwellers, and digging for sand lances to use as a bait fish has been a popular pasttime in coastal areas of Europe and North America. Other species are deep-water dwellers, some of which have only recently been described to science, and most of which lack common names.

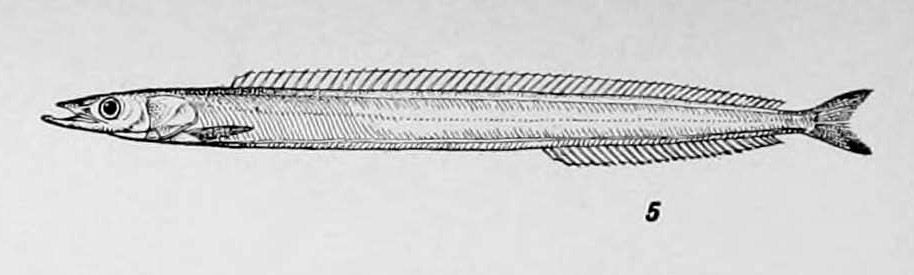
Ammodytes americanus

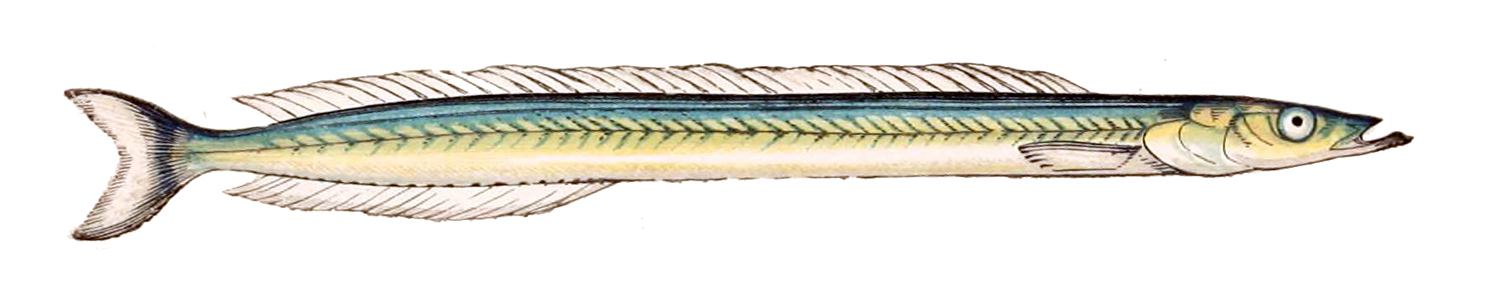
Ammodytes tobianus

Ammodytes dubius

== Convergent evolution ==
Sand lances have chameleon-like, independent eye movements and special focusing lenses. These specialized eyes enhance the animals' prey capture ability as shown by their high success rates. Superficially, the swift strike of the sand lance resembles the "ballistic tongue" of chameleons. Sand lances and chameleons share other features.

== See also ==
The sand lance has lent its name to two submarines of the United States Navy:

- USS Sand Lance (SS-381), a Balao-class submarine.
- USS Sand Lance (SSN-660), a Sturgeon-class nuclear submarine.
