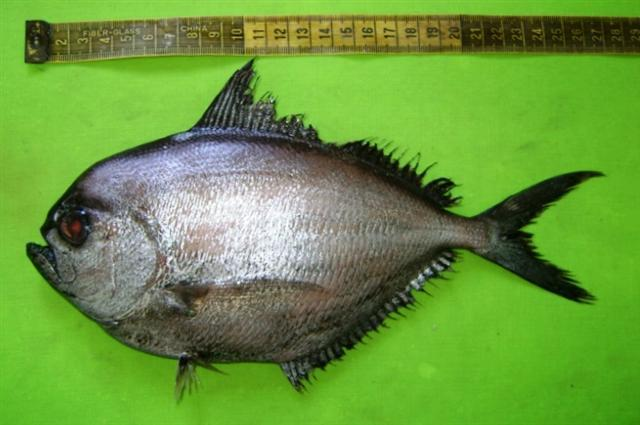

Conservation status
- Least Concern (IUCN 3.1)

Scientific classification
- Kingdom: Animalia
- Phylum: Chordata
- Class: Actinopterygii
- Order: Scombriformes
- Family: Bramidae
- Genus: Brama
- Species: B. dussumieri

Binomial name
- Brama dussumieri (Cuvier, 1831)

Synonyms
- Tylometopon dussumieri (Cuvier, 1831); Brama agassizi Poey, 1860; Brama leucotaenia Fowler, 1938

= Brama dussumieri =

Lesser bream

Species of fish

Brama dussumieri, the lesser bream or lowfin pomfret, is a species of marine ray-finned fish, a pomfret of the family Bramidae. It is found in warm seas around the world.

The specific name honours the French explorer and trader Jean-Jacques Dussumier (1792-1883).

== Description ==
Brama dussumieri can be distinguished from congeners through the following characteristics:

- Possessing pectoral fins that are placed low on the body in both juvenile 'and' adult stages (overlap with Brama caribbea, Brama myseri, and Brama orcini).
- Having relatively long ventral fins
- Having a total number of vertebrae equaling 40 or more (overlaps with Brama myersi)
- Possessing a total number of anal fin rays equaling 28 or fewer

== Ecology ==
Brama dussumieri like many bramids serves as an important forage fish for large, pelagic, predatory fishes. B. dussumieri have been successfully collected from the stomachs of bigeye and yellowfin tuna and striped marlin, suggesting that they serve a similar role for fast swimming, open ocean predators.

== Distribution ==
Brama dussumieri can be found throughout the high seas of all tropical oceans (e.g. Atlantic, Pacific, Indo-Pacific) and associated seas, such as the Yellow and Sea of Japan off the coast of Korea.

== Reproduction ==
Brama dussumieri specimens have been collected at various life stages, including larval and juvenile, globally, suggesting that there is no specific localized spawning area. Juveniles have been collected throughout the Gulf of Mexico, Caribbean, eastern Atlantic, Gulf Stream of Chesapeake Bay, and the Indo-Pacific at various times through the year. In some locations (i.e., the Indo-Pacific), young can be collected nearly every month of the year.

Females are thought to reach sexual maturity by 170mm standard length. Egg diameter ranges from 0.3mm - 1.6mm, depending on the gonadosomatic index (GSI), with larger eggs being present in females with a high GSI.

== Genome ==
Brama dussumieri had its complete mitochondrial genome sequenced in 2018 and found to be a characteristic the typical Brama mitochondrial genome. The genome contains 26.21% adenine, 25.65% thymine, 16.83% guanine, and 31.31% cytosine, appearing nearly identical to that of Brama japonica, a congener.
