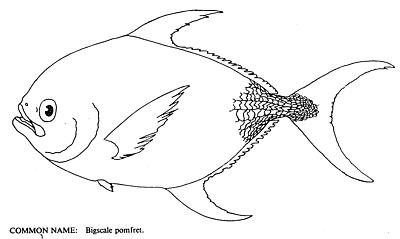

Conservation status
- Least Concern (IUCN 3.1)

Scientific classification
- Kingdom: Animalia
- Phylum: Chordata
- Class: Actinopterygii
- Order: Scombriformes
- Family: Bramidae
- Genus: Taractichthys
- Species: T. longipinnis

Binomial name
- Taractichthys longipinnis (R. T. Lowe, 1843)

Synonyms
- Brama longipinnis Lowe, 1843; Taractes longipinnis (Lowe, 1843); Brama princeps Johnson, 1863; Lepidotus princeps (Johnson, 1863); Taractes princeps (Johnson, 1863)

= Big-scale pomfret =

Species of ray-finned fish

The big-scale pomfret (Taractichthys longipinnis) also known as the long-finned bream, is a species of marine ray-finned fish, a pomfret of the family Bramidae. It is found in the Atlantic ocean, at depths down to 500 metres (1,600 ft). This species is widely distributed in the Pacific, from temperate zones throughout the tropics. They are commonly encountered around seamounts. This species reaches a length of up to 100 centimetres (39 in) SL. This species is of minor importance to the commercial fisheries industry. Bigscale pomfrets are common marketed bycatch species in pelagic longline fisheries targeting Yellowfin tuna or Bigeye tuna. The overall color is dark metallic gray to black. The flesh is white. The pelvic fins are short and black with a brilliant white tip. The caudal fin is a symmetrical crescent with rounded tips. It has a clear white rear edge, widest at the center of the tail, tapering away towards the fin tips. The pectoral fin is transparent gray with a clear white rear edge. From Ireland there are only two records of this fish. The last being from Co. Wicklow. In Hawaii this fish is called "monchong", along with the Lustrous pomfret, Eumegistus illustris.
