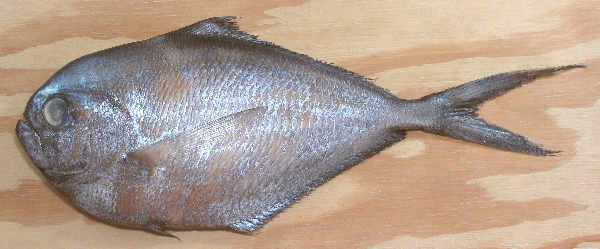

Scientific classification
- Kingdom: Animalia
- Phylum: Chordata
- Class: Actinopterygii
- Order: Scombriformes
- Family: Bramidae
- Genus: Brama
- Species: B. japonica

Binomial name
- Brama japonica Hilgendorf, 1878

= Brama japonica =

Pacific pomfret

Species of fish

Brama japonica, the Pacific pomfret, is a species of marine ray-finned fish, a pomfret of the family Bramidae. B. japonica is closely related, and quite similar, to Brama brama, but can be distinguished by possessing a greater number of anal fin rays and a higher number of gill rakers.

== Distribution and habitat ==
The type specimen for this species was from Japan and this is why it is named "japonica", though its range extends much further than Japan. Brama japonica is widely distributed throughout the Pacific Ocean, from the Sea of Japan to California and Peru, notably in the Northern Pacific. Its also been reported in Taiwan and the Philippines. Like many bramids, this species can be found throughout the high seas and is highly migratory, but oceanodromous. Though rarely caught inshore, it is a good food fish.

Pacific pomfrets are found at depths from 271 to 620 meters.

== Anatomy and appearance ==
=== Size ===
Averaging 30-42 cm in length, there have also been specimens reaching as great as 61cm. Although the maximum published weight for the species in 2.7kg (5.95lbs), the state record catch for a Pacific pomfret in Washington State is only 0.68 lbs. (0.3kg)

== Diet ==
Diet of adult B. japonica has been found to primarily consist of cephalopods and fish (primarily those in the genus Bathylagus), and secondarily amphipods.
