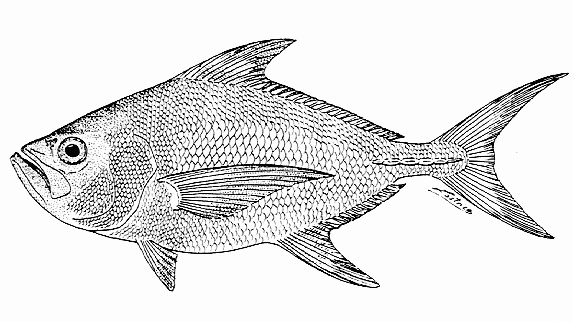
- Taractes rubescens

Scientific classification
- Kingdom: Animalia
- Phylum: Chordata
- Class: Actinopterygii
- Order: Scombriformes
- Family: Bramidae
- Genus: Taractes; R. T. Lowe, 1834

Type species
- Taractes asper Lowe, 1834

Synonyms
- Steinegeria D. S. Jordan & Evermann 1887; Trachyberyx Roule, 1929

= Taractes =

Genus of ray-finned fishes

Taractes is a genus of marine ray-finned fishes from the family Bramidae, the pomfrets. Taractes can be distinguished from other bramid genera but having a flat, or slightly curved profile, between the eyes (unlike the definitive arched profile present in the other genera) and by having scales on both the dorsal and anal fins (unlike Pterycombus and Pteraclis which lack these scales).

== Species ==
There are currently two recognized species in this genus:

- Taractes asper R. T. Lowe, 1843 (Rough pomfret)
- Taractes rubescens (D. S. Jordan & Evermann, 1887) (Pomfret)

These two species are easily distinguished from one another as adults. Adult T. rubescens develop a dense, bony keel on the caudal peduncle that is thought to be composed of enlarged, fused scales, which are absent in T. asper. Additionally, adult T. rubescens lack a noticeable lateral line, which is typically present in adult T. asper.

== Distribution ==
The genus is widely distributed across both Atlantic and Pacific oceans. T. asper has been documented to possess range from the Norwegian Sea to the Sea of Japan and Cape of Good Hope in Southern Africa. T. rubescens has been documented in the Gulf of Mexico and the Eastern and Central Pacific Ocean. Despite being found across all seas, they remain difficult to collect and are quite uncommon.
