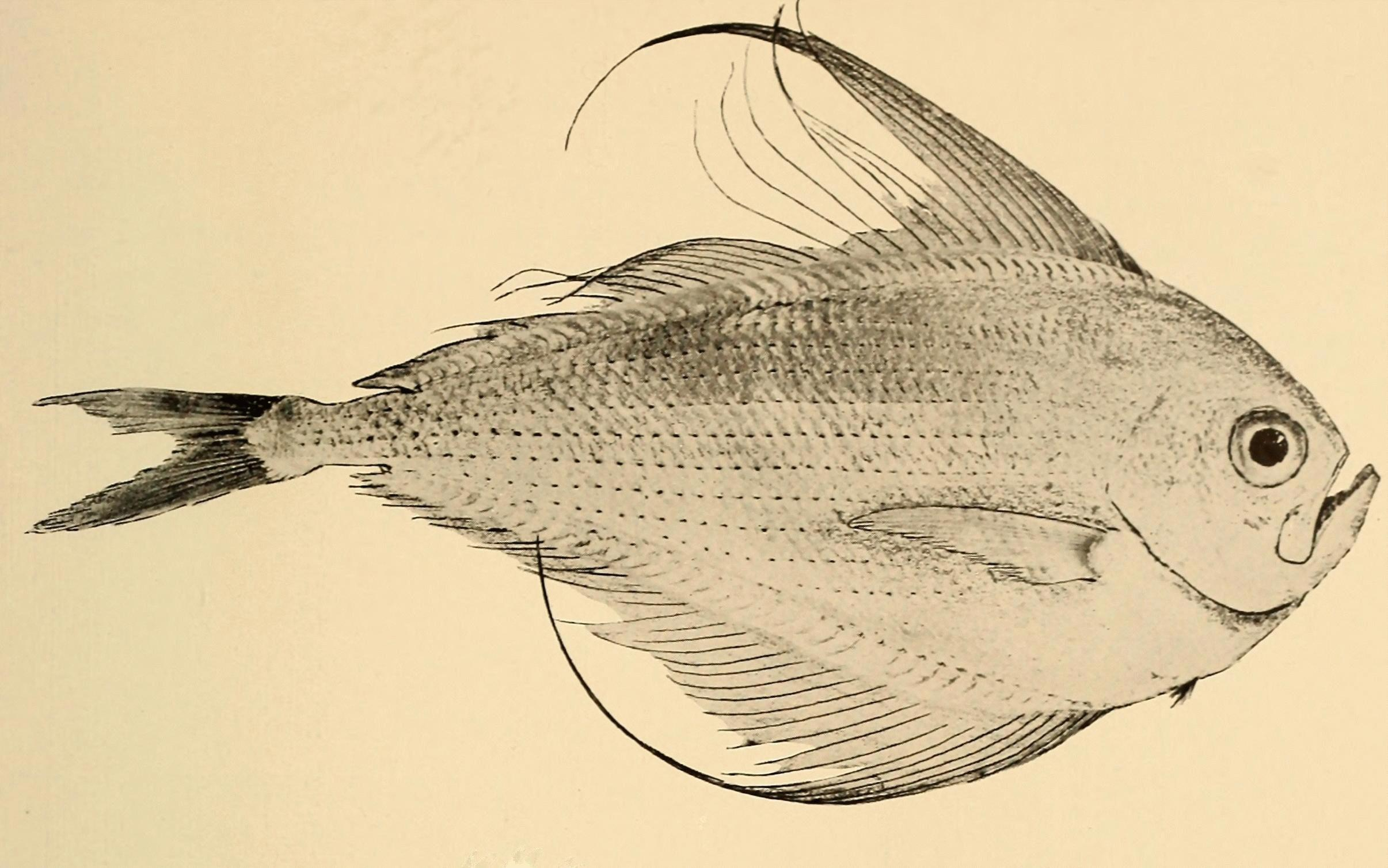
- Prickly Fanfish (Pterycombus petersii)

Scientific classification
- Domain: Eukaryota
- Kingdom: Animalia
- Phylum: Chordata
- Class: Actinopterygii
- Order: Scombriformes
- Family: Bramidae
- Genus: Pterycombus; Fries, 1837

Type species
- Pterycombus brama Fries, 1837

= Pterycombus =

Genus of ray-finned fishes

Pterycombus is a genus of pomfrets distinguished by greatly elongated dorsal and anal fins. Along with the genus Pteraclis, they are commonly referred to as fanfishes. Pterycombus can be distinguished from Pteraclis by examining the dorsal and anal fin rays, which should be relatively uniform in thickness to neighboring rays and by a lack of scales anterior to the dorsal fin.

== Species ==
Currently, there are two recognized species in this genus:

- Pterycombus brama, Atlantic fanfish (Fries, 1837)
- Pterycombus petersii, prickly fanfish (Hilgendorf, 1878)

== Species Distinction ==
Pterycombus brama can be distinguished from Pterycombus petersii by measuring the length of the longest dorsal and anal fin rays. In P. brama, the longest ray will be greater than half standard length, but will be less than half standard length in P. petersii. These two species can also be distinguished by geographic location. P. brama is generally distributed throughout the North and Central Atlantic Ocean, while P. petersii inhabits Pacific waters from Southern Africa to the Indo-Pacific. However, P. petersii has recently been found in the eastern North Pacific off the coast of Oregon, suggesting that it may have a greater distribution throughout Pacific waters.
