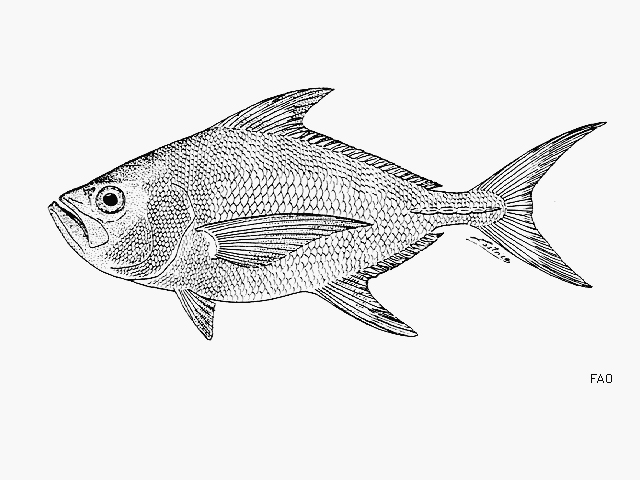
- Taractes rubescens, knifetail pomfret

Conservation status
- Least Concern (IUCN 3.1)

Scientific classification
- Kingdom: Animalia
- Phylum: Chordata
- Class: Actinopterygii
- Order: Scombriformes
- Family: Bramidae
- Genus: Taractes
- Species: T. rubescens

Binomial name
- Taractes rubescens (Jordan & Evermann, 1887)

Synonyms
- Steinegeria rubescens Jordan & Evermann, 1887

= Taractes rubescens =

Species of fish

Taractes rubescens, the pomfret, keeltail pomfret, knifetail pomfret or black pomfret, is a species of marine ray-finned fish, a pomfret of the family Bramidae. T. rubescens is closely related, and quite similar, to Taractes asper, but adults can most easily be distinguished by the bony keel present on the caudal peduncle. In fact, this bony keel is unique to Taractes rubescens and will distinguish it from all other bramids.

== Diet ==
T. rubescens have a varied diet consisting of marine invertebrates (including decapods and cephalopods) and, presumably, small fishes.

== Habitat and Ecology ==
As with most bramids,T. rubescens are epi- mesopelagic fish that are typically found at depths between 0-600m. They are highly migratory and believed to be solitary.

They are frequently found in the stomachs of large pelagic predator fishes, including billfish and tuna, suggesting that they play an important role in the diets of fast swimming, predatory fishes.

== Distribution ==
Tokiharu Abe suggested in personal communications with Giles W. Mead that T. rubscens adults are likely distributed throughout the tropical oceanic Pacific. Specimens at various stages of development have been collected throughout the Pacific Ocean, from the Sea of Japan to the coast of Hawaii. Limited collections have been made in the Atlantic Ocean, including the Gulf of Mexico and off the coast of Trinidad. T. rubscens had never been scientifically documented in the Indian Ocean until the year 2010, where it was reportedly collected in the Gulf of Aden, Arabian Sea. A single record was reported in 2016 from the Mediterranean Sea off Sicily. Despite their widespread distribution, they remain quite uncommon.
