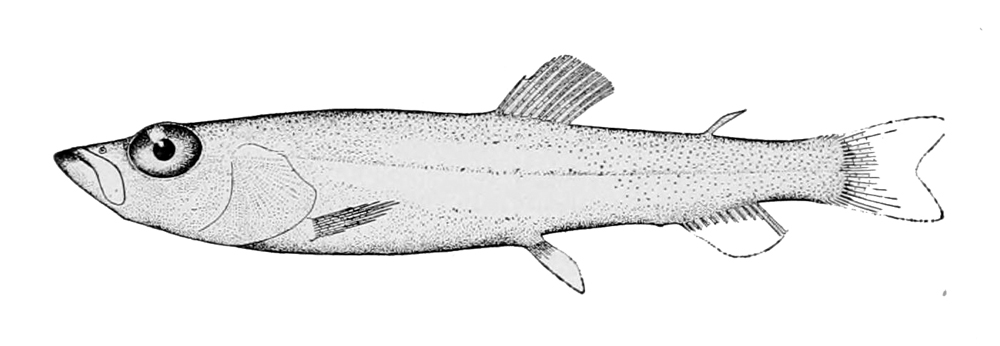

Scientific classification
- Kingdom: Animalia
- Phylum: Chordata
- Class: Actinopterygii
- Order: Argentiniformes
- Family: Bathylagidae
- Genus: Leuroglossus
- Species: L. stilbius

Binomial name
- Leuroglossus stilbius Gilbert, 1890

Synonyms
- Bathylagus stilbius (Gilbert, 1890); Bathylagus stilbius stilbius (Gilbert, 1890); Leuroglossus urotranus Bussing, 1965

= Leuroglossus stilbius =

Species of fish

The southern smoothtongue or California smoothtongue (Leuroglossus stilbius) is a type of ray-finned fish in the deep-sea smelt family Bathylagidae, that can grow to a length of 15 centimetres (6 in) TL. This fish is native to the northeastern Pacific Ocean from British Columbia to Oregon, and the Gulf of California where it is found at depths of 100 to 850 metres (300 to 2,800 ft).

== Description ==
The California smoothtongue is a slender fish growing to a length of about 15 centimetres (6 in). The dorsal fin has 9 to 12 soft rays, the anal fin 11 to 14, the pectoral fin 8 to 9 and the pelvic fin 8 to 10. The dorsal fin is set well back on the body and the tail fin is deeply forked. The pectoral fins are small and positioned low down on the belly. The fish is darker above and paler below, being silvery or bronze with pale-coloured fins. A distinguishing feature of this fish is that the length of the pointed snout is greater than the diameter of the eye. These fish are called "smoothtongue" because of their relative absence of teeth, with none on the premaxilla and tongue, and few on the jaws and the roof of the mouth.

== Biology ==
The California smoothtongue is the most common midwater fish off Santa Barbara, California. It makes daily vertical migrations. In the late afternoon and earlier part of the night it is to be found near the surface of the sea feeding mainly on salps and larvaceans; its mouth is adapted to pull in these inactive, gelatinous prey items by suction. It also consumes some ostracods, copepods and fish eggs. In the later part of the night it descends to deeper parts of the sea while in the morning it is at mid-depths. The fish has a double-chambered stomach, the first chamber having a black pigment in its lining which may prevent the light from luminescent prey it has swallowed from being visible from the exterior.

The Californian smoothtongue is an oviparous (egg-laying) fish. Both eggs and larvae drift with the plankton. This fish is plentiful at medium depths and forms part of the diet of larger fish, seabirds, sea lions, dolphins and the Humboldt squid.
