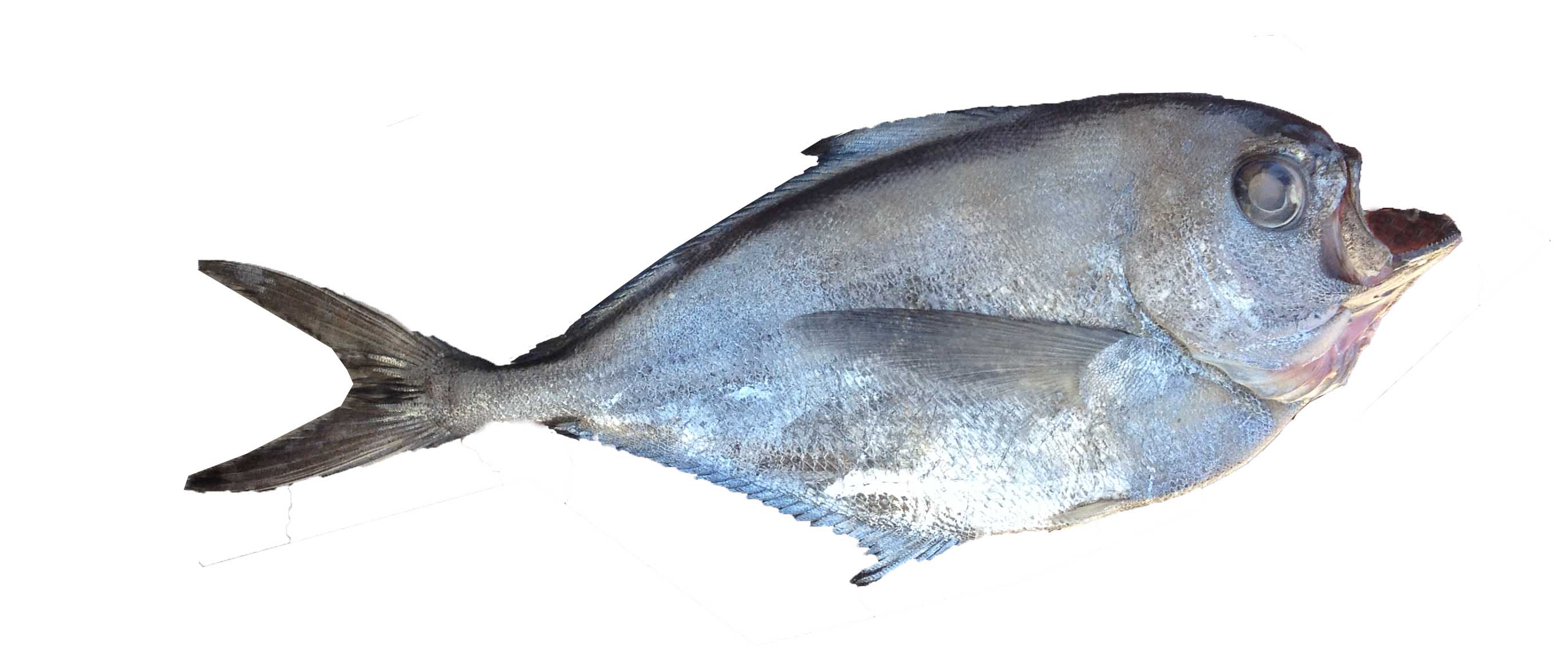

Scientific classification
- Kingdom: Animalia
- Phylum: Chordata
- Class: Actinopterygii
- Division: Teleostei
- Order: Scombriformes
- Family: Bramidae
- Genus: Brama
- Species: B. australis

Binomial name
- Brama australis Valenciennes, 1838

Synonyms
- Brama chilensis Guichenot, 1848

= Brama australis =

Species of fish

Brama australis, the southern rays bream or southern ray's bream is a species of marine ray-finned fish from the family Bramidae, the pomfrets. It is found circumglobally in the southern seas between 34°S and 48°S.

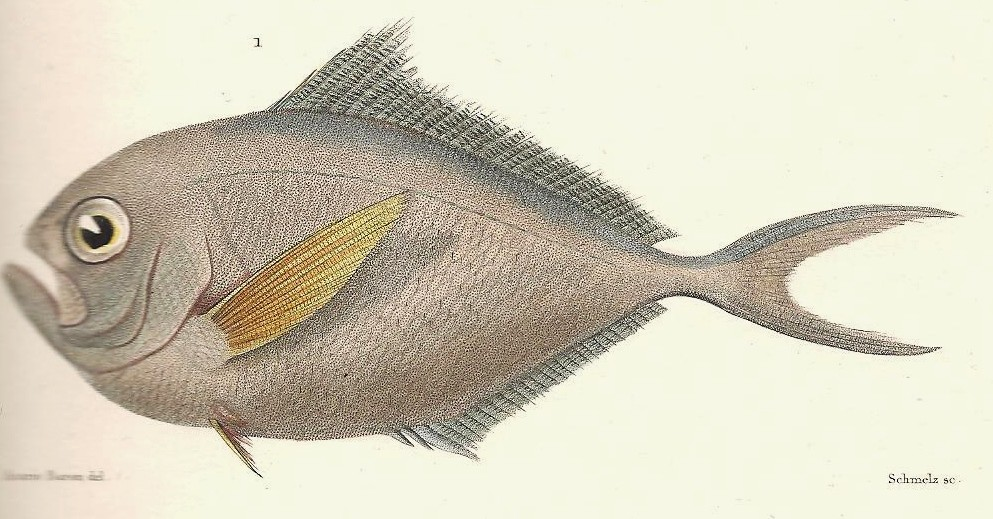
A drawing of a reineta fish

== Description ==
Brama australis has the typical laterally compressed body of a pomfret with a single dorsal fin which has no spines but contains stiffened fin rays. The anal fin also has no spines and contains fewer than 29 rays. The anal fin is similar to the dorsal fin but lacks the high anterior lobe of the dorsal fin. It grows to a maximum standard length of 53 centimetres (21 in).

== Distribution ==
Brama australis has circumglobal distribution in the southern seas between 34°S and 48°S. It is found throughout the subtropical to sub-antarctic waters of the whole Southern Pacific Ocean from New Zealand to Chile. It is a highly migratory species.

== Habitat and biology ==
Brama australis is a pelagic species which lives at depths of 15 to 120 metres (49 to 394 ft). It is a carnivorous species which feeds on the krill Euphasia mucronata in the southern summer off Chile, other crustaceans such as Pterygosquilla armata and hyperid amphipods are also important parts of its diet. It has also been reported to feed on crabs, squids and small fishes. It is a highly migratory species. It is a relatively fast growing species which can attain its full length in 8–9 years. It has been found to be host to 12 species of metazoan parasites, the most common were the copepod Hatschekia conifera with the larvae of the cestode Hepatoxylon trichiuri being the next most important.

== Utilisation ==
Brama australis is mainly caught using long lines and gill nets by artisanal fisheries off Chile. The species is heavily exploited and may be on the verge of being overfished. Rarely caught elsewhere, usually as bycatch in tuna fisheries.

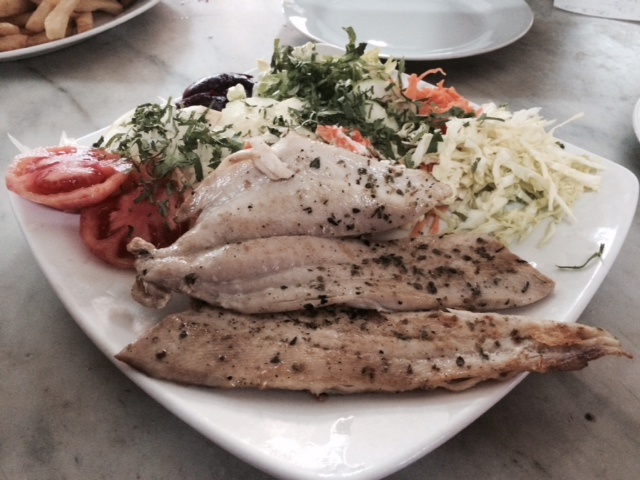
"Reineta a la mantequilla" with mixed salad, a typical Valparaiso dish

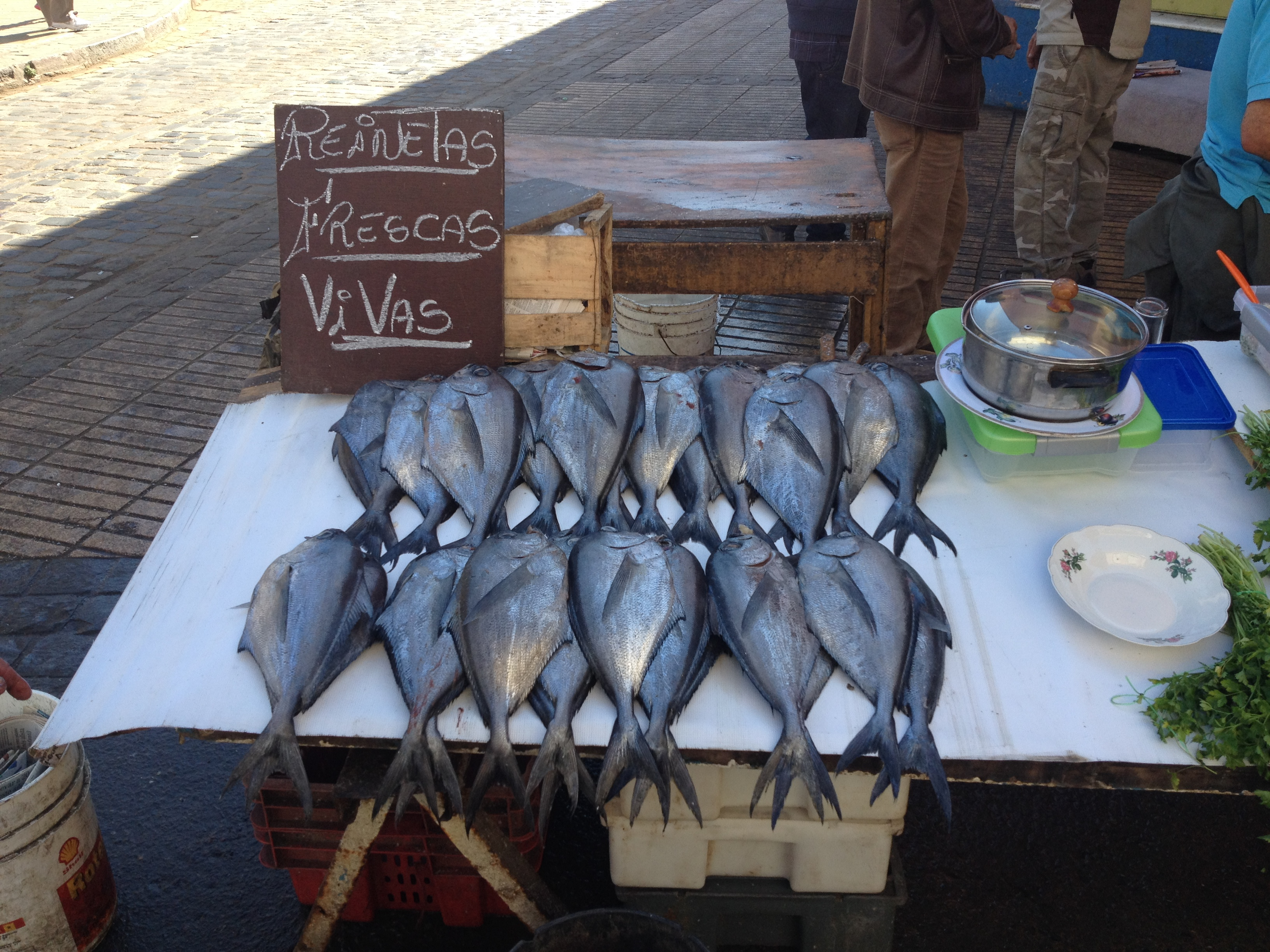
Reineta on sale at a Valparaiso market stall
