= Northern smoothtongue =

Scientific classification
- Kingdom: Animalia
- Phylum: Chordata
- Class: Actinopterygii
- Order: Argentiniformes
- Family: Bathylagidae
- Genus: Leuroglossus
- Species: L. schmidti

Binomial name
- Leuroglossus schmidti Rass (ru), 1955

Species of fish

The Northern smoothtongue (Leuroglossus schmidti) is a type of deepwater fish that can grow to a length of 15 centimetres (5.9 in) TL. The fish are native from the Pacific Ocean to Oregon, United States and also to the Gulf of California where they are found at depths of 100 to 690 metres (330 to 2,260 ft).
