= Brama pauciradiata =

Scientific classification
- Kingdom: Animalia
- Phylum: Chordata
- Class: Actinopterygii
- Order: Scombriformes
- Family: Bramidae
- Genus: Brama
- Species: B. pauciradiata

Binomial name
- Brama pauciradiata Moteki, Fujita & Last, 1995

Species of ray-finned fish

Brama pauciradiata is a species of pomfret native to Australia and the Coral Sea.
