= Bramoides =

Bramoides Temporal range: Lower Eocene

Scientific classification
- Kingdom: Animalia
- Phylum: Chordata
- Class: Actinopterygii
- Division: Teleostei
- Order: Scombriformes
- Family: Bramidae
- Genus: †Bramoides; Casier, 1966
- Species: †B. brieni

Binomial name
- †Bramoides brieni Casier, 1966

Extinct genus of fishes

Bramoides is an extinct genus of marine ray-finned fish that lived during the lower Eocene. It contains a single species, B. brieni, known from the London Clay.

It is generally considered an early pomfret, hence the name Bramoides (meaning "similar to Brama"). However, this placement has been doubted by other authors, although alternate placements have not been suggested.

== See also ==
- Prehistoric fish
- List of prehistoric bony fish
