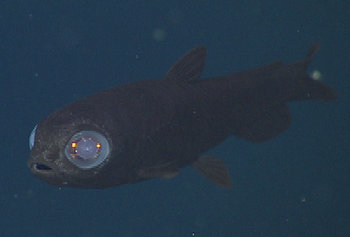

Conservation status
- Least Concern (IUCN 3.1)

Scientific classification
- Kingdom: Animalia
- Phylum: Chordata
- Class: Actinopterygii
- Order: Argentiniformes
- Family: Bathylagidae
- Genus: Pseudobathylagus; Kobyliansky, 1986
- Species: P. milleri

Binomial name
- Pseudobathylagus milleri (D. S. Jordan & C. H. Gilbert, 1898)

= Pseudobathylagus =

Species of fish (AKA stout blacksmelt and owlfish)

Pseudobathylagus milleri, the Stout blacksmelt, also called the Owlfish due to its large eyes relative to its body, is a species of deep-sea smelt native to the north Pacific Ocean where it is found to depths of 6,600 m (21,700 ft). This species grows to a length of 16.5 cm (6.5 in). It is the only species in the genus Pseudobathylagus.

== Description, taxonomy, and etymology ==
Pseudobathylagus milleri is a deep-sea smelt that was originally characterized as Bathylagus milleri by D. S. Jordan and C. H. Gilbert in 1898 based on a specimen collected at Cortes Bank, 1,419 m (4,660 ft) from the surface. It was named after their linguist colleague at Stanford University, Walter Miller, for his contribution to zoological nomenclature. In 1939, W. M. Chapman described a new species Bathylagus alascanus, named after the location they were collected from, Alaska. However, Chapman's specimens were later considered to be also B. milleri. In 1986, N. V. Parin described anatomical differences compared to Bathylagus species, such as the absence of orbitosphenoid and postcleithrum. He thus reclassified it to Pseudobathylagus milleri (from Greek ψεύδης, pseudés = false), which is currently the only species under Pseudobathylagus. Parin also noted that the eyes of larvae are not stalked, which is a common feature among Bathylagus. The eyes are remarkably larger compared to other fishes in Bathylagidae as well, leading to the common name "Owlfish".

== Ecology ==
Pseudobathylagus milleri is widely distributed across the North Pacific Ocean, having been spotted from the east coast of Japan to the west coast of the U.S., and as far north as the Bering Sea. As a deep-sea smelt, Pseudobathylagus milleri generally lives in the mesopelagic and bathypelagic zones of the ocean. Nevertheless, specimens have been collected from depths of as shallow as 250 m (820 ft) and as deep as 6,600 m (21,700 ft).

Their diet include small crustaceans such as Copepoda and Gammaridea. Gut content examination also found parasitic digenean trematodes in Pseudobathylagus milleri, including Aponurus argentini in the stomach, and Steringophorus congeri and Paraccacladium sp. in the intestine.

== Reproduction and development ==
The reproduction of Pseudobathylagus milleri is oviparous. Larvae have been reported to be more abundant during spring from December to April. The larvae are about 5 mm long when hatching. The body length of adults can range from below 10 cm (3.9 in) to over 20 cm (7.9 in).

== Genetics ==
Pseudobathylagus milleri has 30 pairs of chromosomes (2n = 60). They vary greatly in size, with the X chromosome being the largest and about twice of the next largest, seven pairs of intermediate sizes, and the Y chromosome among the smallest, dot-like chromosomes. The nuclear genome has not been sequenced, but partial sequences of some mitochondrial genes, including cytochrome oxidase subunit I and cytochrome b, are available for DNA barcoding.
