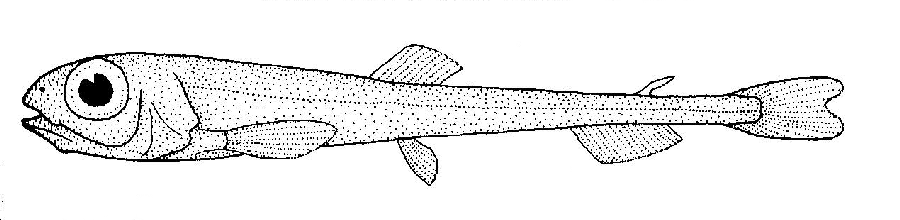
- Drawing by Dr Tony Ayling

Scientific classification
- Domain: Eukaryota
- Kingdom: Animalia
- Phylum: Chordata
- Class: Actinopterygii
- Order: Argentiniformes
- Family: Bathylagidae
- Genus: Bathylagus
- Species: B. antarcticus

Binomial name
- Bathylagus antarcticus Günther, 1878

= Bathylagus antarcticus =

Species of fish

Bathylagus antarcticus, the Antarctic deep-sea smelt, is a deep-sea smelt found around the Southern Ocean as far south as Antarctica, to depths of 4,000 metres (13,000 ft). This species grows to a length of 14 centimetres (5.5 in) SL.
