= Bathylagoides wesethi =

Scientific classification
- Kingdom: Animalia
- Phylum: Chordata
- Class: Actinopterygii
- Order: Argentiniformes
- Family: Bathylagidae
- Genus: Bathylagoides
- Species: B. wesethi

Binomial name
- Bathylagoides wesethi (Bolin, 1938)

Synonyms
- Bathylagus wesethi Bolin, 1938

Species of fish

The snubnose blacksmelt (Bathylagoides wesethi) is a species of ray-finned fish in the deep-sea smelt family Bathylagidae. It is native to the northeastern Pacific Ocean.

== Description ==
The snubnose blacksmelt is a small, laterally-compressed, elongated fish, deepest near the head and tapering towards the tail. The snout is rounded and has a terminal, diagonal mouth; its length is about half the diameter of the rather large eye. The dorsal fin has ten to fourteen soft rays and is set well back on the body. The anal fin has thirteen to seventeen soft rays. The pectoral fins are small and set very low on the underside of the body. The colour is dark brown above with black spots and a black patch around the operculum, which extends halfway up the body. The flanks are silvery-grey and the fins lack pigment. The caudal peduncle is narrow, the caudal fin is short, and the lateral line, which is high on the body, extends into the tail fin. The maximum length to which this fish grows is about 13.5 cm (5.3 in).

== Distribution and habitat ==
The snubnose blacksmelt is found in deep water in the Pacific Ocean off the western coast of North America. Its range extends from 45°N to 21°N, and from 126°W to 109°W. Its depth range is between about 25 and 1,130 m (80 and 3,710 ft).
