= Xenobrama =

Scientific classification
- Kingdom: Animalia
- Phylum: Chordata
- Class: Actinopterygii
- Division: Teleostei
- Order: Scombriformes
- Family: Bramidae
- Genus: Xenobrama; Yatsu & I. Nakamura, 1989
- Species: X. microlepis

Binomial name
- Xenobrama microlepis Yatsu & I. Nakamura, 1989

Species of fish

Xenobrama microlepis, the golden pomfret, is a species of pomfret, a type of fish, found in the Subantarctic Pacific Ocean. This species is known to grow to a length of 49.4 centimetres (19.4 in) SL. This species is the only known member of the genus Xenobrama. Xenobrama microlepis is a combination of the Greek word xenos and microlepis with Brama, meaning "strange Brama with small scales".

== Description ==
Xenobrama microlepis was first described in 1989 by Akihiko Yatsu and Izumi Nakamura. While similar to fishes in the related genus Brama, Xenobrama microlepis is unique in that it possesses short, stout gill rakers and smaller scales that are greater in number. Other characters that are unique to this species include a narrow subpectoral region, a wide interpelvic region, and lower mandible edges that come together to touch.

== Distribution ==
Xenobrama microlepis is reported to be widely distributed throughout the high seas of the South Pacific Ocean. Despite this, it remains to be rarely caught or seen.

== Diet ==
There is little information pertaining to the diet of X. microlepis. Limited collections of stomach contents revealed a number of different food items, including squid, other fishes, and amphipods.
