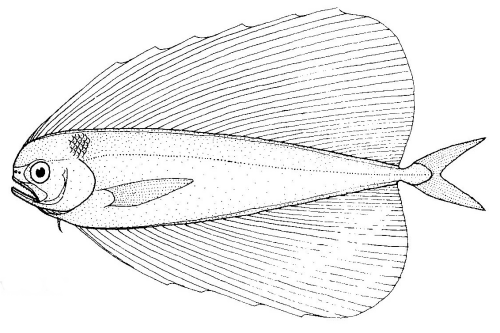
- Drawing by Dr Tony Ayling

Scientific classification
- Kingdom: Animalia
- Phylum: Chordata
- Class: Actinopterygii
- Division: Teleostei
- Order: Scombriformes
- Family: Bramidae
- Genus: Pteraclis
- Species: P. velifera

Binomial name
- Pteraclis velifera (Pallas, 1770)

Synonyms
- Coryphaena velifera Pallas, 1770; Pteraclis pinnata Gronow, 1772; Pteraclis ocellatus Valenciennes, 1833; Pteraclis trichipterus Valenciennes, 1833; Pteraclis guttatus Valenciennes, 1833

= Spotted fanfish =

Species of ray-finned fish

The spotted fanfish (Pteraclis velifera) is a species of pomfret found in the Indian and western Pacific oceans from South Africa to New Zealand. It is found at depths to 500 metres (1,600 ft). It reaches a length of 50 centimetres (20 in) TL.
