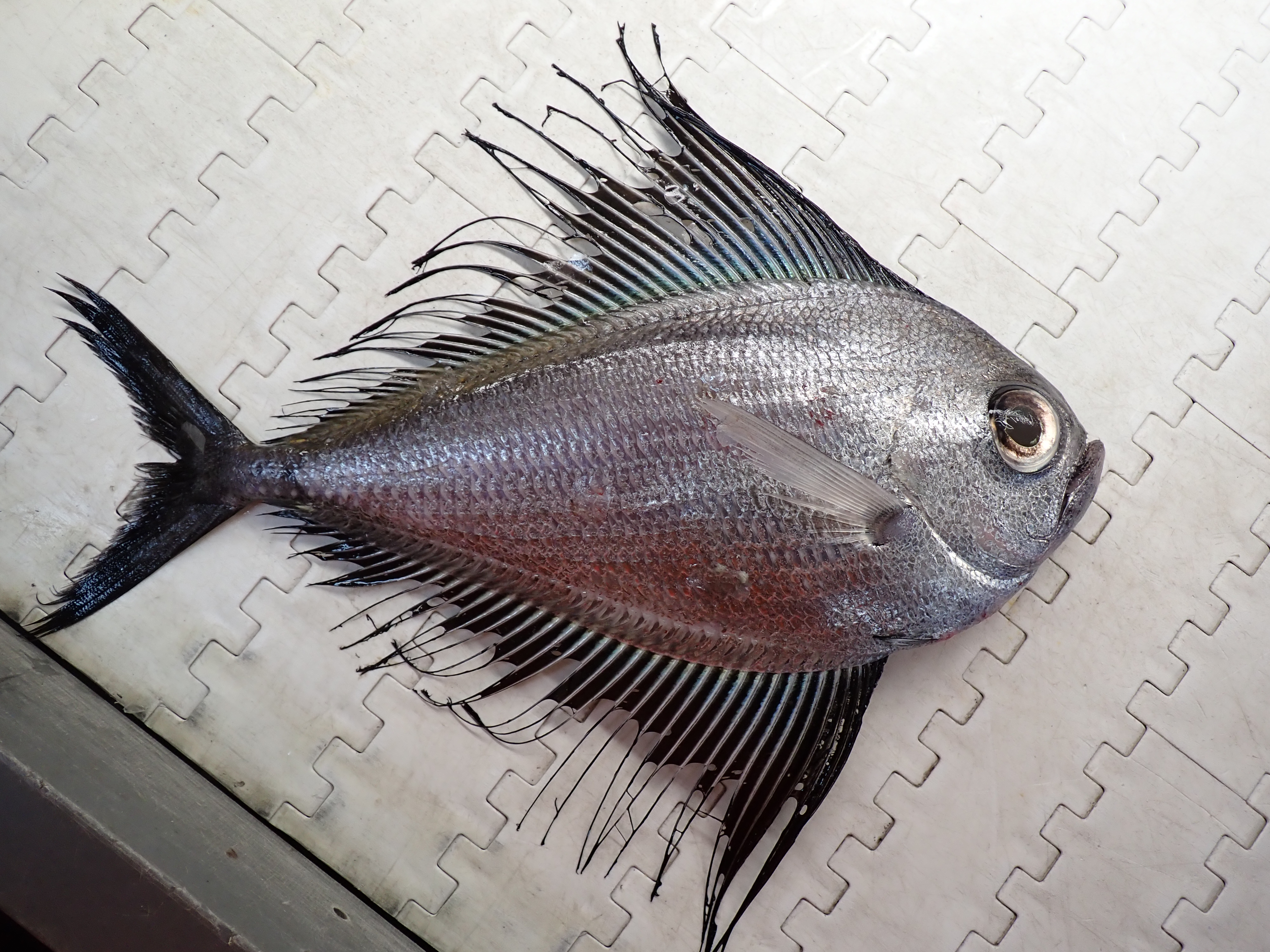

Scientific classification
- Kingdom: Animalia
- Phylum: Chordata
- Class: Actinopterygii
- Order: Scombriformes
- Family: Bramidae
- Genus: Pterycombus
- Species: P. brama

Binomial name
- Pterycombus brama Fries, 1837

= Pterycombus brama =

Species of ray-finned fish

Pterycombus brama is a species of ray-finned fish belonging to the family Bramidae (pomfrets).

It is native to the Atlantic Ocean.
