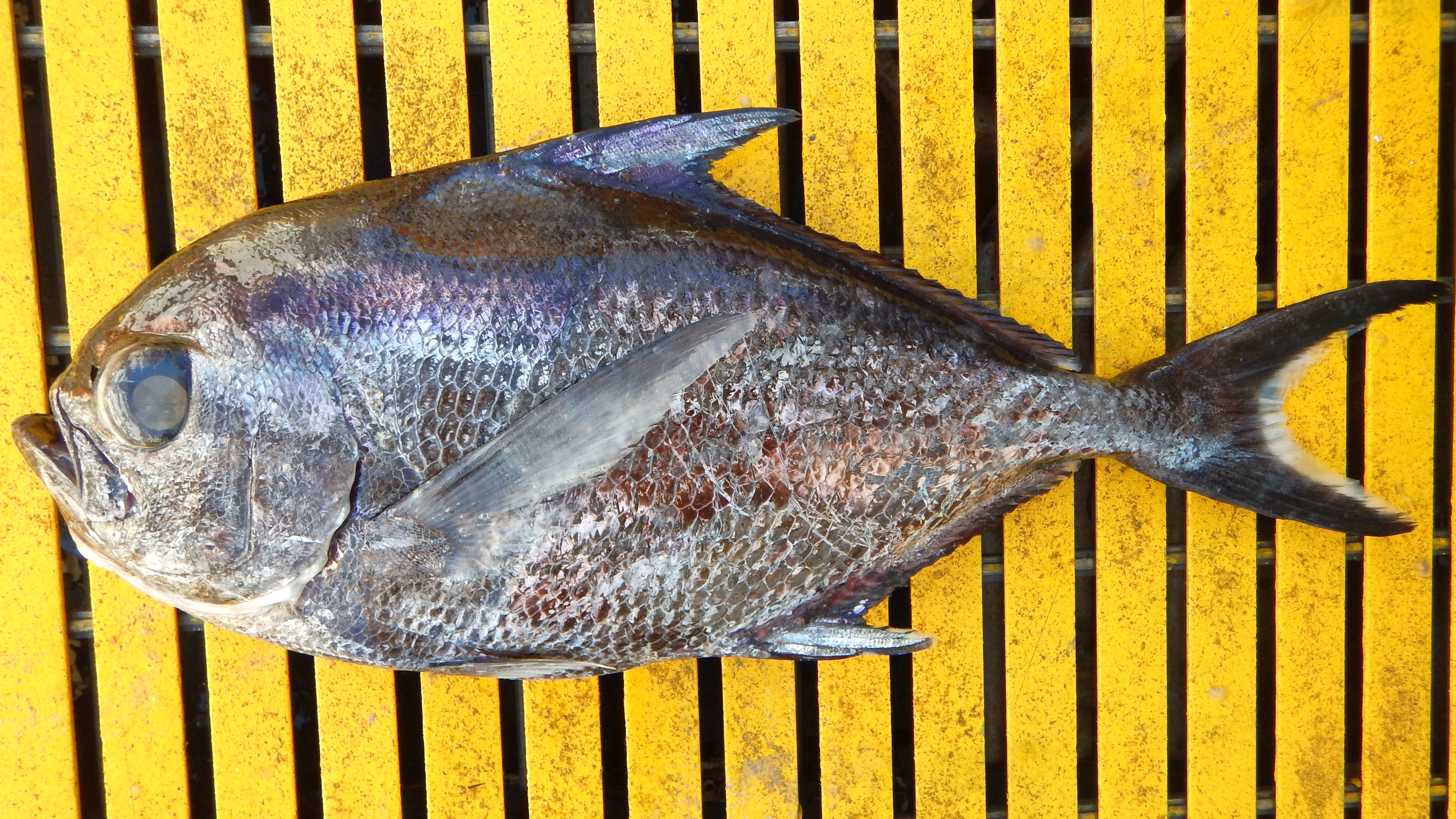

Scientific classification
- Kingdom: Animalia
- Phylum: Chordata
- Class: Actinopterygii
- Order: Scombriformes
- Family: Bramidae
- Genus: Taractichthys
- Species: T. steindachneri

Binomial name
- Taractichthys steindachneri (Döderlein, 1883)

Synonyms
- Argo steindachneri Döderlein, 1883; Taractes steindachneri (Döderlein, 1883); Taractes miltonis Whitley, 1938

= Taractichthys steindachneri =

Species of fish

Taractichthys steindachneri, the sickle pomfret, is a species of marine ray-finned fish, a pomfret of the family Bramidae. It is found in the Indian and Pacific Oceans.

== Etymology ==
The fish is named in honor of Austrian ichthyologist Franz Steindachner (1834-1919), who collaborated with Döderlein in studying the many fishes of Japan.

== Description ==
Taractichthys steindachneri has a moderately compressed deep body, its depth being around half its standard length, which is silvery-black in colour. They have a forked caudal fin. It has white margins on the anal, caudal, and pelvic fins and large hard scales which cover the whole of the body, each having a spine. The exception is that there are areas lacking scales above and behind the eye. The head is round with a blunt snout and large eyes. The oblique mouth opens at the front and its upper and lower jaws are equipped with small, curved canine teeth. The dorsal and anal fins have high anterior lobes which change in shape and height with growth. These fins are covered in scales and cannot be withdrawn into a groove. Adult fish do not have a lateral line. The anal fin has 26 to 28 rays and the dorsal fin has 33 to 37 rays. The pectoral fins are positioned low on the body with the pelvic fins placed immediately in front of the pectoral fins. The maximum published total length is 60 centimetres (24 in) and a maximum published weight of 11 kilograms (24 lb).

== Distribution ==
Taractichthys steindachneri is found in the Indian and Pacific Oceans from East Africa to California and Baja California.

== Habitat and biology ==
Taractichthys steindachneri is a mesopelagic fish, found at depths of 53–700 metres (174–2,297 ft) and it is frequently recorded in the vicinities of seamounts and the edges of continental shelves. They are predators which feed on a variety of prey including fishes, cephalopods, tunicates and crustaceans. The juveniles are prey for tuna and swordfish while the adults have been recorded being preyed on by deep-foraging bigeye, albacores, swordfish and large sharks. They are broadcast spawners, releasing the eggs into the water column. They live for up to 8 years.

== Utilisation ==
Taractichthys steindachneri is caught by pelagic longlining and some deepwater hook-and-line fisheries. The flesh has a firm texture with a mild flavour, having large flakes and a pinkish-white colour. The high oil content of the flesh means that it can be cooked by grilling, broiling, baking and sauteing; it is also suitable for sushi.
