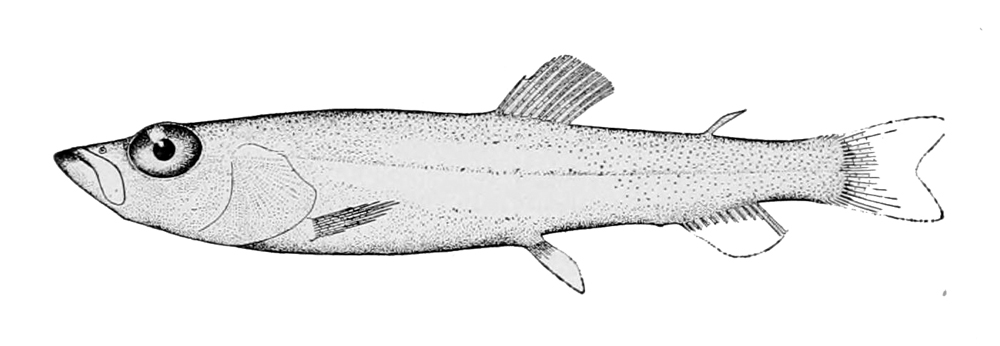
- California Smoothtongue (Leuroglossus stilbius)

Scientific classification
- Domain: Eukaryota
- Kingdom: Animalia
- Phylum: Chordata
- Class: Actinopterygii
- Order: Argentiniformes
- Family: Bathylagidae
- Genus: Leuroglossus; C. H. Gilbert, 1890

= Leuroglossus =

Genus of fishes

Leuroglossus is a genus of deep-sea smelts found in the Pacific Ocean.

== Species ==
Three recognized species are in this genus:

- Leuroglossus callorhini (F. A. Lucas, 1899)
- Leuroglossus schmidti Rass (ru), 1955 (northern smoothtongue)
- Leuroglossus stilbius C. H. Gilbert, 1890 (California smoothtongue)
