= Dolicholagus =

Scientific classification
- Kingdom: Animalia
- Phylum: Chordata
- Class: Actinopterygii
- Order: Argentiniformes
- Family: Bathylagidae
- Genus: Dolicholagus; Kobyliansky, 1986
- Species: D. longirostris

Binomial name
- Dolicholagus longirostris (Maul, 1948)

Species of fish

Dolicholagus longirostris, the longsnout blacksmelt, is a species of deep-sea smelt found circumglobally in deep waters of the tropics and subtropics. It is found at depths of 200 to 945 m (656 to 3,100 ft). This species grows to a length of 17.5 cm (6.9 in).
