= Lipolagus =

Scientific classification
- Kingdom: Animalia
- Phylum: Chordata
- Class: Actinopterygii
- Order: Argentiniformes
- Family: Bathylagidae
- Genus: Lipolagus; Kobyliansky, 1986
- Species: L. ochotensis

Binomial name
- Lipolagus ochotensis (P. J. Schmidt, 1938)

Species of fish

Lipolagus ochotensis, the eared blacksmelt, is a species of deep-sea smelt found in the Pacific Ocean down to depths of 6,100 m (20,000 ft). This species grows to a length of 16 cm (6.3 in).
