= Bathylagichthys =

Scientific classification
- Kingdom: Animalia
- Phylum: Chordata
- Class: Actinopterygii
- Order: Argentiniformes
- Family: Bathylagidae
- Genus: Bathylagichthys; Kobyliansky, 1986

Genus of fishes

Bathylagichthys is a genus of deep-sea smelts.

== Species ==
The six recognized species in this genus are:

- Bathylagichthys australis Kobyliansky, 1990 (southern deep-sea smelt)
- Bathylagichthys greyae Cohen, 1958 (Grey's deep-sea smelt)
- Bathylagichthys kobylianskyi Gon & A. L. Stewart, 2014
- Bathylagichthys longipinnis Kobyliansky, 1985
- Bathylagichthys parini Kobyliansky, 1990
- Bathylagichthys problematicus Lloris & Rucabado, 1985
