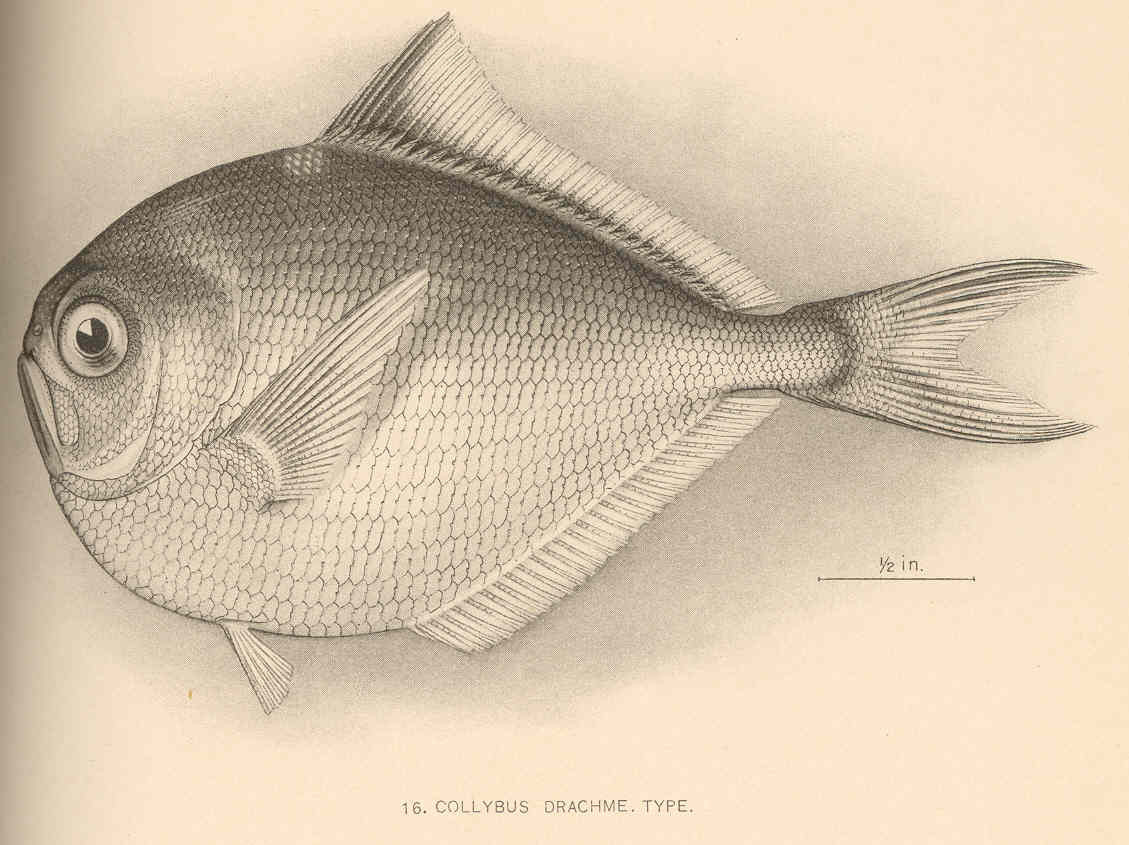

Scientific classification
- Kingdom: Animalia
- Phylum: Chordata
- Class: Actinopterygii
- Order: Scombriformes
- Family: Bramidae
- Genus: Brama
- Species: B. orcini

Binomial name
- Brama orcini Cuvier, 1831

= Brama orcini =

Species of Actinopterygii

Brama orcini is a species of scombriform ray-finned fish in the family Bramidae (pomfrets).
