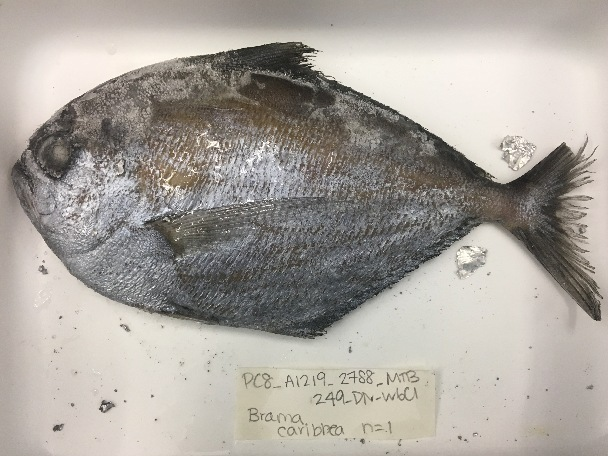

Conservation status
- Least Concern (IUCN 3.1)

Scientific classification
- Kingdom: Animalia
- Phylum: Chordata
- Class: Actinopterygii
- Order: Scombriformes
- Family: Bramidae
- Genus: Brama
- Species: B. caribbea

Binomial name
- Brama caribbea Mead, 1972

= Brama caribbea =

Caribbean pomfret

Species of fish

Brama caribbea, the Caribbean pomfret, is a species of marine ray-finned fish, a pomfret of the family Bramidae. It is found in the Western Atlantic Ocean.

== Description ==
Brama caribbea can be distinguished from congeners through the following characteristics:

- Possessing pectoral fins that are placed high on the body in both juvenile and adult stages
- Having relatively short ventral fins
- Possessing fewer than 60 scales in a horizontal series between the gill opening and caudal fin base
- Having a total number of vertebrae equaling 38 or fewer (modally 36)
- Having 19–21 pectoral fin rays

== Distribution ==
Brama caribbea, appears to be more closely associated with landmasses than its congeners, specifically those associated with the Caribbean (from which its name is derived) and the Northeastern coastal waters of Brazil.

== Diet ==
Brama caribbea consumes a range of food items, but primarily forages for crustaceans (~48% of their diet, largely being euphausiacids and Brachyscelus crusculum), fishes (28%, primarily myctophids and Acanthurus species), and cephalopods (15%, including enoploteuthids and ommastrephids).

== Reproduction ==
Brama caribbea spawns during the winter, beginning in late August and ending in May, and appears to occur throughout the distribution of the species rather than a central location. However, data are limited.
