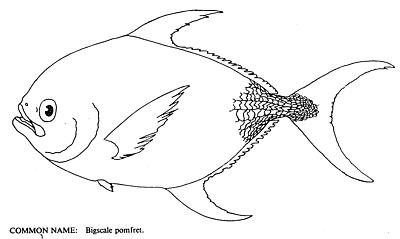
- Big-scale pomfret (T. longipinnis)

Scientific classification
- Kingdom: Animalia
- Phylum: Chordata
- Class: Actinopterygii
- Order: Scombriformes
- Family: Bramidae
- Genus: Taractichthys; Mead & Maul, 1958

Type species
- Brama longipinnis Lowe, 1843

Synonyms
- Argo Döderlein, 1883

= Taractichthys =

Genus of ray-finned fishes

Taractichthys is a genus of marine ray-finned fishes from the family Bramidae, the pomfrets.

== Species ==
There are currently two recognized species in this genus:

- Taractichthys longipinnis (R. T. Lowe, 1843) (Big-scale pomfret)
- Taractichthys steindachneri (Döderlein (de), 1883) (Sickle pomfret)
