= Melanolagus =

Scientific classification
- Kingdom: Animalia
- Phylum: Chordata
- Class: Actinopterygii
- Order: Argentiniformes
- Family: Bathylagidae
- Genus: Melanolagus; Kobyliansky, 1986
- Species: M. bericoides

Binomial name
- Melanolagus bericoides (Borodin, 1929)

Species of fish

Melanolagus bericoides (the bigscale deep-sea smelt) is a species of deep-sea smelt, found in oceans such as the Atlantic, Indian, and Pacific. It is widely distributed in tropical and subtropical oceans to a depth of 1,700 m (5,600 ft), and the species grows to a length of 20 cm (7.9 in). Its original name is Scopelus bericoides Borodin 1929 and it belongs to the family Melanolagus Kobyliansky, 1986.
