= Brama myersi =

Scientific classification
- Domain: Eukaryota
- Kingdom: Animalia
- Phylum: Chordata
- Class: Actinopterygii
- Order: Scombriformes
- Family: Bramidae
- Genus: Brama
- Species: B. myersi

Binomial name
- Brama myersi Mead, 1972

Species of ray-finned fish

Brama myersi is a species of scombriform ray-finned fish in the family Bramidae.
