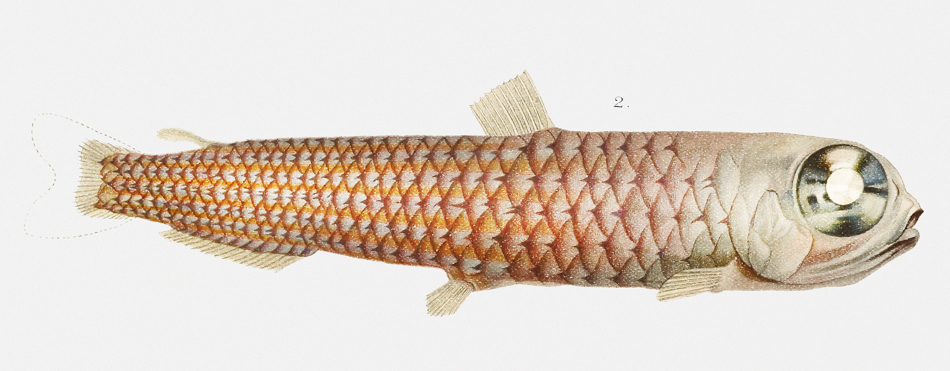

Scientific classification
- Kingdom: Animalia
- Phylum: Chordata
- Class: Actinopterygii
- Order: Argentiniformes
- Family: Bathylagidae
- Genus: Bathylagus
- Species: B. euryops

Binomial name
- Bathylagus euryops Goode & T. H. Bean, 1896

= Goiter blacksmelt =

Species of fish

The goiter blacksmelt (Bathylagus euryops) is a species of deep-sea smelt found in the North Atlantic Ocean. It is the biomass-dominant pelagic fish over the Mid-Atlantic Ridge when the entire water column is fully considered. The water-column in which it resides is 500 to 3,237 m (1,640 to 10,620 ft) deep. No topographic trapping can be performed on the species as they do not vertically migrate. This species grows to a length of 13 cm (5.1 in).
