= Bathylagoides =

Scientific classification
- Domain: Eukaryota
- Kingdom: Animalia
- Phylum: Chordata
- Class: Actinopterygii
- Order: Argentiniformes
- Family: Bathylagidae
- Genus: Bathylagoides; Whitley, 1951

Genus of fishes

Bathylagoides is a genus of deep-sea smelts.

== Species ==
Three recognized species are in this genus:

- Bathylagoides argyrogaster (Norman, 1930) (silver deepsea smelt)
- Bathylagoides greyae (A. E. Parr, 1931) (blackchin blacksmelt)
- Bathylagoides wesethi (Bolin, 1938) (snubnose blacksmelt)
