= Goniocranion =

Goniocranion Temporal range: Lower Eocene

Scientific classification
- Kingdom: Animalia
- Phylum: Chordata
- Class: Actinopterygii
- Division: Teleostei
- Clade: Acanthomorpha
- Genus: †Goniocranion; Casier, 1966
- Species: †G. arambourgi

Binomial name
- †Goniocranion arambourgi Casier, 1966

Extinct genus of fishes

Goniocranion is an extinct genus of prehistoric marine ray-finned fish that lived during the lower Eocene. It contains a single species, G. arambourgi from the London Clay of England. Initially described as an early pomfret, it may instead be a lampriform.

== See also ==
- Prehistoric fish
- List of prehistoric bony fish
