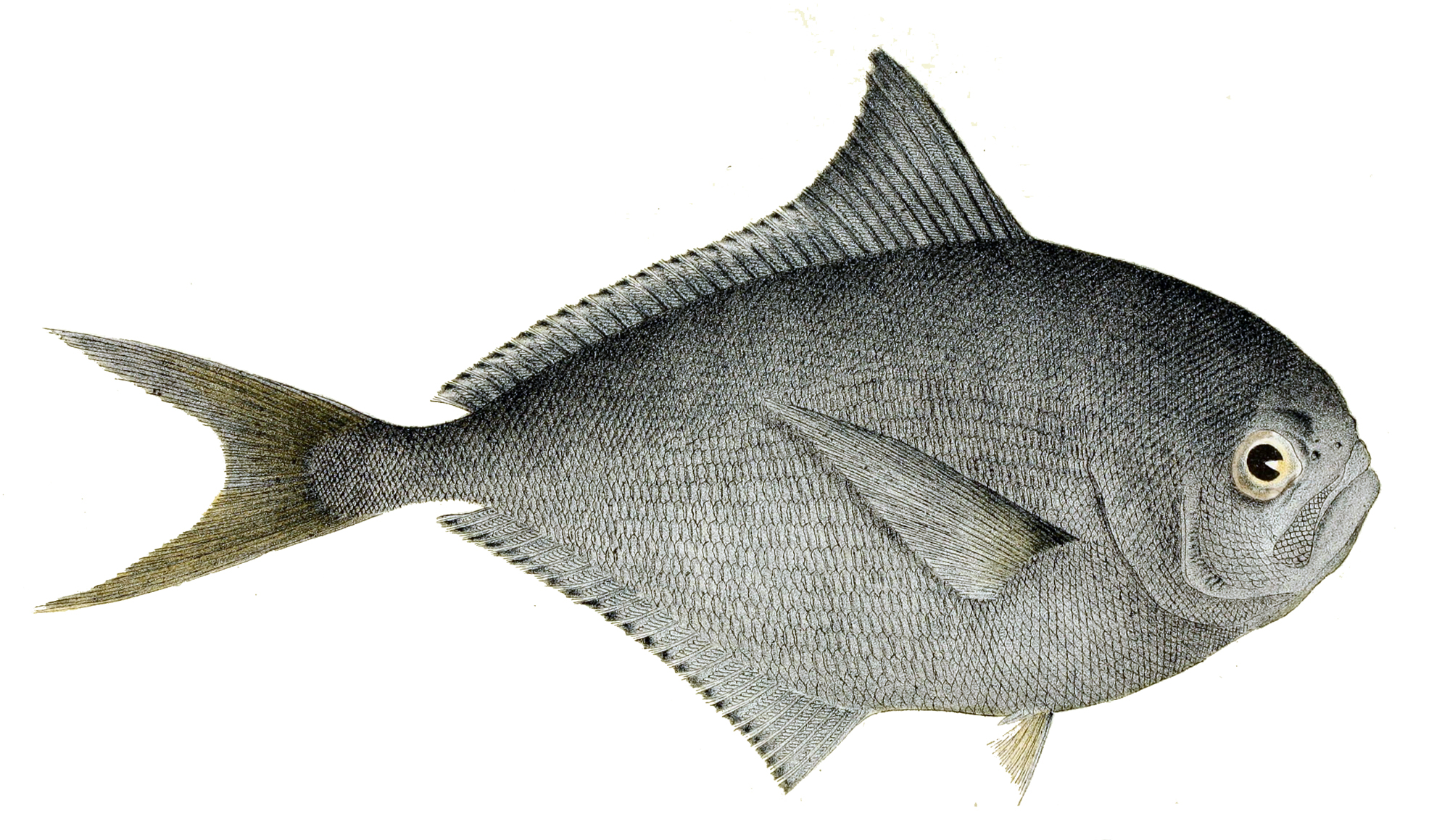

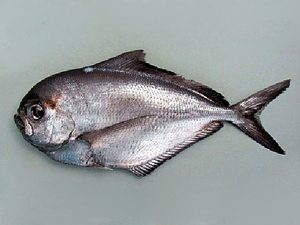

Conservation status
- Least Concern (IUCN 3.1)

Scientific classification
- Kingdom: Animalia
- Phylum: Chordata
- Class: Actinopterygii
- Division: Teleostei
- Order: Scombriformes
- Family: Bramidae
- Genus: Brama
- Species: B. brama

Binomial name
- Brama brama (Bonnaterre, 1788)

Synonyms
- Sparus brama Bonnaterre, 1788; Sparus dentatus Berkenhout, 1789; Lepidotus catalonicus Asso, 1801; Brama raji Bloch & Schneider, 1801; Sparus raji (Bloch & Schneider, 1801); Sparus castaneola Lacépède, 1802; Sparus niger Turton, 1804; Lepodus saragus Rafinesque, 1810; Brama marina Fleming, 1828; Brama chilensis Guichenot, 1848; Lepidotus chilensis (Guichenot, 1848); Brama pinnasquamata Couch, 1849; Chaetodon umbratus Cabrera, Pérez & Haenseler, 1857; Toxotes squamosus Hutton, 1875; Brama squamosa (Hutton, 1875); Lepodus squamosus (Hutton, 1875)

= Atlantic pomfret =

Species of fish

The Atlantic pomfret (Brama brama), also known as Ray's bream, is a species of marine ray-finned fish, a pomfret of the family Bramidae. It is found in the Atlantic, Indian, and South Pacific Oceans, at depths down to 1,000 m (3,300 ft).

Its length is between 40 and 100 cm (16 and 39 in). In South Africa, where it is a common bycatch of the hake fishery, it is generally known and sold as "angelfish", although it is not a true marine angelfish.

The Atlantic pomfret has very significant migration patterns which greatly depend on the temperature of intermediate waters, but are also affected by secondary reactions from density dependence and the climatic conditions of the surface. Although the species was first recorded in Irish waters in 1843, it was still regarded as scarce up until the late 1950s, but between the 1960s and 1970s large numbers were recorded.
