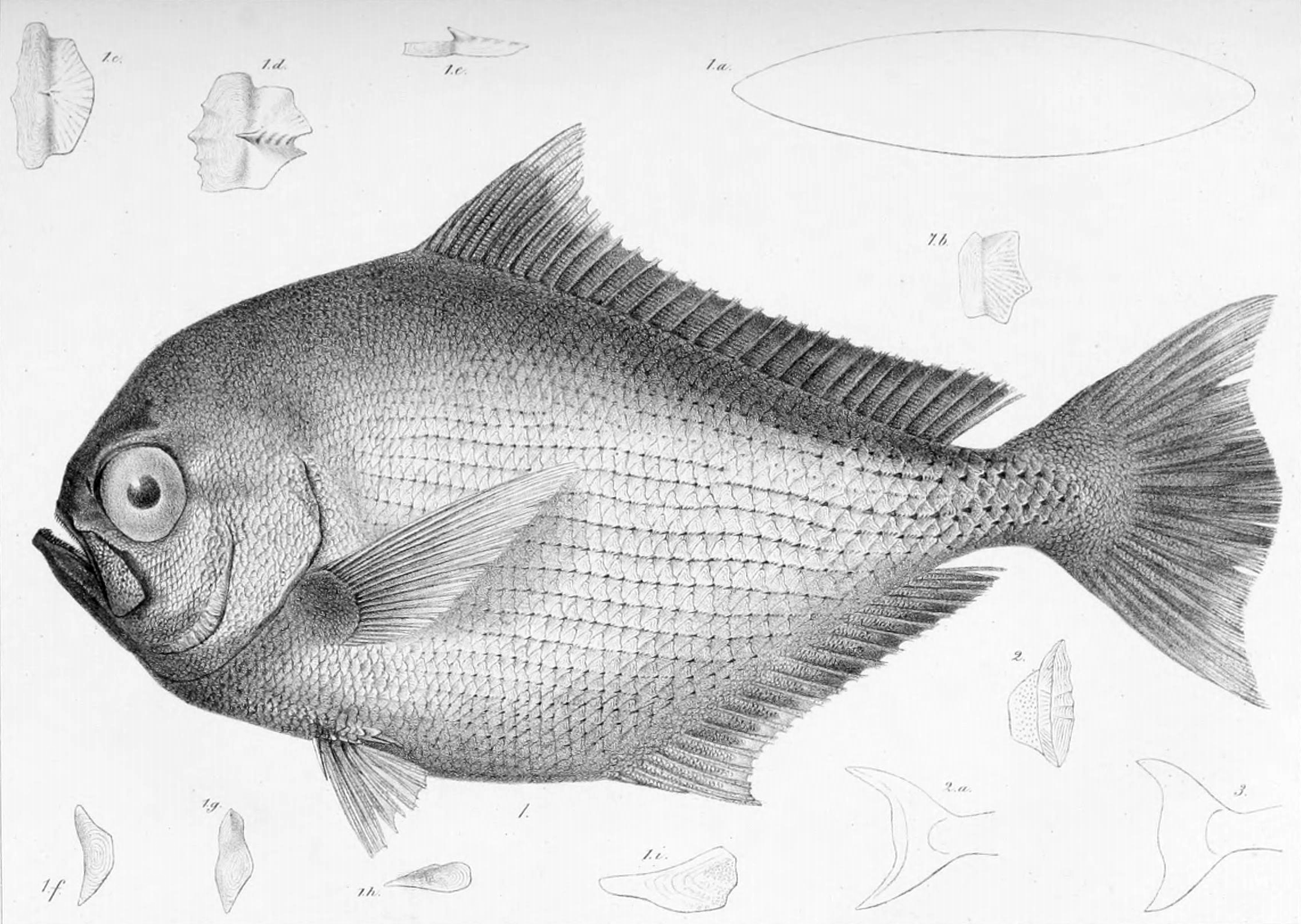
- Eumegistus brevorti

Scientific classification
- Domain: Eukaryota
- Kingdom: Animalia
- Phylum: Chordata
- Class: Actinopterygii
- Order: Scombriformes
- Family: Bramidae
- Genus: Eumegistus; D. S. Jordan & E. K. Jordan, 1922

Type species
- Eumegistus illustris D. S. Jordan & E. K. Jordan, 1922

= Eumegistus =

Genus of ray-finned fishes

Eumegistus is a small genus of pomfrets found in the Atlantic and Pacific oceans.

== Species ==
There are currently two recognized species in this genus:

- Eumegistus brevorti (Poey, 1860) (Tropical pomfret)
- Eumegistus illustris D. S. Jordan & E. K. Jordan, 1922 (Brilliant pomfret)
