= Bengt Fredrik Fries =

Swedish zoologist (1799–1839)

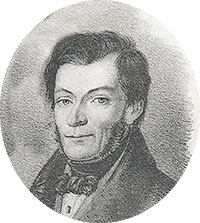
- Born: 24 August 1799; Helsingborg, Scania, Sweden
- Died: 7 April 1839 (aged 39); Stockholm, Sweden
- Education: Lund University
- Scientific career
- Fields: Zoology; entomology

Bengt Fredrik Fries (24 August 1799, in Helsingborg – 7 April 1839, in Stockholm) was a Swedish zoologist. He studied at Lund University.

== Works ==
- Observationes entomologicæ (1824)
- Beskrifning nya insekter från Colombien (1833).
- Skandinaviens fiskar: målade efter lefvande exemplar och ritade på sten. Stockholm: P. A. Norstedt & Soner (A history of Scandinavian fishes) 1836-57 with Carl Ulric Ekström sv:Carl Ulric Ekström and Carl Jakob Sundevall.
