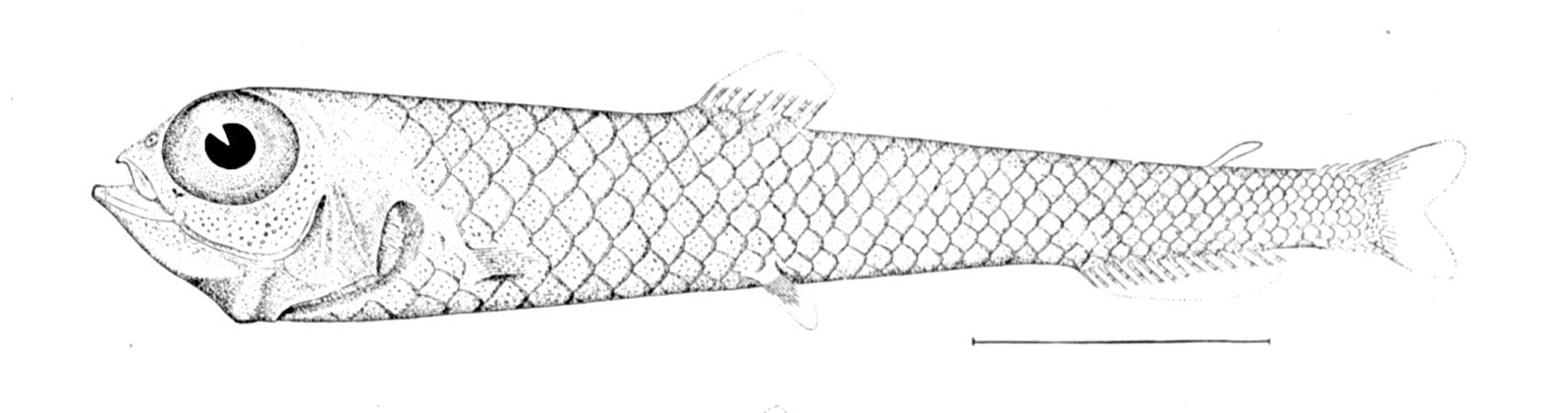
- Goiter blacksmelt, (Bathylagus euryops)

Scientific classification
- Kingdom: Animalia
- Phylum: Chordata
- Class: Actinopterygii
- Order: Argentiniformes
- Family: Bathylagidae
- Genus: Bathylagus; Günther, 1878

Species
- See text

Synonyms
- Therobromus Lucas, 1899

= Bathylagus =

Bathylagus Temporal range: Late Miocene–present

Genus of fishes

Bathylagus is a genus of deep-sea smelts, some species of which are noted for having stylophthalmine larvae.

== Species ==
The seven recognized, extant species in this genus are:

- Bathylagus andriashevi Kobyliansky, 1986
- Bathylagus antarcticus Günther, 1878 (Antarctic deepsea smelt)
- Bathylagus euryops Goode & T. H. Bean, 1896 (goiter blacksmelt)
- Bathylagus gracilis Lönnberg, 1905
- Bathylagus niger Kobyliansky, 2006
- Bathylagus pacificus C. H. Gilbert, 1890 (slender blacksmelt)
- Bathylagus tenuis Kobyliansky, 1986

The oldest fossil species in this genus known from skeletal remains are from the Miocene. These include Bathylagus angelensis, whose remains are widespread across Southern California (Monterey Formation and Modelo Formation), as well as B. sencta, B. obesa, and B. toyohamaensis from Japan. These specimens are all known from formations that were formerly deposited in deep-sea environments, before being dramatically uplifted to the surface by geological activity. However, tentative fossil otoliths are also known from the Late Cretaceous (Maastrichtian) of the United States.
