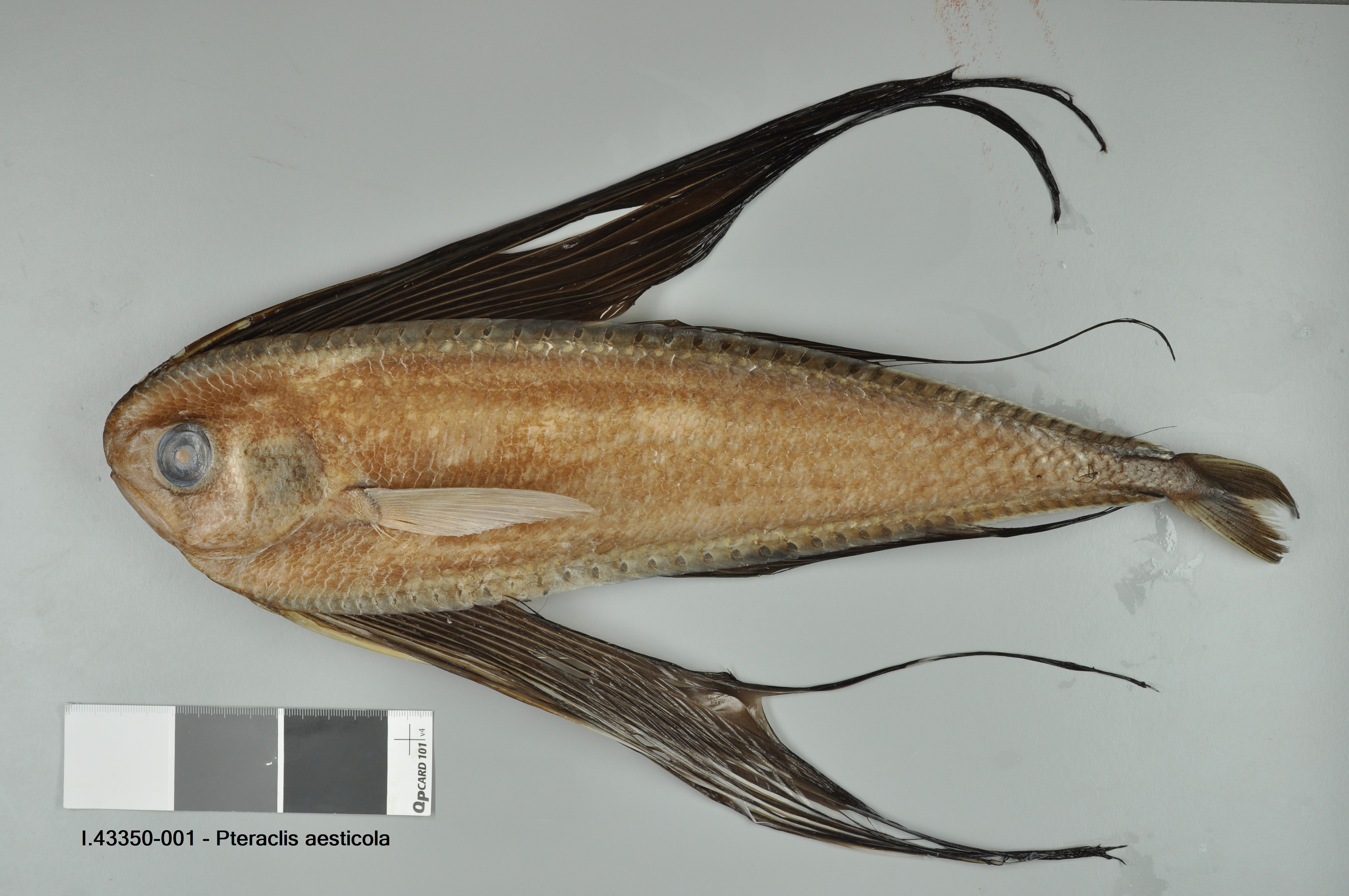
- Pteraclis aesticola

Scientific classification
- Domain: Eukaryota
- Kingdom: Animalia
- Phylum: Chordata
- Class: Actinopterygii
- Order: Scombriformes
- Family: Bramidae
- Genus: Pteraclis; Gronow, 1772

Type species
- Pteraclis pinnata Gronow, 1772

= Pteraclis =

Genus of ray-finned fishes

Pteraclis is a genus of ray-finned fish in the family Bramidae, the pomfrets. They are known commonly as fanfishes. The three species are distributed throughout the oceans of the world.

== Species ==
Species include:

- Pteraclis aesticola (D. S. Jordan & Snyder, 1901) – Pacific fanfish
- Pteraclis carolinus Valenciennes, 1833 – fanfish
- Pteraclis velifera (Pallas, 1770) – spotted fanfish
