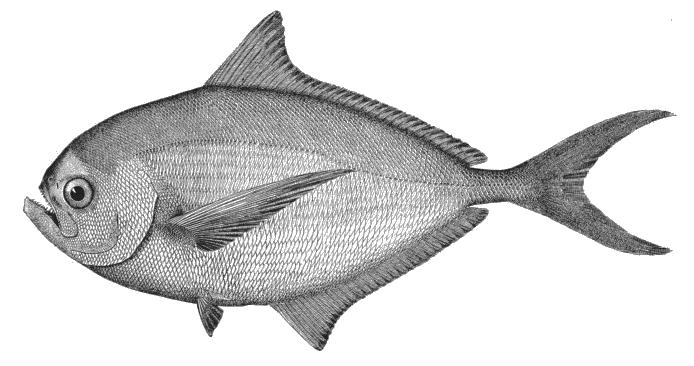
- Atlantic pomfret (B. brama)

Scientific classification
- Kingdom: Animalia
- Phylum: Chordata
- Class: Actinopterygii
- Division: Teleostei
- Order: Scombriformes
- Family: Bramidae
- Genus: Brama; Bloch & J. G. Schneider, 1801

Type species
- Sparus raii Bloch, 1791

Synonyms
- Amblytoxotes Bleeker, 1876; Collybus Snyder, 1801; Lepidotus Asso y del Rio, 1801; Lepodus Rafinesque, 1810; Tylometopon Bleeker, 1872

= Brama (fish) =

Genus of fishes

Brama is a genus of marine ray-finned fishes from the family Bramidae, the pomfrets. The genus currently comprises eight species (see below).

== Characteristics ==
Species of Brama have a compressed head and body, the body forming a tapering oval shape with a slender caudal peduncle.

The dorsal and ventral profiles of the head are smoothly convex, and the snout is short and bluntly rounded. The mouth is oblique and angled upward, with the lower jaw projecting

There is a single dorsal fin and a long-based anal fin; the dorsal fin originates above the base of the pectoral fins. The dorsal and anal fins are similar in shape, although the dorsal fin has a distinct anterior lobe. The pectoral fins are positioned low on the body and are relatively long, extending to about the midpoint of the anal fin. The pelvic fins are small and situated below the base of the pectoral fins. The caudal fin is deeply forked.

The body and most of the head are covered in keeled scales, while the scales that cover the ventral surface are smooth.

== Taxonomy ==
The genus Brama was established in 1801 by the German naturalists Marcus Elieser Bloch (1723–1799) and Johann Gottlob Schneider (1750–1822). In 1823, Jean-Baptiste Bory de Saint-Vincent designated Sparus raii Bloch, 1791 as the type species.

== Species ==
Eight recognized species are in this genus:

- Brama australis Valenciennes, 1838 (southern Ray's bream)
- Brama brama (Bonnaterre, 1788) (Atlantic pomfret)
- Brama caribbea Mead, 1972 (Caribbean pomfret)
- Brama dussumieri G. Cuvier, 1831 (lesser bream)
- Brama japonica Hilgendorf, 1878 (Pacific pomfret)
- Brama myersi Mead, 1972 (Myers' pomfret)
- Brama orcini G. Cuvier, 1831 (bigtooth pomfret)
- Brama pauciradiata Moteki, Fujita & Last, 1995 (shortfin pomfret)

== Distribution and range ==
Species of the genus Brama are predominantly pelagic and occur worldwide in high seas, with the exception of Arctic and Subarctic regions. Two species, Brama orcini and Brama dussumieri, differ in occurring in shallower waters near landmasses.

== Commercial importance ==
Some Brama species are common and, when large, are targeted by fisheries, particularly those off Spain and Portugal.

== Ecology ==
Although known to be migratory, their migratory behaviour remains poorly documented. Spawning is thought to occur in near-surface waters, as early life stages are most frequently collected in the upper water column. Bramids, including Brama species, are commonly recorded in the stomach contents of large pelagic predators such as tuna and billfish, indicating their importance as forage fish.
