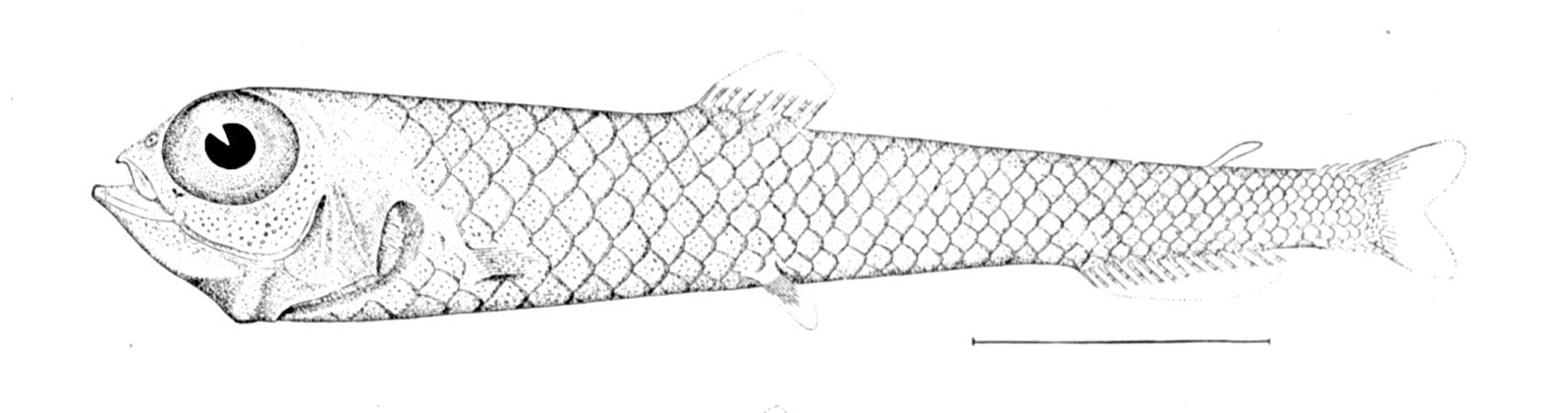
- Goiter blacksmelt, Bathylagus euryops

Scientific classification
- Kingdom: Animalia
- Phylum: Chordata
- Class: Actinopterygii
- Order: Argentiniformes
- Family: Bathylagidae; T. N. Gill, 1884

Genera
- Bathylagichthys; Bathylagoides; Bathylagus; Dolicholagus; Leuroglossus; Lipolagus; Melanolagus; Pseudobathylagus

= Deep-sea smelt =

Deep-sea smelts Temporal range: Maastrichtian–present

Family of fishes

The deep-sea smelts are any members of the family Bathylagidae, a distinct group of marine smelts.

Deep-sea smelts are marine fishes found in deep waters throughout the oceans, down to 1,500 m (4,900 ft) in depth. They are small fishes, growing up to 25 cm (9.8 in) long. They feed on plankton, especially krill.

Extinct genera known only from fossil remains include Quaesita from California, USA and Krumvirichthys from the Czech Republic. The oldest fossils are otoliths from the Maastrichtian.
