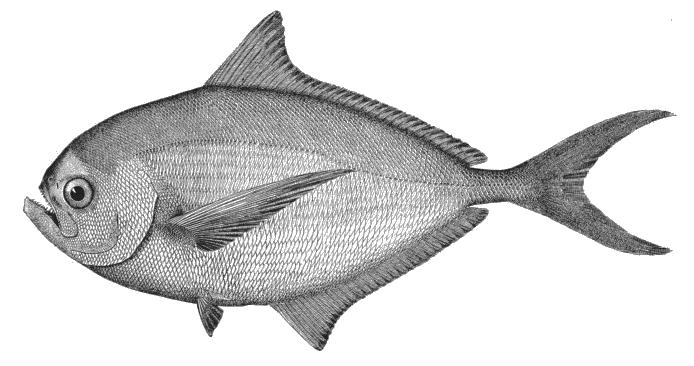
- Atlantic pomfret, Brama brama

Scientific classification
- Kingdom: Animalia
- Phylum: Chordata
- Class: Actinopterygii
- Division: Teleostei
- Order: Scombriformes
- Suborder: Scombroidei
- Family: Bramidae; Bonaparte, 1831

Genera
- See text

= Pomfret =

Pomfret Temporal range: Early Oligocene–recent

Family of ray-finned fishes

Pomfrets are scombriform fish belonging to the family Bramidae. The family currently includes 20 species across seven genera. Several species are important food sources for humans, especially Brama brama in the Indian Sub-continent. The earlier form of the pomfret's name was "pamflet", a word which probably ultimately comes from Portuguese pampo, referring to various fish such as the blue butterfish (Stromateus fiatola). The fish meat is white in color.

== Distribution ==
They are found globally in the Atlantic, Indian, and Pacific Oceans, as well as numerous seas including the Norwegian, Mediterranean, and Sea of Japan. Nearly all species can be found in the high seas. However, fish in the genera Pterycombus and Pteraclis tend to be found off continental shelves. Further, fishes in the genus Eumegistus are hypothesized to be largely benthic and found to occupy deep water shelves.

Some species of pomfrets are also known as monchong, specifically in Hawaiian cuisine.

== Genera ==
The following genera are placed within the family Bramidae:

- Brama Bloch & Schneider, 1801
- Eumegistus Jordan & Jordan, 1922
- Pteraclis Gronow, 1772
- Pterycombus Fries, 1837
- Taractes Lowe, 1843
- Taractichthys Mead & Maul, 1958
- Xenobrama Yatsu & Nakamura, 1989

The following fossil genera are also known:

- ?†Bramoides Casier, 1966
- ?†Goniocranion Casier, 1966 (possibly a lampriform)
- †Paucaichthys Baciu & Bannikov, 2003

The fossil genus †Digoria was also previously placed with the Bramidae, but is now known to be a polymixiiform within its own family, Digoriidae.

== See also ==
- Several species of butterfishes in the genus Pampus are also known as "pomfrets".
- List of fish families
